= List of comedy podcasts =

This is a list of notable comedy and humor podcasts. The items, which are not comprehensive, are listed in alphabetical order.

== List ==
Podcast	Year	Starring, Narrator(s), or Host(s)	Produced by	Ref
372 Pages We'll Never Get Back	2017–present	Michael J. Nelson and Conor Lastowka	Independent	
The Adam Buxton Podcast	2015–present	Adam Buxton	Independent	
The Adam Carolla Show	2005–present	Adam Carolla, Bryan Bishop, and Gina Grad	PodcastOne	
Adulting	2019	Michelle Buteau and Jordan Carlos	WNYC Studios	
And That's Why We Drink	2017–present	Christine Schiefer and Em Schulz	Kast Media	
Another Round	2015–2017	Tracy Clayton and Heben Nigatu	Panoply Media and BuzzFeed	
Answer Me This!	2007–2021; 2023	Helen Zaltzman and Olly Mann	Independent	
The Anthony Cumia Show		Anthony Cumia		
Armchair Expert	2018–present	Dax Shepard and Monica Padman	Wondery	
Attitudes!				
The Baby-Sitters Club Club				
The Bald and the Beautiful				
Beach too Sandy, Water too Wet	2018	siblings Alex and Christine Schiefer		
Beef And Dairy Network Podcast				
The Best Show with Tom Scharpling	2000–2013, 2014–present	Tom Scharpling, Jon Wurster		
Black Men Can't Jump (In Hollywood)				
Blank Check with Griffin & David				
The Brilliant Idiots				
Bubble				
The Bugle				
Bullseye with Jesse Thorn				
Call Her Daddy	2018–present	Alex Cooper	Unwell Network	
Can I Pet Your Dog?				
The Carlötta Beautox Chronicles				
The Champs				
Chapo Trap House	2016–present	Will Menaker, Matt Christman, Felix Biederman, and Amber A'Lee Frost	Chris Wade	
The Collings and Herrin Podcast	2008–2012	Andrew Collins (broadcaster) and Richard Herring		
Come to Papa				
The Comedian's Comedian with Stuart Goldsmith				
Comedy Bang! Bang!	2009–present	Scott Aukerman	Earwolf	
Comments by Celebs				
The Complete Guide to Everything				
Conan O'Brien Needs a Friend	2018–present	Conan O'Brien, Matt Gourley, and Sona Movsesian	Team Coco and Earwolf	
Crime Writers On				
Cum Town	2016–2022	Nick Mullen, Stavros Halkias, and Adam Friedland	Nick Mullen	
David Feldman Show		David Feldman		
The Dead Authors Podcast				
Dear Hank & John				
Desus vs. Mero				
Do the Right Thing				
The Dollop	2014–present	Dave Anthony and Gareth Reynolds	All Things Comedy	
Doogtoons				
Dopey				
Doug Stanhope's Podcast				
Doughboys	2015–present	Mike Mitchell and Nick Wiger	Headgum	
The Drew and Mike Podcast				
Drunken Peasants				
Dudesy	2022–2024	Will Sasso and Chad Kultgen		
The Duncan Trussell Family Hour	2012–present	Duncan Trussell		
Ear Biscuits	2013–present	Rhett and Link	Audacy, Inc.	
Emergency Intercom	2021–present	Enya Umanzor and Drew Phillips	Tiny Meat Gang (until 2024)	
Endless Thread				
The Flop House				
Gay Pimpin' with Jonny McGovern				
Get Played				
Getting Doug with High				
Gilmore Guys				
Girl on Guy				
The Glass Cannon				
Good for You				
Good Muslim, Bad Muslim				
The Greatest Generation				
The Guilty Feminist				
Guys We Fucked				
Hamish & Andy	2018–present	Hamish Blake and Andy Lee	LiSTNR	
Harmontown	2012–2019	Dan Harmon and Jeff B. Davis		
Hello from the Magic Tavern				
Hello Internet				
The Hilarious World of Depression				
Hollywood Babble-On	2010–present	Kevin Smith and Ralph Garman	SModcast Podcast Network	
Hollywood Handbook				
How Did This Get Made?				
How Was Your Week with Julie Klausner	2011–present	Julie Klausner	Independent	
I Seem Fun: The Diary of Jen Kirkman				
I Think You're Overthinking It (formerly The Nerdist Podcast, and ID10T with Chris Hardwick)	2010–present	Chris Hardwick, (Jonah Ray, & Matt Mira until 2018)	Cadence13 (formerly Nerdist)	
If I Were You				
Improv4humans		Matt Besser		
International Waters				
Jay & Silent Bob Get Old	2010–2020	Kevin Smith and Jason Mewes	SModcast Podcast Network	
The Joe Rogan Experience	2009–present	Joe Rogan	Jamie Vernon and Joe Rogan (occasionally)	
Jordan, Jesse, Go!	2007–present	Jordan Morris and Jesse Thorn	Maximum Fun	
Judge John Hodgman	2010–present	John Hodgman and Jesse Thorn	Maximum Fun	
Keith and The Girl				
Kill Tony	2013–present	Tony Hinchcliffe	Brian Redban	
Knowledge Fight				
Las Culturistas				
The Last Podcast on the Left				
Le donjon de Naheulbeuk				
Leyendas Legendarias				
Loveline				
Lovett or Leave It				
Low Blows				
Maintenance Phase				
Mega64	2006–present	Rocco Botte, Derrick Acosta, and Shawn Chatfield		
The Memory Palace				
Midwest Teen Sex Show				
The Misfits Podcast	2018–2022	Cameron 'Fitz' McKay, Mason 'Zuckles' Bradford, McCreamy, Swaggersouls, Tobi 'TobiOnTheTele' Lyons		
Mission to Zyxx				
Monday Morning Podcast	2007–2012	Bill Burr		
My Brother, My Brother and Me	2010–present	Justin, Travis, and Griffin McElroy	Maximum Fun	
My Dad Wrote a Porno	2015–2022	Jamie Morton, James Cooper, and Alice Levine		
My Favorite Murder	2016–present	Karen Kilgariff and Georgia Hardstark	Exactly Right	
Nerd Poker	2012–2015, 2017–present	Brian Posehn, Blaine Capatch, Chris Tallman, Dan Telfer, Ken Daly, Sam Kieffer (formerly Gerry Duggan, Steve Agee, Sarah Guzzardo, Scott "Mr. Sark" Robison)	Independent (formerly Earwolf)	
Never Not Funny				
The News Quiz				
Newsjack				
No Agenda				
Norm Macdonald Live	2013–2017	Norm Macdonald and Adam Eget	Daniel Kellison	
The Now Show				
Off Menu with Ed Gamble and James Acaster				
Office Ladies	2019–present	Jenna Fischer and Angela Kinsey	Earwolf	
OMGWTFBible				
On Cinema				
The ParaPod				
Pardon My Take	2016–present	Dan "Big Cat" Katz and PFT Commenter	Barstool Sports	
The Peacock and Gamble Podcast				
Perfect Guy Life	2021–present	Sam Hyde and Nick Rochefort	Independent	
Pod Meets World				
Podcast But Outside				
Politically Re-Active				
Pop My Culture				
Potterless				
Probably Science				
Professor Blastoff				
The Read				
Red Man Laughing				
Red Scare	2018–present	Dasha Nekrasova and Anna Khachiyan		
Richard Herring's interview podcasts	2011–present			
The Ricky Gervais Show	2005–2011	Ricky Gervais, Stephen Merchant, and Karl Pilkington		
RISK!				
Ronna and Beverly				
Rooster Teeth Podcast	2008–2024	Burnie Burns, Geoff Ramsey, Joel Heyman, Gus Sorola		
RuPaul: What's the Tee?	2014–present	RuPaul and Michelle Visage		
Sawbones				
Screen Junkies				
Shagged Married Annoyed				
Shameless				
The Six Pack				
SmartLess	2020–present	Jason Bateman, Sean Hayes, and Will Arnett	Amazon Music	
SModcast	2010–present	Kevin Smith and Scott Mosier	SModcast Podcast Network	
The Socially Distant Sports Bar				
Spittin' Chiclets				
Spontaneanation				
Star Wars Minute				
StarTalk				
The Starters				
Stephen Fry's Podgrams				
Stop Podcasting Yourself				
Straight Talk with Ross Mathews				
Street Fight Radio				
Superego				
Surprisingly Awesome				
Talk Tuah				
Tell 'Em Steve-Dave!				
Ten Minute Podcast	2012–2018	Will Sasso, Chris D'Elia, and Bryan Callen		
This Sounds Serious				
Three Bean Salad	2021–present	Benjamin Partridge, Mike Wozniak, and Henry Paker	Independent	
TOFOP				
Tom Rhodes Radio				
Too Beautiful to Live				
Uhh Yeah Dude				
UNHhhh, the Podcast				
Unqualified				
A Very Fatal Murder				
Wait Wait... Don't Tell Me!				
Walking the Room				
The Weekly Show with Jon Stewart	2024–present	Jon Stewart	Comedy Central	
Welcome to Night Vale	2012–present	Cecil Baldwin	Night Vale Presents	
Were You Raised By Wolves?				
Who? Weekly				
Why I'm Not... with Brant Pinvidic				
Why Won't You Date Me?				
Wikishuffle				
With Special Guest Lauren Lapkus				
Womp It Up!				
Wooden Overcoats				
The Worst Idea of All Time				
WTF with Marc Maron	2009–2025	Marc Maron	Brendan McDonald	
Yeah, But Still				
Yo, Is This Racist?				
You Look Nice Today	2008–2015	Merlin Mann, Scott Simpson, and Adam Lisagor	Independent	
You Made It Weird with Pete Holmes				
Your Mom's House				
