= List of religion and spirituality podcasts =

The following is a list of religion and spirituality podcasts.

== Lists ==
| Podcast | Year | Religion | Starring, Narrator(s), or Host(s) | Produced by | Ref |
|---|---|---|---|---|---|
| The Now Age | 2018–2019 | Spirituality | Ruby Warrington | The Numinous Network | |
| The Spiritual Forum | 2018–present | Spirituality | Carol Saunders | Independent | |
| Rebel Guru Radio | 2016–present | Spirituality | Eric Pepin | Higher Balance Institute | |
| The TruthSeekah Podcast | 2018–present | Spirituality | TruthSeekah | Independent | |
| Raw Spirituality Podcast | 2017–present | Spirituality | Alyssa Malehorn and Zack Fuentes | Independent | |
| Langston's World | 2020 | Spirituality | Langston White | Independent | |
| Mindful Living Spiritual Awakening | 2015–present | Spirituality | Marijo Puleo | Independent | |
| Angel Walk-In & Team of Angels | 2019–present | Spirituality | | Angel Messenger | |
| The Universe Made Me Do It | 2019–2020 | Spirituality | Kerry Kott | Independent | |
| The Numinous Podcast | 2015–present | Spirituality | Carmen Spagnola | The Numinous Network | |
| Pass the Mic | 2019–present | Spirituality | Tyler Burns and Jemar Tisby | The Witness: A Black Christian Collective | |
| Everyone's Agnostic | 2014–2019 | Spirituality | Cass Midgley and Marie D'Elephant | Independent | |
| (w)Holy Media | | Spirituality | Ashley Campbell | Independent | |
| The One You Feed | 2016–present | Spirituality | Eric Zimmer | Wondery | |
| Self Service | 2018 | Spirituality | Jerico Mandybur | Girlboss Radio | |
| Harry Potter and the Sacred Text | 2016–present | Spirituality | Casper ter Kuile and Vanessa Zoltan | Not Sorry Productions | |
| Spark My Muse | 2018–present | Spirituality | Lisa Colón DeLay | Independent | |
| Interfaith Voices | 2019–present | Religion and Spirituality | Amber Khan | Independent | |
| Super Soul | 2017–present | Spirituality | Oprah Winfrey | OWN Podcasts | |
| On Being | 2010–present | Spirituality | Krista Tippett | On Being Studios | |
| Oh No, Ross and Carrie! | 2011–present | Spirituality | Ross Blocher and Carrie Poppy | Maximum Fun | |
| The Nuanced Life | 2017–2020 | Spirituality | Sarah Stewart Holland and Beth Silvers | | |
| Against The Stream | 2020–2021 | Buddhist | Noah Levine | Against The Stream Meditation Center | |
| Fight Hustle, End Hurry | | Christianity | | | |
| Coffee With Jesus | 2020-present | Christianity | Todd Uebele, Sara van Driel, Elizabeth Bristol | Coffee With Jesus Ministries | |
| WHOA That's Good | | Christianity | | | |
| Ask NT Wright Anything | | Christianity | | | |
| The Bible Recap | | Christianity | | | |
| Renewing Your Mind | | Christianity | R.C. Sproul | | |
| That Sounds Fun | | Christianity | Annie F. Downs | | |
| The Bible Project | | Christianity | | | |
| Daily Grace | | Christianity | | | |
| Transformation Church | | Christianity | | | |
| The Happy Hour | | Christianity | Jamie Ivey | | |
| Elevation | | Christianity | Steven Furtick | | |
| Risen Motherhood | | Christianity | | | |
| Another Name for Every Thing | | Christianity | Richard Rohr | | |
| The Bible in a Year | 2021–present | Christianity | Mike Schmitz | Ascension (publisher) | |
| Good Christian Fun | 2017–present | Christianity | Kevin T. Porter and Caroline Ely | | |
| The Sci-Fi Christian | 2011–present | Christianity | Matt Anderson and Ben De Bono | | |
| The Robcast | | Christianity | Rob Bell | | |
| Prophecy Pros | | Christianity | Jeff Kinley and Todd Hampson | | |
| Daily Grace | | Christianity | | | |
| The Crazy Happy Podcast | | Christianity | Daniel Fusco and Billy Hallowell | Edifi Podcast Network | |
| Jesus is Real | | Christianity | Daniel Fusco | Edifi Podcast Network | |
| You're Gonna Make It with Daniel Fusco | | Christianity | Daniel Fusco | Edifi Podcast Network | |
| Renovaré Podcast | | Christianity | Nathan Foster | | |
| Finding Holy | | Christianity | Ashley Hales | | |
| Witness | | Christianity | | | |
| Back Porch Theology | | Christianity | Lisa Harper with Allison Allen & Jim Howard | AccessMore | |
| The Lord of Spirits | 2020-present | Eastern Orthodox Christianity | Fr Andrew Stephen Damick & Fr Stephen De Young | Ancient Faith Ministries | |
| Unorthodox | | Judaism | Mark Oppenheimer, Stephanie Butnick, and Liel Leibovitz | | |
| Judaism Unbound | | Judaism | Daniel Libenson and Lex Rofeberg | | |
| Intimate Judaism | | Judaism | Rabbi Scott Kahn and Talli Rosenbaum | | |
| Daddy Squared | | Judaism | Yanir Dekel and Alex Maghen | | |
| Israel Story | | Judaism | Mishy Harman | | |
| The Book of Life | | Judaism | | | |
| This Being Human | | Islam | Abdul-Rehman Malik | | |
| Good Muslim, Bad Muslim | | Islam | Tanzila Ahmed and Zahra Noorbakhsh | | |
| Tell Them, I Am | | Islam | Misha Euceph | | |
| The Digital Sisterhood | | Islam | | | |
| Crossing Faiths | | Islam/Christianity | John Pinna and Elliot Toman | Independent | |
| Mormon Stories Podcast | | Mormonism | | | |
| Preach | | Mormonism | | | |
| Communicator Academy | | | | | |
| Marinate on That | | | | | |
| HINGE | | | | | |
| This I Believe | | | | | |
| Trevor Talks: Crowder | | | | | |
| Once Upon A Crescent: Muslim Kid's Podcast | 2020-Present | Islam | Mrs. Hashimi | Independent | |
