= OMGWTFBible =

Jewish podcast

OMGWTFBIBLE
- Genre: Religion and spirituality podcast; Jewish podcast; Humor and comedy podcast
- Language: English

Cast and voices
- Hosted by: David Tuchman

Production
- Production: John Passaro
- Length: 20–40 Minutes

Publication
- No. of seasons: 5
- No. of episodes: 61
- Original release: October 20, 2012
- Provider: Jewcy
- Updates: Monthly

Related
- Related shows: Unorthodox; Judaism Unbound; Treyf; Kaddish
- Website: omgwtfbible.com

OMGWTFBIBLE is a Jewish podcast hosted by comedian David Tuchman and produced by Jewcy. The show translates the Hebrew Bible into a serialized comedy show.

== Background ==
The show is a Jewish podcast hosted by comedian David Tuchman. The goal of the show is to retranslate the Bible while providing commentary on the ridiculous aspects of the various stories. Each month a new episode is recorded live with a different guest each time. The inspiration for the show came from some advice that Tuchman received from his writing professor who said "If you want inspiration, all you have to do is read the Bible cover to cover." The show was produced by Jewcy, the online Jewish magazine, beginning with episode nineteen. Episodes were available on Jewcy the day before they were released elsewhere.

The first year of the show was solely dedicated to discussing the book of Genesis. Episode number twelve featured Elissa Goldstein as the guest of the show, which was recorded live at the East Village bar in New York City. The show recorded episode twenty-nine with Mark Leuchter at the Raven Lounge in Philadelphia where they discussed the Terumah.

Other notable guests include writers Abby Stein, Zoraida Córdova, Michael Malice and Matthue Roth, voice actress Sandy Fox, historian Michael W. Twitty, and comedian Catie Lazarus.

David Tuchman was interviewed on episode thirty-eight of Tablet Magazine's podcast, Unorthodox. The episode discussed Chametz and the Crossing the Red Sea.

In 2021, the podcast concluded after 61 episodes. In a 2023 blog post Tuchman announced that "OMGWTFBIBLE will return."

== Format ==
The show begins with a discussion of the interpreted text followed by an analysis of the reading. The intended audience of the show is modern and secular people rather than religious people.
