= Bullseye with Jesse Thorn =

American radio program and podcast

- Genre: Interview
- Running time: 30–60 min.
- Country of origin: United States
- Language: English
- Home station: Maximum Fun
- Syndicates: National Public Radio, Public Radio International (formerly)
- Hosted by: Jesse Thorn
- Recording studio: Los Angeles, California
- Original release: 2000 – present
- Website: maximumfun.org

Bullseye with Jesse Thorn (formerly The Sound of Young America) is a public radio program and podcast based in Los Angeles, California, and distributed by National Public Radio (NPR). The weekly show is currently heard on over 150 public radio stations. The program features host Jesse Thorn interviewing personalities in arts and culture, with a special focus on comedy.

== History ==
The Sound of Young America began in 2000 on the college radio station KZSC-FM, based at the University of California, Santa Cruz. At first, The Sound of Young America was a variety college radio show featuring Thorn and two other cohosts, Matt Dobbs (who soon dropped out in favor of Jordan Morris) and Gene O'Neill. Initially a morning show, it later ran from 5 to 6 p.m. each Thursday. O'Neill left in 2003, and Brian Lane filled in periodically thereafter. Upon Morris' departure in May 2004, the show began to use rotating co-hosts. That autumn, Thorn went solo.

Past contributors to the show include Jordan Morris, "Boy Detective", and "Big Time" Gene O'Neill as co-hosts, and regular appearances from Thorn's joke-telling and sometime rock-and-roller younger brother, the Master of "would you rather?" Jim Real, Brian "Back in Business" Lane, and artist/musician Dan Grayson. In 2003, the show staged a radio drama of Sad Dad, an original play written by Morris and O'Neill. 2003 also saw the debut of the show's theme song, Maximum Fun, written and performed by Thorn and Grayson.

Near the end of 2004 the show became available as a podcast. Thorn and the show were mentioned in The Wall Street Journal, Time, and Salon.com. Salon.com's Audiofile wrote, "If you've never heard of The Sound of Young America, The Sound of Young America is the greatest radio show you've never heard of", and described Thorn's interviewing style as combining "the civility and preparedness of [Terry] Gross leavened with the good humor of [Conan] O'Brien." In January 2006, Time selected the show in a column entitled "Pick of the Podcasts". The Wall Street Journal's "Blog Watch" column described the show as "a popular podcast where Mr. Thorn interviews some of the nation's top talent and comics occasionally perform sketches, and noted that Thorn produced the podcast "from his living room".

During this time, Thorn received a call from the director of programming at Public Radio International, who had heard one of the podcasts and expressed interest in distributing the show. In 2006 WNYC-FM, a public radio station in New York City, picked up the show, and PRI decided to distribute it. As of September 2008 the show was carried on 18 public radio stations, in addition to the podcast.

In January 2012, the show was renamed Bullseye, and began featuring The Go! Team's "Huddle Formation" as its theme song. As of April 2013, the show is distributed by National Public Radio.

== Market availability ==
In addition to the availability of the show as a podcast, the program is heard on 59 public terrestrial radio stations in 17 states.

== Other projects ==
In April 2006, The Sound of Young America launched a second podcast, The College Years, chronicling the pre-podcasting history of the show.

In December 2006, Thorn and Morris reteamed to launch the podcast-only program Jordan, Jesse, Go! (The first two episodes were released as "The Untitled Thorn/Morris Project".) The show is a return to the free-form radio that they did in Santa Cruz, before The Sound of Young America became almost exclusively an interview show. The first episode featured the return of former staple "Hang It Up/Keep It Up". The second episode saw the return of "Would You Rather?" and the introduction of "Judge John Hodgman" a mock-trial presided over by author/raconteur John Hodgman. Later shows often feature guests such as author Sarah Vowell, actor Rob Corddry, and various contemporary comedians.
