= ONRAC =

ONRAC or Onrac may refer to:

- ONRAC (plant), the EPPO code of Onopordium acanthium
- ONRAC (podcast), the abbreviation of Oh No, Ross and Carrie!
- Onrac, fictional city in 8-Bit Theater
