= The Grid (American TV series) =

- Genre: Comedy; Technology; News
- Presented by: Jesse Thorn
- Starring: Jesse Thorn; Marisa Pinson; Jordan Morris; Kulap Vilaysack; Vince Mancini
- Country of origin: United States

Production
- Running time: 15 minutes

Original release
- Network: IFC
- Release: September 9, 2010 – present

Related
- InfoMania

The Grid, hosted by podcasting and public radio host Jesse Thorn, is an American fifteen-minute weekly rundown of what is trending in indie culture. Each week on IFC, The Grid recommends movies, music, games, and gadgets of interest. Joining Jesse are an array of up-and-coming comedians, offering their own opinions on what is trending now. The Grid aired every Thursday at 7:45 p.m. EST, 4:45 PST on IFC. Various segments from the week's episode can be viewed online at IFC.com and on social networking websites.

== Production ==
The Grid premiered on IFC on September 9, 2010 The program's executive producer is Michael B. Pressman, and the producer is Michelle Von Wald. Each episode is written by Joshua Weiner.

Although Jesse Thorn is the only correspondent to appear on every episode, he did not become the host until episode 104. The first two episodes were hosted by Alex Berg, and the third was hosted by correspondent Sarah Lane. Other correspondents included Alonso Duralde, Whitney Pastorek, Kat Lyn, Ryan Downey, Taylor Orci and Shira Lazar. The director of these episodes was Lew Abramson.

Beginning with episode 111, Michael B. Pressman took over as the show's director and the show's regular correspondents became those listed below.

== Correspondents ==
- Jesse Thorn runs Maximum Fun, home of the nationally syndicated The Sound Of Young America radio show and podcast. As part of his show, Jesse interviews a new comedian, musician, or filmmaker each week. His previous guests have included Amy Sedaris, Judd Apatow and Fred Armisen. Jesse also co-hosts the podcast Jordan, Jesse, Go! With long-time sidekick and fellow Grid contributor Jordan Morris. In addition to his radio shows, Jesse hosts the video podcast Put This On, a guide to dressing like a grownup in the world of men's fashion.
- Marisa Pinson, is co-author of Dealbreaker: The Definitive List of Dating Offenses, and is an active member of the Upright Citizens Brigade Theatre in Los Angeles.
- Jordan Morris, is The Grid's resident man on the street attending everything from Food Truck Battles to Anime Burlesque Shows.
- Kulap Vilaysack has appeared on NBC’s The Office, and covers comic books, kitschy DVD releases and exciting new gadgets.
- Vince Mancini, editor in chief of popular movie blog FilmDrunk.com, covers DVD and film releases.

== Crew ==
- Executive Producer: Michael B. Pressman
- Producer: Michelle Von Wald
- Supervising Producer: Curtis Gwinn
- Staff Writers: Joshua Weiner, Alex Berg
- Director: Lew Abramson
- Editors: Carlos Pena, Joey Rabier, Brady Hammes, Matt Silfen, Jason Haberman, Cameron Gibson.
- Sound: Aaron D. Murphy, Ilana Urbach, Thomas Curley
- Production Manager: Rachel Garza
- Director of Photography: Jared Varava, Andrew Bridgewater, Dave Chung
- Make-Up: Michal Braun, Natalia Senina
- Stylist: Lauren Shapiro, Amber Sellers
- Production Assistants: Zachary Bradshaw, Cameron Gibson
- Executive Producer for IFC: Douglas Marshall
- Director, Production for IFC: Sara Morrow
- Production Supervisor for IFC: Keisha Punter
- Operations Manager for IFC: Ted Leuci
- Executive Producers: Debbie DeMontreux, Jennifer Caserta, Christine Lubrano
