= Good Christian Fun =

Podcast about Christian pop culture

- Genre: Christian pop culture
- Format: Interview podcast
- Language: English

Cast and voices
- Hosted by: Kevin T. Porter and Caroline Ely

Production
- Length: Approx. 60 minutes

Publication
- No. of episodes: 296
- Original release: August 30, 2017
- Provider: Headgum
- Updates: Weekly

Related
- Related shows: Gilmore Guys
- Website: www.goodchristianfun.com

Good Christian Fun is a Headgum podcast about Christian pop culture hosted by Kevin T. Porter and Caroline Ely. The show debuted in 2017 after Porter's previous podcast, Gilmore Guys, had ended. Good Christian Fun examines Christian media and pop culture from a progressive Christian perspective but is not intended solely for a Christian audience.

The hosts grew up in Christian homes and most of the media they discuss throughout the show is from the 1990s and early 2000s. For instance, the show has featured episodes on DC Talk, VeggieTales, and the Left Behind books.

== Background ==
Kevin T. Porter began podcasting as a co-host of the comedy podcast Gilmore Guys, which involved Porter and his co-host Demi Adejuyigbe watching through Gilmore Girls together. When Gilmore Guys ended in 2017, Porter started Good Christian Fun with co-host Caroline Ely on the Headgum network. Good Christian Fun is a narrowcast about Christian pop culture with a particular focus on Christian music and Christian movies.

The hosts of the podcast were both raised in Christian families and experienced pop culture which they discuss throughout the show. Each episode focuses on a specific piece of Christian media—often from the 1990s and early 2000s—such as a band, movie, or book. Every week Porter and Ely are joined by a different guest who provides their testimony or personal experiences with religion before discussing the chosen topic of the week.

The show is intended for anyone interested in the American subculture created by Christians, and has both religious and non-religious listeners. The aim of the show is not to proselytise or convert listeners to Christianity, but to dissect, critique, and enjoy Christian pop culture. Although the hosts still consider themselves to be Christians, they are not immersed in Christian pop culture like they were growing up. Despite the nostalgia the hosts have for the topics they discuss, the hosts critique the artistic and moral themes present in each subject—often through a progressive Christian perspective. Ely, in particular, is interested in examining how sexism is embedded in Christian media as well as how women are treated in Christian culture more broadly. However, their criticisms are not harsh or overly critical and the tone of the show is typically lighthearted and comedic. For instance, the podcast includes a recurring segment dedicated to finding the worst Christian song of all time.

Some of the more prominent Christian pop culture subjects featured on the show include DC Talk, VeggieTales, and the Left Behind books. Guests are chosen to discuss different aspects of Christian culture and how it has impacted culture more broadly. For instance, they interviewed Amy Grant about her experiences as a musician in both the Christian and secular music industry. The show discusses Christian media that has had a lasting legacy and impact on Christian culture such as the 1988 hit song "Awesome God" by Rich Mullins, which held the number one spot on Christian radio shortly after its release. Although the show typically focuses on media created by and for Christians, there are occasions when the hosts select a secular work that heavily integrates or examines Christianity. For example, there is an episode dedicated to discussing the CBS series called God Friended Me and another episode that discusses Spotlight, a documentary covering the sexual abuse scandal in the Roman Catholic Archdiocese of Boston.

== Reception ==
Many critics praised the show for striking a balance of lighthearted and nostalgic conversations with thoughtful analysis and criticism. For instance, Emily St. James commented in Vox that the hosts' nostalgia combined with their criticism creates a "great tension" that results in profound and humorous conversations. According to Caroline Siede of The A.V. Club, the critical approach of the hosts balances out their nostalgia for the pop culture they grew up with. Becca James wrote in Vulture that former Christians might be cynical about the show at first, but the hosts do a great job of easing the listener into the conversation. Similarly, Andrea Sadowski wrote in The Cascade that the podcast is a "soothing balm to my religious trauma." The welcoming nature of the podcast was also praised by Rebecca Bulnes in The A.V. Club, who said the hosts' "enthusiasm and affection for the material ... welcomes anyone along for the ride." Nick Douglas included an episode of the show in LifeHacker's list of best podcast episodes of 2018 and compared the show to Heeb due to its irreverent and silly tone. The podcast was nominated for best religion and spirituality podcast in the 2022 People's Choice Podcast Awards.

== See also ==
- List of religion and spirituality podcasts
- List of pop culture podcasts
