= Preach =

Preach may refer to:

- "Preach" (M.O song), 2015
- "Preach" (Drake song), 2015
- "Preach" (John Legend song), 2019
- "Preach", a 2014 song by Young Dolph
- "Preach", a 2023 song by 6lack from Since I Have a Lover
- Preach (podcast), a religion and spirituality podcast

== See also ==
- License to Preach (Methodist)
- Preacher (disambiguation)
- Preaching, a religious oration or lecture
- Preaching bands, a type of clerical neckwear
- Preaching cross, a Christian cross erected outdoors to designate a preaching place
