= On Being =

Spirituality podcast by Krista Tippett

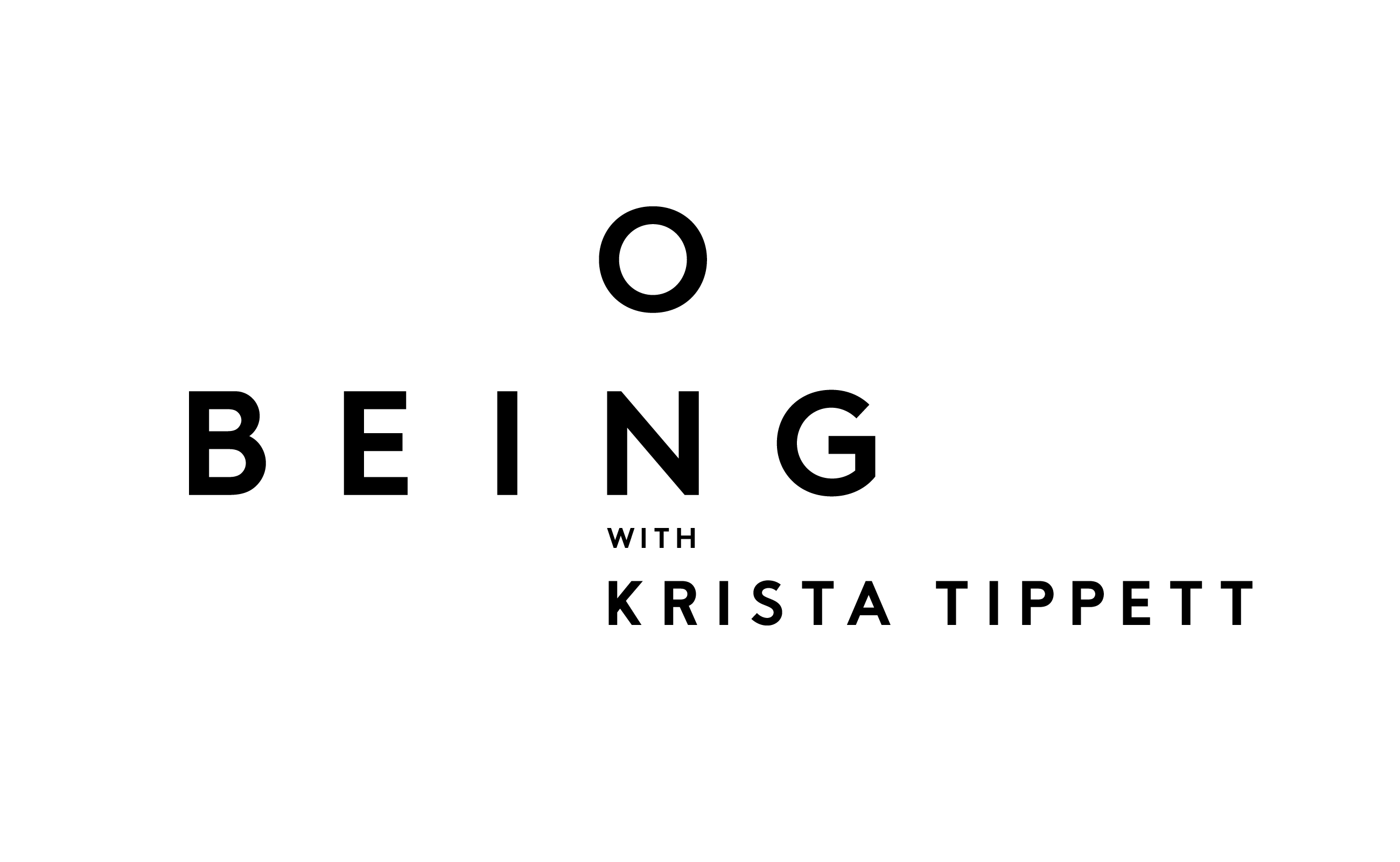
- Other names: First Person (2001–2003); Speaking of Faith (2003–2010)
- Genre: Interview; Religion and spirituality podcast
- Running time: 51 minutes
- Country of origin: United States
- Language: English
- Syndicates: Public Radio Exchange
- Hosted by: Krista Tippett
- Created by: Krista Tippett
- Executive producer: Krista Tippett
- Recording studio: Minneapolis, Minnesota
- Original release: September 22, 2001 – present
- No. of episodes: 283
- Other themes: "Seven League Boots" by Zoe Keating
- Website: onbeing.org

On Being is a podcast and a former public radio program. Hosted by Krista Tippett, it examines what it calls the "animating questions at the center of human life: What does it mean to be human, and how do we want to live?"

== Radio program and podcast ==
=== Format ===
On Being is an hour-long radio show and podcast, hosted by Krista Tippett.

Tippett has interviewed guests ranging from poets to physicists, doctors to historians, artists to activists. Her guests include the 14th Dalai Lama, Maya Angelou, Mohammed Fairouz, Desmond Tutu, Thich Nhat Hanh, Rosanne Cash, Wangari Maathai, Yo-Yo Ma, Paulo Coehlo, Brian Greene, John Polkinghorne, Jean Vanier, Joanna Macy, Sylvia Earle, and Elie Wiesel.

In 2006, On Being became the first national public radio show to offer unedited interviews alongside the produced radio show in their podcast and on their website.

=== History ===
Krista Tippett pitched a series of pilots on religion, meaning, and ethics to Bill Buzenberg, then Vice President for News at Minnesota Public Radio/American Public Media, in the late 1990s. The program became Speaking of Faith, a monthly series in 2001 and a weekly national program distributed by American Public Media (APM) in 2003. In 2010, the show's name changed to On Being. In 2013, Tippett left APM to start the non-profit production company, Krista Tippett Public Productions, which she described as "a social enterprise with a radio show at its heart".

As of July 2014, On Being aired on 334 public radio stations across the United States, and the On Being podcast reached a global audience of 1.5 million listeners a month. On Being was listed in the iTunes top ten podcasts of 2014. In 2016, On Being changed distributors from APM to the Public Radio Exchange.

In May 2022 it was announced that as of June 2022 the program would be changing from a weekly show to a "seasonal podcast," and the final weekly program aired in late June 2022.

=== Content ===
The Columbia Journalism Review said of On Being and Tippett, "To listen to her show is to hear how intelligent and thoughtful religious people can be when they are allowed to be subjective and not merely regurgitate dogma." In 2008 the show produced a series of programs called "Repossessing Virtue", exploring the spiritual and moral aspects of the economic recession. Other series have included "Revealing Ramadan" and "Living Islam" and "The Civil Conversations Project." In 2014, On Being produced two radio specials. "Science on Human Frontiers" included interviews with Brian Greene, Natalie Batalha, S. James Gates, Sylvia Earle, and Esther Sternberg. Most recently On Being produced a special series on "The American Consciousness," a collection of live interviews at the Chautauqua Institution with Michel Martin, Richard Rodriguez, Imani Perry, and Nathan Schneider. During part of the program's run, musician Lizzo rapped in the closing credits.

== Social enterprise ==
Krista Tippett Public Productions (KTPP) was founded in 2013 by Krista Tippett as a non-profit production company with a 4,000-square-foot studio and live event space on Loring Park in Minneapolis. KTPP managed the production and funding of the program, which is distributed by APM. In 2018, KTPP changed its name to The On Being Project.

=== Other Podcasts from The On Being Project ===
On Being is the flagship podcast for The On Being Project, but the organization has also produced other podcasts. These include Becoming Wise, which is closely associated with Krista Tippett's 2016 book by the same name; Creating Our Own Lives, which ran from 2016 to 2017; Poetry Unbound; This Movie Changed Me; and Living the Questions.

=== The Civil Conversations Project ===
In 2012, On Being began a series of interviews and live events which became the Civil Conversations Project. The initial four-part series was a collaboration of the Brookings Institution, the Humphrey School, and the John C. Danforth Center on Religion and Politics. The project grew out of a sentiment that Tippett heard from many Americans who felt that our "civic life is broken, that bipartisan consensus is inconceivable". Tippett says that "conduct in public spaces may be as important as the positions we take"; and "How do we walk in disagreement while keeping as much of our society intact as we can?"

The Civil Conversations Project has been described in southwestjournal.com as "an ever-evolving effort to help others host the kind of nuanced and empathetic discussions they hear on On Being", and a "lab for returning civility to civic life", with a website containing conversation starters, video of live events, and interviews. Tippett describes the program as about "equipping people, wherever they may live, to create new conversational spaces".

Harvard Law School has used resources from the Civil Conversations Project. In 2014, the Civil Conversations Project led an international pilot program in places such as Northern Ireland and Jordan.

== Awards ==
- President Barack Obama awarded Tippett the National Humanities Medal for:
  "thoughtfully delving into the mysteries of human existence. On the air and in print, Ms. Tippett avoids easy answers, embracing complexity and inviting people of every background to join her conversation about faith, ethics, and moral wisdom."
- George Foster Peabody Award for its radio and online production "The Ecstatic Faith of Rumi" in 2007, featuring interview with scholar Fatemeh Keshavarz.
- Webby Award: 2014, 2008, and 2005.
- Wilbur Award, Religion Communicators Council, for "Religion in a Time of War," and "Progressive Islam in America."
- Ambies Award: 2021.

== See also ==
- Religion and spirituality podcast
- List of religion and spirituality podcasts
- List of psychology and self-help podcasts
