= Preach (podcast) =

Mormon podcast

Presentation
- Hosted by: Lee Hale
- Genre: Religion and spirituality podcast
- Language: English
- Length: 20–30 Minutes

Production
- No. of seasons: 2
- No. of episodes: 26

Publication
- Original release: August 22, 2019 – April 17, 2020
- Provider: KUER

Related
- Related shows: Mormon Stories Podcast; On Being
- Website: preachpod.org

Preach is a religion and spirituality podcast about the "messiness of faith", which is hosted by Mormon reporter Lee Hale and produced by KUER.

A short trailer for the show was published on September 6, 2019 and the first episode was published later that month. The first episode of the show discusses Mormonism and women and premarital exams in particular. Lee Hale was featured on the Mormon Land podcast. Lee Hale interviewed a gay Mormon named Addison Jenkins. The final episode was published on April 17, 2020 because Lee Hale was moving to a job for NPR as an editor and producer of All Things Considered.

Throughout the podcast Hale discusses how he has struggled with faith and interviews other people who have experienced similar struggles. Lee Hale discussed the origins and the reboot of the VeggieTales on NPR. Hale spends an episode interviewing Glynn Washington and his experiences with The Worldwide Church of God.
