= Bubble (podcast) =

Sci-fi podcast and graphic novel

Related
- Website: maximumfun.org/podcasts/bubble/

Bubble is a scripted science fiction podcast produced by Maximum Fun and created by Jordan Morris and Jesse Thorn. The podcast was later adapted into a graphic novel published by First Second Books.

== Background ==
The podcast was created by Jordan Morris and Jesse Thorn and produced by Maximum Fun. The podcast focuses on a town called Fairhaven, which is situated inside a protective bubble surrounded by wilderness. The protagonist of the story is a woman who grew up outside the bubble named Morgan. Morgan teams up with two guys and starts killing monsters that have gotten inside the bubble for a contracting company. The show is an eight episode satirical science fiction podcast with a sitcom style delivery.

== Reception ==
Becca James wrote in BuzzFeed News that the podcast is as "addictive as it is absurd." Laura Jane Standley and Eric McQuade wrote in The Atlantic that the "sound engineering is appropriately cartoonish." Megh Wright wrote in Vulture that the podcast "gets funnier the deeper you go." Apple Podcasts included the show on their list of the best podcasts of 2018. Cory Doctrow wrote in Boing Boing that the podcast is "hilarious." Nicholas Quah wrote in NiemanLab that the podcast is "super zany."

== Adaptations ==
The graphic novel is 272 pages long. The graphic novel was published by First Second Books and written by Jordan Morris and Sarah Morgan. The art is done by Tony Cliff. The graphic novel was published on July 13, 2021. Publishers Weekly gave the graphic novel a starred review, saying that the book is a "recklessly fun, hoot and holler of a ride". Caitlin Rosberg wrote in The A. V. Club that "some of the references aren't exactly evergreen". Colin Moon wrote in AIPT Comics that the book has "an exciting, vivid world you can't help but want to know more about". The book was also nominated for a 2022 Eisner Award.

In May 2020, Sony Pictures Animation announced that an animated film adaptation was in development, with Morris set to write the script. Seth Rogen and Evan Goldberg, who previously worked on Sausage Party, signed on to produce through their company Point Grey Pictures, alongside Matt Tolmach. James Weaver, Kyle Hunter, David Manpearl, Ariel Shaffir and Morris were announced as executive producers.
