= Helen Zaltzman =

English podcaster, broadcaster and writer

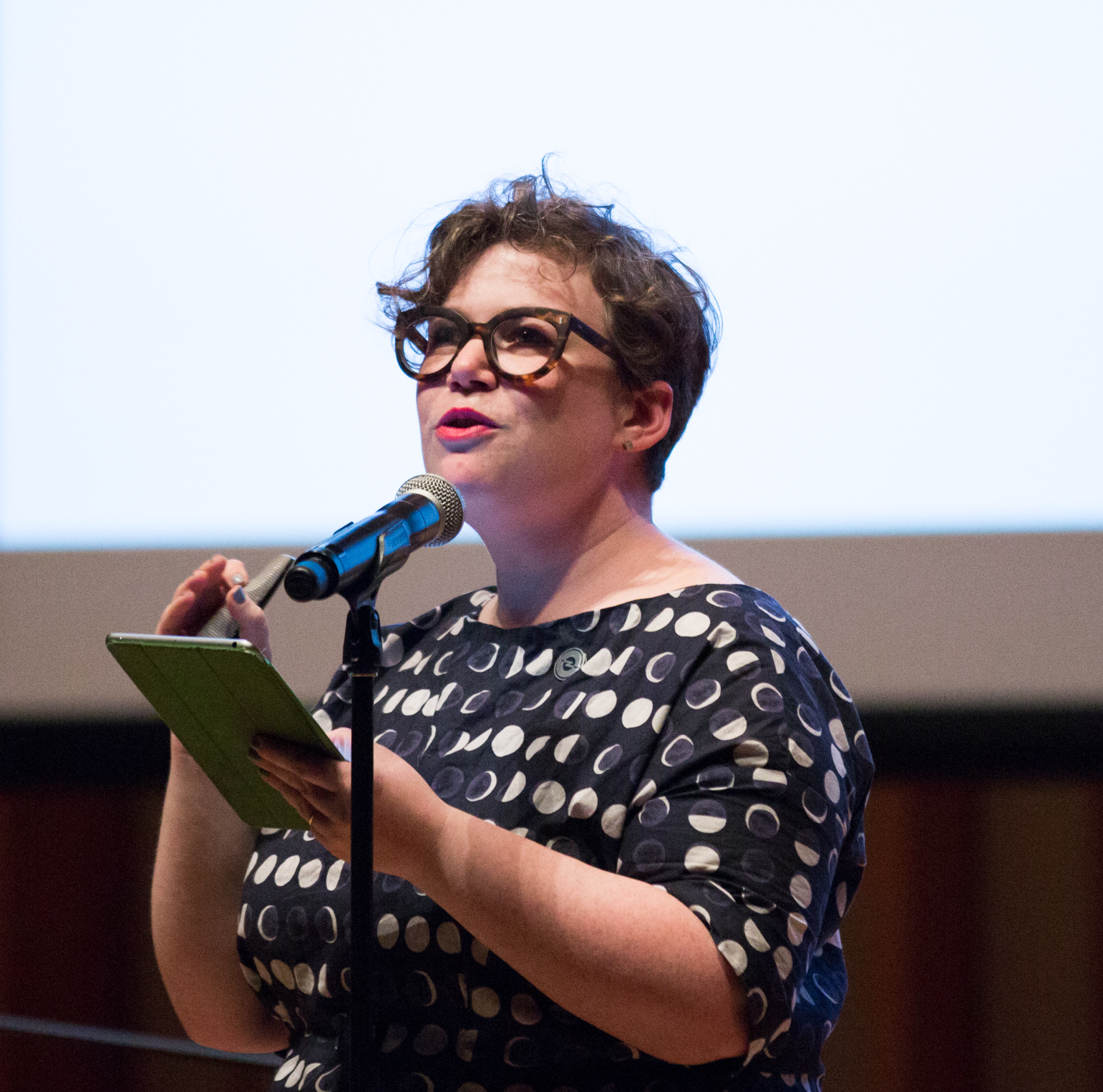
- Helen Zaltzman performing in Los Angeles, 2017
- Born: April 22, 1980 (age 46); Kent, England
- Notable work: Answer Me This! (podcast); The Allusionist
- Spouse: Martin Austwick
- Relatives: Andy Zaltzman (brother)

Comedy career
- Medium: Broadcaster; Podcaster
- Website: helenzaltzman.com

Helen Zaltzman is an English podcaster, broadcaster and writer. She produces the linguistics podcast The Allusionist, the entertainment podcast Answer Me This!, and the Veronica Mars recap podcast Veronica Mars Investigations.

== Career ==
=== Answer Me This! ===
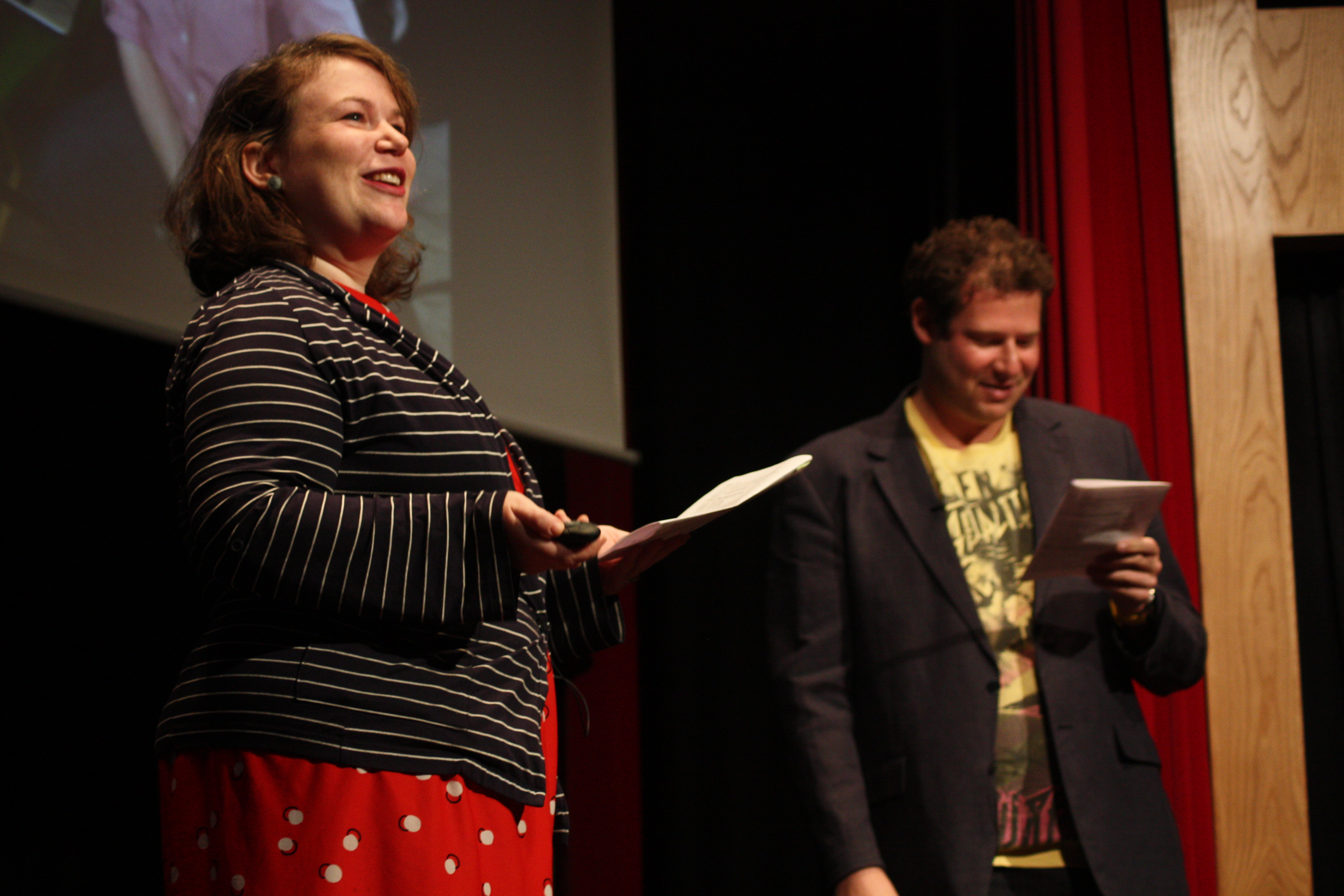
Zaltzman and Mann in 2012

Zaltzman began the comedy podcast Answer Me This! with Olly Mann in 2007. The duo met in 2000 studying at St Catherine's College, Oxford. The podcast began in Zaltzman's living room in Crystal Palace, London, with assistance from Martin Austwick (a.k.a. "Martin the Sound Man" and later Zaltzman's husband). In 2009, Zaltzman and Mann made history by being the first podcasters to be given their own national show on BBC Radio 5 Live, Web 2009 with Helen and Olly. They went on to present several other specials for BBC Radio 5 Live.

The podcast won a silver Sony Award in 2010 and gold in 2011, and in 2012 a European Podcast Award. It has been voted one of the Top 10 Comedy Podcasts in the World by The Guardian. It has received critical plaudits in numerous publications including Q, The Times, Time Out, and Radio Times. Due to the podcast's success, Faber and Faber published a companion book in November 2010.

=== The Allusionist ===
In January 2015, Zaltzman launched a new linguistics podcast called The Allusionist. Zaltzman was the first British broadcaster on the Radiotopia podcast network. The Guardian describes the Allusionist as "an antidote to all the whither-life-and-how-to-understand-it podcasts". The Allusionist was iTunes UK's best new podcast of 2015. At the 2018 British Podcast Awards it was named ‘Smartest Podcast’ and Zaltzman was awarded ‘Podcast Champion’. The Allusionist left the Radiotopia network in October 2020.

=== Veronica Mars Investigations ===
In August 2019, Zaltzman launched an episode-by-episode recap podcast of the TV show Veronica Mars, with co-host Jenny Owen Youngs, musician and co-host of Buffering the Vampire Slayer podcast.

=== Other audio ===
Zaltzman is a regular on The Bugle podcast, hosted by her brother Andy, and has appeared on podcasts including The Bugle Presents... The Last Post, Jordan, Jesse, Go!, The Chuck Tingle Podcast, Hello from the Magic Tavern, Ologies, 99% Invisible, Potterless and ZigZag.

Mann and Zaltzman were internet correspondents on BBC Radio 5 Live's Saturday Edition and on Steve Wright in the Afternoon. She was a panellist on the third series of Charlie Brooker's So Wrong It's Right and won. She hosted the Radio 4 show Four Thought during 2016–2017. She has appeared on Woman's Hour, The News Quiz, The Richard Bacon Show, Transatlantic with Rory Bremner and Ian Collins's radio show, and was one of the contributors to discussions about the 2012 Olympics on BBC Radio Scotland. She has guested on podcasts, including The Guardian's Media Talk and Maximum Fun's International Waters, Potterless, Judge John Hodgman and guest-presented a special edition of the Radio Academy's Radio Talk.

Zaltzman was a judge in 2012 on the Sony Awards. In May 2013, Zaltzman began hosting a monthly podcast for Sound Women, an organisation which campaigns against sex discrimination in the radio industry. In September 2020, Zaltzman hosted the Duocon 2020 Livestream, a world-wide live conference for the language learning platform Duolingo.

=== Writing ===
Zaltzman is a comedy writer, with radio credits including The Now Show, The Milk Run on Radio 1, and Newsjack, and TV credits including Celebrity Juice, Keith Lemon's Lemonaid, Britain Unzipped, and Animal Antics. She has written for The Observer, Classical Music Magazine, The Big Issue, The Daily Telegraph, The Times, and the BBC.

=== Performance ===
Zaltzman is a crafter, and has painted numerous posters for comedians' Edinburgh shows. She has created props, including a giant inflatable Boggle set; dinosaur costumes; and dolls of Tony Benn, Robert Plant, and Donald Rumsfeld.

Zaltzman has acted in plays at the Edinburgh Festival Fringe, and will occasionally perform live comedy, most often with Josie Long and Robin Ince. In 2007, during a three-week run of Long's show Trying is Good at the Soho Theatre, she sat onstage embroidering a quilt depicting scenes from the show. In 2010, Zaltzman and Mann wrote and starred in a series of videos around Britain, Great British Questions, in association with Visit Britain. In April 2017, Zaltzman delivered a talk entitled 'Writing as a form of time travel' on the main stage at TED2017.

== Personal life ==
Zaltzman is the younger sister of comedian Andy Zaltzman and the daughter of South African sculptor Zack Zaltzman. She is of Lithuanian-Jewish descent, and is an atheist. She grew up in Tunbridge Wells and won a scholarship to Sevenoaks School, then studied English at St Catherine's College, Oxford. In April 2011, she married musician and physicist Martin Austwick after a nine-year relationship. In April 2023, she confirmed that she and Austwick had relocated to Canada.
