= Answer Me This! =

Comedy podcast

- Genre: Comedy

Cast and voices
- Hosted by: Helen Zaltzman; Olly Mann

Publication
- No. of episodes: 414
- Original release: January 2007 – August 2021; one-off return: 2023; resumed: 2025–present

Reception
- Ratings: 4.7368421052631575/5
- Cited as: Best Internet Programme (Silver, 2010; Gold, 2011) Radio Academy Awards; Gold Award, 2021 British Podcast Awards

Related
- Website: answermethispodcast.com

Answer Me This! is a comedy podcast by Helen Zaltzman and Olly Mann first broadcast in 2007, in which they answer questions submitted by the general public. It was one of the first independent British podcasts to gain success, and led to both Zaltzman and Mann establishing careers as professional podcasters. Initially produced weekly, the podcast became fortnightly in January 2014 and then monthly in December 2016. The series originally ended with its 400th episode on 5 August 2021, but returned for one further episode in 2023. On 2 January 2025 — the 18th 'birthday' of the podcast — it was announced that Answer Me This! would return, at first for three new episodes over three months at the start of the year. However, the return was soon thereafter expanded indefinitely to a monthly show.

Answer Me This! was nominated for Sony Radio Academy Awards in 2009, 2010 and 2011, in the category "Best Internet Programme"; in 2010, the podcast won the silver award and in 2011, it won the gold award. In 2021 the podcast received a special Gold Award from the British Podcast Awards, honouring its status in the development of British podcasting.

== Cast ==
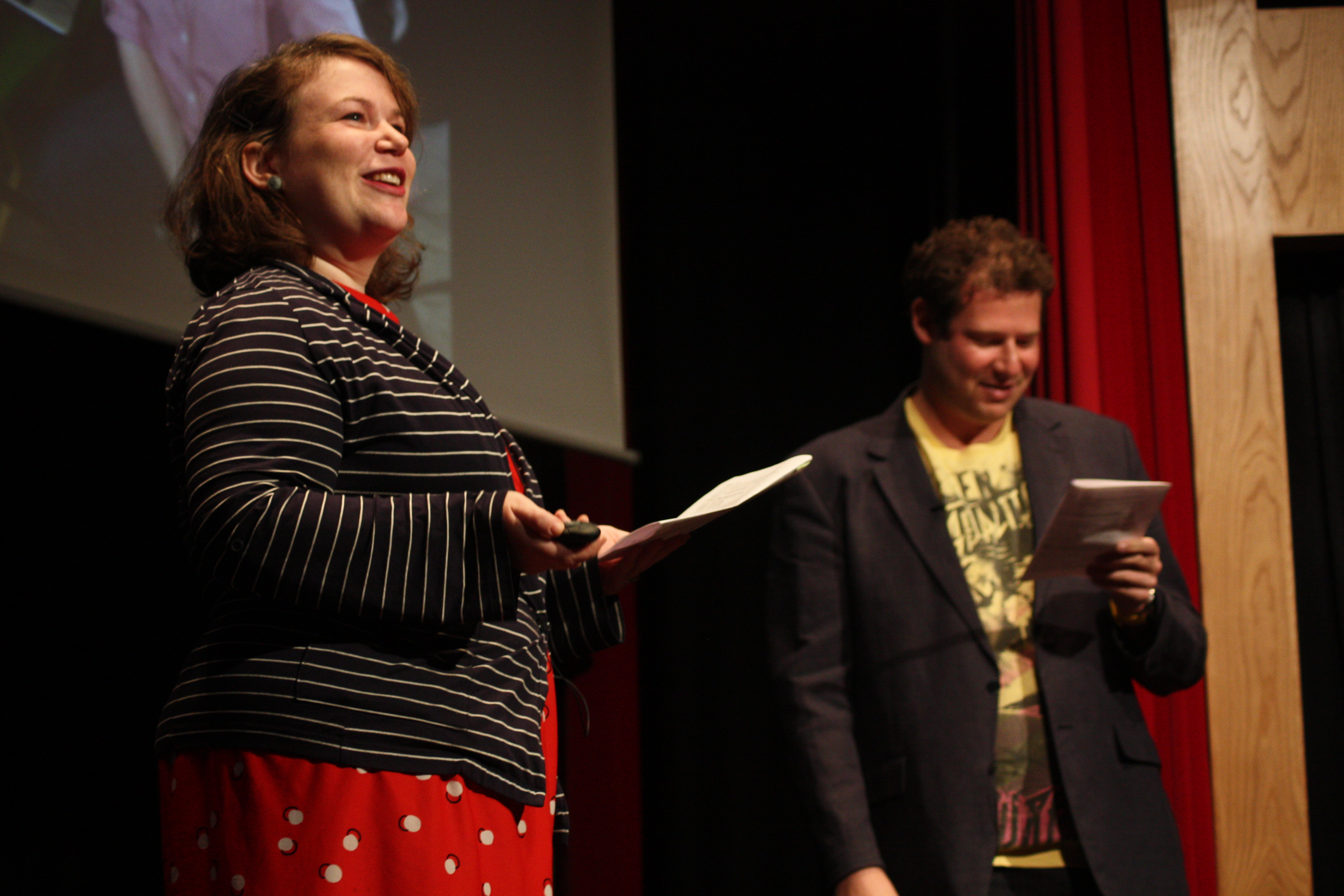
Zaltzman and Mann in 2012

Answer Me This! is hosted by Zaltzman, Mann, and Martin Austwick (a.k.a. "Martin the Sound Man"). Since founding the podcast, all three have become professional podcasters. Prior to this, Mann's background was in presenting and broadcasting, featuring as a pundit on Sky News, BBC Radio 5 Live and BBC Breakfast, and as presenter on radio stations such as LBC, BBC Radio 4 and Magic FM. Zaltzman started her career primarily as a writer, writing comedy for BBC Radio 1 and Radio 4, and with credits on several TV shows. She also wrote book reviews for The Observer and copy for several newspapers and magazines, as well as performing live with Josie Long and Robin Ince's Book Club and School for Gifted Children. Zaltzman and Mann met at St Catherine's College, Oxford, where they both studied English. Austwick, a musician and singer, has a DPhil in quantum physics and was a full-time university lecturer until 2017; he now works full-time in podcasting, both presenting and creating music for podcasts as well as producing them. In 2011, Zaltzman and Austwick got married, with Austwick subsequently changing his name to Martin Zaltz Austwick.

== Format ==
The format of the show is Zaltzman and Mann answering listeners' questions, submitted via email, answerphone or (until its closure) Skype, with subjects ranging from personal problems and factual queries to philosophical dilemmas or everyday petty quibbles. The episodes are punctuated by jingles, many of which feature comedians Joanna Neary, Holly Walsh, Tom Price, Lizzie Roper and Stuart Goldsmith, and musicians Martin White, Jay Foreman, and Gavin Osborn. As well as the regular episodes, Answer Me This released several paid-for themed albums. The first of these, a March 2012 album titled Jubilee, featured material about the British royal family, while subsequent albums were Sports Day, Holidays, Christmas, Love and Home Entertainment. The albums all placed in the UK iTunes album chart.

A book adaptation of the podcast, called Answer Me This!, was published by Faber & Faber on 4 November 2010 and features questions from the podcast as well as brand new ones.

== Critical success ==
The show has been Critic's Choice in numerous national publications, including The Times, Time Out, Radio Times, Q Magazine, and The Independent. On 27 July 2009, the show was chosen by The Guardian as one of its "Top 10 comedy podcasts in the world"; the following day, The London Paper also named the show in its chart of the "Top 10 homemade podcasts in the UK".

== Radio show ==
Zaltzman and Mann worked together on several radio shows, building on the success of Answer me This, becoming the first presenters in the UK to move from podcasting into national radio. "Web 2009 with Helen and Olly" was broadcast on Radio 5 Live on 31 December 2009. A second programme, called "Web 2010 with Helen and Olly" was broadcast on Radio 5 Live on 4 July 2010. In 2014, they presented a two-part Radio 4 documentary called "Podcasting - The First Ten Years".

== Luxembourg audience ==
In December 2007, frustrated at having only reached as high as number 21 in the UK iTunes charts, the Answer Me This! team spent one day in Luxembourg attempting to crack the Luxembourg iTunes top 20. Their publicity stunts, including giving away free biscuits at the Christmas market and appearing on the ARA City Radio breakfast show (Luxembourg's only English-speaking radio station), saw them reach number 13 in the charts within only 24 hours. They then went on to reach number 3 by the end of the week.
