= Becoming Wise =

2016 book by Krista Tippett

Becoming Wise: An Inquiry into the Mystery and Art of Living
- First edition
- Author: Krista Tippett
- Language: English
- Subject: Religion; philosophy; psychology
- Publisher: Penguin Press
- Publication date: 2016
- Publication place: United States
- Media type: Print (hardcover & paperback)
- Pages: 304
- ISBN: 978-1-59420-680-1 (hardcover)
- Dewey Decimal: 158.1
- LC Class: BJ1589 .T57 2016

Becoming Wise: An Inquiry into the Mystery and Art of Living is a book by Krista Tippett (ISBN 978-1594206801) which discusses the values and questions raised in the author's primary work, On Being, an award-winning podcast and radio program. A parallel podcast by the same name was released in tandem with the book. Becoming Wise: An Inquiry into the Mystery and Art of Living was published by Penguin Press in 2016. As the chapter titles suggest, the book focuses on five main concepts: words, flesh, love, faith, and hope.
