= Tell Them, I Am =

Islamic podcast

- Genre: Religion and spirituality podcast; Interview podcast
- Language: American English

Creative team
- Created by: Misha Euceph

Cast and voices
- Hosted by: Misha Euceph

Production
- Length: 15-30 Minutes

Publication
- No. of seasons: 2
- No. of episodes: 45
- Original release: May 3, 2019
- Provider: Higher Ground Productions; Spotify Studios
- Updates: Daily

Related
- Website: podcasts.apple.com/us/podcast/tell-them-i-am/id1458776739/

Tell Them, I Am is an interview podcast hosted and created by Misha Euceph, featuring all Muslim voices. The podcast is about the small moments that define who we are and who we are not.

== Background ==
The podcast features stories from actors, performers, athletes, artists, and activists. The first season of the podcast was launched on the first day of Ramadan in 2019, and the second in Ramadan 2021. The podcast produced episodes on a daily basis throughout Ramadan. The podcast is presented by the Obamas’ production company, Higher Ground, as a Spotify Original, and produced by Dustlight Productions. Misha Euceph is the creator, host, and executive producer of the podcast and the founder of Dustlight Productions. Euceph begins each episode with a short story about herself. The podcast has interviewed musical guests such as Mvstermind, Yuna, and Zakir Hussain. Other guests have included Alia Shawkat, Ramy Youssef, and Tan France.
