= The Digital Sisterhood =

Muslim podcast

The Digital Sisterhood is a podcast that was started in Toronto, Canada and is created by nine Muslim women. The show is hosted by Cadar Mohamud and does interviews with Muslim women. The show won a Shorty Award.

== Background ==
The show was started in Toronto, Canada. The show developed out of a youth program for Muslim girls called Together Sisters. The podcast is created by nine black Muslim women. The show does interviews with Muslim women. The show started its third season in Spring of 2023. Muna Scekomar is one of the shows founders as well as an editor and producer for the show. Scekomar worked as a producer on the NPR show called Terrible, Thanks for Asking as an intern.

The show won an Audience Honor and a Silver Honor in the Art and Culture Podcasts category during the 15th annual Shorty Awards in 2023. The show reached number 4 on the chart of top new shows and was number 1 in the Islam and Spirituality category in the United States, United Kingdom, New Zealand, and Australia. The show became the second most listened to podcast in the United Kingdom. The show reach the number one spot in the Self-improvement Category in the United States, the United Kingdom, and Australia.

== See also ==
- List of religion and spirituality podcasts
