= Shameless (podcast) =

Australian pop culture podcast

- Genre: Pop culture, Interview
- Language: English

Cast and voices
- Hosted by: Zara McDonald; Michelle Andrews

Production
- Production: Shameless Media
- Length: 50 minutes

Publication
- No. of episodes: 500
- Original release: March 12, 2018

Related
- Website: shamelessmedia.com.au

Shameless is a celebrity and pop culture podcast hosted by Melbourne journalists Zara McDonald and Michelle Andrews. Created "for smart people who love dumb stuff", Shameless delves into the pop culture stories of the week in every Monday episode. The New York Times described Shameless as "a fun one for pop aficionados... it feels like chiming into a conversation between two very up-to-date friends." Shameless launched on March 12, 2018, with weekly Monday episodes. Later that year, Andrews and McDonald launched Thursday In Conversation episodes, in which they interviewed a well-known person, but this was later replaced by SCANDAL in 2021, where the hosts revisit one of the biggest celebrity controversies in history and unpack it with a modern lens.

After Shameless Podcast's success, Andrews and McDonald launched Shameless Media: an independent media company that publishes podcasts, newsletters, and builds social media communities. As of 2023, Shameless Media publishes gossip podcast everybody has a secret, literature-focused The Shameless Book Club, and relationships show Love etc.

== History ==
Michelle Andrews and Zara McDonald first worked together as colleagues at women's media company Mamamia, where they pitched the podcast concept for Shameless. Upon its rejection, the pair began working on Shameless independently, and left their roles at Mamamia to pursue the podcast free of network support. They began recording the podcast from home, sticking 'Shameless Podcast' posters inside girls' bathrooms at universities, and engaging with listeners on social media.

As of October 2023, the podcast had over 70 million downloads and had been written about in The New York Times, The Guardian, The Age, Marie Claire, and The Sydney Morning Herald.

Their first book "The Space Between" was released on the 1st of September 2020. Their second book, '4am: Answers to the conundrums that keep you up at night', came out in October 2023.

== See also ==
- List of comedy podcasts
