= This Being Human =

Muslim art and culture podcast

- Genre: Religion and spirituality; Arts and culture; Islam
- Format: Interview
- Country of origin: Canada
- Language: English

Creative team
- Created by: Aga Khan Museum

Cast and voices
- Hosted by: Abdul-Rehman Malik

Production
- Direction: Nadir Mohamed; Shabin Mohamed
- Production: Stuart Coxe
- Length: 20–40 minutes

Publication
- No. of seasons: 3
- No. of episodes: 56
- Original release: January 26, 2021
- Provider: Antica Productions; TVO
- Updates: Bi-weekly

Related
- Website: portal.agakhanmuseum.org/podcasts/index.html

This Being Human is an interview podcast hosted by Abdul-Rehman Malik that focuses on Muslim art and culture. The podcast was created by the Aga Khan Museum and produced by Antica Productions.

== Background ==
The Aga Khan Museum is North America's first and only museum dedicated to Muslim cultures and heritage. The podcast debuted on January 26, 2021. The podcast was started during the COVID-19 pandemic. The name of the podcast is based on one of Rumi's poems called "The Guest House." The host of the podcast, Abdul-Rehman Malik, is a journalist and educator. Malik was born in Thorncliffe Park to Pakistani immigrants. Malik has explored his own religion and spirituality through the act of storytelling throughout his career as a journalist. He has worked at the Toronto Star and the Canadian Broadcasting Corporation. In each episode Malik interviews someone who has been influenced by the religion and culture of Islam. Malik has interviewed people like Roni Helou and Farah Alibay on the show. The show was relaunched by TVO on February 22, 2022 for a second season. The first episode of the second season featured an interview with Zarqa Nawaz.
