= Oh No, Ross and Carrie! =

Skeptical, investigative-journalism podcast

- Genre: Science; spirituality; medicine; paranormal; Religion and spirituality podcast
- Language: English

Cast and voices
- Hosted by: Ross Blocher; Carrie Poppy

Production
- Production: Ian Kremer

Publication
- No. of episodes: 425
- Original release: March 11, 2011 – October 13, 2024
- Provider: Maximum Fun
- Updates: Weekly

Related
- Oh No, Ross and Carrie! Podcast Introduction

Oh No, Ross and Carrie! was an investigative journalism podcast produced in Los Angeles and distributed by the Maximum Fun network. The hosts personally investigated claims about spirituality, fringe science, religion, and the paranormal, then discussed their findings on the show. The motto of the podcast was "We show up so you don't have to."

== History ==
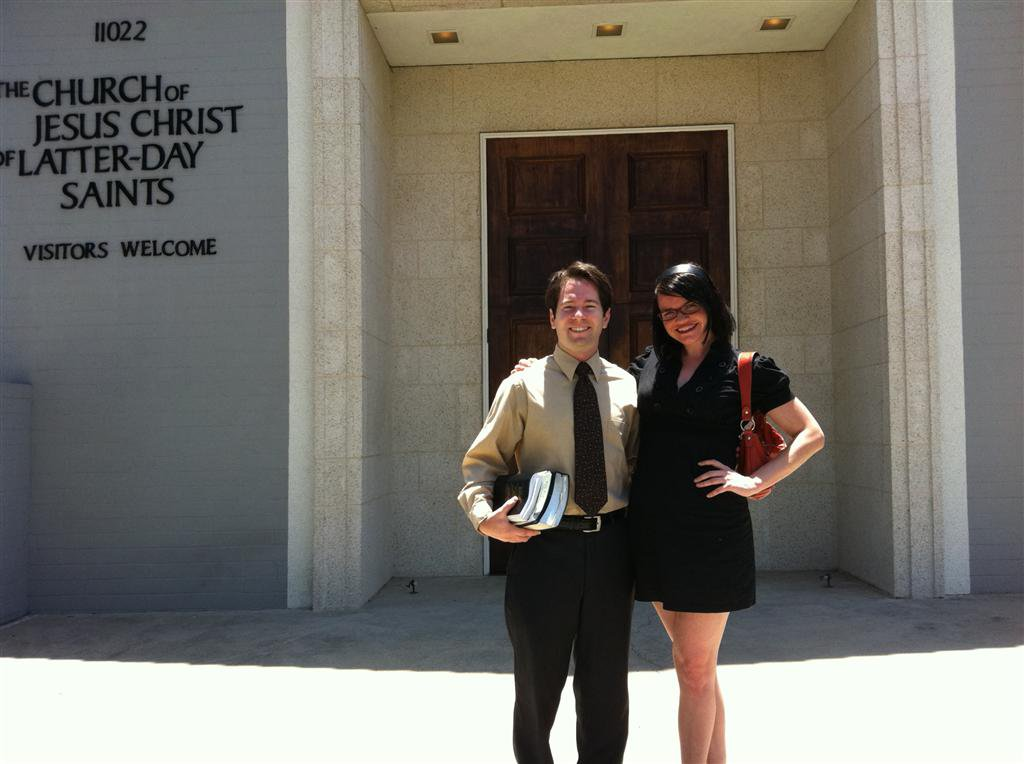
Blocher and Poppy in front of an LDS Church meetinghouse in 2011

The hosts, Ross Blocher and Carrie Poppy, met at a book club meeting at the Center for Inquiry (CFI) West, where they discovered they had a mutual love for The Simpsons television program. They were also both interested in religion and fringe science, so they decided to attend a meeting of the Kabbalah Centre in LA together and analyze the claims made there. That experience inspired them to start their own podcast centered around such investigations.

The first episode, based on their experiences at the Kabbalah Centre, was released on 10 March 2011. The show was independently distributed until it became part of the Maximum Fun network in January 2014. Funding for the hosts' investigations comes from listener donations.

Blocher and Poppy investigated a number of religious groups, fringe science claims, and alternative medicine modalities, including Mormonism, dowsing, and Reiki healing.

The podcast has been ranked among the top 100 podcasts on iTunes in Australia, Canada, the United Kingdom, and the United States. The highest ranking it has achieved in each country is #30 in Australia, #28 in Canada, #93 in the UK, and #36 in the U.S. It has also been one of the most downloaded podcasts on iTunes in the Religion and Spirituality category, ranking as high as #11 on 9 February 2014.

On October 13, 2024, the Maximum Fun podcast network released a joint statement from the hosts announcing the end of the show for the foreseeable future. All of their episodes will remain available via the Maximum Fun website.

=== Scientology investigation ===
Beginning in February 2016, they released a series of episodes about their investigation of the Church of Scientology. In their first Scientology episode, the pair state that an investigation of Scientology was their most frequent request. The Scientology episodes were recommended by The Guardian, The A.V. Club, Boing Boing, and SplitSider. As of August 2020, there are ten episodes devoted to the Scientology investigation – 9 original episodes in 2016, and a follow-up episode in 2017. Former senior Scientology executive Mike Rinder said of one episode that "the insight into the current state of affairs inside LA Org is revelatory" because Blocher was the only person in attendance at the introductory classes, despite Scientology's claims that their Los Angeles site is an ideal example of Scientology's success.

=== Awards ===
Award	Year	Category	Result	Ref.
Academy of Podcasters	2015	Spirituality & Religion	Finalist	
Podcast Awards	2016	Religion & Spirituality	Won	

== Format ==
Most episodes featured Blocher and Poppy talking about their experiences during a recent investigation they performed, while some episodes are based on interviews with guests who have some relation to a recent investigation. The investigations usually took place in the Los Angeles area, although some occurred in other areas of California and Arizona, or even internationally. When investigating a claim, the hosts generally attended meetings or sessions having conducted little background research in order to get a feel for what the average person would experience. They performed the investigations undercover and only reveal that they were journalists if asked. On one occasion, when investigating Ordo Templi Orientis, they used assumed names to protect their identities. Some investigations are continued over the span of more than one episode.

The hosts have even gone so far as to be baptized into the Church of Jesus Christ of Latter-day Saints and the Raëlian UFO religion to more fully explore the teachings of these religions. Poppy was also certified as a Reiki healer in the course of an investigation.

At the end of each investigation, the hosts subjectively rated the level of pseudoscience, creepiness, danger, and cost (or "pocket drainer" value) of the claim or group they studied using ten-point scales. The pseudoscience rating is based on a scale in which the theory of evolution has a score of 1 (completely scientific) and the idea that humans are made completely of goat sperm has a score of 10 (completely pseudoscientific). Poppy also frequently gives a "hot drink" rating, at the end of the investigation.

The show was produced by Ian Kremer, and the theme music was created by Brian Keith Dalton, producer of the Mr. Deity video series.

Blocher and Poppy intermittently perform a live version of the show. In an interview with Richard Saunders Blocher said that the live show gives them a great opportunity to "meet people in person and know that our message... of having fun with zany beliefs resonates with people"

== Guests ==
In addition to episodes about investigations, Blocher and Poppy have also released episodes based on interviews with guests who have some relation to or expertise in the subject of a recent investigation. Notable guests include:

- Brian Keith Dalton, producer of Mr. Deity
- Mark Edward, mentalist and psychic entertainer
- Emery Emery, comedian and podcast host
- Susan Gerbic, skeptical activist
- Roger Nygard, film director
- Don Prothero, paleontologist
- Mike Rinder, former Scientologist
- Jon Ronson, author
- Eugenie Scott, anthropologist and advocate for evolution education
- Louis Theroux, documentary filmmaker who made My Scientology Movie

== Hosts ==
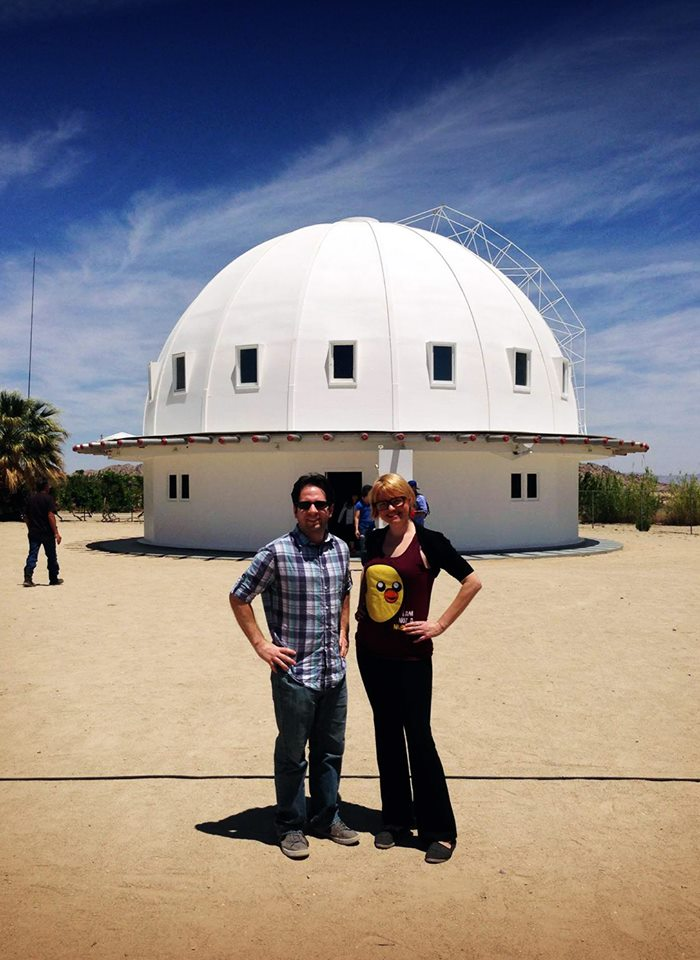
Blocher and Poppy investigate the Integratron

Ross Blocher lives in the Los Angeles area. He works as a Training Project Manager at Walt Disney Animation Studios, and has a BFA in animation from Woodbury University, He has worked in technical capacities on films such as The Simpsons Movie, The Princess and the Frog and Frozen. Blocher also investigates fringe science and spirituality with the Independent Investigations Group. Both of Blocher's parents were teachers of mathematics.

Carrie Poppy is a writer and actress living in Los Angeles. She studied theater and philosophy at the University of the Pacific, then studied improvisation and sketch comedy at The Groundlings. She previously worked for the James Randi Educational Foundation and currently writes an investigative column for Skeptical Inquirer magazine. She is vegan and active in the animal rights movement.

Both Blocher and Poppy are former evangelical Christians but are no longer religious believers.

Blocher and Poppy presented a workshop on investigation techniques, along with the hosts of the MonsterTalk podcast, at The Amaz!ng Meeting 2012. At that same meeting, Poppy gave a talk on the importance of using inclusive language when reaching out to people with beliefs that are different from one's own.

== See also ==
- Religion and spirituality podcast
- List of religion and spirituality podcasts
