= The Weekly Show with Jon Stewart =

2024 news and comedy podcast hosted by Jon Stewart

- Genre: News, Comedy, Politics
- Format: Audio and video podcast
- Language: English

Cast and voices
- Hosted by: Jon Stewart

Production
- Production: Paramount Audio; MTV Entertainment Studios; Busboy Productions
- Length: 45–60 minutes

Publication
- No. of episodes: 84+
- Original release: June 6, 2024; 2 years ago
- Updates: Active

Reception
- Ratings: 796,000+ YouTube subscribers 110+ million YouTube views

The Weekly Show with Jon Stewart is an American news and comedy video podcast hosted by comedian and political commentator Jon Stewart. Produced by Paramount Audio and MTV Entertainment Studios in association with Stewart's Busboy Productions, the podcast debuted on June 6, 2024. It serves as an audio companion to Stewart's work on Comedy Central's The Daily Show, although the show also has accompanying video on YouTube.

== Background and launch ==
Following the cancellation of his Apple TV+ series The Problem with Jon Stewart in October 2023, Stewart returned to Comedy Central's The Daily Show in February 2024 to host its Monday night broadcasts through the 2024 election cycle.

On May 9, 2024, MTV Entertainment Studios and Paramount Audio officially announced that Stewart was expanding his partnership with the network to launch a standalone weekly podcast. Joking about his workload in the press release, Stewart stated, "After much reflection, meditation, and prayer, I have decided to extend my work week to two days."

A trailer for the podcast was released on May 30, 2024, and the inaugural episode premiered on June 6, 2024.

== Format ==
The Weekly Show releases new audio episodes every Thursday across major syndication platforms, with video versions uploaded to YouTube the following Friday. The podcast features long-form, in-depth interviews with newsmakers, politicians, authors, and experts to discuss current events, economics, and social issues in a more expansive format than the traditional late-night television segments permitted on The Daily Show.

Guests have spanned political figures and subject-matter experts, including Senator Bernie Sanders, Representative Alexandria Ocasio-Cortez, Senator Amy Klobuchar, entrepreneur Mark Cuban, AI researcher Geoffrey Hinton, and journalist Jane Mayer.

== Viewership and metrics ==
As of June 2026, the podcast has released 84 episodes. While Paramount Audio does not publicly release exact monthly audio download figures for platforms like Spotify or Apple Podcasts, the show consistently maintains high positions on the U.S. Top Podcasts and Comedy charts.

On YouTube, the podcast's official video channel has amassed over 796,000 subscribers and generated more than 110 million total views since its launch, with long-form video interviews and YouTube Shorts contributing to its viewership.

== Reception and awards ==
The franchise's expansion into the audio space was commercially successful, with the podcast charting in the Top 10 Comedy podcasts upon its release.

In 2025, The Weekly Show with Jon Stewart won a Webby Award in the Podcasts category for "Best Host". The show was also nominated for a Shorty Award for its digital and social media impact in the News & Politics category.

== See also ==
- List of comedy podcasts
- Political podcast
