= Podcast But Outside =

American comedy podcast

- Genre: Comedy
- Language: English

Cast and voices
- Hosted by: Andrew Michaan; Cole Hersch (2019-2024)

Production
- Camera: Cam "Intern" George

Publication
- Original release: April 2019
- Provider: Headgum (2024-present)
- Updates: Weekly (2019–2023); Biweekly (2023–present)

Related
- Website: podcastbutoutside.com

Podcast But Outside is a Los Angeles–based comedy video podcast started in April 2019 by co-hosts Andrew Michaan and Cole Hersch. The title refers to the setting of the podcast, taking place in public, often in the streets of greater Los Angeles. The show seeks to interview random passersby, sometimes alongside invited special guests. A videographer, Cam George, referred to as "Intern," records the interviews, made available on YouTube and, for premium content, Patreon. In 2019, Vulture.com awarded the show with best video podcast among comedy podcasts.

== History ==
Podcast But Outside was created by Andrew Michaan and Cole Hersch and launched in April 2019.

During the COVID-19 lockdown, the show took to Omegle and featured a dating competition and video therapy sessions.

The show's 100th episode featured actor Jon Hamm, "a guest they’[d] been manifesting since the early days of the pod." After this the podcast began to feature live indoor shows in a similar format, with guests recruited by Intern from nearby streets. The show's Christmas 2021 episode featured actor Adam Scott.

The podcast joined the Headgum network in 2024, with the December 4 episode being the first one released as part of the network. The episode was also Hersch's last as a regular host of the podcast.

== Content ==
The hosts employ "deadpan humour, often bordering on satire." The edited video often shows "zoom-ins, graphics, and flashbacks to past episodes" for further entertainment. Reoccurring gags are the hosts "lying about their ages, and bleeping out other podcasts’ names because they are competition." There is an estimated 5–10% success rate in courting passersby to agree to an interview. Upon completion of the interview, guests are customarily given a single US dollar as well as a sticker for their participation.
