= Jordan Morris (screenwriter) =

American writer, podcaster and actor

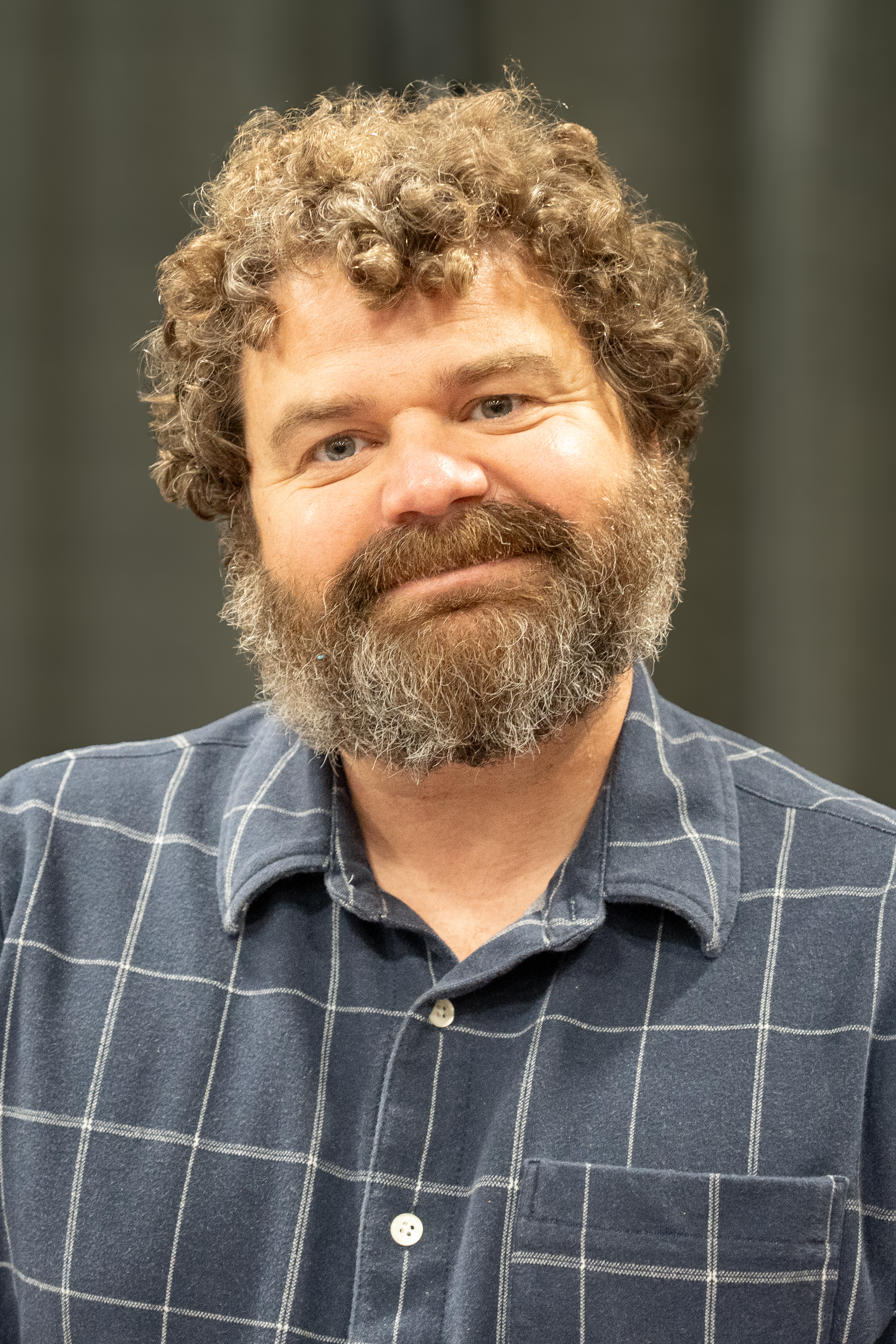
- Morris at Comic Con Oakland 2026
- Born: Jordan David Morris
- Education: University of California, Santa Cruz
- Occupations: Writer, podcaster, actor
- Writing career
- Language: English
- Genres: Horror, Comedy, SciFi/Fantasy
- Notable works: Bubble, Youth Group
- Notable awards: Eisner Awards (2 nominations)
- Website: www.jordanmorris.net

Jordan David Morris is an American writer of television and comics, podcast personality and actor. In 2000, While attending UC Santa Cruz, Morris co-hosted The Sound of Young America radio show on the college station KZSC-FM along with Jesse Thorn, and Gene O'Neill. After graduation, Thorn and Morris started the comedy chat podcast Jordan, Jesse, Go! which would become the flagship show of Thorn's podcast network Maximum Fun.

Starting as a production assistant on Living with Fran and The Ellen DeGeneres Show, Morris worked on various comedy web series including Terry on Game Shop, Cotton Candy Randy on Good Mythical Morning, and segment producer on The Daily Habit on the cable channel Fuel TV.

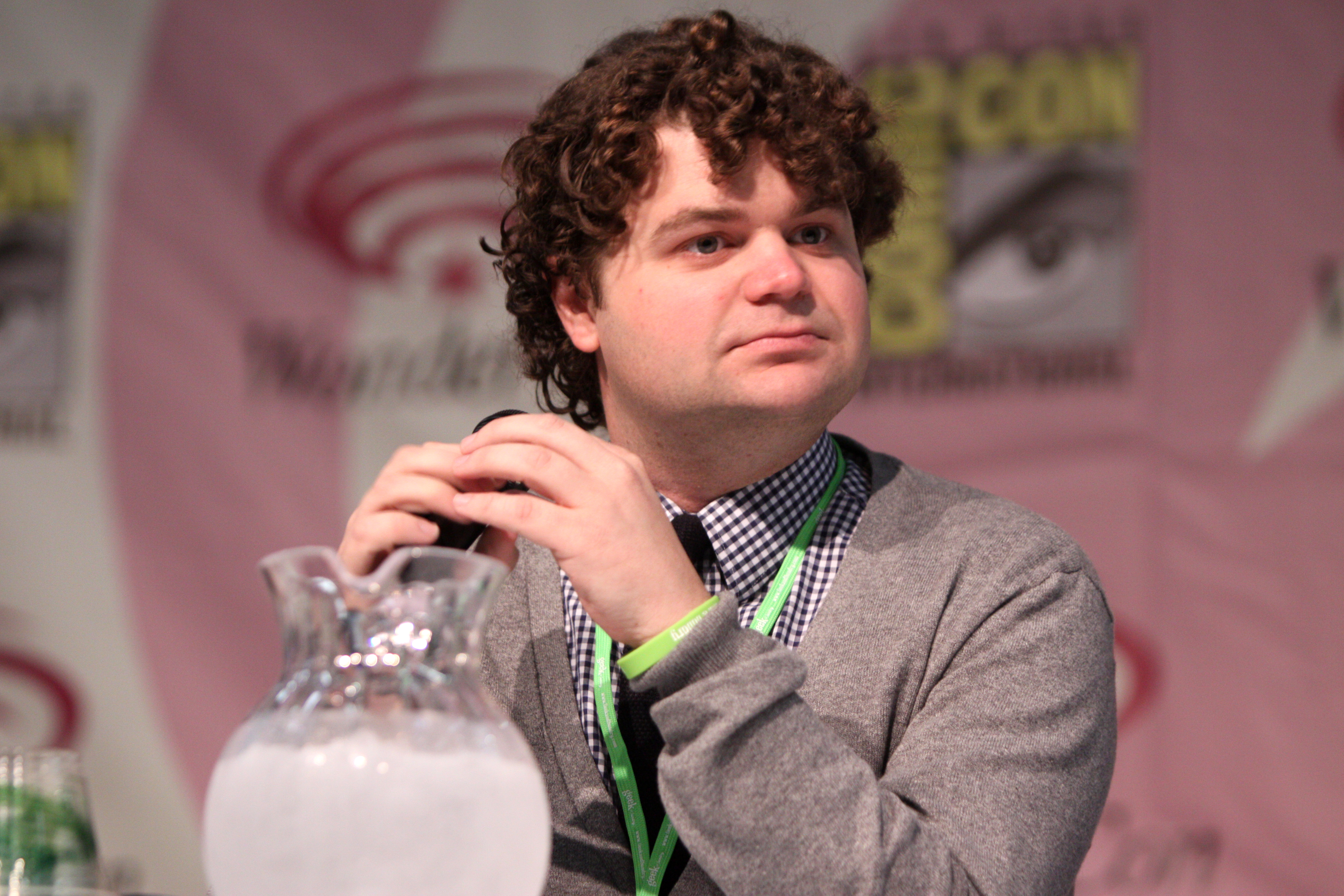
Morris speaking at the 2013 WonderCon

In 2013, Morris started writing for the comedy quiz show @midnight, and soon became regular writer on animated shows such as Unikitty!, Jellystone, and the Jim Henson Company production Earth to Ned.

In 2018, Morris released the podcast Bubble, a scripted sci-fi horror about monster hunters who live in a bubble city. Morris adapted the eight part podcast into the 2022 graphic novel of the same name, which earned two Eisner Award nominations, and is in film development. Drawing on his personal experiences attending youth ministry in the 1990s, Morris wrote Youth Group in 2024.

Since the release of these graphic novels Morris has contributed to Archie, and IDW anthologies, and new Venom and Predator series from Marvel Comics.

Since 2024, Morris has co-hosted the movie review podcast Free With Ads with fellow Good Mythical Morning contributors Emily Fleming and Matt Lieb.

== Selected Filmography ==
=== As a writer ===
Year	Title	Role	Notes
2025–2026	Teen Titans Go!	Writer	6 episodes
2024–2025	Jellystone!	Writer	6 episodes
2024	Tiny Toons Looniversity	Writer	2 episodes
2020–2021	Earth To Ned	Writer	15 episodes
2020	Trolls: TrollsTopia	Writer	6 episodes
2019	Unikitty!	Writer	3 episodes
2013–2015	@midnight	Writer	9 episodes

=== As an actor ===
Year	Title	Role	Notes
2016	Comedy Bang! Bang!	Museum Guide	Episode "Aubrey Plaza Wears a Velvet Off-the-Shoulder Gown with Flowers in Her Hair"
2014	ABCs of Death 2	Testee (segment "Q")	Credited as Jordan D. Morris
2014	You're Not You	Bored Manager	
2013	Scandal	Young Tabloid Reporter	Episode "Whiskey Tango Foxtrot"
2010	Brother's Justice	Jordan	
2009	All About Steve	Protestor Winston	

== Bibliography ==
=== Graphic Novels ===
- Bubble (2022) - Nominated for "Best Humor Publication" and "Best Adaptation from another Media" Eisner Awards
- Youth Group (2024)

=== Marvel Comics ===
- Amazing Spider-Man: Spider-Versity (Series) (2026)
- Web of Venom #1 (Series) (2026)
- Predator: Bloodshed (Five-issue Series) (2026)
- Venom #252 (2025)
- Predator: Black, White & Blood #4 (2025)
- Web of Spider-Verse: New Blood #1 (2025)

=== IDW ===
- Godzilla vs. America: Los Angeles #1 (2025)

=== Archie Comics ===
- Pop's Chock'lit Shoppe of Horrors: Fresh Meat O.S. (2024)
