= The Carlötta Beautox Chronicles =

Sitcom podcast by Ann Sloan

- Genre: Sitcom

Related
- Website: www.carlottapodcast.com

The Carlötta Beautox Chronicles is a sitcom podcast created by Ann Sloan.

== Background ==
The show is a sitcom podcast. The show is created by Ann Sloan. Sloan left a job at ABC Television to work on the podcast. The podcast received 4 out of 5 microphones in Podcast Magazine.

=== Awards ===
Award	Date	Category	Result	Ref.
Austin Film Festival	2018	Fiction Podcast	Semi-Finalist	
The Audio Verse Awards	2019	Vocal Composition in a New Production	Won	
The Discover Pod Awards	2020	Best Podcast Created or Hosted by a Woman	Finalist	
