= Krista Tippett =

American journalist, author, and entrepreneur

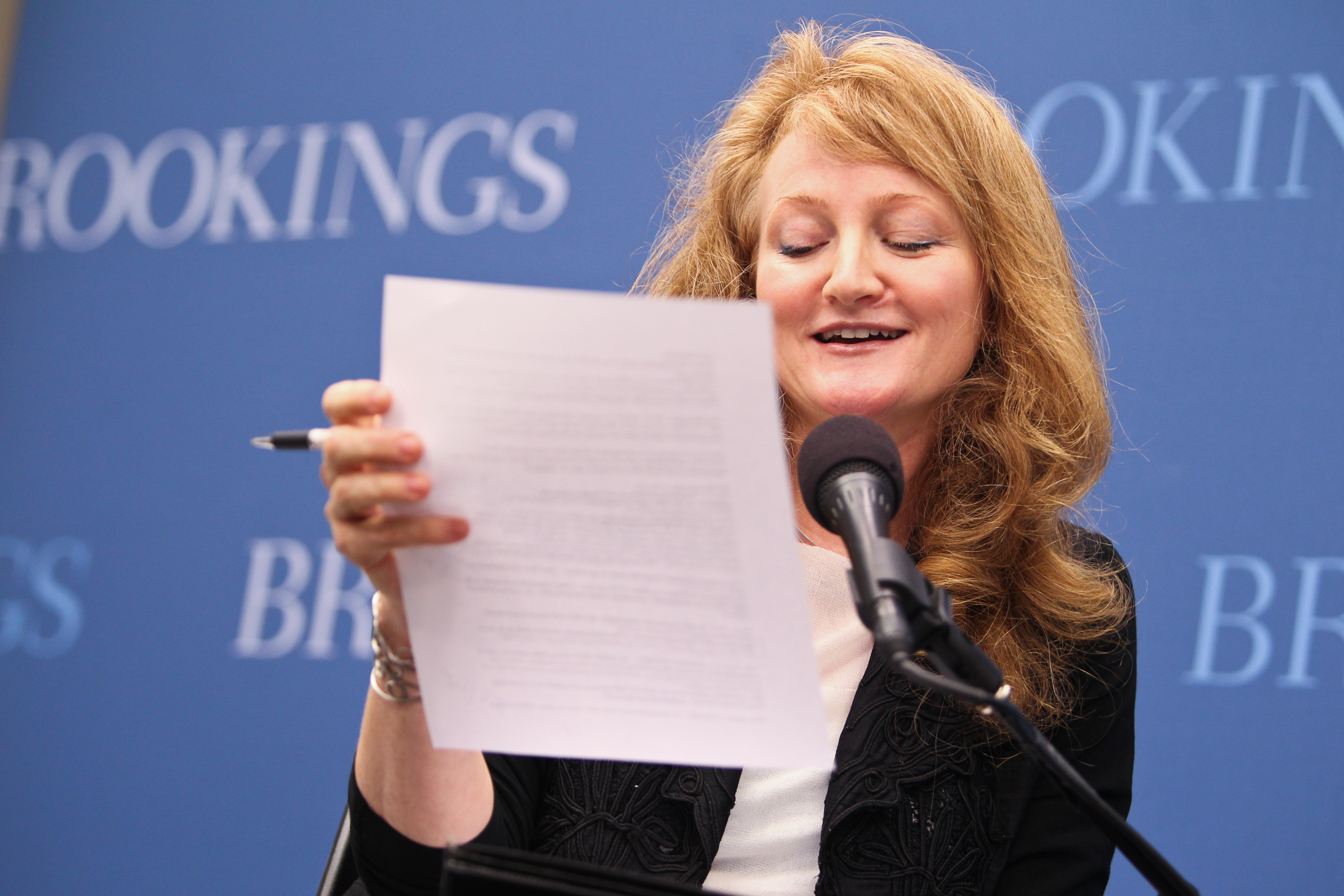
- Tippett in 2012
- Born: Krista Weedman; November 9, 1960 (age 65); United States
- Education: Brown University (BA); Yale University (MDiv)
- Occupations: Journalist; diplomat; author
- Known for: On Being
- Awards: National Humanities Medal Peabody Award
- Website: onbeing.org

Krista Tippett (née Weedmam; born November 9, 1960) is an American journalist, author, and public intellectual. Since 2003, she has served as creator and host of the Peabody Award winning program On Being. In 2014, Tippett was awarded the National Humanities Medal by U.S. president Barack Obama.

Tippett is the author of The New York Times best-selling books Becoming Wise: An Inquiry into the Mystery and Art of Living (2016), Einstein's God: Conversations About Science and the Human Spirit (2010), and Speaking of Faith: Why Religion Matters—and How to Talk About It (2008). In 2019, she was named the Mimi and Peter E. Haas Distinguished Visitor at Stanford University. In 2025, she was named a Chubb Fellow at Yale University.

== Career ==
=== Study and work abroad ===
After graduating from Brown University in 1983, Tippett was awarded a Fulbright scholarship to study at the University of Bonn in West Germany. There she worked at the Bonn bureau of The New York Times. She wrote about her experiences in Rostock in "They Just Say 'Over There'", which was published by Die Zeit in 1984. That year, she became a stringer for The New York Times in divided Berlin, establishing herself as a freelance foreign correspondent. She reported and wrote for The Times, Newsweek, the BBC, the International Herald Tribune, and Die Zeit.

In 1986, Tippett became a special political assistant to the then-senior United States diplomat in West Berlin, John C. Kornblum. The next year she became chief aide in Berlin to the U.S. ambassador to West Germany, Richard Burt. She has written that moral questions arising from that experience of seeing "high power, up close" eventually led to the spiritual, philosophical, and theological curiosities that have defined her work since.

=== Radio and non-profit media ===
Tippett received a Master of Divinity degree from Yale University in 1994. While conducting a global oral-history project for the Collegeville Institute for Ecumenical and Cultural Research at St. John's Abbey of Collegeville, Minnesota, she developed the idea for her radio show.

Tippett proposed a show about religion to Minnesota Public Radio in the late 1990s. The radio program became a monthly series in 2001 and, in 2003, a weekly national program distributed by American Public Media. In 2013, Tippett left American Public Media to co-found a non-profit production company, Krista Tippett Public Productions, which she described as "a social enterprise with a radio show at its heart". Tippett is also the co-creator and convener of the Civil Conversations Project, which she has described as "an emergent approach to healing our fractured civic spaces".

=== Interview style ===
The "Tippett style", as described by Samuel G. Freedman for the New York Times, "represents a fusion of all her parts—the child of small-town church comfortable in the pews; the product of Yale Divinity School able to parse text in Greek and theology in German; and, perhaps most of all, the diplomat seeking to resolve social divisions".

=== Awards ===
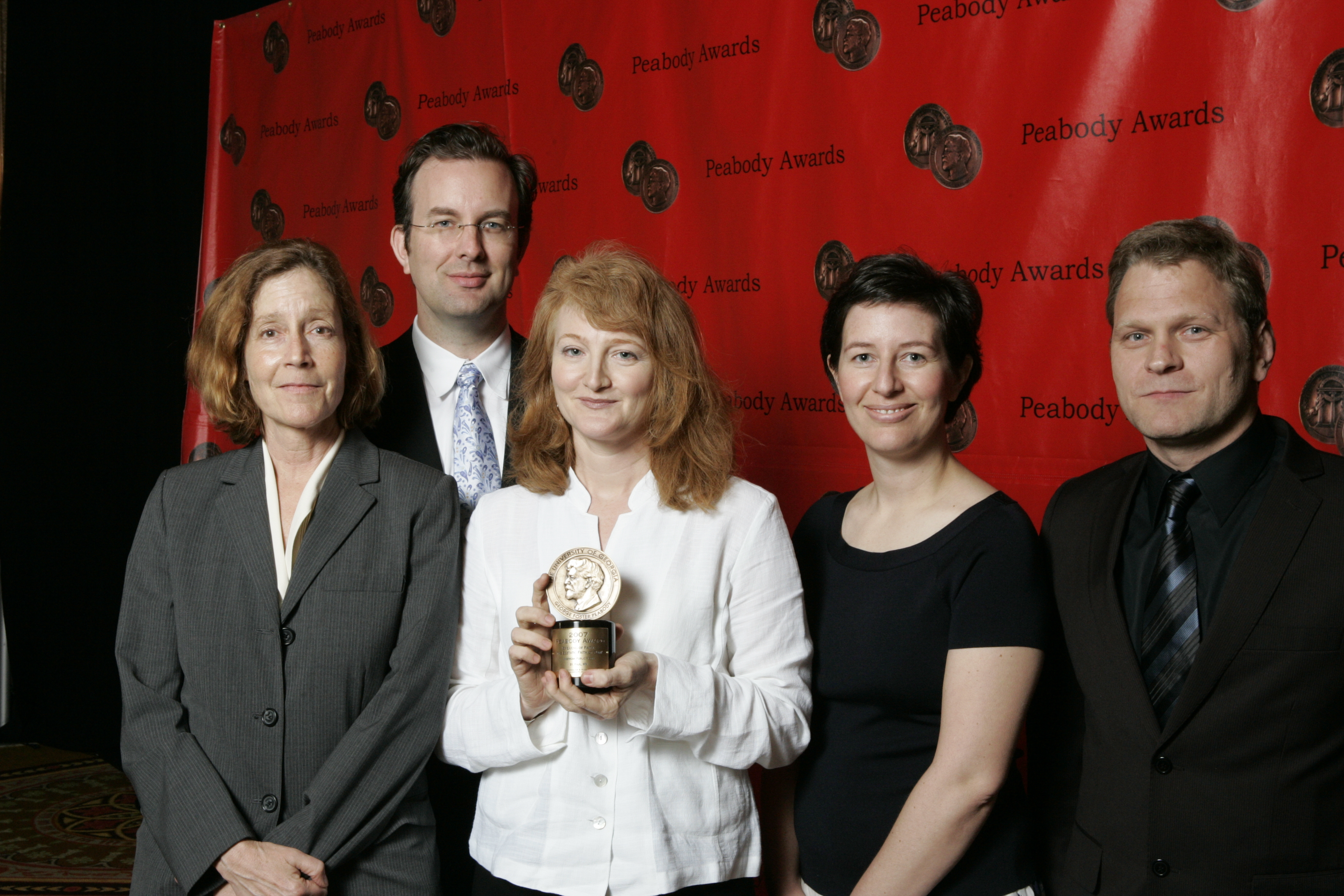
Host Krista Tippett and producers Kate Moos, Mitch Hanley, Colleen Scheck, and Trent Gilliss accept their Peabody Award for "The Ecstatic Faith of Rumi" at the 67th Annual Peabody Awards in 2008.

In July 2014, Tippett was awarded the 2013 National Humanities Medal at the White House for "thoughtfully delving into the mysteries of human existence." She received a George Foster Peabody Award in 2008 for "The Ecstatic Faith of Rumi" and three Webby Awards for excellence in electronic media.

== Personal life ==
Tippett grew up in Shawnee, Oklahoma. She has two children and is divorced.

== Quotations ==
- "Anger is often what pain looks like when it shows itself in public."
- "I can disagree with your opinion, it turns out, but I can't disagree with your experience."

== Works ==
- Speaking of Faith: Why Religion Matters—and How to Talk About It (Penguin, January 29, 2008)
- Einstein's God: Conversations About Science and the Human Spirit (Penguin, February 23, 2010)
- ''On Being (radio program and podcast, formerly Speaking of Faith)
- Becoming Wise: An Inquiry into the Mystery and Art of Living (Penguin, April 5, 2016)

== See also ==
- Religion and spirituality podcast
