= Olly Mann =

British television presenter and podcaster

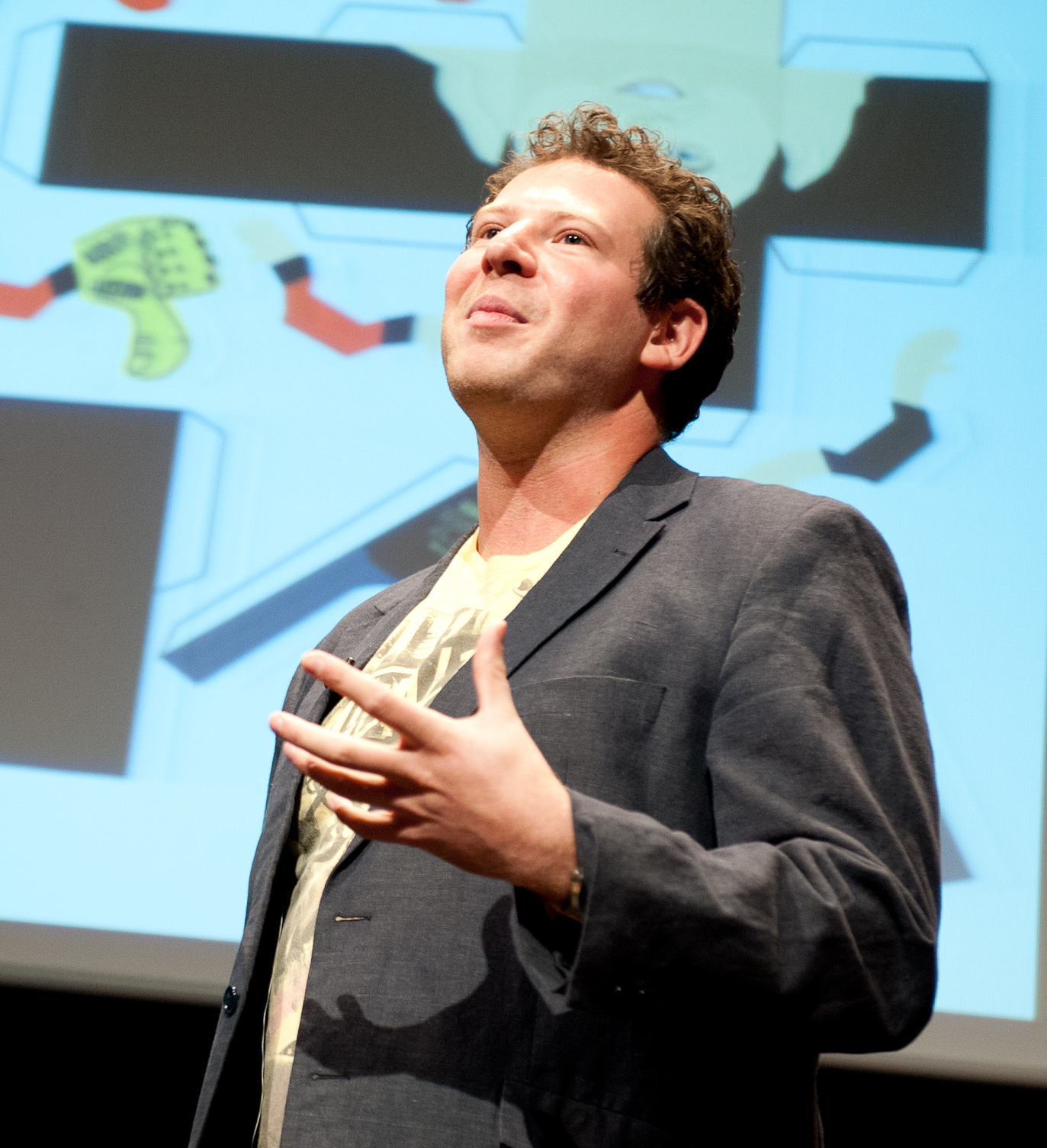
- Mann in 2023
- Born: Hendon, North London, England
- Citizenship: U.K
- Education: St Christopher School, Letchworth
- Alma mater: St Catherine's College, Oxford
- Occupations: Podcaster; Radio personality; Columnist
- Years active: 2006 to present
- Known for: LBC; BBC Radio 5 Live; British Forces Broadcasting Service; Reader's Digest
- Notable work: Answer Me This!; The Modern Mann; The Week Unwrapped; The Male Room; Saturday Live (radio series)
- Television: Lorraine; BBC Breakfast Reporter
- Awards: British Podcast Awards – Best Interview – 2019
- Website: ollymann.com

Olly Mann is a British podcaster, broadcaster and BBC presenter. He is best known as the presenter of the weekend evening show on LBC and for his work with longtime collaborator Helen Zaltzman with whom he presents the award-winning podcast Answer Me This!.

Olly Mann began podcasting before it became a popular form of entertainment and is one of the medium's veterans.

== Education ==
Mann was educated at St Christopher School, an independent school in the town of Letchworth Garden City in Hertfordshire, followed by St Catherine's College at the University of Oxford, where he first met Zaltzman.

== Life and career ==
In 2009, Zaltzman and Mann became the UK's first podcasters to be given their own radio show, "Web 2009 with Helen and Olly", an irreverent look back at the year's online trends, on BBC Radio 5 Live. This was followed by other specials for the network, including "Web 2010 with Helen and Olly", in which they interviewed Trinny Woodall and Jon Ronson; and, in 2012, "Helen and Olly's Required Listening", a look at the world of alternative broadcasting. In 2010, 5 Live gave Zaltzman and Mann their own regular slot, as the "internet experts" on Saturday night news magazine programme Saturday Edition. After the show had been running for two years, the slot was made available to download as part of the BBC's weekly Let's Talk About Tech podcast.

In 2012, Mann became a regular stand-in presenter on London talk station LBC 97.3, where he has interviewed comedians Rufus Hound and Charlie Higson and hosted the overnight slot for ten nights over the festive period. In December 2013, he was announced as the new presenter of the overnight slot for 2014.

In 2017, he became a regular presenter on BBC Radio 4, hosting nine series of the lecture programme, Four Thought.

Mann began co-hosting Saturday Live (radio series) with Nikki Bedi in September 2023.

=== Answer Me This! ===
Answer Me This! is a discussion-based podcast launched in 2007 with co-host Helen Zaltzman. It is one of the long-standing podcasts in the medium. The program answers listener-submitted questions that range from intricate to practical to esoteric. Examples of listener queries include topics like the annual count of meatballs served at IKEA and the speed capacity of the Popemobile. Initially, the pair recorded each episode from Zaltzman's sitting room in Crystal Palace, London.

The show increased its audience following a number of publicity stunts in Luxembourg, which they had identified as "the world's smallest country with its own iTunes site", and where they became the fourth highest-ranked podcast in the country. In 2009 was nominated for Best Internet Programme at the Sony Radio Academy Awards; an award it went on to win in 2010 (Silver) and 2011 (Gold). It was selected as one of the Top 10 Comedy Podcasts in the World by The Guardian, and as Critic's Choice in Radio Times, Metro, and The Observer.

In 2010, Zaltzman and Mann wrote a book of the show, published by Faber and Faber, and were commissioned by VisitBritain to make an online video series, Helen and Olly's Great British Question.

After achieving significant acclaim and producing 400 episodes spanning fifteen years the duo concluded the series in 2021, before returning for a new set of episodes in 2025.

=== The Modern Mann ===
Mann hosts the monthly podcast The Modern Mann with co-hosts Alix Fox, and Ollie Peart. The podcast is aimed at all audiences and covers contemporary culture in a magazine format. Its presenters sought a balance between humour and inquisitiveness for their target demographic. Mann remarked that in the mid-2000s, mainstream media lacked younger figures who could blend geekiness with humour. Alongside co-host Ollie Peart, the duo humorously discusses current trends, like the emergence of "anti-tech tech" and the popularity of inspirational quote posters to more serious topics. For example, in series three, Mann interviewed Adam Deen, a former member of the banned British extremist group Al-Muhajiroun. Deen candidly discusses his radicalisation journey and subsequent shift to campaign against such ideologies. Critics describe Mann's interviewing style as both probing and empathetic. Later, Mann stated that the show embodied the essence of public service broadcasting, presenting challenging content within an entertaining package.

The show has been nominated Podcast of the Year twice at the UK Radio Academy Awards, winning Silver in 2016.

In one notable episode from 2018 interviewed Martha Adam, a rape survivor who reached out to share her story, detailing her rape experience from nearly a decade ago and its subsequent events.

Throughout the interview, Mann exhibited empathy and sensitivity, focusing on letting Adam recount her ordeal without sensationalism. Adam vividly described various moments post the incident, from a forensic expert investigating her bedroom to the rigorous cross-examination she faced in court. Despite the harrowing nature of her testimony, Adam's retelling was neither despairing nor defeatist. She was resilient, emphasising her journey to reclaim control over her life and the incident's aftermath. The episode underscored the importance of understanding and supporting survivors of such traumatic experiences. The episode won Gold in the Best Interview category at the British Podcast Awards.

=== The Week Unwrapped ===
Mann also hosts The Week Unwrapped, a podcast from the British magazine The Week. Instead of focusing on major stories, the show highlights overlooked current affairs. Topics include South Africa's unsuccessful attempt to host the 2022 Commonwealth Games and the Protect and Survive pamphlet that advised the public on what to do during a nuclear attack and subsequently republished by the Imperial War Museum. The podcast is recognised for its concise format and unique insights beyond mainstream headlines.

=== The Male Room ===
The Male Room was seen as BBC Radio 4's Late Night Woman's Hour's male counterpart. The show debuted fourteen months before events like the Harvey Weinstein sexual abuse cases, the MeToo movement and the BBC gender-pay-gap controversy entered the public consciousness. It was aimed at both older and younger listeners, and its topics range from online dating to workplace dynamics and identity politics. Mann also highlighted a disparity in societal acceptance of discussing male vs. female sex toys in media. The terminology used in the show is chosen for its accessibility, avoiding jargon like "patriarchy" or the overuse of "toxic masculinity." The series aims to provide an inclusive discussion platform for male experiences and perspectives.

=== Guest appearances ===
As a newspaper reviewer, Mann has appeared on BBC Breakfast, Lorraine, Sky News and the BBC News Channel.

== Gadgets and technology ==
Mann was the gadgets correspondent for British Forces News on BFBS and reported on technology for Radio 2 daytime show Steve Wright in the Afternoon, including annual coverage of the Consumer Electronics Show in Las Vegas. He was also the gadget columnist for Reader's Digest and has reported on gadgets and technology for outlets including This Morning, Sky News, CNET Olly Mann SoundCloud channel

=== Gadget collection ===
As a former technology writer, Mann receives numerous complimentary gadgets due to his professional involvement. His collection includes an array of smartphones, one of which he dedicates solely to reading recipes. Additionally, he owns a games console primarily used as a DVD player and a smartpen that uses as a regular biro.

Despite the vastness of his collection, Mann has observed that many of the items sent to him could be better in quality. Examples include tablets that malfunction soon after activation and in-car headsets that require extended software update periods upon battery replacement. Mann notes that while technology continually evolves, much of what he receives is merely satisfactory. He often writes about and uses these gadgets that exist more for their novelty than utility.
