= Beach too Sandy, Water too Wet =

Comedy podcast

Beach too Sandy, Water too Wet is a comedy podcast hosted by siblings Alexander “Xandy” and Christine Schiefer. The podcast, featuring dramatic readings of one-star reviews of hyper local and national topics, launched in autumn 2018 and in January 2022 had more than 100,000 listeners. Updated weekly, the hosts challenge one another on specific topics and themes.

It was named among the best new podcasts of 2019 by Spotify, the top ten comedy podcasts in 2021 by UrbanMatter, and the New York Times named it among the six to make the listeners feel good in 2022.

Christine is also the host of And That's Why We Drink and Alex co-hosts Human Seeking Human with Liz Collins.
