= Judaism Unbound =

Jewish podcast

- Genre: Religion and spirituality podcast
- Language: English

Cast and voices
- Hosted by: Dan Libenson; Lex Rofeberg

Publication
- No. of seasons: 1
- No. of episodes: 491 + Bonus Episodes
- Original release: February 25, 2016
- Provider: Institute for the Next Jewish Future
- Updates: Weekly

Related
- Website: www.judaismunbound.com

Judaism Unbound is a podcast and digital education platform hosted by Lex Rofeberg and Rena Yehuda Newman that discusses Judaism in the 21st century, primarily in America. The podcast was hosted by Dan Libenson and Lex Rofeberg from March 2016 to March 2026.

== Overview ==
Judaism Unbound was founded by Dan Libenson in 2015, and would develop from a podcast into a digitally-based centre for Jewish education and experimentation. Libenson began to do research for a book and after Rofeberg joined him as an assistant they decided to turn it into a podcast. Libenson and Rofeberg analyze Judaism in the context of the 21st century while interviewing experts and regular Jewish people. Libenson claims that the traditional methods of engaging people with Judaism alienates American Jews and that digital mediums such as podcasts and online teaching can be used to address that problem. Libenson is the founder and president of the Institute for the Next Jewish Future, which is the provider of the podcast. Libenson is the son of Eli Libenson, a Conservative rabbi, who left Manetto Hill Jewish Center and made aliyah when Dan was 14 years old. Rofeberg grew up in Shorewood, Wisconsin, attended Brown University, and was ordained as a rabbi by the Alliance for Jewish Renewal.

=== Format ===
The podcast releases episodes on a weekly basis. The show's format was originally based on tech podcasts like This Week In Tech and Future Tense and focused on interviewing well known Jewish leaders such as Benay Lappe, Noam Sienna, and Lori Schneide Shapiro.

=== Reception ===
In April 2019, the podcast had over 200 episodes and one million downloads. The show was the seventh most popular Jewish podcast on iTunes with episodes receiving between 40,000 and 50,000 downloads every month. The show hosted a live, online episode to celebrate.

The hosts did interviews with the New Voices and The Jewish Chronicle.
