= KZSC =

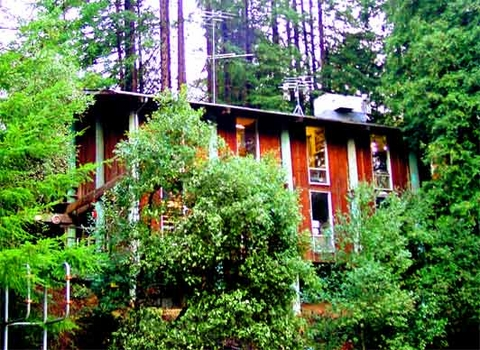
- External view of the KZSC building
- Santa Cruz, California; United States
- Broadcast area: Monterey Bay & Silicon Valley
- Frequency: 88.1 MHz

Programming
- Format: Variety

Ownership
- Owner: The Regents of the University of California

History
- First air date: 1967
- Former call signs: KRUZ (1967–1974)

Technical information
- Licensing authority: FCC
- Facility ID: 66310
- Class: B
- ERP: 20,000 watts
- HAAT: 140.3 meters (460 ft)
- Transmitter coordinates: 37°00′9.8″N 122°03′8.8″W

Links
- Public license information: Public file; LMS
- Webcast: Listen live
- Website: kzsc.org

KZSC (88.1 FM) is a college radio station broadcasting from the campus of the University of California, Santa Cruz in Santa Cruz, California. It is a student-run, community, non-commercial college radio station that serves as a training ground for UC Santa Cruz students interested in broadcasting, media promotions, music, and journalism, as well as an outlet for many members of the Santa Cruz community.

== Programming ==
According to the KZSC Mission Statement, the station is dedicated to "airing alternative viewpoints that often differ from the broadcasts found on many commercial stations". As such, the station has over 60 different shows that vary widely in genre, including sports, reggae, indie, folk, electronica, hip-hop, and a wide variety of international music, as well as a number of talk radio and public affairs programs. Approximately 70% of those shows are helmed by UC Santa Cruz students, along with evening KPFA news broadcasts. It is also largely student-run in administrative matters. With a large following in the Santa Cruz and surrounding counties, KZSC also has a good name and solid following amongst online listeners globally. The station has an iPhone app as well as online streaming from the official website and other online radio streaming sites, such as Tunein. The college radio station is an important part of the UC Santa Cruz campus and broader Santa Cruz community for new and local music, news and talk programming, and news and emergency updates. Though it is under the university jurisdiction, it is not funded by the university, being largely independent and listener sponsored.

Among KZSC alumni who've made their mark in media are the founder of Santa Cruz's loud-rock promoter Bane Shows; This American Life alum Stephanie Foo; producer Julie Snyder—co-creator of Serial and now at The New York Times; and Comedy Central writer Jesse Thorn.

== History ==
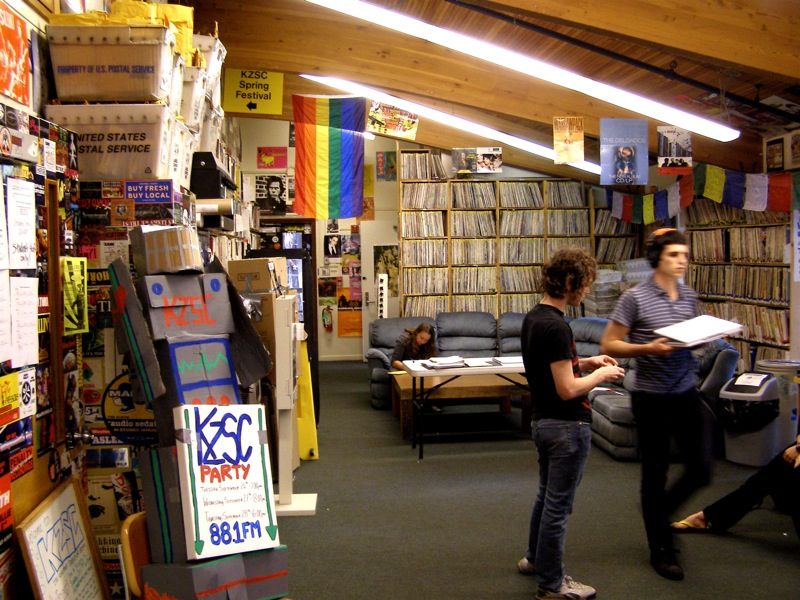
KZSC lounge

The station was founded in 1967 as KRUZ, broadcasting a very low-power signal from the basement of the Stevenson College dorms. In 1974, the station officially changed its callsign to KZSC and began to broadcast at 10 watts. In 1980, the station moved to its current "cabin" facilities above Crown College and the signal's power was raised to 1,250 watts. In 2002, KZSC upgraded its signal to 10,000 watts to broadcast to listeners throughout Santa Cruz, San Benito, and Monterey counties. In 2007, KZSC again raised its signal power, doubling their strength to 20,000 watts and extending its reach to the Santa Cruz, San Benito, and Monterey counties.

== Awards ==
KZSC has been chosen by the readers of Metro Santa Cruz as Santa Cruz's #1 radio station for 6 consecutive years as of 2007. Since 2003, KZSC has been the only West Coast entry on the Princeton Review's list of top 20 campus stations. In 2010, The Huffington Post named KZSC as one of the top nine college radio stations. The station has also won Best Radio Station in local publication Good Times's Arts & Culture awards numerous times. In 2022, KZSC was voted Family Favorite Radio Station by the Growing Up in Santa Cruz organization.

== See also ==
- Campus radio
- List of college radio stations in the United States
