= Good Muslim, Bad Muslim =

Comedy podcast

- Genre: Comedy and humor; Pop culture; Religion and spirituality; Political podcast
- Language: English

Cast and voices
- Hosted by: Tanzila "Taz" Ahmed; Zahra Noorbakhsh

Production
- Length: 45-60 Minutes

Publication
- No. of seasons: 1
- No. of episodes: 61
- Provider: AudioBoom
- Updates: Monthly

Related
- Website: audioboom.com/channel/goodmuslimbadmuslim/

Good Muslim, Bad Muslim (stylized #GoodMuslimBadMuslim) is a comedy podcast hosted by two Muslim women about being a Muslim woman in America.

== Background ==
Zahra Noorbakhsh and Tanzila Ahmed met on a book tour for Love, InshAllah. They started a running joke on Twitter that eventually led to the creation of the podcast. The hosts are creating the podcast in hopes that it creates a positive change in Muslim communities, and addresses Islamophobia in America. Topics explored by the podcast are broad in subject matter. The hosts discuss how they are viewed as "bad" by Muslim communities for not being religious enough, but they are viewed as "good" by non-Muslims for being less religious.

Zahra Noorbakhsh comes from a Persian-American family that moved to the states in the 1980s.
