= Jesse Thorn =

American radio personality (born 1981)

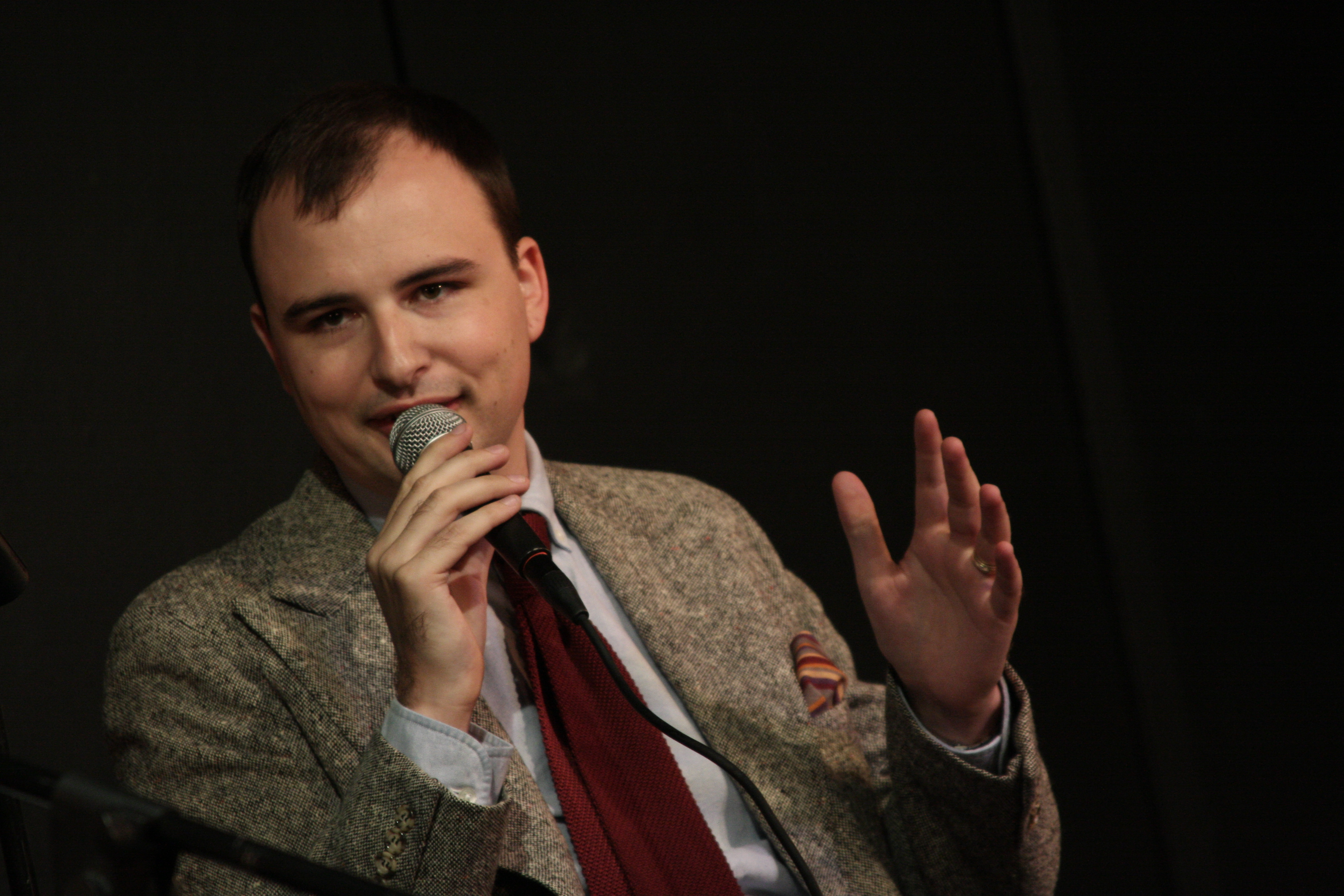
- September 2009
- Born: April 24, 1981 (age 45); San Francisco, California, U.S.
- Spouse: Theresa Hossfeld (m. 2008)
- Children: 3
- Presenting career
- Show: Bullseye with Jesse Thorn
- Station: Maximum Fun
- Network: National Public Radio; Public Radio International (former)
- Style: Interview
- Country: United States
- Website: www.maximumfun.org

Jesse Michael Gabriel Thorn (born April 24, 1981) is an American media entrepreneur and public radio and podcast host/creator. He is the founder of the Maximum Fun podcast network, and the host and producer of the podcasts Judge John Hodgman and Jordan, Jesse, Go! and the radio show and podcast Bullseye. Bullseye (formerly The Sound of Young America), is distributed by National Public Radio to several hundred public terrestrial radio stations. In 2024, Thorn was elected to the Podcasting Hall of Fame.

In addition to his work in radio and podcasts, Jesse Thorn also hosted the television program The Grid, which formerly aired on IFC, and The Sound of Young America, which aired on Current, and runs a blog and web video series devoted to men's fashion called Put This On. As an actor, he has appeared on stage with the sketch comedy group Prank the Dean, on FX’s Archer and on IFC's Comedy Bang Bang.

== Early life ==
Thorn grew up in San Francisco, where he attended Discovery Center School, The Nueva School and Ruth Asawa San Francisco School of the Arts. He graduated from the University of California, Santa Cruz, where he co-founded The Sound of Young America and worked as news director of the campus radio station KZSC. The Sound of Young America began as a college radio variety show featuring Thorn and two other co-hosts, Jordan Morris and Gene O'Neill.

== Career ==
Near the end of 2004, Thorn began to make his show, The Sound of Young America, available as a podcast. A few months later, Thorn received a call from the director of programming at PRI, who had heard one of the podcasts and expressed interest in distributing the show. In 2006 WNYC-FM, a public radio station in New York City, picked up the show, and PRI decided to distribute it. By September 2008 the show was carried on 18 public radio stations, in addition to the podcast. This was the beginning of Maximum Fun, which Thorn owned until 2023, when it became a worker-owned co-op.

Thorn and the show were mentioned in The Wall Street Journal, Time Magazine and Salon.com, with Salon describing Thorn's interviewing style as combining "the civility and preparedness of [Terry] Gross leavened with the good humor of [Conan] O'Brien." Thorn's discussion of the concept of "New Sincerity" was noted in a 2007 USA Weekend feature and a 2008 scholarly article.

In 2006, Thorn and former Sound of Young America co-host Jordan Morris launched another podcast, Jordan, Jesse, Go! Thorn has also produced several other podcasts for MaximumFun.org, including Elizabeth Gilbert's Magic Lessons, the scripted comedy series Bubble, Coyle & Sharpe: The Imposters and The Kasper Hauser Comedy Podcast. He was also a part of sketch comedy group Prank the Dean, along with Morris, Lauren Pasternak and Jim Real.

Over time, The Sound of Young America (now Bullseye), which had featured a variety of segments, became more focused on interviews. Thorn has interviewed many notable personalities on his show, including Dolly Parton, Greta Gerwig, Jay Leno, Antonio Banderas, Jeff Goldblum and E-40. Thorn also interviewed Stephen Colbert as a part of iTunes's Meet the Author series.

Thorn has been an important leader in the podcast business. Fast Company called him "the most important person in entertainment you've never heard of" and "the Zelig of modern culture." In 2011, the magazine chose him as one of the 100 most creative people in business. In 2009, Jesse helped comedian and podcaster Marc Maron to set up the microphones and software necessary to produce his WTF with Marc Maron podcast from his garage. Maron thanked Jesse again for this on the podcast's 300th episode. Jesse is also the co-producer of the public radio broadcast version of Maron's podcast.

In 2012, The Sound of Young America was renamed Bullseye and now exclusively features interviews.

In 2017 and 2018, Thorn released a podcast series on the art of interviewing, entitled The Turnaround. It featured interviews with interviewers on interviewing, including guests such as Dick Cavett, Katie Couric, Werner Herzog, Larry King and Terry Gross.

== Personal life ==
In 2008, Thorn married Theresa Hossfeld. They have three children.

From 2013 until the pandemic finally prompted her to step down in spring of 2022, Theresa Thorn co-hosted the Maximum Fun podcast One Bad Mother with Biz Ellis.
