= Jordan, Jesse, Go! =

- Genre: Comedy, talk
- Language: English

Cast and voices
- Hosted by: Jordan Morris and Jesse Thorn

Music
- Theme music composed by: "Love You" by The Free Design

Production
- Production: Christian Dueñas(current); Brian Fernandes (emeritus)
- Length: 60–120 minutes

Publication
- No. of episodes: 950 (as of January 19, 2026)
- Original release: 2006
- Provider: Maximum Fun

Related
- Website: Official JJGO website

Jordan, Jesse, Go! (often abbreviated to JJGO) is a weekly comedy audio podcast, which began airing in 2007. It is hosted by comedian Jordan Morris, a television writer, producer, and actor, and Jesse Thorn, a public radio host. The show is part of Maximum Fun, a podcast network founded by Thorn.

The format of the show is typically a conversation between Thorn, Morris, and a guest on the show.

Fans of the podcast are known as "Tuppies," a colloquialism for Tupperware.

== History ==
Thorn and Morris met as students at the University of California, Santa Cruz, where they co-hosted the original version of The Sound of Young America. Morris and Thorn created Jordan, Jesse, Go!, initially called The Untitled Thorn/Morris Project, when they both moved out to Los Angeles. They began the show because they missed doing The Sound of Young America together and wanted to work together on comedy again.

== Format ==
Jordan, Jesse, Go! is a generally free-form comedy show lasting for about 90 minutes. Each episode begins with the theme song, "Love You", by The Free Design, followed by an unstructured discussion between Thorn, Morris and, usually, a guest. The guests mostly come from the world of alternative comedy, though occasionally the guests come from the broader entertainment world.

=== Recurring segments ===
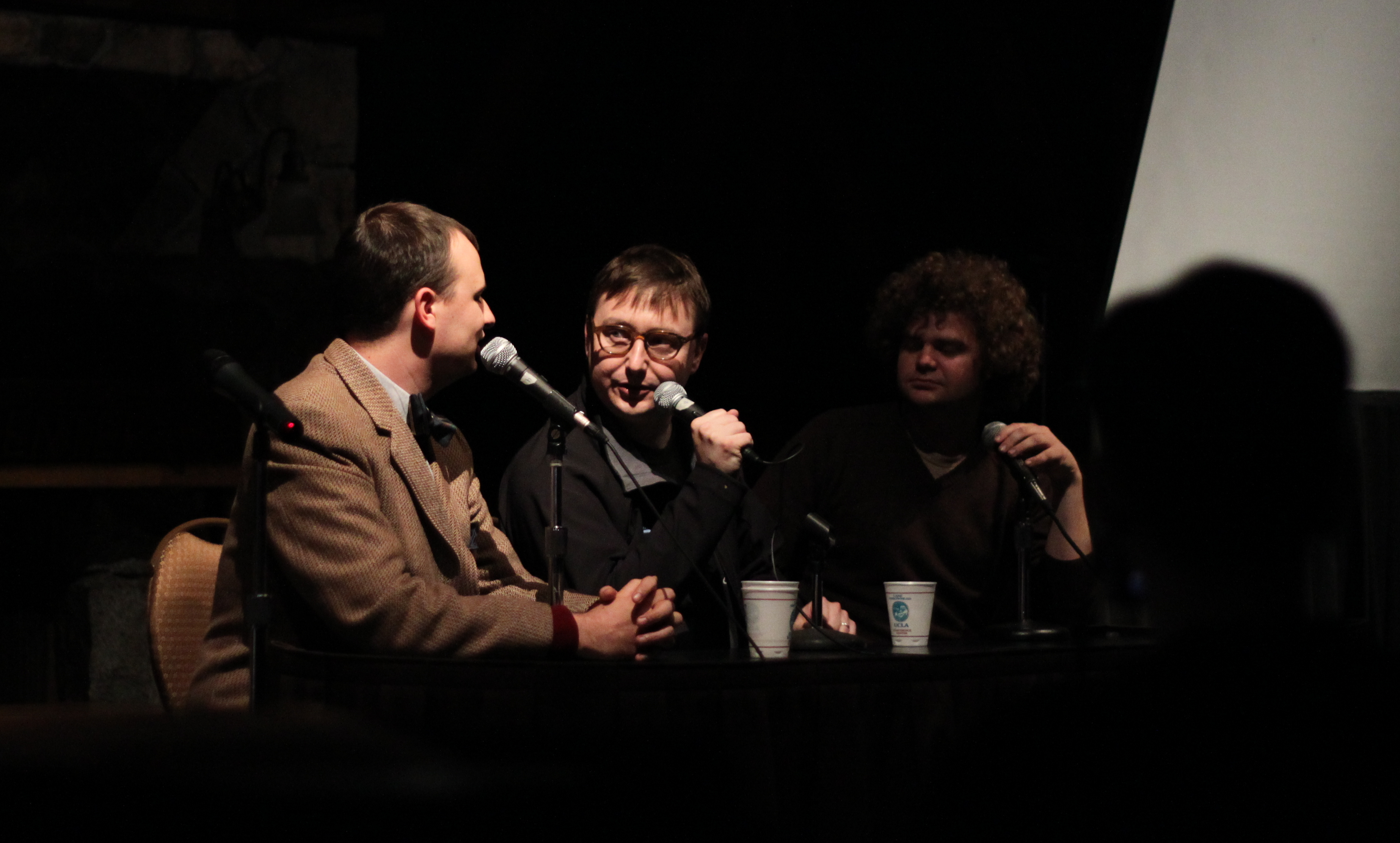
Jesse, John Hodgman, and Jordan (l-r) during a live taping at MaxFunCon 2009

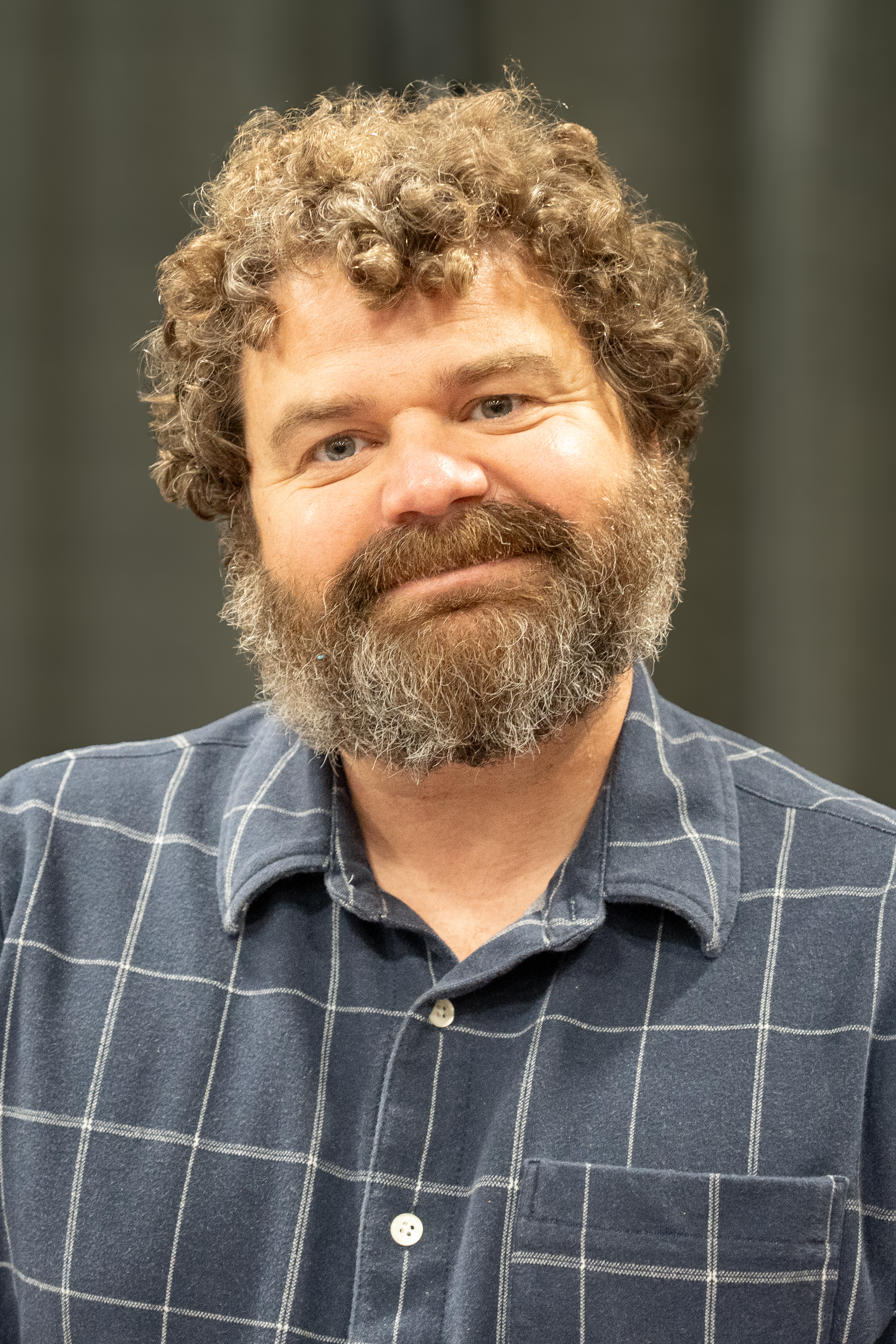
Jordan at Comic Con Oakland 2026

==== Momentous Occasions ====
In this segment, a selection of listener telephone calls left on the show's answering machine are played back, with the hosts and guests commenting on each call after it is played. While the content of the calls played varies, they are generally roughly divided into "momentous occasions", wherein the caller relates something interesting which has happened to or around them, or "moments of shame", wherein the caller recounts an event in which they acted foolishly or otherwise embarrassed themselves.

==== Judge John Hodgman ====
In early episodes of the show, humorist and author John Hodgman would adjudicate disputes, generally between listeners, with Jesse serving as "bailiff" and Jordan and the guest serving as "legal counsel" for the two sides. In 2010, this segment was spun off into its own podcast, Judge John Hodgman.

==== The Calliseum ====
In this segment Jordan and Jesse (and sometimes their guest) attempt to predict the number of their listeners who have a certain characteristic or experience in common. Predicted audience groupings included, people who have been on a submarine, contestants on Jeopardy!, and people who own a fez. This segment has been retired.

==== 'Walton Goggins Has A Vodka' ====
Listeners are asked to send in their recordings of original or parody songs based around the theme of American actor Walton Goggins’ relationship with spirits company Mulholland Distilling. The original parody song (by Morris) are the lyrics “Walton Goggins has a vodka” sung to the melody of the 1987 animated television series Teenage Mutant Ninja Turtles theme song.

== Reception ==
In an in-depth review in 2010, Splitsider concluded that JJGO was "a funny and subscription-worthy podcast that the new guys could all learn a lot from", and LA Weekly included the show in a "comedy podcast flow-chart," describing listening to Jordan, Jesse, Go! as "feeling like [you're] at a party with hilarious comics doing bits all night".

A review in The Guardian suggested that while the guest interviews could be "revealing", the show was too lengthy and the opening segment was "nonsense".
