= Religion and spirituality podcast =

A religion and spirituality podcast also known as a Godcast, iGod, Cyber Sermon, or Pod Preacher is a genre of podcast that covers topics related to religious and spiritual beliefs and is often done as a sermon, prayer, or reading of a religious text. The genre encompasses all religions and spiritual beliefs, but the most common religion and spirituality podcast topic is Christianity. The genre was influenced by televangelism and early examples of religion and spirituality podcasts included radio shows by televangelists that had been released in a podcast format.

== History ==
The Vatican began radio broadcasts in 1931 and by 2005 was offering many of those programs as podcasts. Pope Benedict XVI hosted his own podcast in 2005.

In the United States of America, "Godcast" is a registered trademark of Craig Patchett, founder of The Godcast Network. Patchett's Godcast Network provides a platform for a number of podcasts including his daughter's show "Rachel's Choice."

Religion and spirituality podcasts are used as an alternative for attending live sermons or church services and are more easily accessible for people with busy schedules. Podcasting makes it easier for a pastor to connect with their congregation than having an individual conversations with each parishioner. They are also used for evangelizing and proselytizing to larger audiences through an alternative medium that can be easily accessed from around the world—leading to pastors having listenership from every continent and numerous countries other than their own. Tania Ralli of The New York Times compared the beginnings of Christian podcasting to the Christian movement that embraced radio and television—now known as Televangelism. Between early July and late August 2005, religion and spirituality podcasts on Podcast Alley increased from 171 to 474. Reverend Mark Batterson, the host of National Community Church Audio Podcast, compared the impact of podcasting on the church to that of the printing press on the distribution of Bibles. Religion and spirituality podcasting has the same roots in blogs and radio shows that other genres of podcasts have. According to Tania Ralli of The New York Times, Christian podcasts make up the majority of religious and spirituality podcasts available. Reverend Roderick Vonhögen commented on the medium saying that "Podcasting for us has been a resurrection of radio," and "It's the connection to a new generation." Many religion and spirituality podcasts contain daily devotional readings, sermons, daily prayers, and Christian music.

According to Ellen Lee of the Fort Wayne News-Sentinel, "the vast majority [of religion and spirituality podcasts] are Christian-based, but they also include New Age, Jewish and Buddhist podcasts." Charles Arthur of the New Statesman has commented on the trend and its funding methods to the TV evangelist Billy Graham, who would boldly ask for donations. The Daily Telegraph pointed out that churches typically have difficulty embracing pop culture and that podcasting has been one of a few success stories, and that even the non-religious can be enthusiastic about the development because over-zealous evangelists will be reduced to silently using earbuds and headphones.

According to Olga Kharif of the Bloomberg Businessweek, "Religion and spirituality podcasts have multiplied faster than most other types of podcast programming and have emerged as one of the genre's most popular." In May 2005, Vonhögen's "Catholic Insider" podcast ranked third on PodcastAlley.com, which hosted 2,884 podcasts at the time. Ryan King and Dan Tripp began a podcast called "Outchurched" as an alternative to ministry work. In 2005, most religious organizations did not have official positions on podcasts, but encouraged spreading the Gospel message regardless of the medium being used. Most religion and spirituality podcasts are made by preachers who want to spread the Gospel to more than just their congregation. Reverend Tim Hohm hosts the podcast "RevTim", which reached an international audience in 2005 despite his relatively small congregation. Reverend John Butler—who worked previously as a radio host and DJ—hosts the "Psalmcast", which contained over 5,000 psalms in 2005.

The "Catholic Insider" and "The Daily Breakfast" delves into pop culture such as Star Wars and Harry Potter to discuss the religious or spiritual messages and themes present in the stories.

Religion and spirituality podcasting has started in countries around the world including the United States, the Netherlands, and India.

== Notable examples ==
Notable figures in the religion and spirituality podcast movement include Craig Patchett host of The Godcast, Reverend Tim Hohm host of the podcast RevTim, Reverend Mark Batterson host of National Community Church Audio Podcast, James Dobson host of Focus on the Family Broadcast and Dr. James Dobson's Family Talk, Al Mohler host of The Briefing and Thinking in Public, Reverend Roderick Vonhögen host of Catholic Insider and The Daily Breakfast. The Boston Worship Center hosts the "Worship Center Audio Podcast".

== See also ==
- List of religion and spirituality podcasts
- Rob Bell
- Roderick Vonhögen
- Krista Tippett
- New Evangelisation – Catholic Church's modernization of its approach to preaching the Gospel
