= The Areas of My Expertise =

2005 satirical almanac by John Hodgman

- Author: John Hodgman
- Language: English
- Publisher: Dutton Adult
- Publication date: October 20, 2005
- Publication place: United States
- Media type: Print (Hardcover) & Audiobook (CD)
- Pages: 240
- ISBN: 0-525-94908-9
- OCLC: 58043280
- Dewey Decimal: 818.607
- LC Class: PN6165 .H64 2005
- Followed by: More Information Than You Require

The Areas of My Expertise is a 2005 American satirical almanac by John Hodgman. It is written in the form of absurd historical stories, complex charts and graphs, and fake newspaper columns. Among its sections are a list of 700 different hobo names and complete descriptions of "all 51" US states. The full title of the book is:

An Almanac of Complete World Knowledge Compiled with Instructive Annotation and Arranged in Useful Order by myself, John Hodgman, a Professional Writer, in The Areas of My Expertise, which Include: Matters Historical, Matters Literary, Matters Cryptozoological, Hobo Matters, Food, Drink & Cheese (a Kind of Food), Squirrels & Lobsters & Eels, Haircuts, Utopia, What Will Happen in the Future, and Most Other Subjects

The book was later released in audiobook form, narrated by Hodgman himself with some musical accompaniment by frequent collaborator Jonathan Coulton and a guest appearance by Paul Rudd.

The interior and exterior of the book are designed by graphic artist Sam Potts who is known for the interior and exterior design of the Brooklyn Superhero Supply Co. and The Writer's Block.

A sequel, More Information Than You Require, was released on October 21, 2008, and the final book of the trilogy, That Is All, in 2011.

== The 700 Hoboes Project and e-Hobo.com ==
The 700 Hoboes Project refers to an internet meme that originated with a recording of Hodgman's recitation of the 700 hobo names from The Areas of My Expertise. An audio file of the reading, accompanied by frequent collaborator Jonathan Coulton playing "Big Rock Candy Mountain" "live for an hour, one take", was posted to a page on the promotional website for the book.

In October 2005, on hearing the audio file, Mark Frauenfelder proposed on the BoingBoing website to have "700 cartoonists volunteer to draw one of the 700 hoboes" that Hodgman listed in the book.

A few days later, the first of the 700 hoboes ("Stewbuilder Dennis") was posted to Flickr by Daniel Cardenas and a Flickr group (700 Hoboes) was subsequently formed.

In March 2006, several contributors to the 700 Hoboes Project decided to build a portal to house the drawings posted to the Flickr group. Len Peralta of Jawbone Radio came up with a design for the site and passed it on to Dan Coulter, who built a back end system using phpFlickr, his open source wrapper for Flickr's API. Hobo illustrators Adam Koford, Mike Peterson, Ben Rollman and Eric Vespoor contributed to the creation of the website, www.e-hobo.com. The URL refers to hobo #450 in the list, "my-e-hobo.com".

The 700 names were completed on September 5, 2006, coinciding with the release date of Areas of My Expertise to paperback, which contains an additional 100 hobo names. As of September 2006, there have been over 200 contributors to the project, spanning the globe. In March 2007, Adam Koford completed illustrating each of the 800 hoboes.

== The Furry Old Lobster ==
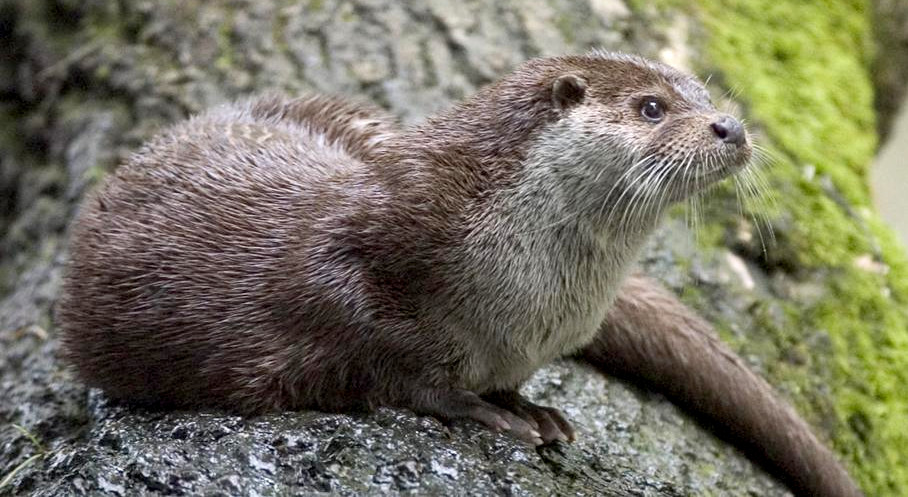
The "furry old lobster" as illustrated in the book

In one section of The Areas of My Expertise, "A Brief Time Line of the Lobster in America," Hodgman explains that lobsters as we know them today were not introduced to Maine until the turn of the century, after Theodore Roosevelt built a secret canal from lobster-ridden New York City to the coast of Maine. Before that time, writes Hodgman, an entirely different animal - particularly "a kind of sea otter" - was known in Maine as the "lobster" (the photo of a European otter at right is included with the caption "Figure 11: The Lobster"). The new lobster threatened the existence of the "Old Lobster," the last of which died in 1980, in the kitchen of a Furry Old Lobster restaurant (which itself is part of a conglomeration owned by [new] lobsters).

While Hodgman's story is entirely fictional, an actual furry lobster, Kiwa hirsuta, was discovered in March 2005 in the South Pacific. Hodgman includes a photo of the newly discovered crustacean in the rear cover of the paperback edition of The Areas of My Expertise, along with the words, "Some readers have taken this as a worrisome portent that certain items in my book of lies may be coming true. BUT BE CALM. If you observe the 'FURRY OLD LOBSTER' described in my book, you will see that [that creature and the newly discovered species] are not the same creature at all, though both are DISGUSTINGLY FURRY." Since then, the book's official website has a page dedicated to the matter, including a photo of the otter-like "lobster" with the caption "Old furry old lobster."

Musician/Hodgman collaborator Jonathan Coulton has written a song called "Furry Old Lobster", telling the tale of the lost species. Coulton has performed the song on Attack of the Show, at many of Hodgman's book signings, and on the audiobook version of The Areas of My Expertise.

== The 51 United States ==
An additional section in Areas of My Expertise, Part Six, "Our 51 United States," contains Hodgman's own descriptions of the states of the United States, including nicknames and mottos. The 51st state, Hodgman says, is called "Hohoq (also known as Ar)" and "frequently moves across the continent by unknown means and seems to disappear altogether." He also says that Hohoq is home to the "Thunderbirds," giant eagles who shoot lightning from their eyes and transform into men. The state is described as having a complicated political history with the federal government, at one point being represented in the Senate by an enormous shape-shifting raven.

== Kingdom of Loathing ==
The internet browser game The Kingdom of Loathing features a playable game area named Hobopolis, which was directly inspired by Hodgman's work. The hobos that appear in Hobopolis (with the exception of the six bosses) are randomly named, although the possibilities borrow heavily from Hodgman's list of hobo names. The final boss, Hodgman the Hoboverlord, is named for John Hodgman himself. The developers of The Kingdom of Loathing were granted personal permission by Hodgman to use his material, as well as his name, for the game. He was reportedly "flattered". Furthermore, a tattoo that can be obtained in-game from Hobopolis is the same as the hobo marking that means "It is time for hoboes to take over the United States government" in Hodgman's book.

== More Information Than You Require ==
More Information Than You Require is part two of The Areas of My Expertise and covers similar subjects. The book continues from the page where The Areas of My Expertise leaves off.
