= John Hodgman: Ragnarok =

American television comedy special

- Genre: Stand-up comedy
- Written by: John Hodgman
- Directed by: Lance Bangs
- Starring: John Hodgman; Scott Adsit; Cynthia Hopkins
- Country of origin: United States
- Original language: English

Production
- Production locations: The Bell House, Brooklyn, New York
- Running time: 67 minutes

Original release
- Network: Netflix
- Release: June 20, 2013

John Hodgman: Ragnarok is an American Netflix original comedy special starring John Hodgman and directed by Lance Bangs. The special features music from Cynthia Hopkins.

== History ==
In 2012, John Hodgman toured the United States promoting his book That Is All as well as performing an apocalypse-themed stand-up comedy routine revolving around his interpretation of Ragnarök, the Norse end of the world.

On midnight of December 21, 2012, Hodgman performed his last Ragnarok show to a full house at The Bell House in Gowanus, Brooklyn.

Netflix aired the special on June 20, 2013.

"My main goal initially was to take this show that I had developed rather accidentally on the road. What had begun as a literally presentation from my book had grown into a true one man stand up comedy show with a beginning, middle and end that I liked a lot. I felt extremely lucky that right away, before anyone even had a chance to express interest, Netflix said they would want to air it, and from my point of view, that was perfect."

— John Hodgman

== Promotion ==
In promotion of his comedy special, Hodgman has appeared on Boing Boing's Gweek, CNET's The 404 Show, The Huffington Post's HuffPost Live, People's Chatter, WBEZ's Morning Shift with Tony Sarabia, WCKG's Mancow's Morning Madhouse, WNBC's Talk Stoop, WFMU's The Best Show on WFMU with Tom Scharpling, WNYC's The Leonard Lopate Show, and You Made It Weird with Pete Holmes.

Hodgman has also buzz-marketed John Hodgman: Ragnarok on his podcast Judge John Hodgman.

== Ragnarok Survival Kit ==
In December 17, 2013, John Hodgman made available a special DVD package (designed by Jessica Hische) limited to 500 that contains an extended cut of John Hodgman: Ragnarok as well as:

- Survival Mayonnaise (designed by Empire Mayonnaise).
- An engraved urine flask.
- Hodgman's "downloaded consciousness" on a USB flash drive.
- Unisex cologne (designed by Drom fragrances).
- Hodgman's mustache clippings.

The extended cut includes scenes featuring Ira Glass, Tom Scharpling, and Andrew Sullivan; and a scene where Hodgman calls Greenfield, Massachusetts "a shit-hole." On December 21, 2013, the newspaper The Recorder published his apology to the town.

== Reception ==
Tuyet Nguyen of The A.V. Club gave it a "B+" calling it "unconventional" citing "Despite this complicated setup, Ragnarok boils down to Hodgman doing what he does best: acting pompous." Marah Eakin of The A.V. Club ranked John Hodgman: Ragnarok first in their list of "best comedy albums and specials of 2013." Mark Frauenfelder of Boing Boing said he "enjoyed very much."

Eric Limer of Gizmodo called John Hodgman: Ragnarok "no Arrested Development Season 4, but awesome little gets like this are what stand to make Netflix a real powerhouse of cool, but slightly offbeat content." IGN's Joey Esposito listed John Hodgman: Ragnarok among "10 Great Netflix Original Stand-Up Comedy Specials" remarking that it is the "epitome of Hodgman’s offbeat character and a nice blend of observational humor and far more out-there laughs." Chris Higgins of Mental floss called John Hodgman: Ragnarok "both smart and funny, and come on -- it's Hodgman." The Oklahoman said they found John Hodgman: Ragnarok "more one-man show (with assists from friends such as Scott Adsit of 30 Rock) than traditional standup," and "fits within the Venn diagram sweet spot between This American Life, McSweeney's and The Daily Show with Jon Stewart." The Oklahoman also notes that having the special on a streaming video service "makes total sense" since John Hodgman "has a specialized appeal and he devotes equal time to both highbrow and lowbrow material, which might make him a hard sell in arenas where subtlety is a rare commodity."

Sam Gutelle of Tubefilter said "had the apocalypse arrived that evening, we would’ve gone out laughing" stating that John Hodgman: Ragnarok "has enough content beyond simple stand-up to make it worth checking out." Aaron Frank of The Village Voice ranked John Hodgman: Ragnarok "#9" in their list of "Top 10 Stand-Up Comedy Specials of 2013." Frank praised that Hodgman's "elegant command of language is particularly unmatched in the comedy world" but critiqued "the theme seems to limit the scope of material presented, and having seen Hodgman a couple times since Ragnarok was taped, I can say with certainty that he has some better jokes up his sleeve for the future."
