= Ferreiraella =

Scientific classification
- Kingdom: Animalia
- Phylum: Mollusca
- Class: Polyplacophora
- Order: Lepidopleurida
- Family: Abyssochitonidae
- Genus: Ferreiraella; Sirenko, 1988

Type species
- Ferreiraella caribbensi Sirenko, 1988

Synonyms
- Abyssochiton Dell'Angelo & Palazzi, 1989; Xylochiton Gowlett-Holmes & A. M. Jones, 1992

Genus of chiton

Ferreiraella is a genus of lepidopleurid chiton that belongs to the family Abyssochitonidae. The family it belongs to contains only this genus making it monotypic.

Members of this genus feed on sunken wood.

== Species ==
This genus currently contains 11 described species and two subspecies of Ferreiraella xylophaga.

- Ferreiraella bartlettae (A. J. Ferreira, 1986)
- Ferreiraella caribbensis Sirenko, 1988
- Ferreiraella charazata Sigwart, 2025
- Ferreiraella plana (Nierstrasz, 1905)
- Ferreiraella populi Sigwart, 2026
- Ferreiraella scrippsiana (A. J. Ferreira, 1980)
- Ferreiraella soyomaruae (S.-K. Wu & Okutani, 1984)
- Ferreiraella takii (S.-K. Wu & Okutani, 1984)
- Ferreiraella tsuchidai H. Saito, 2006
- Ferreiraella xylophaga (Gowlett-Holmes & A. M. Jones, 1992)
