= SPAMasterpiece Theater =

American comedy web series

- Genre: Drama
- Creative director: Jolon Gabriel Bankey
- Presented by: John Hodgman
- Starring: John Hodgman
- Judges: John Hodgman
- Voices of: Dana Devonshire; Russ Gooberman; John Hodgman; Xeni Jardin; Erik Sheppard
- Narrated by: John Hodgman
- Country of origin: United States
- Original language: English
- No. of seasons: 1

Production
- Executive producer: Xeni Jardin
- Producer: Dana Devonshire
- Editors: Derek Bledsoe; Wesly Varghese
- Camera setup: Derek Bledsoe; Wesly Varghese
- Production companies: Happy Mutants, LLC

Original release
- Network: Digital Entertainment Corporation of America
- Release: March 2 – December 10, 2008

SPAMasterpiece Theater (or S.P.A.M. Theater) is an American web series starring humorist John Hodgman where he does dramatic readings of unsolicited email spam received by Boing Boing editors in a parody of Masterpiece Theatre. The series featured images and videos from Creative Commons-licensed media.

== Background ==
=== S.P.A.M. Theater ===
In 2008, S.P.A.M. Theater debuted. Each episode features a dramatization of email spam. Originally, the series featured images and videos from Creative Commons-licensed media from the image hosting and video hosting website Flickr and the nonprofit digital library Internet Archive. The second episode "FOR MY DAUGHTER'S SAKE/DE@L OF A LIFETIME" featured the voices of Russ Gooberman and Dana Devonshire. In the third episode "Love Song of Kseniya," Boing Boing's Xeni Jardin reads her own email spam. In the fourth episode "The Proposition," Erik Sheppard of Voice Talent Productions contributes a voice.

=== SPAMasterpiece Theater ===
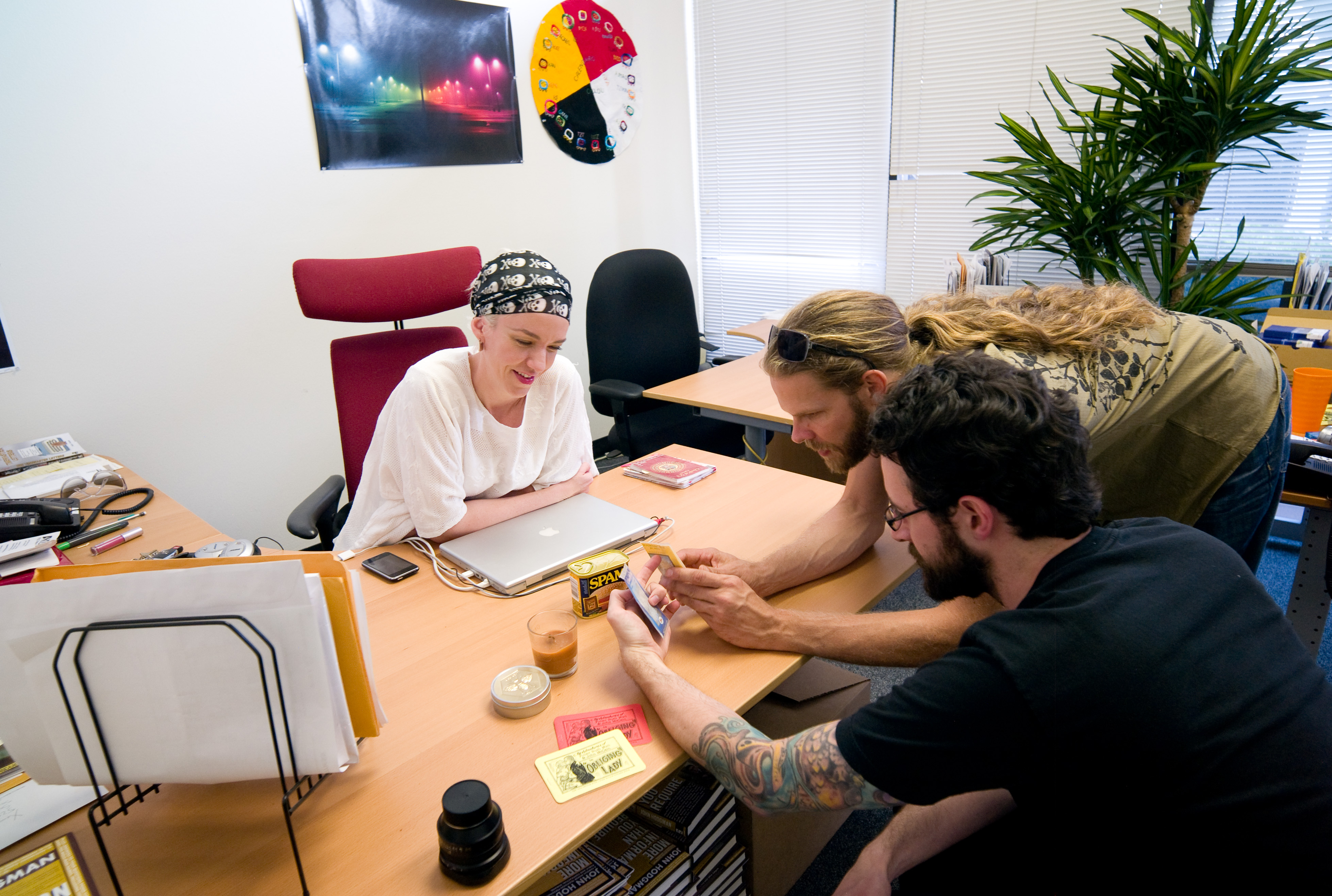
John Behrens and Sean Bonner talk about SPAMasterpiece Theater in Xeni Jardin's BBtv office.

On October 1, 2008, Jardin announced the official debut of the web series SPAMasterpiece Theater—almost a month before the American release of John Hodgman's satirical almanac More Information Than You Require. Hodgman described it as "true tale[s] of romance, adventure, infamy, and low-cost prescription drugs, all culled from the reams of actual, unsolicited emails, received here by us and people like you -- what we call SPAM." The hosted series included dramatic readings by Hodgman in a parody of Masterpiece Theatre. In 2010, Boing Boing Video's Jardin was picked as "Curator of the Month". She commended the series with "These were so much fun to put together."

== Episodes ==
=== S.P.A.M. Theater ===
No.	Title	Directed by	Original release date
1	"Part one, HOWITZER CANNONPANTS; Part two, THANKS, MAURICE"	Erik David Clapp; Brian Luke Chii; Shawn Kelly	March 2, 2008
Boing Boing editor Xeni Jardin described part one as "a spiritual and pharmaceutical parable that ends not with resurrection, but erection[,]" while part two: "one of dozens of emails received by Boing Boing editors from a disturbed man in Canada who sought cash, justice, and an end to 'Mind Controlled Hatred.'"
2	"Part one, FOR MY DAUGHTER'S SAKE; Part two, DE@L OF A LIFETIME"	Unknown	March 7, 2008
Jardin described part one as "If one were pitching this to a movie studio, you might describe the plot as Grapes of Wrath meets Spanish Prisoner meets an ATM," while part two: "a tasty dish of word salad."
3	"Love Song of Kseniya"	Unknown	April 21, 2008
Part one: "[A] classic Romance Scam enticement from the fictional spamtress "Kseniya," written in mad heroine prose worthy of a Tennessee Williams play." Part two: "'80s electrobeats and word salad merge as one."
4	"The Proposition"	Unknown	May 22, 2008
Jardin described it as "a cash proposition from a faraway land, and the secret to what girls want."

=== SPAMasterpiece Theater ===
No.	Title	Directed by	Original release date
1	"John Hodgman in BBtv's SPAMasterpiece Theater (comedy)"	Dana Devonshire	October 1, 2008
John Hodgman himself describes as the dramatization of "true tale[s] of romance, adventure, infamy, and low-cost prescription drugs, all culled from the reams of actual, unsolicited emails, received here by us and people like you -- what we call SPAM."
2	"John Hodgman in BBtv's SPAMasterpiece Theater, Vol II: "Wuthering Wire Transfers.""	Dana Devonshire	October 10, 2008
Jardin described it as "Barrister Abbey and Diana Khan in 'Wuthering Wire Transfers,' a tempting tale of financial transactions and naked lust that requires your soonest response."
3	"John Hodgman in BBtv's SPAMasterpiece Theater, Vol III: THE STOMATOLOGIST."	Dana Devonshire	October 28, 2008
Jardin described it as "The Stomatologist, in which we answer a lovelorn Russian woman's age-old question, 'Why I cannot find my special the man?'"
4	"John Hodgman in BBtv's SPAMasterpiece Theater, Vol IV: V1V4 M3X1CO."	Dana Devonshire	November 4, 2008
Jardin described it as "V1V4 M3X1CO., in which we explore supply chain management solicitations with the help of luchadores, mariachis, beautiful black-n-white seÃ±oritas from the silver screen of our abuelitos, and GIANT NARCO-KITTEHS WITH UZIS."
5	"Unicorn Chaser: John Hodgman Spamasterpiece Theater Bloopers - Boing Boing Video"	Dana Devonshire	December 5, 2008
Jardin described it as "SPAMASTERPIECE THEATER bloopers, out-takes, and oblique lulz from the amazing John Hodgman, minor television personality and author of More Information Than You Require (Amazon link)."

== Music ==
The first four SPAMasterpiece Theater episodes opened with a chiptune remix of Jean-Joseph Mouret's "Rondeau: Fanfare" (1735) by Hamhocks Buttermilk Johnson.

== Reception ==
Vulture's Matthew Perpetua praised the series with "Hodgman's deadpan delivery is typically excellent, but we're particularly fond of the deliberately pretentious juxtaposition of stock footage in the dramatizations. PBS might want to look at this." In a retrospective celebrating the anniversary of Boing Boing TV, BBC Online's web producer Ellen West described SPAMasterpiece Theater as "It's like Adam Curtis doing a nonsense Power of Nightmares."

== See also ==
- List of portmanteaus
