= The Bell House (New York City) =

Performance venue in Brooklyn, New York

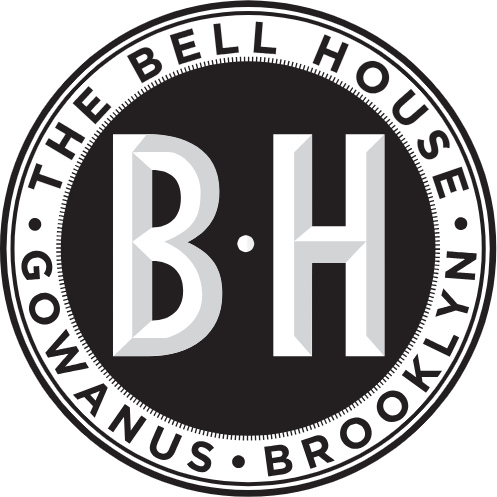
- Interactive map of The Bell House
- Address: 149 7th Street; Brooklyn, New York; United States
- Coordinates: 40°40′25″N 73°59′30″W
- Type: Bar, music/comedy venue

Construction
- Opened: September 2008; 18 years ago

Website
- www.thebellhouseny.com

The Bell House is a bar and music/comedy venue in Brooklyn, New York. In September 2008 it was opened for the first time. It was the usual recording venue for the NPR program Ask Me Another during that program's run.

== Shows ==
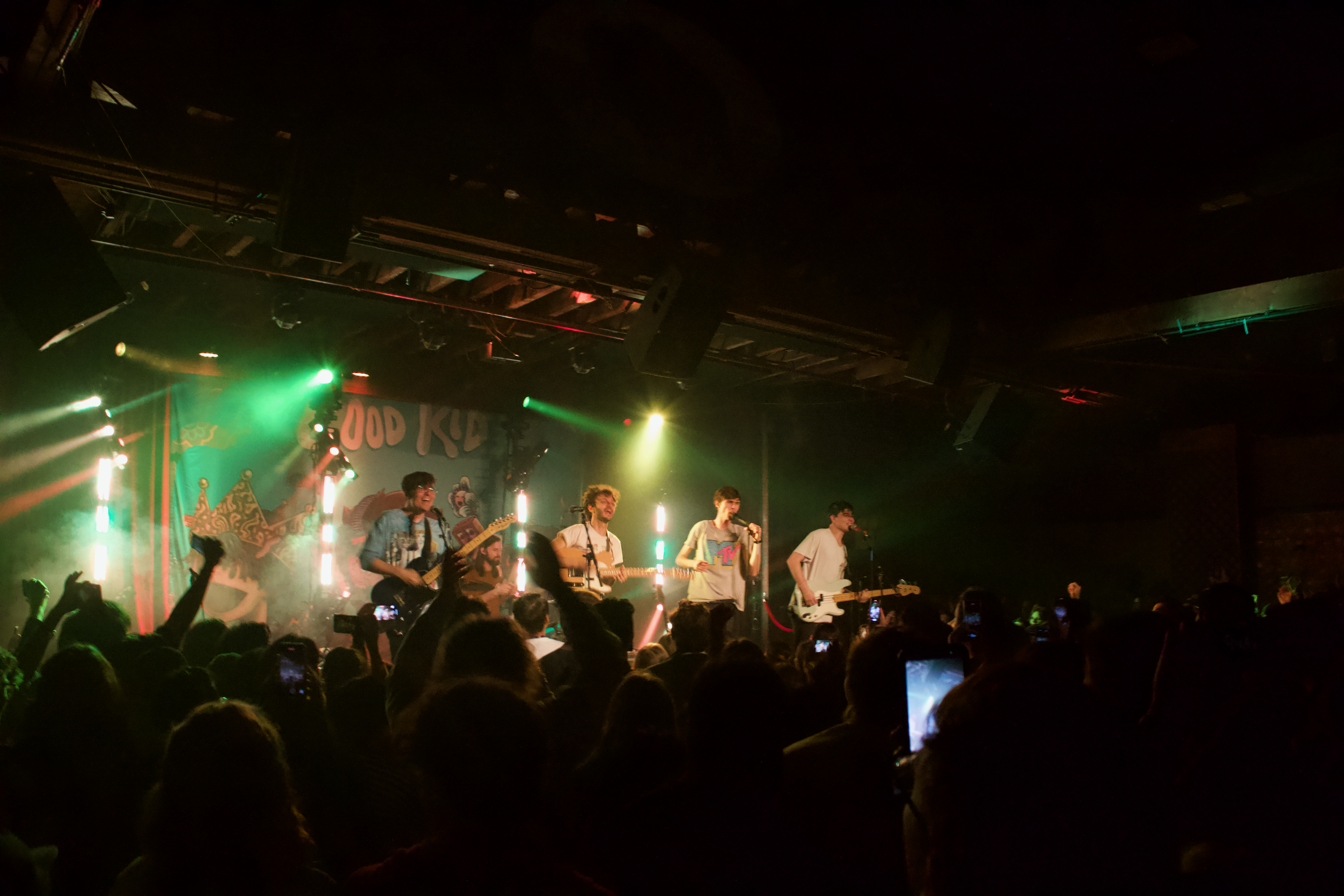
Good Kid performing at The Bell House in 2023

=== 2010 ===
On January 19 and 20, 2010, French electropop singer Charlotte Gainsbourg performed at The Bell House to promote her third album IRM.

On June 22, 2010, the movie Tell Your Friends! The Concert Film! was recorded at the Bell House. It went on to have its world premiere at the 2011 SXSW Film Festival. It starred Reggie Watts, Kurt Braunohler, Kristen Schaal, Liam McEneaney, and Kumail Nanjiani.

=== 2011 ===
On October 20, 2011, comedy and interview podcast How Was Your Week with Julie Klausner hosted by Julie Klausner recorded its first live show with Ted Leo, Fred Armisen, Paul F. Tompkins and Billy Eichner.

=== 2012 ===
On December 21, 2012, the Netflix original comedy special John Hodgman: Ragnarok was filmed here. The special was named for the Ragnarök, a series of cataclysmic events foretold in Norse mythology, and the date of filming was chosen for its significance as the end date of the Mayan calendar.

=== 2013 ===
On June 27, 2013, alt-country trio Puss n Boots recorded live tracks from the venue for their 2014 debut full-length album No Fools, No Fun.

=== 2014 ===
On May 30, 2014, indie rock group Bambi Kino performed a benefit concert.

On June 5, 2014, Americana/folk group Molly and the Zombies performed at The Bell House with Jared Hart of The Scandals and Dave Hause as opening acts.

=== 2015 ===
On September 11, 2015, a preview of humorist John Hodgman's show Vacationland played.

=== 2016 ===
On January 10, 2016, comedian Liam McEneaney recorded his second album, Working Class Fancy, for Comedy Dynamics at The Bell House, with support acts Colin Jost, Dave Hill, and Rob Paravonian.

On December 17, 2016, YouTuber, comedian and entertainer Joe Santagato had a charity meet and greet event here.

=== 2017 ===
On September 6, 2017, the rock supergroup Filthy Friends performed.

=== 2018 ===
The tenth anniversary of the venue was celebrated with shows featuring Waxahatchee, Night Shops and Anna St. Louis as well as Shellac, and Ex Hex.

=== 2024 ===
On June 9, 2024, T4T Comedy hosted by Ella Yurman, Terrence Dugan, and Rose Tablizo celebrated its second anniversary at The Bell House. The show featured over 75 transgender comedians performing 60 seconds of material each.
