= Villanova (short story) =

- Short story by John Hodgman
- Country: United States
- Language: English
- Genre(s): Short story

Publication
- Published in: One Story
- Publication type: Periodical
- Publisher: One Story, Inc.
- Media type: Print (Magazine)
- Publication date: April 1, 2002

"Villanova" (or "How I Became a Former Professional Literary Agent") is a short story by American humorist John Hodgman. It was first published in the first issue of One Story on April 1, 2002.

== Premise ==
While attending a 1998 romance and western fiction writers' conference in an Oklahoma City Embassy Suites, an unnamed literary agent stumbles across an elusive science fiction writer who has largely disappeared since the 1970s after publishing an incomplete trilogy.

The story is interspersed with excerpts from a fictional June 1979 Playboy magazine article called "Where Is Darling Egan?"

== Publication ==
The original publication of Villanova was limited to a print run of 600 with an overall cost of $1,000.

Villanova was republished as "How I Became a Former Professional Literary Agent" in the final chapter "The Beginning" for Hodgman's 2011 satirical almanac That Is All.

== Reception ==
New York Journal of Books's Vinton Rafe McCabe reviewed the story (along with the penultimate That Is All chapter "The End") as "honestly, in and of themselves, worth the cost of all three books."
