= Ferreiraella populi =

Scientific classification
- Kingdom: Animalia
- Phylum: Mollusca
- Class: Polyplacophora
- Order: Lepidopleurida
- Family: Abyssochitonidae
- Genus: Ferreiraella
- Species: F. populi

Binomial name
- Ferreiraella populi Sigwart, 2026

Species of mollusc

Ferreiraella populi is a species of chiton, which is a type of marine polyplacophoran mollusc distinguished by eight articulating shell plates and bodies that are flattened dorsoventrally. Chitons live in a variety of environments, from intertidal zones to deep-sea areas. F. populi is a member of the Ferreiraella genus, of which there are ten members and two subspecies, including F. populi. Ferreiraella is the only genus in the family Ferreiraellidae. The Family and genus are endemic to sunken wood. Ferreiraellidae is not unique in being endemic to wood, as the family Nierstraszellidae is also endemic to sunken wood.

== Description ==
Ferreiraella populi shares the comb form sweeper teeth of its genus. However, the sweeper teeth of F. populi are notably smaller than in other members of its genus. Their inner brush-shaped teeth are also present in some other members of the genus. F. populi is superficially most similar to F. tsuchidai in appearance. Both species have similar valve shape and elevation; they also live at similar depths. This species can be distinguished from the other members of its genus by the smaller tail valve, its aesthetes with fewer pores in a bundle, and their stretched bundles. Like other species in its genus, F. populi is also commonly host to epibiotic serpulid tubeworms on their tail valves.

== Distribution and habitat ==
Ferreiraella populi was found off the coast of Japan and collected while on a piece of sunken wood. It is the third species of the genus identified in Japan to date. F. populi, like the other members of its genus, occurs on sunken wood, which they consume.

== Naming ==
The species was named via an online naming competition hosted by the YouTube channel Ze Frank. The name is derived from Latin populi, meaning of the people. 11 users suggested this name from over 10,000 comments.
