= Vacationland =

Vacationland may refer to:

- An official slogan for the state of Maine
- Vacationland (comedy show), a 2015 stand-up comedy show by John Hodgman
- Vacationland (film), a 2006 film by Todd Verow
- MV Vacationland, a ferry that crossed the Northumberland Strait between New Brunswick and PEI, Canada
- Vacationland (Great Lakes ferry), a ferry that crossed the Straits of Mackinac in Michigan
- Vacationland (Ohio), colloquial name for an area of North-east and North-central Ohio
- Vacationland Hawaii, a former coastal subdivision on the island of Hawai'i
