= Glenn B. Hamm =

American artist (1936–1980)

Glenn Bruce Hamm Jr. (May 30, 1936 in Dayton, Ohio – August 15, 1980) was an artist who worked and lived in Richmond, Virginia.

He earned a BFA and MFA from Carnegie Mellon and a Ph.D. from Purdue University. Hamm taught art at Carlow College from 1963 to 1964, West Virginia University from 1965 to 1969 and Virginia Commonwealth University until his death from Lou Gehrig's Disease in 1980.

He is the author of the art instruction book, Painting the nude.

He is the father of the journalist Xeni Jardin and of Carl M. Hamm, "DJ Carlito", a Virginia disc jockey.

Virginia Commonwealth University's Art Department offers an annual academic award in his name.
