= Xeni Jardin =

American weblogger, digital and tech culture journalist

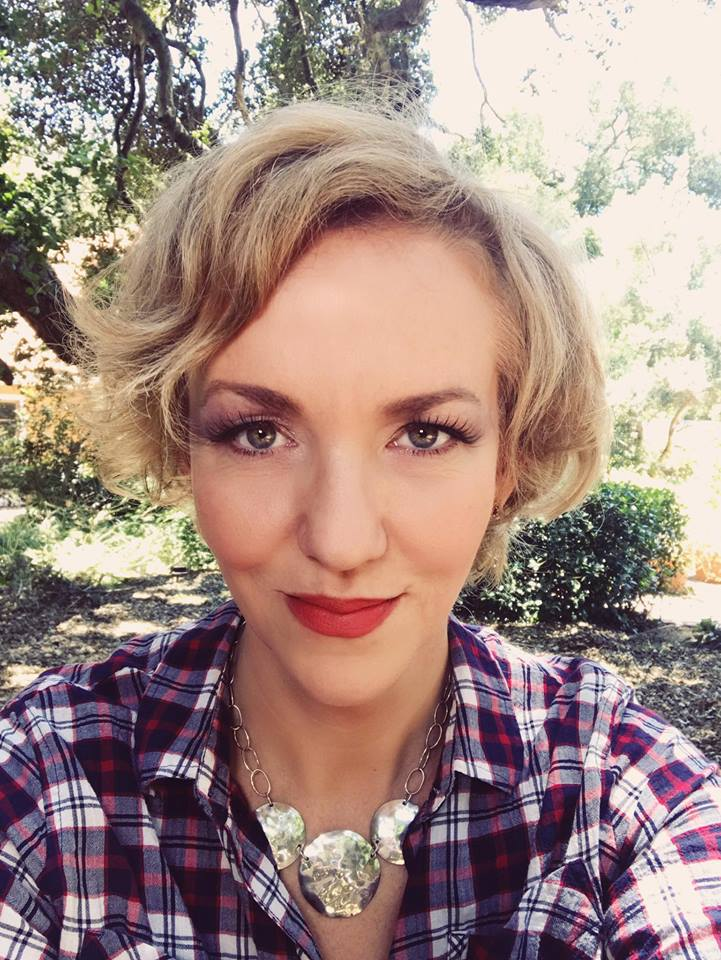
- Jardin in 2017
- Born: Jennifer Hamm; August 5, 1970 (age 56); Richmond, Virginia, U.S.
- Occupations: Journalist, digital media commentator, weblogger, co-editor, technology news commentator
- Parent(s): Monica Rumsey; Glenn B. Hamm Jr

Xeni Jardin (/ˈʃɛni ʒɑːrˈdæ̃/; born Jennifer Hamm, August 5, 1970) is an American weblogger, digital media commentator, and tech culture journalist. She is known as a former co-editor of the collaborative weblog Boing Boing, a former contributor to Wired Magazine and Wired News, and a former correspondent for the National Public Radio show Day to Day. She has also worked as a guest technology news commentator for television networks such as PBS NewsHour, CNN, Fox News, MSNBC and ABC.

== Life and work ==
Jardin was born in Richmond, Virginia, on August 5, 1970. Her father, artist Glenn B. Hamm Jr., died in August 1980 of ALS. She left home at age 14, but remained in school in Richmond. Her brother, Carl M. Hamm, retained their family name, and is a Richmond, Virginia-based disc jockey, who performs under the stage name "DJ Carl Hamm" (formerly, "DJ Carlito").

Jardin previously stated that she preferred the name "Xeni Jardin" over her given name. "Xeni" is short for "Xeniflores," while "jardin" is the Spanish and French word for "garden". In May 2021, Jardin stated that she had been given this name by someone who had abused her, and she was now moving back to using her legal name.

Prior to becoming a journalist, she was site editor for travel agency Traveltrust, then Supervisor of Enterprise Web Technology for Latham & Watkins before working at Quaartz, an internet calendaring startup.

Her career as a journalist began in 1999 when she was associated with Jason Calacanis's Silicon Alley Reporter, first as a contributing editor, and later as Vice President of Silicon Alley's parent company, Rising Tide Studios. In 2001 she became a freelance writer for Wired and other magazines, and in 2002 she began contributing to Boing Boing after Mark Frauenfelder met her at a party and invited her to be a co-editor. Jardin has written op-ed pieces for The New York Times and the Los Angeles Times. She has been the main source of an article in The Age talking about the cultural relevance of Wikipedia articles, and the source for a New York Times article discussing Boing Boing's part in the creation of the Flying Spaghetti Monster internet meme.

Jardin is also involved in television and radio work. In 2003, she began contributing the "Xeni Tech" segment for NPR's show Day to Day, and has appeared as a guest on the NewsHour with Jim Lehrer to discuss The Washington Post's decision to remove their comments section (a step Boing Boing had also taken). She has made appearances on CNN, Fox News, MSNBC and ABC World News Tonight, and was featured on the BBC Radio 5 show Pods and Blogs discussing her work at Boing Boing. Jardin was the host and executive producer of the Webby recognized Boing Boing Video series. Boing Boing Video (originally branded as Boing Boing TV) was initially offered exclusively on Virgin America flights in 2007. Alongside technology and culture, Jardin has been covering the aftermath and atrocities that resulted from the Guatemalan Civil War since 2007.

In 2008, Jardin was the executive producer of the web series SPAMasterpiece Theater. Each episode features a dramatization of email spam, while the later episodes featured dramatic readings of email spam by humorist John Hodgman. In the third episode "Love Song of Kseniya," Jardin reads her own email spam.

A June 2008 controversy over Jardin's deleting from public view all posts and links associated with sex blogger Violet Blue in the wake of a falling-out led to discussions about journalism ethics and standards and media transparency.

On December 1, 2011, she live-blogged her first mammogram, which returned a positive diagnosis of breast cancer. Since her treatment and recovery she has become an outspoken advocate for the Affordable Care Act.

In 2012, Jardin became one of the initial supporters of the Freedom of the Press Foundation. In December 2016, after a dispute with Julian Assange regarding the supposed relations between WikiLeaks and the Trump campaign, she resigned from its board, citing health reasons.

In February 2021, Jardin left Boing Boing.
