= Begushchy Kosar =

Russian game show

- Genre: Game show
- Created by: Renat Timurshin
- Directed by: Denis Kurenkov (Seasons 1–2), Anatoly Shuvalov (Seasons 3–4)
- Creative directors: Renat Timurshin, Alexey Tikhonov
- Presented by: Alexei Zhirov
- Country of origin: Russia
- Original language: Russian
- No. of seasons: 4
- No. of episodes: 80

Production
- Executive producers: Kirill Yemelyanov, Anna Chekhovskaya
- Producers: Ruben Oganesyan (Seasons 1–2), Yuliana Kulova (Season 3), Yuliya Babkina (Season 3), Farid Azizov (Season 3), Mikhail Kukin (Season 4)
- Production locations: Moscow (Season 1), Krasnodar Region (Season 2), Russia (Seasons 3–4)
- Editors: Darya Yefremova (Seasons 1–2), Mikhail Osinin (Season 3), Ibragim Islamgirov (Season 4)
- Camera setup: multi-camera
- Running time: 25 minutes
- Production companies: JSC «TV Daryal» (Seasons 1–2), LLC «Weider» (Seasons 3–4)

Original release
- Network: Che

Related
- Billy on the Street

Begushchiy Kosar (Russian: Бегущий косарь, lit. Running Thousand) is a television quiz show where random passers-by earn 1000 rubles for quickly answering random questions from host Alexey Zhirov. It airs from Monday to Thursday tonight on Che channel. It is the Russian version of Billy Eichner's Billy on the Street.

== Rules ==
The host runs up to passers-by and asks questions to them in Moscow streets and other cities.

=== Stage 1 (Answer the questions) ===
The host runs up to the random passers-by and asks the question, and gives 1000 rubles if the right answer is given. If no one is able to answer right, then the host removes the question and says the right answer to the сamera lens.

The host finds two people when the break is before the Stage 2. Their goal is to name the circumference of each other's head in centimeters. After each of them has named their numbers, the host gives measuring tape to them and they start measuring each other's heads. The one who was closest to the right answer, receives 1000 rubles, but if a draw occurs, then each of contestants receives 1000 rubles.

The contest has changed during the break since episode 21. The host finds two persons the same way. One will need to read a rhyme but another must guess the author of it. If the second contestant guessed the correct author, they received 1000 rubles, and if not, then contestant who read a rhyme, receives 1000 rubles.

=== Stage 2 (Complete a phrase) ===
This stage has a few changes then Stage 1. The host runs up to passers-by as well and ass for them to complete a phrase. One who is able to complete it will receive 1000 rubles.

After Stage 2 is over, a short contest is leading during the break before Stage 3. The host is looks for two strangers and offers them to play a quick checkers in a minute. One who «ate» a large number of opponent's checkers more than an opponent himself, will receive 1 000 rubles.

=== Stage 3 ("Yes" or "No") ===
Stage 3 almost has not differences from the previous. The host ask the question, to which the passer-by must answer "yes" or "no". If the answer is right, then the passer-by has a 1 000 rubles in his pocket.

=== The Final Game ===
In the final game contestants can earn 3 000 rubles. Three random lucky men will be offered three tasks to complete: in first will have to show the sides of light which will be called by the host for each of them. In the task 2 the host using signs shows a word to contestants that they must guess (The Crocodile Game). In the task 3 by the turns contestants must solve the example orally. The host calls the sequence of 7 numbers, then he tells an 'equal sign', but contestants must call the sum. The thousand rubles is giving for each task completed right.

The first task was changed since episode 6. Contestants in their turns must call seven cities to a letter the host calls in 20 seconds.

== Facts ==
- Season 1 (1–20 episodes) was filmed in Moscow, but since season 2 it has filmed in other Russian cities.
- Maximum amount of money that was handed by the host out during an episode, is 47 000 rubles, but minimum amount is 22 000 rubles.
- The longest way walked by the host is 10 240 metres, but the shortest is 1 030 metres.
