= Ella Yurman =

American talk show host

Yurman performing at Club Cumming in 2024

Ella Yurman (born 1998 or 1999) is an American talk show host, writer, and comedian. She is known for creating and hosting Going Down with Ella Yurman and Late Stage Live! as well as for her 2025 Teen Vogue interview of Vivian Wilson.

Yurman has been cited as a prominent Gen Z influencer by Cosmopolitan, and her interview of Wilson earned her a GLAAD Media Award nomination in 2026 for outstanding journalism.

== Talk shows ==
=== Late Stage Live! ===
In 2023 Yurman, along with co-creator and Head Writer Reid Pope, launched Late Stage Live!, a monthly, volunteer-run talk show for a primarily Gen Z, LGBTQ audience airing on YouTube and Brooklyn Public Access. Inspired by the format of The Daily Show with Jon Stewart, LSL episodes included an opening monologue, sketches and interviews, and deep dives into topical news stories.

Before creating LSL, Yurman worked as a writer for the YouTube series Some More News. She was inspired to start the show after noticing there were no trans late night talk show hosts or prominent political commentators. Together she and Pope reached out to fellow queer Brooklyn comedians, including the show's Senior Writer Rima Parikh, to staff their volunteer writers room. Neither Yurman nor Pope had prior experience in television production.

I went and worked on a friend’s live show that was all volunteer run and was fully live-streamed out to the public and it was crazy — this huge day, messy, chaotic. I had so much fun doing it and the big realization for me was that you can just do stuff in Brooklyn once you know enough comedians and artists. People are willing to collaboratively work on one big project, which was a big revelation for me because Reid and I both come from standup backgrounds and standup is such a solitary art form.

— Yurman in interview with Them, July 2024

With episodes airing monthly, Late Stage Live! ran from September 2023 to November 2024.

=== Going Down with Ella Yurman ===
After ending work on Late Stage Live! in late 2024, in 2025 Yurman and Pope launched Going Down with Ella Yurman, a trans-led political comedy news show and successor to Late Stage Live. Notable guests on Going Down have included Molly Crabapple, Julian Shapiro-Barnum, Ivy Wolk, Claire Valdez, Chris Gethard, and Vivian Wilson, among others.

New York Magazine's The Cut described Going Down as "a very good YouTube news series" in 2025.

== Interview of Vivian Wilson ==
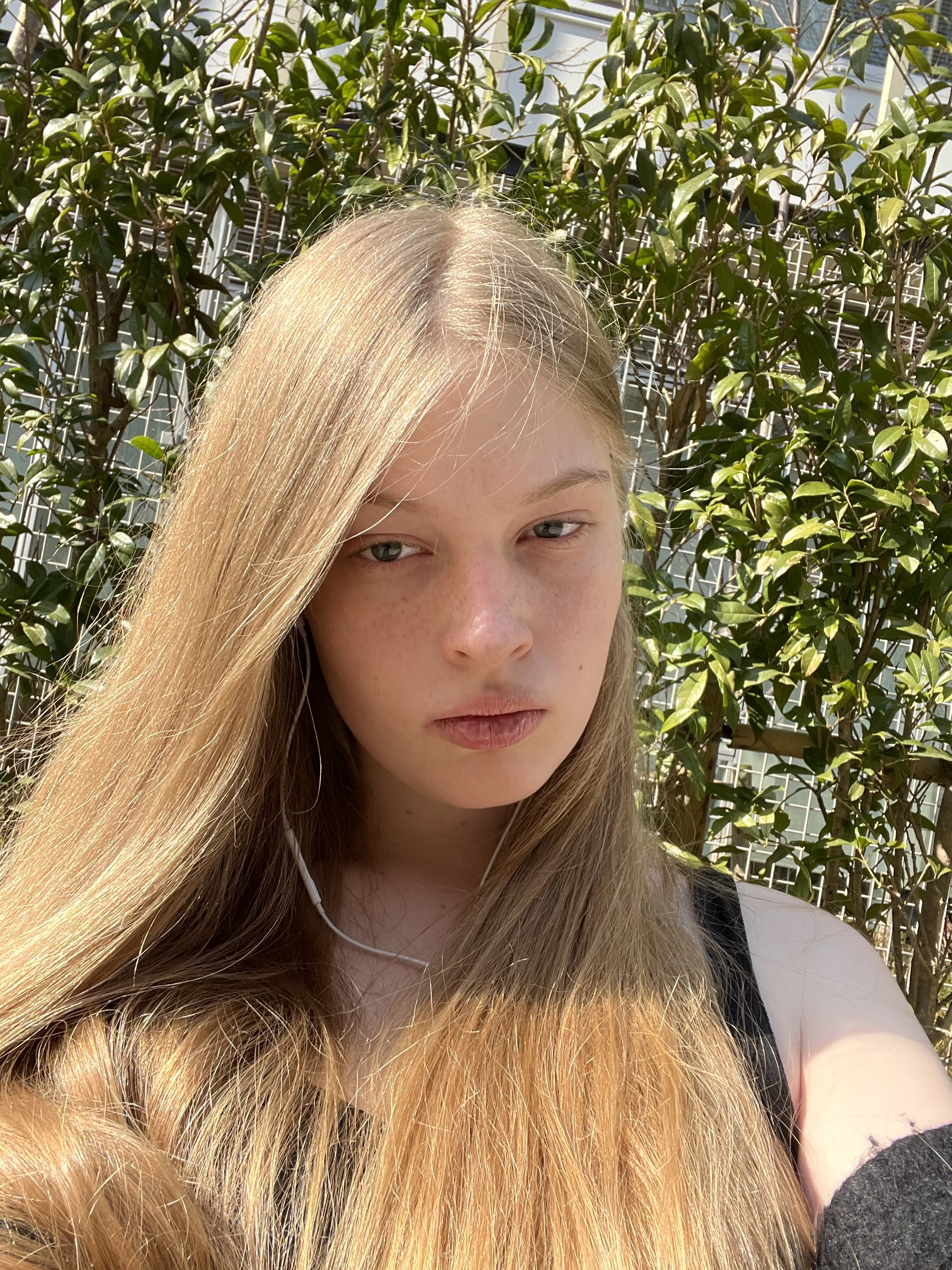
Vivian Wilson, pictured a month before her March 2025 interview by Yurman in Teen Vogue

In March 2025 Teen Vogue published a profile of Vivian Wilson by Yurman for its special issue cover story. The interview quickly gained attention on social media, and was covered by The New York Times and The Cut, highlighted as a great read by Politico, and included by Salon in its list of "the 7 best takedowns of a chaotic 2025" for its impact on the public image of Elon Musk, Wilson's disowned father.

Yurman remarked to The New York Times of the interview that "I think a lot of coverage of trans people these days, even high-profile trans people, ends up centering their transness so much that it reduces them to two-dimensional figures without interiority. Most of all, I wanted this piece to give Vivian a chance to be herself in front of the world." The interview was nominated for the 37th GLAAD Media Awards in 2026 in the category Outstanding Online or Print Journalism Article in 2026.

== Other work ==
In 2022 Yurman founded T4T, a monthly all-trans standup comedy show, alongside her cohost Terrence Dugan. Yurman and Dugan hosted the show at Metropolitan Bar in Williamsburg, Brooklyn every month for two years, including a two-year "Anniversary Spectacular" at popular Brooklyn comedy venue The Bell House, after which Yurman stepped away from hosting duties to focus on producing Going Down.

== Reception ==
In a 2024 article, Jezebel called Yurman "a generational talent with the sort of stage presence and charisma that make her one to watch". She was cited as a prominent Gen Z influencer by Cosmopolitan in 2025. She has also been featured in The New York Times, Politico, and Teen Vogue.
