= I Don't Care About Your Band =

2010 book by Julie Klausner

I Don't Care About Your Band What I Learned From Indie Rockers, Trust Funders, Pornographers, Faux-Sensitive Hipsters, Felons and Other Guys I've Dated
- Cover of the first edition
- Author: Julie Klausner
- Language: English
- Subject: Memoir
- Publisher: Gotham Books
- Publication date: January 2010
- Publication place: United States
- Media type: Print (paperback)
- Pages: 272 pp (first edition)
- ISBN: 978-1-59240-561-9

I Don't Care About Your Band: What I Learned From Indie Rockers, Trust Funders, Pornographers, Faux-Sensitive Hipsters, Felons and Other Guys I've Dated is an autobiographical memoir written by comedian Julie Klausner. Published in January 2010 by Gotham Books, the book was inspired by Klausner's New York Times "Modern Love" piece about getting the brush-off from an indie rock musician.

The book details Klausner's many romantic and sexual misadventures throughout her 20s. It features the foibles of Julie as she semi-fictionally recounts dysfunctional relationship after dysfunctional relationship.

In July 2010, it was announced that Will Ferrell and Adam McKay's production company, Gary Sanchez Productions, optioned the book for HBO. Lizzy Caplan was attached to star and co-produce.
