= Cynthia Hopkins =

American theatre artist and composer

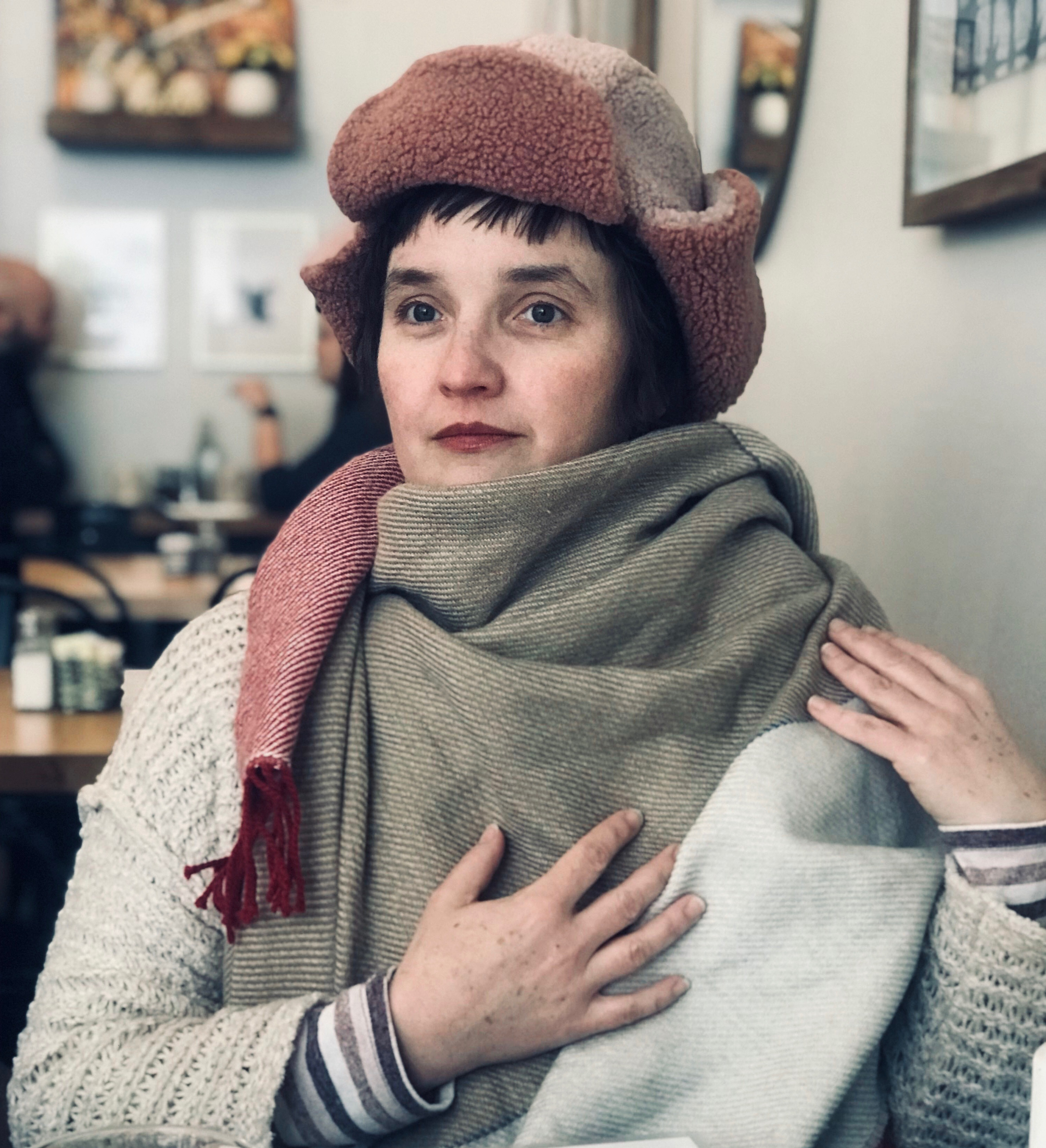
- Hopkins in Philadelphia, 2020

Background information
- Occupations: Performance Artist, Musician, Songwriter
- Member of: Fellwalker

Cynthia Hopkins is an American performance artist, composer, and musician.

== Performance work ==
She has written, composed, and performed five works of performance art at a number of theaters around the world, including St. Ann's Warehouse in Brooklyn, New York, The Kitchen in Manhattan, and the Walker Art Center in Minneapolis, Minnesota. On December 21, 2012, she performed during and had her music performed on the John Hodgman: Ragnarok special, which was streamed on Netflix on June 20, 2013. Her work, This Clement World, was reviewed in The New York Times by Jason Zinoman and by Charles Isherwood.

In addition Hopkins' work as a solo performance artist, she regularly collaborates with Annie-B Parson and Paul Lazar of the Big Dance Theater and acts in other theatrical pieces. This work has included Alan Smithee Directed This Play (BAM Next Wave Festival 2015) and Ich, Kürbisgeist (The Kitchen 2014).

In her work as a performer, Hopkins sings and plays the accordion, guitar, piano, and the musical saw. As a musician, she has self-produced five full-length albums.

In 2019, Hopkins began collaborating with composer James Lavino. They later formed the band Fellwalker. Their debut EP, Shelter, was released in 2020. A second EP, The Long Distance, and a full-length album, Love Is the Means, were released in 2021. They are frequent collaborators with drummers Dave King of The Bad Plus and Charlie Hall of The War on Drugs.

== Discography ==
- Gloria Deluxe (1999)
- Hooker (2000)
- Devotionals (2001)
- Alas Alack (2002)
- Accidental Nostalgia (2005)
- Must Don't Whip ‘Um (2008)
- The Success of Failure (or, The Failure of Success) (2009)
- The Truth: A Tragedy (2010)

=== with Fellwalker ===
- 2020: Shelter [EP]
- 2021: The Long Distance [EP]
- 2021: Love Is the Means
- 2023: Redeemable [EP]

== Awards and Fellowships ==
- Bessie Award
- Obie Award (two-time winner)
- Alpert Award in Theater (2007)
- Guggenheim Fellowship (2010)
- Foundation for Contemporary Arts Grants to Artists award (2015)
