= How Was Your Week with Julie Klausner =

2011–2020 podcast

How Was Your Week? with Julie Klausner
- Logo for How Was Your Week with Julie Klausner

Presentation
- Hosted by: Julie Klausner
- Genre: Comedy, Talk show
- Format: Audio
- Language: English
- Updates: Irregularly
- Length: 75–90 minutes

Production
- Production: Chris Spooner, Brett Boham

Publication
- Original release: March 8, 2011; 14 years ago
- License: © Julie Klausner

How Was Your Week with Julie Klausner is a comedy and interview audio podcast hosted by writer and performer Julie Klausner. The episodes vary in length, and include conversations with entertainers, writers, comedians, and performers. The show is usually recorded in Klausner's home, which sets an informal tone. The show originally ran from March 8, 2011 until May 29, 2020, for a total of 236 episodes. In October 2024, the podcast returned on the Forever Dog podcast network.

== Format ==
Each episode is anchored by an opening monologue and usually includes one or two interviews. Klausner often prompts her guests to discuss things they would not typically be asked to talk about in a formal interview, such as their opinions on current reality TV shows, or gossip and stories from their early career. As a host, Klausner has been described as having a "literate sensibility and affection for showmanship," which inspires her to include the occasional song along with her rambling digressions on high and low culture.

Regular subjects of Klausner's monologues include pets, television, film, musical theater, current events, American politics, what is happening on Twitter, and who she considers worthy of inclusion in a list known as the "Redhead Hall of Fame", using each topic as a platform for comedic improvisation and performance.

Notable guests who have appeared on How Was Your Week include David Rakoff, Joan Rivers, Michael Ian Black, Jon Ronson, Patton Oswalt, Martha Plimpton, Ana Gasteyer, Kurt Loder, Retta, Eddie Pepitone, Chris Parnell, Mo Rocca, Jim Gaffigan, Carole Radziwill, Todd Oldham, Sandra Bernhard, Tom Scharpling, Andrew McCarthy, Mike Birbiglia, and Carrie Brownstein, among others.

== History ==
Klausner created How Was Your Week in early 2011 after being encouraged to start a podcast by comedian Patton Oswalt via Twitter. She looked for format inspiration by listening to comedy broadcasts such as The Best Show on WFMU with Tom Scharpling and WTF with Marc Maron.

In 2011 Rolling Stone named How Was Your Week as #4 on their list of ten best comedy podcasts.

The first live recording of the show took place October 20, 2011 at The Bell House in Brooklyn, New York, and featured Ted Leo, Fred Armisen, Paul F. Tompkins and Billy Eichner.
