= Vacationland (comedy show) =

American comedy series

- Comedy tour by John Hodgman
- Tour poster designed by comic book artist Adam Hughes featuring humorist John Hodgman amid cairns.
- Location: North America
- Start date: September 12, 2015
- End date: November 7, 2015
- No. of shows: 15
- Website: www.johnhodgman.com/tour

John Hodgman concert chronology
- I Stole Your Dad (2013–14); Vacationland (2015)

Vacationland is a stand-up comedy series starring American author, actor, and humorist John Hodgman. Vacationland played in fifteen cities, debuting on September 12, 2015, at the Wilbur Theatre in Boston, Massachusetts and ending on November 7, 2015, at Ohio University in Athens, Ohio with The Daily Show correspondent Jordan Klepper.

== Premise ==
Vacationland is a 75-minute one-person show presented by comedian John Hodgman. It is named after Maine's current nickname.

Concert tour industry trade publication Pollstar noted in Vacationland's press release the topics that will be discussed as "how the people of various rural towns are probably planning to sacrifice you to their god," "[Hodgman's] exile to the state of Maine, home to the world's most painful beaches," and "the evolutionary purpose of the weird dad mustache."

== Tour dates ==
Initially, Vacationland was set to play in twelve cities. However, three more cities were added to the tour. After the publication of a Bangor Daily News interview with John Hodgman, a Portland, Maine tour date was added. Two previews of the show in Brooklyn, New York sold out.

Date	City	Country	Venue
10 September 2015 (preview)	Brooklyn, New York	United States	Union Hall
11 September 2015 (preview)	Brooklyn, New York	United States	The Bell House
12 September 2015	Boston, Massachusetts	United States	Wilbur Theatre
13 September 2015	Portland, Maine	United States	Port City Music Hall
22 September 2015	Atlanta, Georgia	United States	Plaza Theatre
23 September 2015	St. Louis, Missouri	United States	Ready Room
24 September 2015	Chicago, Illinois	United States	Thalia Hall
25 September 2015	Iowa City, Iowa	United States	Englert Theatre
26 September 2015	Madison, Wisconsin	United States	Barrymore Theatre
27 September 2015	Minneapolis, Minnesota	United States	The Cedar Cultural Center
29 September 2015	Toronto, Ontario	Canada	Just for Laughs Festival
13 October 2015	Vancouver, British Columbia	Canada	Rio Theatre
15 October 2015	Portland, Oregon	United States	Hollywood Theatre
16 October 2015	San Francisco, California	United States	Marines' Memorial Club
23 October 2015	Orlando, Florida	United States	The Plaza Live
24 October 2015	Durham, North Carolina	United States	Carolina Theatre
7 November 2015	Athens, Ohio	United States	Templeton-Blackburn Alumni Memorial Auditorium, Ohio State University

== Reception ==
Exclaim!'s Anthony Damiao said "Hodgman was the personification of patience; bearded and looking something like a high school guidance counsellor nearing retirement. He was sedate, measured and collected — imagine NPR on stage, with glasses."
