= John Hodgman =

American author, actor, and humorist (born 1971)

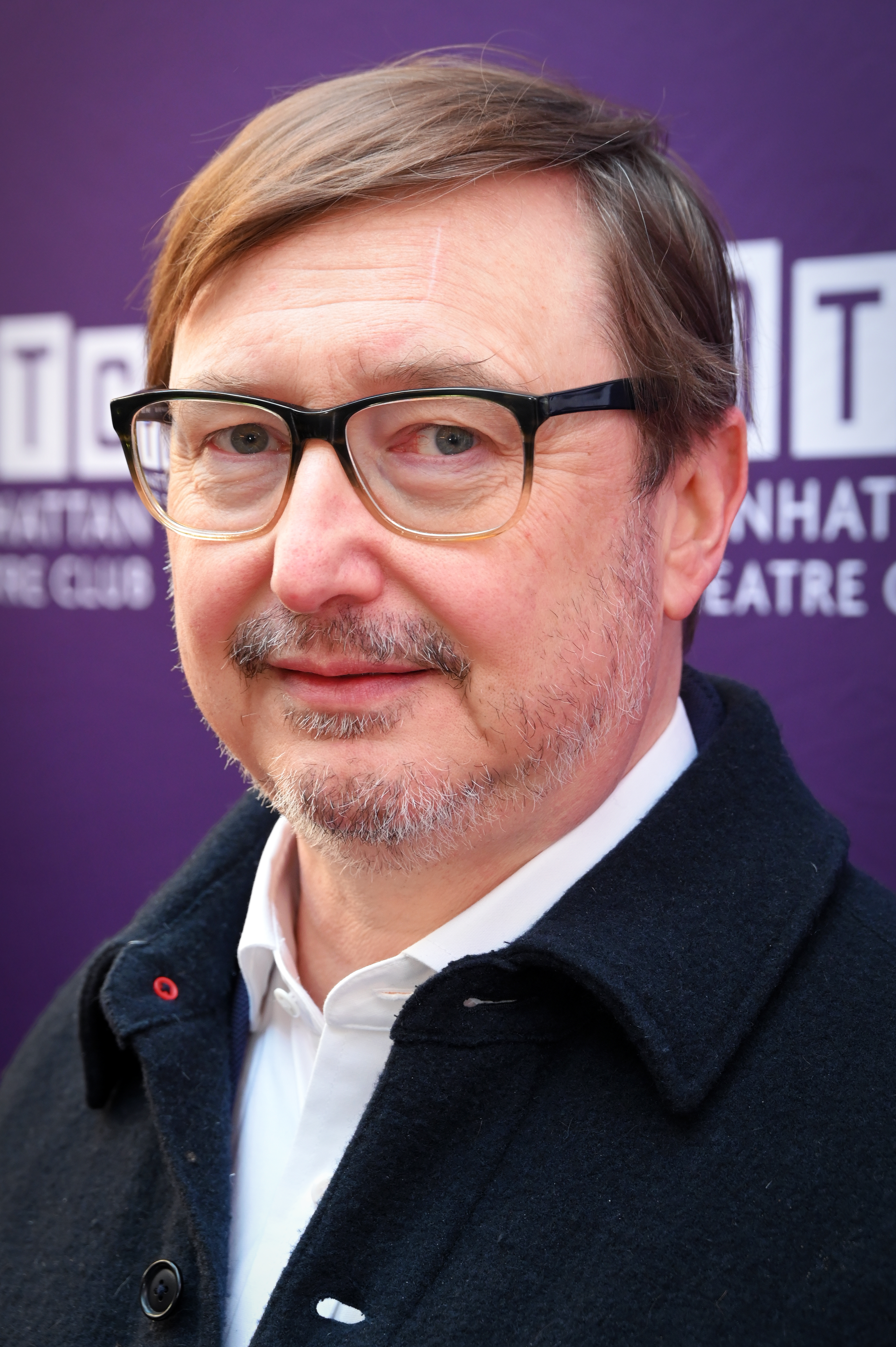
- Hodgman in 2026
- Born: John Kellogg Hodgman; June 3, 1971 (age 55); Brookline, Massachusetts, U.S.
- Education: Yale University
- Occupations: Actor; author; humorist; television personality
- Years active: 2005–present
- Spouse: Katherine Fletcher (m. 1999)
- Children: 2

John Kellogg Hodgman (born June 3, 1971) is an American author, actor, and humorist. In addition to his published written works, such as his satirical trilogy The Areas of My Expertise, More Information Than You Require, and That Is All, he is known for his personification of a PC in contrast to Justin Long's personification of a Mac in Apple's "Get a Mac" advertising campaign, and for his work as a contributor on Comedy Central's The Daily Show with Jon Stewart.

His writings have been published in One Story (to which he contributed the debut story "Villanova"), The Paris Review, McSweeney's Quarterly Concern, Wired and The New York Times Magazine. He has also contributed to This American Life, CBC Radio One, and Wiretap. His first book and accompanying audio narration, The Areas of My Expertise, a satirical tongue-in-cheek almanac that contains almost no factual information, was published in 2005. His second book, More Information Than You Require, went on sale October 21, 2008. His third book, That Is All, went on sale November 1, 2011. Vacationland: True Stories from Painful Beaches, a collection of "real life wanderings" about Hodgman's life experiences (especially in Western Massachusetts and coastal Maine), was published on October 24, 2017. Vacationland was a finalist for the 2018 Thurber Prize for American Humor. His most recent book, Medallion Status, was released on October 17, 2019.

Hodgman was the headline speaker at the 2009 Radio and Television Correspondents' Association dinner in Washington, D.C.

== Early life ==
Hodgman was born and raised in Brookline, Massachusetts, the son of Eileen (née Callahan), a nurse and educator, and John Francis Hodgman, the president and CEO of the Massachusetts Technology Development Corporation and a professor at Tufts University. He attended the Heath School and Brookline High School, where he edited the underground magazine Samizdat, named for the grassroots dissident publishing movement produced under the Soviet Bloc. During his last year of high school, he hosted the weekly Radio Consuelo show on freeform station WMFO in Medford.

In 1994 Hodgman graduated from Yale University with a degree in literature, focusing on literary criticism. Before gaining fame as a writer, Hodgman worked as a literary agent at Writers House in New York City, where he represented Darin Strauss, Deborah Digges, and actor Bruce Campbell, among others. Hodgman has used his experience as an agent in his column "Ask a Former Professional Literary Agent" at McSweeney's Internet Tendency.

== Career ==
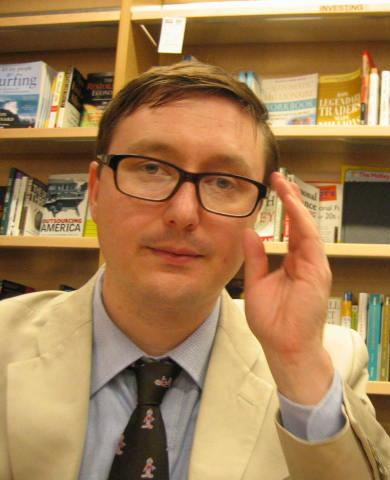
Hodgman at a reading in 2006

Hodgman appeared on The Daily Show on November 16, 2005, to promote his book, The Areas of My Expertise. Host Jon Stewart described the book as "very funny" and said that the section on hobo names in particular was written with "a certain kind of genius." Hodgman has returned to the Daily Show numerous times for "resident expert" interview segments, and has been listed on the show's web site as a contributor.

In 2005, Hodgman played a character named "The Deranged Millionaire" in They Might Be Giants's Venue Songs DVD/CD, narrating in between songs with dialog he co-wrote with the band. The Deranged Millionaire character also appeared on The Daily Show on April 2, 2014. He also narrated a number of Venue Songs-themed setlists during the band's live shows in 2005, and has introduced the band while in the role of The Deranged Millionaire up to May 16, 2007. Hodgman appeared again with They Might Be Giants on The Late Late Show with Craig Ferguson, on December 11, 2009. Hodgman performed the spoken-word portions of the song "Why Does the Sun Shine?"

In February 2006, Hodgman appeared on Attack of the Show, a show that aired daily on G4, to share some insight with the host and promote his book The Areas of My Expertise. In this appearance, Hodgman recounted the sad tale of the lobster (which he said were actually a small, furry, extinct species, killed and replaced by the creatures we think of as lobsters today) and brought along Jonathan Coulton, a frequent Hodgman collaborator and musical director of the Little Gray Book lectures. Coulton performed a song called "Furry Old Lobster." Also, on October 18, 2008, Hodgman appeared again on Attack of the Show to talk about his newest book, More Information Than You Require.

Hodgman appeared in the North American Get a Mac advertising campaign for Apple Inc., which ran from May 2006 through 2010. In the ads he plays the personification of a PC alongside his Mac counterpart, played by actor Justin Long. In reality, however, Hodgman himself became a Mac user in 1984. On November 10, 2020, he made a surprise brief appearance at the 45:27 mark of Apple's virtual "One More Thing" event, where Apple unveiled its first Macs based on its own Apple silicon chips.

In 2007, Hodgman appeared in the "Bowie" episode of the HBO television series Flight of the Conchords. He played the manager of a musical greeting card company who was considering using one of the band's songs for a greeting card.

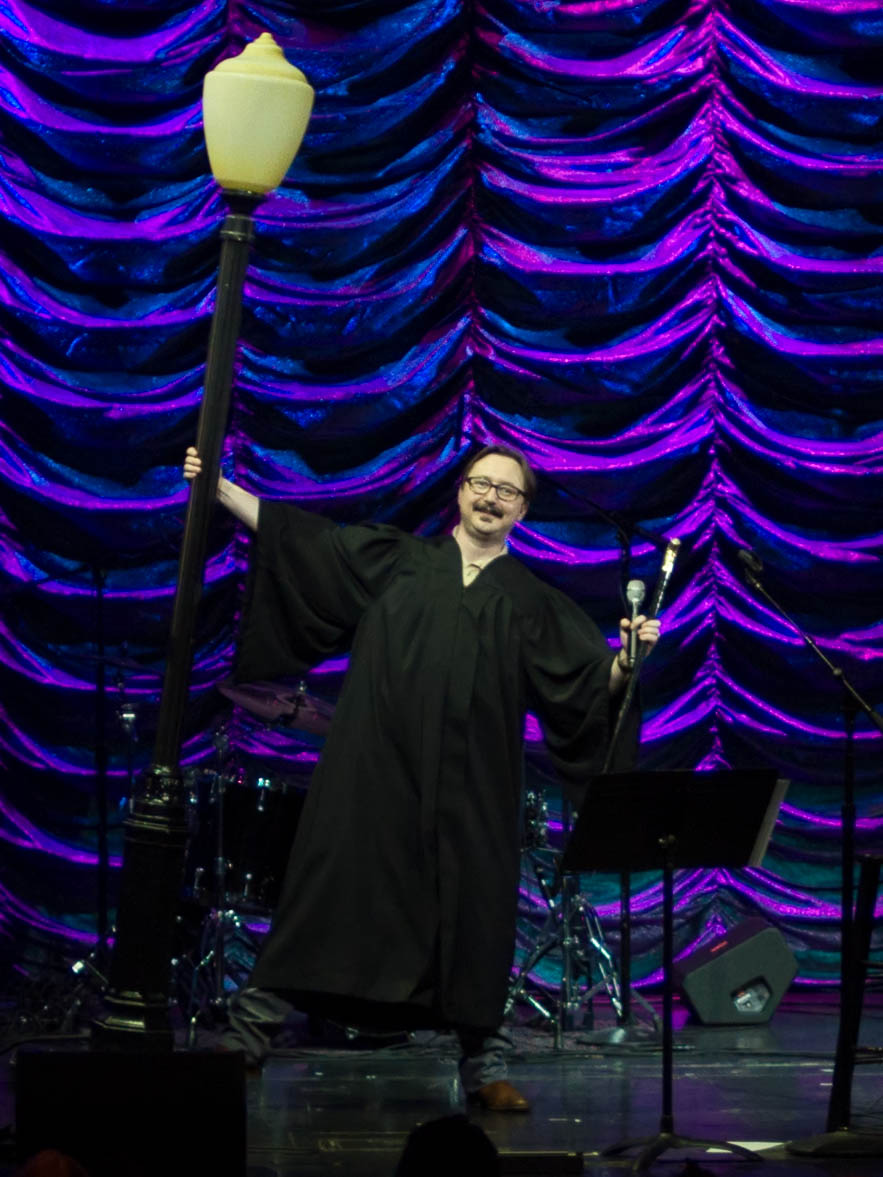
Hodgman during a live recording of Judge John Hodgman in 2013

On October 1, 2008, Boing Boing's Xeni Jardin announced the official debut of the web series SPAMasterpiece Theater. Hodgman himself described it as "true tale[s] of romance, adventure, infamy, and low-cost prescription drugs, all culled from the reams of actual, unsolicited emails, received here by us and people like you – what we call SPAM."

Hodgman appeared in the episode "No Exit" of Battlestar Galactica, appearing as the civilian neurosurgeon, Dr. Gerard. He had earlier visited the set in 2005 to write about the show for The New York Times Magazine.

On June 19, 2009, Hodgman was the headline speaker at the 2009 Radio and Television Correspondents' Association dinner in Washington, D.C. Hodgman referred to this event as a "Nerd Prom." Many of his jokes were on the topic of President Barack Obama as the first nerd president, and he quizzed the president on his knowledge of Frank Herbert's novel Dune.

Hodgman appeared in the last two episodes of the first season of Bored to Death, "The Case of the Stolen Sperm" and "Take a Dive," as a literary reviewer who wrote a bad review that offended the main character. He returned in the second and third seasons.

Hodgman voice-acted on The Venture Bros. in the episode "Self-Medication" as Dale Hale, an ex-boy detective in therapy following the death of his father. He has since had multiple appearances in Season 5 as O.S.I. operative Snoopy, along with other roles.

Also, during the 61st Primetime Emmy Awards in September 2009, Hodgman provided color commentary with made-up trivia about the winners. He reprised this role for the 62nd Primetime Emmy Awards in August 2010.

Because of his continuing support for QI, the BBC's intellectual comedy quiz shown on BBC America, Hodgman was invited to appear on the show. He was the first "fifth panelist" on the program broadcast December 3, 2009 (the usual line-up being Stephen Fry as host, Alan Davies as regular panelist and three guests)—and won, continuing the tradition of a guest winning their "rookie" appearance on the show.

In 2012, Hodgman guest-starred in an episode of Delocated called "Reunion Show," acting as the host of a fictional show-within-a-show. Also in 2012, he appeared as a psychiatrist in an episode of Community called "Curriculum Unavailable."

Hodgman made a guest appearance on the sitcom series Husbands in its second season.

In 2013, Hodgman starred as "Special Agent Henry Topple" in Wired's first scripted web series Codefellas.

Hodgman appeared as public radio personality August Clementine in the episode "Anniversaries" of Parks and Recreation, which aired in February 2014.

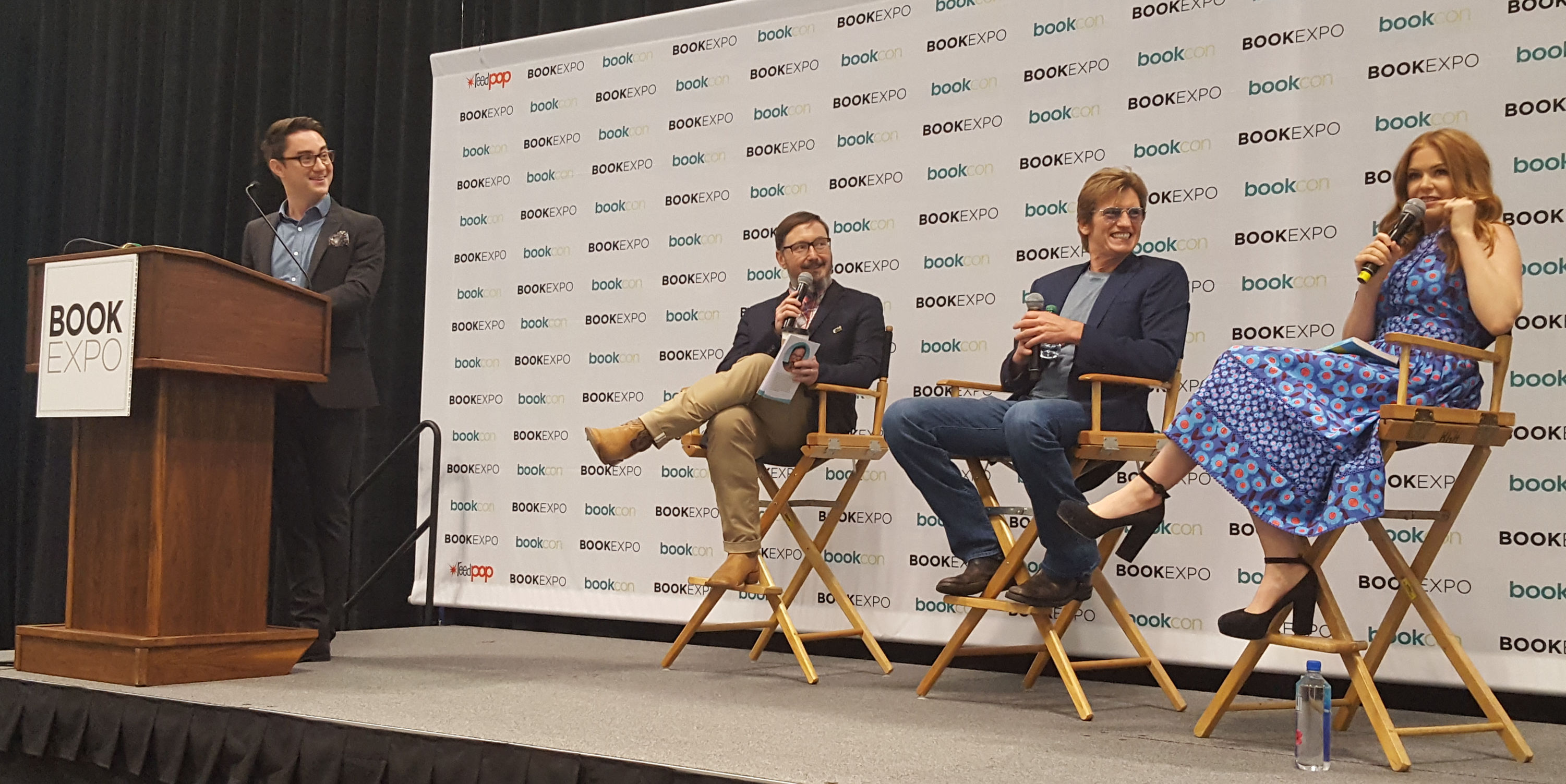
Hodgman at the BookExpo in 2017

Hodgman has a supporting role in the FX comedy Married, which premiered in July 2014. In December 2014, Hodgman appeared in three episodes of the Amazon Studios series Mozart in the Jungle.

In 2014–2015, Hodgman appeared for three episodes as a fictionalized version of psychiatrist and medical doctor Henry Cotton on the Cinemax series The Knick.

In 2016, Hodgman played the role of Travis, a local television station manager, in four episodes of the second season of Amazon's Red Oaks series.

In November 2017, Hodgman was named one of Portland Magazine's "10 Most Intriguing Mainers."

=== Netflix special ===
Netflix, the American streaming media website, aired the comedy special John Hodgman: Ragnarok on June 20, 2013, as a "Netflix Original". The special featured material from Hodgman's recent book, That Is All, and his December 21, 2012, show at The Bell House in New York.

=== Judge John Hodgman podcast ===
In 2010, Hodgman began hosting a weekly, comedic court show podcast called Judge John Hodgman. The program features Hodgman acting as a judge (with Jesse Thorn as bailiff) adjudicating real-life disputes within a fictional courtroom setting. The cases answer questions like, "Should the kitchen sink's built-in dispenser be filled with dish soap or hand soap?" and "Can you stop family members from using your childhood nickname?"

=== Dicktown ===
Hodgman teamed with fellow humorist David Rees to create the adult animated show Dicktown, which premiered in 2020. In 2022, the show aired its second season on FXX and Hulu. The show is written, directed and executive produced by Hodgman and Rees; Matt Thompson also executive produces. Dicktown follows the story of detective John Hunchman and his sidekick David Purefoy (voiced by Hodgman and Rees respectively).

== Filmography ==
=== Film ===
Year	Title	Role	Notes
2008	Baby Mama	Fertility Doctor	
2009	Coraline	Father/Other Father (voice)	
2009	The Invention of Lying	Wedding Overseer	
2010	The Best and the Brightest	Henry	
2011	Arthur	Candy Store Manager	
2013	Movie 43	The Penguin	Segment: "Super Hero Speed Dating"
2013	The English Teacher	Unmotivated Man	
2014	Learning to Drive	Car Salesman	
2015	Pitch Perfect 2	Tone Hanger	
2020	Class Action Park	Narrator	
2023	The Venture Bros.: Radiant Is the Blood of the Baboon Heart	Snoopy (voice)	
2025	The Dinner Plan	Nate	Short

=== Television ===
Year	Title	Role	Notes
2006–2015	The Daily Show	Himself (contributor)	73 episodes
2007	Flight of the Conchords	David Armstrong	Episode: "Bowie"
2008	SPAMasterpiece Theater	Himself	5 episodes
2009	QI	Himself	1 episode
2009–2011	Bored to Death	Louis Greene	8 episodes
2009–2018	The Venture Bros.	Snoopy / various (voice)	7 episodes
2009	Battlestar Galactica	Dr. Gerard	Episode: "No Exit"
2012	Phineas and Ferb	Additional voices	Episode: "The Doonkelberry Imperative/Buford Confidential"
2012	Delocated	Himself	Episode: "Reunion Show"
2012	Community	Dr. Heidi	Episode: "Curriculum Unavailable"
2012	30 Rock	Terry	Episode: "Mazel Tov, Dummies!"
2013	John Hodgman: Ragnarok	Himself	Television special
2013	Codefellas	Henry Topple	12 episodes
2013–2014	Wander Over Yonder	Lord of Illumination (voice)	2 episodes
2013–2017	Adventure Time	DJ Plop Drops / Elder Plops (voice)	2 episodes
2014	Parks and Recreation	August Clementine	Episode: "Anniversaries"
2014–2015	Married	Bernie	12 episodes
2014–2015	The Knick	Dr. Henry Cotton	3 episodes
2014	Mozart in the Jungle	Marlon	3 episodes
2015	Comedy Bang! Bang!	Dr. Travers	Episode: "Uzo Aduba Wears a White Blouse and Royal Blue Heels"
2015	Blunt Talk	David Frisch	2 episodes
2016–2020	Blindspot	Chief Inspector Jonas Fischer	4 episodes
2016	Odd Mom Out	Brad	Episode: "Knock of Shame"
2016	Milo Murphy's Law	Foreman (voice)	2 episodes
2016	Red Oaks	Travis	4 episodes
2016–2019	Jon Glaser Loves Gear	Gear-i (voice)	10 episodes
2018	The Who Was? Show	The Explanationator	Episode: "Albert Einstein & Joan of Arc"
2019	Patriot Act with Hasan Minhaj	Himself	Episode: "Student Loans"
2019	The Tick	Dr. Agent Hobbes	5 episodes
2019–2021	DuckTales	John D. Rockerduck (voice)	4 episodes
2019	Helpsters	Wayne of Wonder	Episode: "Wayne of Wonder"
2020	Kipo and the Age of Wonderbeasts	Billions (voice)	6 episodes
2020	Summer Camp Island	Bartholomole (voice)	Episode: "Molar Moles"
2020	Adventure Time: Distant Lands	Shafter (voice)	Episode: "BMO"
2020–2022	Dicktown	John Hunchman (voice)	20 episodes, also creator and writer
2022	Would I Lie to You? (US)	Himself	Episode: "English Breakfast in Jail"
2023	Poker Face	Narc	Episode: "Rest in Metal"
2023–2024	Hamster & Gretel	Micromanager (voice)	2 episodes
2023	Up Here	Tom	8 episodes
2023	Archer	Gary (voice)	Episode: "Face Off"
2024	Ghosts	Minister Nathaniel	Episode: "Patience"
2024	Star Wars: Skeleton Crew	Snobbius Snee (voice)	Episode: "Zero Friends Again"
2026	Rick and Morty	Wander (voice)	Episode: "Mortgully: The Last Rickforest"

== Other media appearances ==
=== Video game appearances ===
- 2015: Minecraft: Story Mode as Soren the Architect
- A character in the browser-based multiplayer role-playing game Kingdom of Loathing bears the name 'Hodgman, The Hoboverlord' in his honor.

=== Podcasts and radio appearances ===
Hodgman has been a guest on radio programs including WBEZ's This American Life, NPR's Wait, Wait, Don't Tell Me, WFMU's The Best Show on WFMU, North Carolina Public Radio's The State of Things, Oregon Public Broadcasting's Live Wire Radio, and BBC's The Museum of Curiosity.

Hodgman has appeared in two City Arts & Lectures events: in November 2008, Dave Eggers interviewed him; and in May 2013, he interviewed Adam Savage. Both interviews were held in front of a live theater audience and were also broadcast on NPR.

Hodgman has been featured on many podcasts. He made occasional appearances as "Judge John Hodgman" on Jordan, Jesse, Go!, which led to a stand-alone podcast. He was a guest on This Week In Tech with Leo Laporte, Stuff You Should Know, My Brother, My Brother and Me, the Doughboys podcast with Mike Mitchell and Nick Wiger, Neil deGrasse Tyson's podcast StarTalk Radio, Ken Reid's TV Guidance Counselor, and Boing Boing TV. Alongside Jonathan Coulton, he was a guest on episodes of The Sound of Young America and Merlin Mann's You Look Nice Today.

=== Online ===
- Husbands guest star, season two
- Patriot Act with Hasan Minhaj episode "Student Loans"
- Triangulation Episode 72 on October 3, 2012
- the show with zefrank
- TED
- Diggnation Episode 231
- Today in the Past (podcast)
- Two articles on the website Open Letters in the year 2000. In them, he details a family trip to Ocean City, New Jersey shortly after his mother's death, and uses his experiences there as metaphors for life and death.
- Transcript of welcoming remarks at a literary reading shortly after the terrorist attacks of 9/11
- Guest player on HarmonQuest season one as the sandwich sorcerer
- Get a Mac web ads, as PC.
- Judge John Hodgman (podcast)
- Get Your Pets: The daytime talk show during which Hodgman interviews cats, dogs, and other pets via Instagram live.

=== Music ===
- Hodgman was featured on the track "Question and Answer Time" on MC Frontalot's 2010 album Zero Day.
- Hodgman has appeared in two indie music videos directed by Tom Scharpling. The first was Ted Leo & The Pharmacists "Bottled In Cork," followed by The New Pornographers' "Moves."
- Hodgman appeared in the opening section of Aimee Mann's video for "Charmer" from the album of the same name, also written and directed by Scharpling.
- Hodgman featured on the track "Don't Worry It's Fine" on Jean Grae & Quelle Chris' 2018 album Everything's Fine.

== In print ==
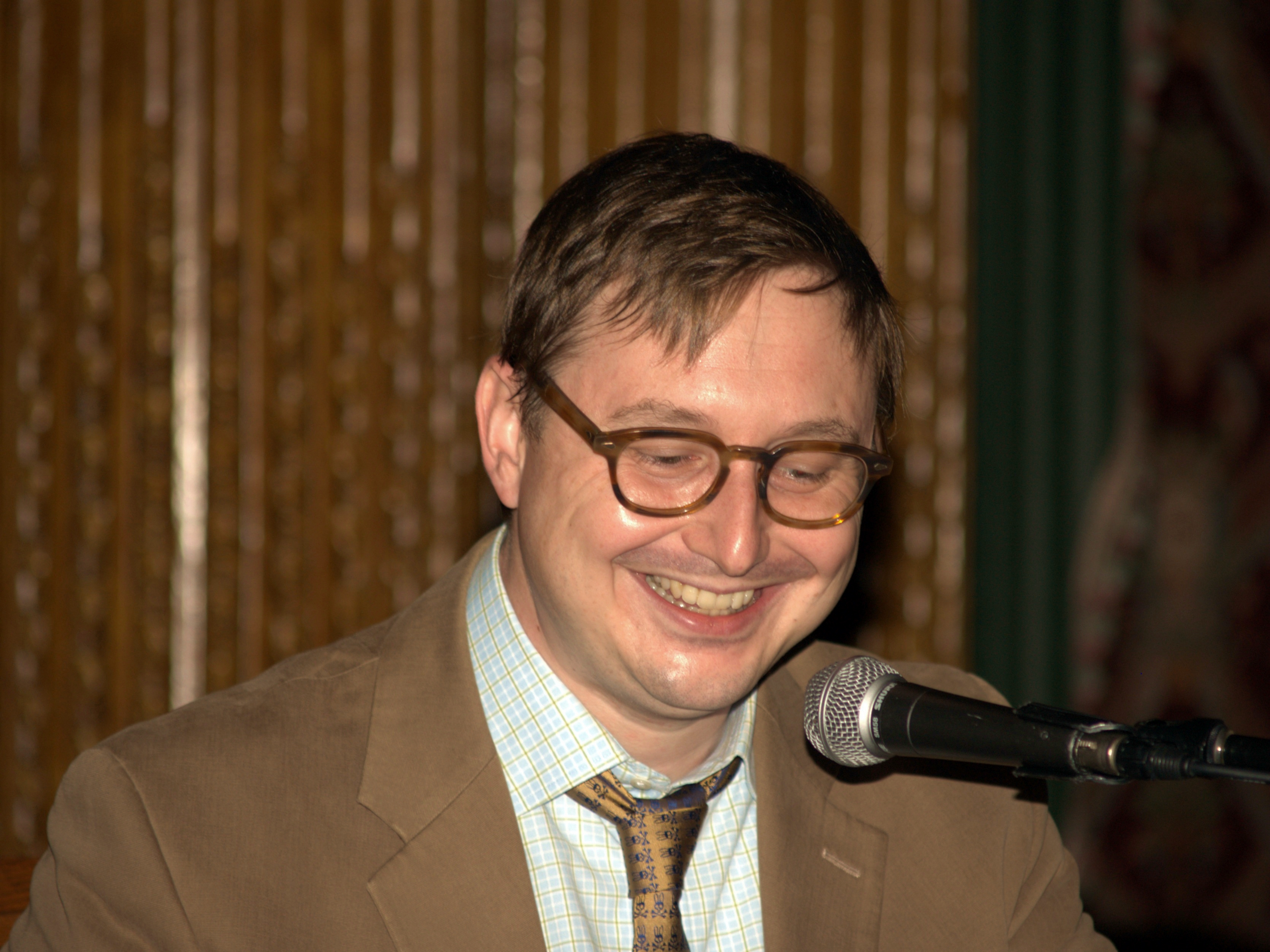
Hodgman at the 2010 Brooklyn Book Festival

As contributor:

- Hodgman appears on the cover of the February 2007 edition of Wired Magazine, as a contributor to their "What we don't know about..." articles.
- Hodgman oversaw the "True Life Tales" section of the Sunday New York Times Magazine. The section is currently on hiatus. He also writes the "Bonus Advice from Judge John Hodgman" section of "The Ethicist" column by Kwame Appiah in the magazine.
- Hodgman has guest written for the "Sedaratives" section of The Believer. "Sedaratives" is an advice column created by Amy Sedaris.
- Hodgman wrote the Massachusetts chapter in the anthology State by State: A Panoramic Portrait of America.
- Hodgman wrote the introduction to The Laugh-Out-Loud Cats Sell Out (2009), a collection of Adam Koford's Hobotopia comic strips.
- Hodgman founded The Little Gray Book Lectures in Williamsburg, Brooklyn. The lectures have been on hiatus "for the foreseeable future" as of August 2007.

As author:

- The Areas of My Expertise (ISBN 0-525-94908-9, 2005)
- More Information Than You Require (ISBN 0-525-95034-6, October 2008)
- That Is All (ISBN 0-525-95244-6, November 2011)
- Vacationland: True Stories from Painful Beaches (ISBN 0-735-22480-3, October 2017)
- Medallion Status: True Stories from Secret Rooms (ISBN 0-525-56110-2, October 2019)
