= Billy on the Street =

American comedy game show

- Genre: Comedy; Reality; Game show
- Presented by: Billy Eichner
- Country of origin: United States
- Original language: English
- No. of seasons: 5
- No. of episodes: 54

Production
- Production locations: New York City, New York, United States
- Production companies: Funny or Die; Lyft Entertainment (2018–19)

Original release
- Network: Fuse (2011–14) truTV (2015–17); Digital platforms (2018–2022)
- Release: December 18, 2011 – 2022

Billy on the Street with Billy Eichner is an American comedy game show hosted by comedian and actor Billy Eichner. During each episode, Eichner goes out to the streets of New York City and asks pedestrians questions about pop culture. Episodes often include guest stars, usually fellow actors or comedians. Recurring games include "For a Dollar" and "Quizzed in the Face". Eichner is also the executive producer and creator of the series.

The series premiered December 18, 2011 on Fuse and aired for three seasons. The fourth season, which premiered on October 8, 2015, and the fifth season, which premiered on November 15, 2016, aired on truTV. It was announced on September 21, 2017, that the show was leaving truTV and was actively searching for a new network. Select seasons are available through the truTV app, on demand, and website in the United States.

The show returned as short-form web episodes distributed by Funny or Die through various digital distribution platforms in September 2018 with Lyft as the presenting sponsor. A few promotional episodes were made in 2022 for Eichner's movie Bros, without Lyft sponsoring.

== Episodes ==
Season	Episodes	Originally released		
Season	Episodes	First released	Last released	Network
1	10	December 18, 2011	February 16, 2012	Fuse
2	12	December 7, 2012	March 8, 2013	Fuse
3	10	March 12, 2014	May 14, 2014	Fuse
4	10	October 8, 2015	December 31, 2015	TruTV
5	11	November 15, 2016	February 20, 2017	TruTV

=== Season 1 (2011–12) ===
No.	Title	Original release date
1	"And Away We Go..."	December 18, 2011
Games include: "For A Dollar", "Sho Nuff or no he Didn't" and "Where in the world is John Mayer's Penis"
2	"Are You Smarter Than a Gay Fifth Grader?"	December 22, 2011
Games include: "Are You Smarter Than a Gay Fifth Grader?" and "Is this a Real Tyler The Creator Lyric or not?"
3	"Can Rachel Dratch Name 20 White People in 30 Seconds?"	December 29, 2011
Games include: Premiere of "Quizzed in the Face", "Get In the Snuggie" with Rachel Dratch and "Amateur Speed Sketching" Special guest: Rachel Dratch
4	"The Meryl Streep Showdown"	January 5, 2012
Games include: "Quizzed in the Face", "For A Dollar" and "Missing Testicle or Extraterrestrial?"
5	"Ask an Asian!"	January 12, 2012
Games include: "Quizzed in the Face" with a secret twist, Premiere of "Cash Face" and Billy releases his inspired James Blunt inspired single "You Look Really Good For You"
6	"Where in the World Is Scarlett Johansson's Vagina?"	January 19, 2012
Games include: "Where in the world is Scarlett Johanson's Vagina" and "Sho Nuff or no he Didn't"
7	"Joan Rivers Gets Quizzed in the Face"	January 26, 2012
Games include: "Quizzed in the Face" with a special guest, and "Children's TV Show from the 80's or a Musician?" Special guest: Joan Rivers
8	"Drunk Rich"	February 2, 2012
Games include: "Quizzed in the Face", "Cash Face" and new game "Indian or not Indian?"
9	"Did You Hear Madonna Died?"	February 9, 2012
Games include: "Quizzed in the Face", "Did you hear Madonna Died?" and "Amateur Speed Sketching"
10	"Television Is the Greatest Thing to Ever Happen to Me!"	February 16, 2012
Games include: "Quizzed in the Face", "Rapper or Nic Cage Character?" and "British Person or Scientologist?" Special guest: Mark Hoppus

=== Season 2 (2012–13) ===
No.	Title	Original release date
11	"Name Three White People!"	December 7, 2012
Games include: "Black Eyes Peas or Black guy who peed", "Angry Turds" and "Dead or Boring" Special guest: Rashida Jones
12	"Scream for an American Girl Doll"	December 14, 2012
Games include: "Would Drew Barrymore like that?", "Scream for an American Girl Doll" and "Quizzed in the Face" Special guest: Will Ferrell
13	"Billy Meets Mr. Singh!"	December 21, 2012
Games include: "Train song or Mommy blog", "Chris Brown or Serial Killer", "Quizzed in the Face" and "Amateur Speed Sketching"
14	"The Lesbian Lightning Round"	January 4, 2013
Games include: "Quizzed in the Face", "Where in the World is Rihanna's Rihgina", and "New Year's Eve or Deformed" Special guest: Andy Cohen
15	"The Julia Robstacle Course"	January 18, 2013
Games include: "Julia Roberts-Themed Obstacle Course", "Would you Masturbate To Them?" and "Weekend at Bernies or Django Unchained" Special guest: Rachel Dratch
16	"Do You Think Gisele Bundchen Understands the Jokes on Portlandia?"	January 25, 2013
Games include: "Pretty or Liar", "Media Mogul or Rabbi" and "Quizzed in the Face" Special guest: Nas and Ashley Benson
17	"It's Spock - Do You Care?"	February 1, 2013
Games include: "Quizzed in the Face", "For A Dollar", "It Gets Better or Better Off Ted", "Billy's Fashion Review" and "Its Spock! Do You Care?" Special guest: Zachary Quinto and Julie Klausner
18	"Whistleblow That Jew!"	February 8, 2013
Games include: "Their Bodies, Themselves" and "Tyler Perry Movie Quote or Applebees" Special guest: Maya Rudolph and Rashida Jones
19	"It's Debra Messing, You Gays!"	February 15, 2013
Games include: "Katharine McPhee or Nanny McPhee?", "Lil' Quizzed in the Face", "Smash or Great Gatsby", "For A Dollar" and "It's Debra Messing, You Gays!" Special guest: Debra Messing and Christian Borle
20	"Billy in the Air!"	February 22, 2013
Games include: "Who Dat?", "Quizzed in the Face", "For A Dollar", "Pink, Meryl Streep, or Who Cares?", "The Price feels so Right" and "This or Talk to Mario Lopez" Special guest: P!nk
21	"The Humpty Hump!"	March 1, 2013
Games include: "For A Dollar", "Amateur Speed Sketching", "Gay or Not a Gay", "Space Craft or Reality Star", "Charlize, Tyrese, or Denise", "Feminine Product or ABC Family?" and "Kathy Bates or Gargamel" Special guest: Hank Azaria
22	"The Rally to Raise Awareness of Nicole Kidman"	March 8, 2013
Games include: "For A Dollar", "Quizzed in the Face", "Meredith Baxter Birney" and "Joseph Gordon-Levitt Pursuit"; Other segments: "Nicole Kidman Rally" and "Moments Never Seen" Special guest: Kristen Johnston

=== Season 3 (2014) ===
No.	Title	Original release date
23	"Olivia Wilde Is Pretty and You're All Disgusting!"	March 12, 2014
Games include: "Humpy Dumpy or Mary J Blige", "For A Dollar," "Quizzed in the Face", "Olivia Wilde is very pretty and you're all disgusting," "You can't do that on television, Adele Edition," "Lighting Round," "Twitter Questions" Special guest: Olivia Wilde
24	"Cash Cow"	March 19, 2014
Games include: "Steve Harvey or Harvey Milk", "For A Dollar", "Screaming Tweets", "Cash Cow", "Quizzed in the Face", "Tyler Perry or Art" and "HBO Girls or Berenstain Bears" Special guest: Lena Dunham
25	"Billy Destroys a Car"	March 26, 2014
Games include: "For A Dollar", "Racist or Vegetarian", "Quizzed in the Face", "How I Met Your Mother Lighting Round", "How I Met Your Mother Car Thrashing" and "Twitter Questions" Special guest: Neil Patrick Harris and Lindsay Lohan
26	"She Clucks or She Sucks?"	April 2, 2014
Games include: "She Clucks or She Sucks", "For A Dollar", "Would Lena Dunham F*** that Cartoon Character", "Quizzed in the Face", "The Vaginal Four", "Lighting Round" and "Twitter Questions" Special guest: Seth Meyers
27	"Would You Have Sex with Paul Rudd?"	April 9, 2014
Games include: "Would this disappoint Bill Cosby", "For A Dollar", "Quizzed in the Face", "Where does this Stephen King novel take place", "Would You Have Sex with Paul Rudd" and "Clueless or Childless" Special guest: Paul Rudd and Amy Poehler
28	"When the Easter Bunny Attacks!"	April 16, 2014
Games include: "BuzzFeed List or Schindler's List", "For A Dollar", "Quizzed in the Face", "Passion Of The Christ Lightnig Round", "Mo'lympics" and "Twitter Questions" Special guest: Joel McHale
29	"It's Not Pitbull, It's Amy Poehler"	April 23, 2014
Games include: "Chipmunk or Huxtable", "For A Dollar", "Quizzed in the Face", "Hope for Haiti or Jumanji", "That's not Pitbull, its Amy Poehler" and "Twitter Questions" Special guest: Amy Poehler
30	"Billy Loves Ratatouille"	April 29, 2014
Games include: "Queen Latifiah or Brave Person", "For a Dollar", "Thanks for Sharing Adam Levine", "Billy rants about Ratatouille", "Does Shakira know what that is" and "Meryl-Go-Round" Special guest: Patton Oswalt
31	"John Mayer or Pepé Le Pew?"	May 7, 2014
Games include: "John Mayer or Pepé Le Pew", "For a Dollar", "Quizzed In the Face", "Who is most famous on Sean Hayes phone", "Actress Potato Head" and "Uninteresting or Uncircumcised" Special guest: Sean Hayes and Olivia Wilde
32	"The Lana Del Race for the Cure"	May 14, 2014
Games include: "Lana del race for a cure", "For a Dollar", "Is this or Isn't this adorable", "She talented or she seems nice" and "Missed Moments" Special guest: Nick Offerman

=== Season 4 (2015) ===
No. overall	No. in season	Title	Original release date	U.S. viewers (millions)
33	1	"Billy Helps Tina Fey Find a Friend"	October 8, 2015	0.38
After feeling the pressure to list the names of Latino performers in one minute, Tina Fey widens her network by finding new pals around New York. Also: "Bob Dylan or a**l sex" and "The Lightning Round".
34	2	"For a Dollar, It's Chris Pratt!"	October 15, 2015	0.44
In a challenge about James Bond stars and cable networks, Billy puts Chris Pratt on the spot. Later, they ask bystanders if they know who Chris is in "The Lightning Round". Also: Quizzed in the Face.
35	3	"Anna Kendrick's "Tinder in Real Life" Lightning Round!"	October 22, 2015	N/A
Actress Anna Kendrick guesses Katy Perry's cat's interests, then helps Billy in his search for love by swiping right or left on real-life people. Also "Quizzed in the Face" with Elena and "Adam Sandler Movie or Gay Bar".
36	4	"Billy Plays "Is Beyoncé Scared of That?" with Jason Sudeikis!"	October 29, 2015	N/A
While discussing his films, Jason Sudeikis ruffles Billy's feathers and plays a game of "Is Beyonce Scared Of That?". Billy and Jason then rally a group of bros. Also: "Quizzed in the Face" and the Lightning Round.
37	5	"Shondaland!"	November 12, 2015	N/A
Bill Hader plays "Make That Noise" and "Streaming or Screaming". A man plays Amateur Speed Sketching and must draw Angelina Jolie. Actress Amy Sedaris tackles the Shondaland obstacle course.
38	6	"Billy's Thanksgiving Parade!"	November 19, 2015	N/A
Billy plays a guessing game about real and faux Macy's Thanksgiving Day Parade moments with Lucy Liu. New Yorkers give thanks to Meg Ryan. Billy hosts his own Thanksgiving Day Parade with Katie Couric. Also: "Mark Twain or Eddie Murphy".
39	7	"The Julianne Moore Acting Attack!"	December 3, 2015	N/A
After a very specific guessing game called "Hummus or Nipples?", Julianne Moore uses her acting skills to get tourist tips around Times Square. Other games include "Quizzed in the Face" with Elena and the Gospel Choir Lightning Round.
40	8	"Christmas on the Street with Will Ferrell!"	December 10, 2015	N/A
Rachel Dratch goes through a rigorous Scientology-inspired obstacle course. Will Ferrell and Billy try to find people well-versed in holiday movies in the Lightning Round. Other games include "Gay, Part-Black or Cokehead" and "Who Discovered this Person: Judd Apatow or P. Diddy?".
41	9	"Sex on the Street with Sarah Jessica Parker"	December 17, 2015	N/A
Sarah Jessica Parker gives out shoes with Billy in a special game of "For a Dollar" before guessing between reindeer names and sex apps. Other games include "Kevin Hart or Gabby Giffords" and "Hansel or Gretel", and Billy talks to New Yorkers about the new movie, The Chipmunks RoadChip.
42	10	"Elena vs. Her Sister"	December 31, 2015	N/A
Actress Julianna Margulies goes undercover as Sia for a game of "That's not Sia, it's Julianna Margulies!". Billy quizzes Elena and her sister, Edie, about each other. Lucy Liu participates in a game titled "We Have to See What Lucy Liu Thinks". Also: "Kris Jenner or Geppetto".

=== Season 5 (2016–17) ===
No. overall	No. in season	Title	Original release date	U.S. viewers (millions)
43	1	"Immigrant, or Real American? With Jon Hamm!"	November 15, 2016	0.254
Jon Hamm and Billy look for sexually adventurous people in a game called "Would You Have a Threesome with Me and Jon Hamm?". Billy asks an office manager to play "Immigrant or Real American?". Tina Fey plays "Man or Woman?". Also: Quizzed in the Face Express and The Lightning Round.
44	2	"Death Rogen, with Special Guest Seth Rogen!"	November 22, 2016	0.335
Comedian Seth Rogen guesses his movies based on interpretive dances in "Seth Vogue-en". Later, people give mixed reactions to the news of Seth's death in front of him in "Death Rogen". Also: "What does Michelle Rodriguez Bring to the Table?" and "The Billy on the Street Relay Race".
45	3	"Lupita Nyong'o: Bring the Pain"	November 29, 2016	0.233
Lupita Nyong'o joins Billy for a round of "Gay or Old" and plays "Barack Obama or Jennifer Lawrence?", and then hits the street for a special Lightning Round called "Lupita Nyong'o: Bring the Pain". Contestants fumble trying to sing patriotic tunes in "The Patriotic Tunes Lightning Round" featuring Elena. Tituss Burgess sings This Land is Your Land.
46	4	"Miracle on 34th Streep with Andy Samberg"	December 6, 2016	0.226
Andy Samberg plays "Was At My Wedding or Possibly Killed Tupac", then helps Billy rally for blockbuster franchises around lesser known characters with special appearances by Jon Hamm and Lupita Nyong'o. Also: "Fox News Anchor or Pilgrim", and Billy has New Yorkers pretend to have an animated squirrel on their shoulders.
47	5	"Aziz on the Street!"	December 13, 2016	0.219
Billy asks Aziz Ansari to pinpoint Kanye West quotes in "Is this a Kanye West Quote or Not?". Rachel Dratch gets plunged into an obstacle course where she must escape Margot Robbie's moment. Also: Aziz and Billy remind New Yorkers that it's the golden age of television in "The Lightning Round", and a tourist plays "James Franco or Real Gay Person?".
48	6	"Billy's Holiday Wonderland with Jacob Tremblay!"	December 20, 2016	0.268
Billy helps young actor Jacob Tremblay flaunt his fame on the street. Debra Messing returns for a special Christmas edition of "It's Debra Messing, You Gays!". A tourist from Utah plays "Match the Publicist to the Client". Billy visits unique holiday displays in "Billy's Holiday Window Wonderland".
49	7	"Do Gay People Care About John Oliver? with John Oliver!"	January 3, 2017	0.194
John Oliver hits the street with Billy to find out if gay people care about him in "Do Gay People Care About John Oliver?", then plays a different version of whack-a-mole called "Whack-a-Joel". Elena joins Billy to talk to pedestrians about the new Star Wars film, Rogue One. Also, Billy asks New Yorkers to pay tribute to the TV series "Bones" in "A Farewell to Bones".
50	8	"Curbside Conga Line with James Corden"	January 10, 2017	0.287
Billy heads to Los Angeles to play "Artistic Masterpiece or something Justin Timberlake's Music Reminds Me Of" with James Corden. Later, Billy and James ask people on the streets of Los Angeles to help Billy create his own viral segment in "Curbside Conga Line". Also: Billy encounters a protest against him and his show; "Taraji Jim Henson", and Robin Lord Taylor runs through the "Can You Separate the Art from the Artist" obstacle course.
51	9	"Super Sloppy Semi-Automatic Double Dare! With Keegan-Michael Key"	January 17, 2017	0.219
Under pressure, Keegan-Michael Key attempts to name ten famous gay people. Later, he is subjected to an obstacle course where he must find weapons in "Super Sloppy Semi-Automatic Double Dare". Also: "Give It Up for Kate Hudson" and "The Walking Dead or The Talking Dead?".
52	10	"The NY Bubble with Stephen Colbert!"	January 24, 2017	0.174
Stephen Colbert plays a game of "La La Land or Nicki Minaj", and then joins Billy to ask New Yorkers for their messages to President Trump and about living in the New York Bubble. Elena joins Billy to answer fans' Twitter questions. Also: "Melissa McCarthy or My Niece at Chuck-E-Cheese?".
53	11	"Political Comedy!"	February 20, 2017	0.215

== Accolades ==
Year	Award	Category	Nominee(s)	Result	Ref.
2013	Daytime Emmy Awards	Outstanding Game Show Host	Billy Eichner	Nominated	
2015	Primetime Emmy Awards	Outstanding Short-Format Live-Action Entertainment Program	Billy on the Street with First Lady Michelle Obama, Big Bird and Elena!!!	Nominated	
2016	Webby Awards	Online Film & Video: Comedy, Individual Short or Episode	Billy on the Street with First Lady Michelle Obama, Big Bird and Elena!!!	Won	
2017	Primetime Emmy Awards	Outstanding Variety Sketch Series	Billy on the Street	Nominated	
2019	Primetime Emmy Awards	Outstanding Short Form Variety Series	Billy on the Street	Nominated	

== Russian version ==
On the Russian Che channel there started a local version named Begushchy Kosar (lit. The Running Thousand) in which host Alexey Zhirov gives 1000 rubles for the right answer.
