= Ze Frank =

American online performance artist (born 1971)

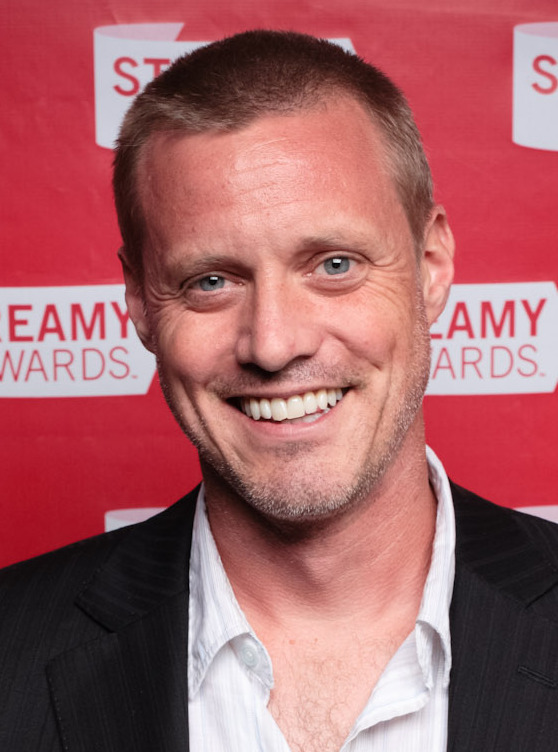
- Frank at the 2010 Streamy Awards
- Born: Hosea Jan Frank; Guilderland, New York, U.S.
- Education: Brown University
- Known for: Comedy
- Notable work: the show, a show, True Facts
- Spouse: Jody Brandt (2003–present)
- Parent: Joachim Frank
- Website: zefrank.com

Hosea Jan "Ze" Frank (/ˈzeɪ/) is an American online performance artist, composer, humorist, and public speaker based in Los Angeles, California.

== Personal life ==
Frank was born to German-American parents and raised in a suburb of Albany, New York. His father is Chemistry Nobel Laureate Joachim Frank. He has a sister, who is a painter, as was indicated in his series the show with zefrank.

Frank was educated at a Montessori school, known for its constructivist teaching methods, and graduated with a B.S. in neuroscience from Brown University in 1995. At the university, he played guitar and sang lead vocals for a funk/jam band called Dowdy Smack, along with Blues Traveler bassist Tad Kinchla, until its dissolution in 1998.

In 2003, Frank married his longtime girlfriend Jody Brandt, whom he had met at Brown University. Brandt is a licensed psychologist.

At the end of 2008, Frank and his wife Jody moved from Brooklyn Heights, in New York City, to Westwood, in Los Angeles.

Frank was listed as second author on a paper published in The Journal of Neuroscience, which was featured briefly in episode 21 of a show, on May 25, 2012, called My Pupils, explaining that his study of neuroscience of vision was motivated by his harmless anisocoria condition.

== Career ==
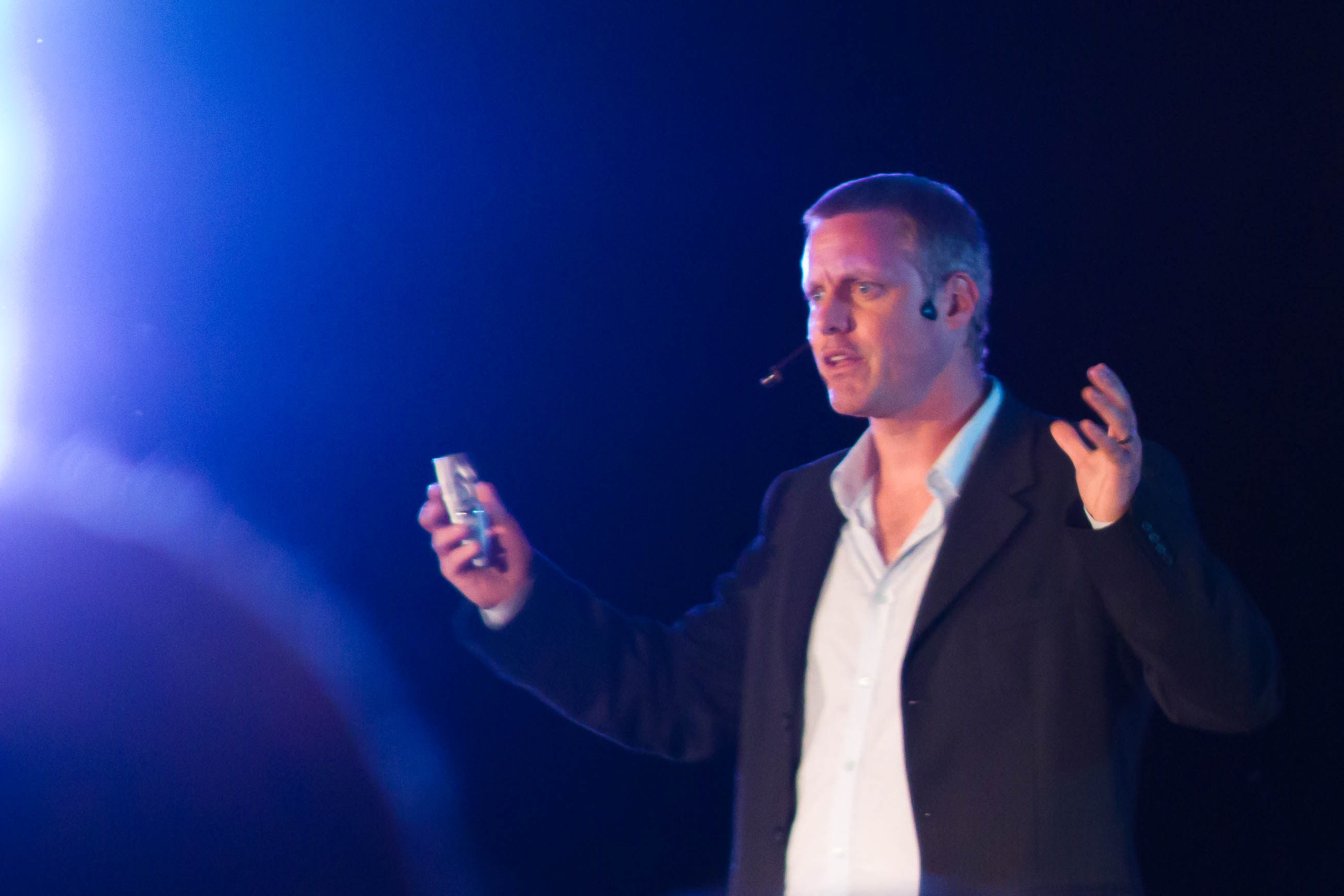
Frank at VidCon 2010

In 2001, Frank created an online birthday invitation and sent it to seventeen of his closest friends. Forwarded wildly, the invitation soon generated millions of hits and over 100 gigabytes of daily web traffic to Frank's personal website. The site grew to include interactive group projects, short films, animations, and video games, many Flash-based, including children's educational videos featuring handy tips such as "Don't vacuum your face."

Frank won a 2002 Webby Award for Personal Website (People's Voice) and in 2005, he was featured in Time's "50 Coolest Websites." Frank debuted onstage at Mark Hurst's first annual Gel conference in 2003. In 2006, his YouTube channel "zefrank1" was created, which hosts the popular True Facts series. He has spoken for many years at TED Conferences, with presentations in 2004, 2005, 2008, 2010, and 2014.

Frank has served as an adjunct professor at ITP/NYU, Parsons School of Design, and SUNY Purchase.

Discussing his work in the digital medium, and the potential of new platforms like Facebook, YouTube, and Twitter, Frank said, "For me, experimentation is not about the technology. In an ever-changing technological landscape, where today's platforms are not tomorrow's platforms, the key seems to be that any one of these spaces can use a dose of humanity and art and culture."

Frank was formerly the president of BuzzFeed Motion Pictures, and from January 2018 he served as the chief research and development officer for the company. By April 2019 Frank left BuzzFeed.

As of December 4, 2024, Frank is a member of the Advisory Board of the Senckenberg Ocean Species Alliance, a Frankfurt-based project with a mission to revolutionize the description and naming of marine invertebrates. In 2025, a chiton species named after him, Craspedochiton zefranki, was described. Then the viewers were able to vote on a new species name for another species of chiton (Ferreiraella populi).

== the show ==
the show with zefrank
- Genre: comedy, current events.

Cast and voices
- Hosted by: Ze Frank

Technical specifications
- Picture format: .flv, .mov, .mp4

Publication
- Original release: March 17, 2006 – March 17, 2007
- Updates: Weekdays

On March 17, 2006, Frank launched the daily video program the show with zefrank. The format of the program combined commentary on media and current events with viewer contributions and activities. Each tightly edited three-to-five-minute episode combined Daily Show-style commentary on world events with songs, observations, and occasional games or challenges for his viewers to participate in. Thousands of photos, videos, and music files were contributed by the audience, including over 1,000 photos in one 20-hour period. The show appeared each weekday until its final episode on March 17, 2007, exactly one year after its start. Following the success of the show, Frank signed with the United Talent Agency of Beverly Hills, California for representation. The Show's style has influenced many popular video bloggers today, such as the Vlogbrothers.

In October 2013, Frank posted the entire library of the show episodes on YouTube, having removed them several weeks earlier from previous host blip.tv. The entire catalog was also available for purchase from his web-store at zefrank.com.

== a show ==
a show with zefrank
- Genre: comedy, current events

Cast and voices
- Hosted by: Ze Frank

Publication
- Original release: April 9, 2012 – November 14, 2013

On February 27, 2012, Ze Frank announced that he was going to do a thrice-weekly show, that will be "same same but different" from the show. Similar to his other projects, Frank's new venture would be a collaboration between him and his audience. The new show, titled "a show" was funded by a Kickstarter campaign that raised $146,752 in eleven days. It debuted on April 9, 2012, with an episode titled "An Invocation for Beginnings". Animated dreams (short animations built around audio submitted by viewers of 'a show') were a regular weekly feature. Eight months later, with the release of the "Body Karaoke" episode on November 30, 2012, "a show" and its related collaborative efforts, including "projects" and "missions" went on unannounced hiatus. No official announcement has been made regarding the status of "a show" or whether series production would resume.

On January 12 and 13, 2013, Frank hosted a public participatory showcase event at the Santa Cruz Museum of Art and History in Santa Cruz, California, entitled "Ze Frank Weekend", featuring hands-on workshops and activities, exhibits related to "a show", and the results of collaborative "projects" and "missions" developed between April and November of the previous year.

The show continued to run on the YouTube channel "zefrankenfriends" until November 2013.

== True Facts ==
In December 2012, Ze Frank released a video titled "True Facts About Baby Echidnas" that featured footage of echidnas and a voiceover by Frank including facts and reactions to the video footage, which has been viewed over 10 million times. Frank later released other videos in the series focusing on animals including "True Facts About the Octopus" which has been viewed over 13 million times, and one video which instead focused on actor Morgan Freeman titled "True Facts About Morgan Freeman" which was viewed over 12 million times. After a hiatus spanning over 3 years, Ze Frank continued the "True Facts" series with an episode titled "True Facts about the Frogfish" on April 24, 2018, and maintained regular uploads in the series afterwards.

== Other media appearances ==
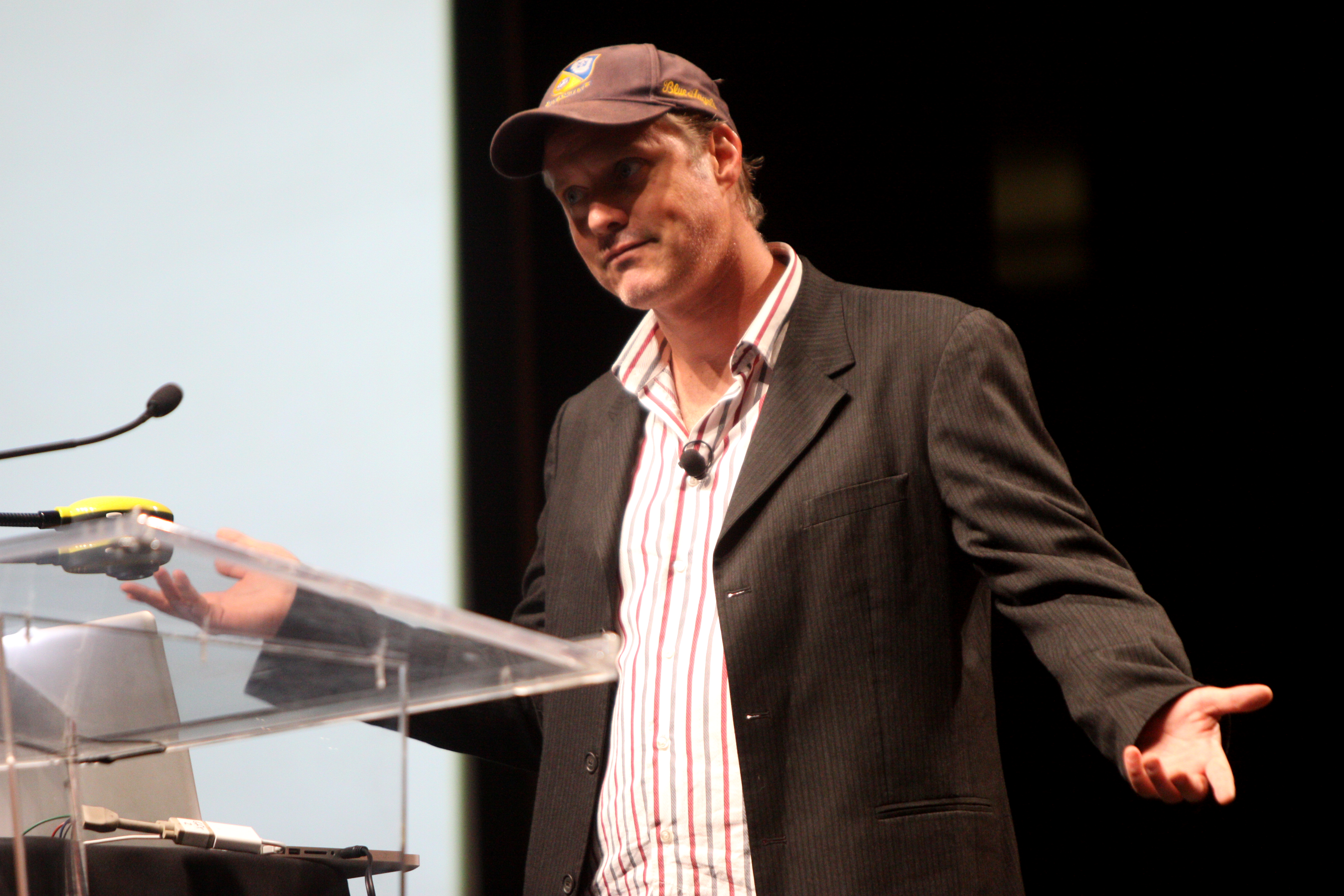
Frank at VidCon 2012

- In February 2004 Frank appeared on the TED Conference with a talk titled "What's so funny about the Web?"
- On May 18, 2007, Frank spoke at the Ruby on Rails conference in Portland, Oregon.
- Frank was a substitute host on the July 23, 2007, edition of the PRI public radio show Fair Game with Faith Salie.
- Frank spoke at Rochester Institute of Technology as part of the monthly Caroline Werner Gannett Lecture Series on October 3, 2007.
- In March 2008, Frank MCed the Graphex Gala Awards Ceremony in Vancouver, British Columbia, Canada.
- Frank was a featured guest on The Sound of Young America on July 17, 2008.
- On April 11, 2011, Frank hosted an online streaming benefit concert with Imogen Heap to raise funds and inform viewers regarding the plight of the Japanese people following the devastating earthquake and tsunami. Frank conducted interviews with experts such as James Kondo, adviser to the Japanese Prime Minister, and architect Mark Dytham, as well as an assortment of musicians including Amanda Palmer, Ben Folds, Jamie Cullum, Imogen Heap, and KT Tunstall. The event was called Live 4 Sendai (part of the Live 4 X series) and it raised funds for UNICEF, The Red Cross, and Oxfam to further their restorative efforts in the region.
- In 2012, Frank once again attended VidCon, performing briefly onstage.
- Frank voices the popular Dear Kitten Friskies videos.
