= The show with zefrank =

Web series

the show with zefrank
- Genre: comedy, current events

Cast and voices
- Hosted by: Ze Frank

Technical specifications
- Picture format: .flv, .mov, .mp4

Publication
- Original release: March 17, 2006 – March 17, 2007
- Updates: Weekdays

Related
- Website: http://www.zefrank.com/theshow

the show with zefrank is a web video show by Ze Frank that was produced each weekday from March 17, 2006 until March 17, 2007. The format of the program combined commentary on media and current events with viewer contributions and activities. the show is considered a pioneering development to the vlogging genre, notably in its usage of elements that would become commonplace in later vlogging culture. It also served as inspiration for many popular vloggers, including the Vlogbrothers, Philip DeFranco and Wheezy Waiter. It was the subject of articles in Slate, The New York Times, the Los Angeles Times, The Guardian, and Newsweek.

== Format ==
Episodes of the show run from two to three minutes in length. Topics range from serious socio-political commentary to absurdist comedy and running gags. One such gag was to open episodes with outlandish skits, followed by the question "Are the new viewers gone yet?" Another gag involved musical performances of original songs to emphasize a point or concept in the episode.

Thousands of photos, videos and music files were contributed by the audience, including over 1,000 photos in one 20-hour period. Viewer feedback from a previous show, a segment he called "S-s-s-somethin' from the comments," often served as a launching point to a new topic. One episode was scripted by thousands of viewers using a wiki.

On the May 16, 2006 episode, Ze challenged his viewers to create an "Earth Sandwich." The goal was to place two pieces of bread on the ground at points directly opposite each other on the globe, creating a giant sandwich between the two pieces of bread. The task was completed by brothers Duncan and Jon Rawlinson in Spain and Morgan in New Zealand.

== Ending ==
The show concluded on March 17, 2007, as planned. Ze's final words to his viewers were "thanks so much for an amazing year."

Ze did a five-year 'replay' podcast in 2011 where he posted commentary while watching episodes of 'the show'. Episodes of this podcast are still available online on YouTube.

== See also ==
- a show with Ze Frank
