= Abyssochitonidae =

Scientific classification
- Kingdom: Animalia
- Phylum: Mollusca
- Class: Polyplacophora
- Order: Lepidopleurida
- Family: Abyssochitonidae

Synonyms
- Ferreiraellidae; Xylochitonidae

Family of molluscs

Abyssochitonidae is a family of chitons belonging to the order Lepidopleurida. This family is monotypic with Abyssochiton and Xylochiton being junior synonyms of Ferreiraella.

== Taxonomy ==
Genera:

- Ferreiraella Sirenko, 1988
