= Deep-sea wood =

Wood sunk to the sea floor

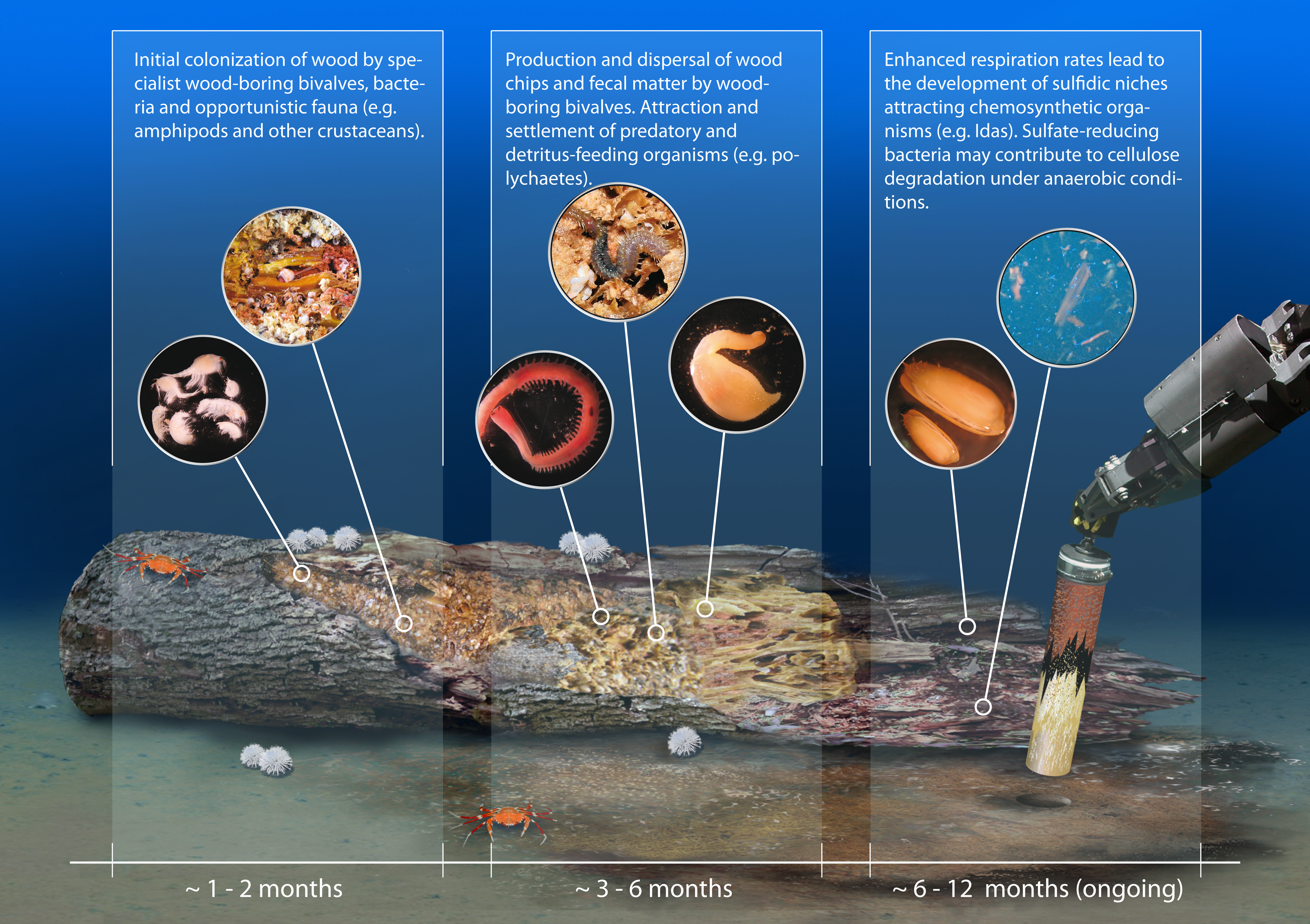
Image showing the succession of organisms as time goes on.

Deep-sea wood is the term for wood which sinks to the ocean floor. These wood-falls develop deep sea ecosystems. Deep-sea wood supports unique forms of deep sea community life including chemo-synthetic bacteria. Sources of carbon for these deep sea ecosystems are not limited to sunken wood, but also include kelp and the remains of whales. Much of what is known about deep-sea wood is obtained from experiments by marine biologists, in which wood is forced to the bottom of the ocean for a set amount of time and is then collected later for sampling.

== Organisms present ==
=== Wood boring bivalves ===
Colonization experiments revealed the presence of wood boring bivalves that belong to the subfamily Xylophagainae, such as Xylophaga dorsalis, or other species recently described from deep-sea canyons. They range in shell size from 1 to 10 mm (0.04 to 0.4 in). These bivalves are able to digest wood with the help of symbiotic bacteria in their gills.

=== Chemosyntheic fauna ===
Chemosyntheic mussels identified as Idas modiolaeformis were also found in deep sea wood when organic matter settled for at least one year. They are slightly smaller than the bivalves found and range in length from 1 to 6 mm (0.04 to 0.2 in).

=== Other organisms ===
A variety of deep-sea crabs and sea urchins seemed to also be chemically attracted to the wood. There are numerous species of snail that have been discovered on the wood, along with predatory worms and small crustaceans. Their attraction to the wood may be attributed to its bacterial inhabitants serving as a base organism for deep-sea life, with the potential to feed on microorganisms, or other inhabitants of the wood.

== Fungal communities ==
Fungi are the major degraders of lignocellulose in aquatic environments. In aerobic terrestrial environments, a majority of cellulose breakdown is broken down by wood-decay fungi commonly and collectively known as white rot and soft rot. Complex enzymes are secreted by the various fungi, converting cellulose into a carbon form that can be used by the fungus, and subsequently any organism up the food chain.

== Bacterial communities ==
Bacteria also contribute to the digestion of deep-sea wood, using an alternative method from that of fungi. In order to classify bacteria present on deep-sea wood, a variety of different techniques are employed. First, biomass allows scientists to quantify the amount of bacterial growth on a sample. Then DNA extraction and Automated Ribosomal Intergenic Spacer analysis (ARISA) can be used to identify the strains of bacteria present that are most dominant, and the ones that are present.

While Gammaproteobacteria dominated the composition of bacteria found on freshly submerged wood, many other bacterial strains populated in response to colonization of the aforementioned wood-boring Xylophaga, which take the large chunks of wood and convert them into fine chips and fecal matter. These processed forms of carbon lead to the growth of many other marine bacteria including Alphaproteobacteria, Flavobacteria, Actinobacteria, Clostridia, and Bacteroidetes.

=== Wood degradation ===
==== Presence of anaerobes ====
The presence of Clostridia, obligate anaerobes suggests that the process of degrading the deep-sea wood may create oxygen-free environments for these bacteria to survive in.

==== Sulfur reducing bacteria ====
Many bacterial strains that were found on deep-sea wood were sulfur-reducing bacteria, meaning they obtain energy from reducing elemental sulfur, instead of traditionally using the sun for energy like almost all other organisms. Marine biologists suggest they may contribute to the breakdown of cellulose from the wood.

== Variability of organisms ==
The species of wood that falls to the ocean floor produces variability in the organisms present on it. There is also natural viability between organisms found on the same species of tree, which promotes to deep-sea diversity. In fact, a study by marine biologists showed bacterial communities were approximately 75% dissimilar, even as similar logs of the same tree species were placed within the same 500 m^{2} (0.12-acre) area.
