= More Information Than You Require =

Book by John Hodgman

- 2008 front cover
- Author: John Hodgman
- Language: English, Arabic
- Publisher: Dutton
- Publication date: October 21, 2008
- Publication place: United States
- Media type: Print (Hardcover) & Audiobook (CD)
- Pages: 240
- ISBN: 978-0-525-95034-9
- OCLC: 223800528
- Dewey Decimal: 818/.5402 22
- LC Class: PN6165 .H65 2008
- Preceded by: The Areas of My Expertise
- Followed by: That Is All

More Information Than You Require is a 2008 satirical almanac by John Hodgman. It is the follow-up to Hodgman's 2005 book The Areas of My Expertise. It was released October 21, 2008. The full title reads:

For Your Consideration, The Firms of Dutton & Riverhead Books Present in the English Language: A Further Compendium of Complete World Knowledge in "The Areas Of My Expertise," Assembled and Illumined by Me, John Hodgman, A Famous Minor Television Personality, Offering More Information Than You Require On Subjects as Diverse as: The Past (as There Is Always More of It), The Future (as There Is Still Some Left), All of the Presidents of the United States, The Secrets of Hollywood, Gambling, The Sport of the Asthmatic Man (Including: Hermit-Crab Racing), Strange Encounters with Aliens, How to Buy a Computer, How to Cook an Owl, and Most Other Subjects

More Information Than You Require is the second part of a trilogy, concluding with That Is All in 2011. This series of books is intended to be a collective whole, featuring continuous page numbering - that is, the last page of The Areas of My Expertise is page 236, and the first page of More Information Than You Require is page 237. The cover features John Hodgman holding a ferret, a reference to one of the "long cons" from The Areas of My Expertise.

== Reception ==
More Information was well received. The now-defunct Express called it an "enjoyable" follow-up to The Areas of My Expertise. Other reviewers positively noted the book's "bizarre" sense of humor.

== The 700 Mole-men Project ==
Analogously to the 700 Hoboes Project, Hodgman began a second illustration project for the 700 "Mole-manic Names" contained in More Information Than You Require. The website and Flickr group began accepting submissions on October 21, 2008.
