= Julie Klausner =

American writer

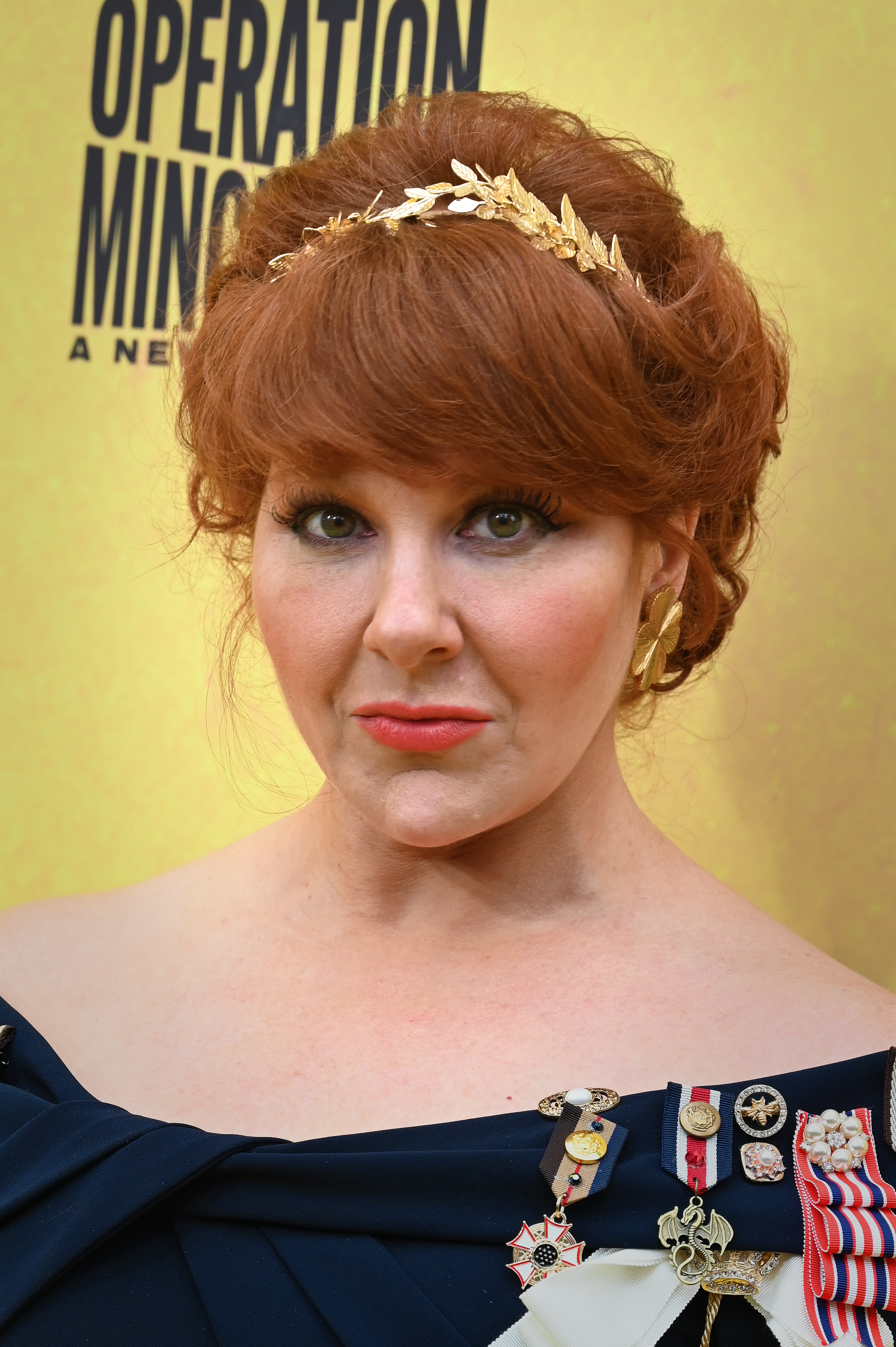
- Klausner in 2025
- Born: July 3, 1978 (age 48)
- Education: New York University
- Occupations: Writer; comedian; actress
- Years active: 1998–present

Julie Klausner (born July 3, 1978) is an American writer, comedian, actress, and podcaster. She is best known for creating, writing, and starring in the Hulu sitcom Difficult People (2015–2017), which also starred comedian Billy Eichner.

== Early life ==
Klausner was born on July 3, 1978, and grew up in Scarsdale, New York. She is a graduate of New York University and studied at the Upright Citizens Brigade and the School of Visual Arts. Klausner is Jewish.

== Career ==
As an adult, Klausner was the creator, writer, and co-star of the Hulu sitcom Difficult People, which also starred comedian Billy Eichner. Produced by Amy Poehler, the series debuted on August 5, 2015, running for three seasons before being cancelled in 2017. All 28 episodes remain available on the streaming service.

Klausner is head writer and co-executive producer of the Web series Billy on the Street, also starring Eichner, which had previously run on Funny or Die, Fuse, and TruTV and now premieres on Lyft's website and YouTube. Klausner has also written for television shows such as Mulaney, Best Week Ever, The Big Gay Sketch Show, The Jack and Triumph Show, Ugly Americans, and Saturday Night Live, as well as for pop culture websites such as The Awl and Vulture.

As an actor, Klausner has appeared in several comedy series in addition to Difficult People, such as Netflix's Big Mouth and TruTV's At Home with Amy Sedaris, and as Cheryl in Emmy and Golden Globe Award-winning FX miniseries Fosse/Verdon.

In October 2011, NBC picked up a pilot based on the Sue Margolis novel Apocalipstick, about a woman's father who dates her high-school nemesis, which Klausner was to write and serve as executive producer. In March 2018, it was announced Klausner would co-star in the NBC comedy pilot So Close, about two hopeless romantics unaware they live only blocks apart and may be soulmates. Neither program was picked up for series.

In March 2020, Klausner joined the writing staff of Amazon Prime Video's revival of the sketch comedy show Kids in the Hall. She is also a writer on the Apple TV+ musical comedy series Schmigadoon! which stars Cecily Strong. In 2021 she lent her voice to a gargoyle in a season three episode of What We Do in the Shadows, alongside “Difficult People” co-star Cole Escola.

=== Podcast ===
In March 2011, Klausner debuted her comedy and interview podcast How Was Your Week with Julie Klausner. In 2012, Rolling Stone featured the podcast on its list of 10 Best Comedy Podcasts of the Moment. As of May 2020, nearly 250 episodes had been produced.

In March 2020, Klausner and comedian-author Tom Scharpling premiered their podcast Double Threat, which they cohost on the Forever Dog network.

In March 2022, Klausner debuted her solo advice podcast "Ask Julie" on the Forever Dog Plus network.

=== Books ===
Klausner's first book, I Don't Care About Your Band, was released in February 2010 by Gotham/Penguin Books. In July 2010, Will Ferrell and Adam McKay's production company Gary Sanchez Productions optioned the book for HBO. Lizzy Caplan was attached to star and co-produce. In 2013, Klausner published her first young adult novel, titled Art Girls Are Easy.

== Music ==
In 2010 Klausner was part of a comedy duo act along with actor Sue Galloway called "Free to Be (You and Me)". They released a pastiche song called "Boys and Girls Are Different (In the Pants)." Later that year Klausner released the song "Center of Attention."

In 2023 Klausner released the song "Silence", a parody of the music of Kate Bush sung from the point of view of the character Clarice from the film The Silence of the Lambs.
