= That Is All (book) =

2011 satirical almanac by John Hodgman

- Author: John Hodgman
- Language: English
- Publisher: Dutton
- Publication date: November 1, 2011
- Publication place: United States
- Media type: Print (Hardcover)
- Pages: 368
- ISBN: 978-0-525-95244-2
- LC Class: PN6165 .H656 2011
- Preceded by: More Information Than You Require

That Is All is a 2011 satirical almanac by John Hodgman. It is the follow-up to Hodgman's 2008 book More Information Than You Require. It was released November 1, 2011.

That Is All is the third and final part of a trilogy of "COMPLETE WORLD KNOWLEDGE". The trilogy is a collective whole, featuring continuous page numbering – that is, the last page of The Areas of My Expertise is page 236, and the first page of More Information Than You Require is page 237. "That Is All" starts at page 607.

One of the book's topics is preparation for the upcoming end of the world. Each page includes a fictionalized calendar of events leading to the end of the world on December 21, 2012. Hodgman refers to this time as Ragnarök. The book's other topics include sports, wine, and a list of seven hundred ancient and unspeakable gods.
