= Antisemitism at Columbia University =

Columbia University in New York City has been the site of instances of antisemitism—or hostility to, prejudice towards, or discrimination against Jews—from the early 20th century to the present. In the 1920s and 1930s, Columbia imposed quotas that restricted Jewish enrollment, facing criticism for rejecting prominent applicants such as Richard Feynman and Jonas Salk. University president Nicholas Murray Butler also drew controversy for hosting Nazi Germany’s ambassador Hans Luther in 1933, describing him as a representative of “the government of a friendly people.” In the 1940s, the American Jewish Congress filed complaints alleging that Columbia’s admissions and employment practices violated New York’s anti‑discrimination laws, and its president Stephen S. Wise sought to revoke the university’s tax‑exempt status on similar grounds.

In the early 21st century, discourse surrounding the Israeli–Palestinian conflict has led to renewed reports of antisemitism. Following the October 7 attacks on Israel and outbreak of the Gaza war, alleged incidents of antisemitism increased on campus, with many alleged to have been perpetrated by participants in the pro-Palestinian campus protests and the Gaza Solidarity Encampment. In response, on November 1, 2023 the presidents of Columbia University, Barnard College, and Teachers College announced a Task Force on Antisemitism co-chaired by Esther Fuchs, Nicholas Lemann, and David Schizer. It did not initially define antisemitism, but later published a working definition of antisemitism in August 2024: "prejudice, discrimination, hate, or violence directed at Jews, including Jewish Israelis. Antisemitism can manifest in a range of ways, including as ethnic slurs, epithets, and caricatures; stereotypes; antisemitic tropes and symbols; Holocaust denial; targeting Jews or Israelis for violence or celebrating violence against them; exclusion or discrimination based on Jewish identity or ancestry or real or perceived ties to Israel; and certain double standards applied to Israel."

Between March 2024 and December 2025, Columbia University’s Task Force on Antisemitism issued four reports assessing campus climate and policy. The first criticized enforcement of demonstration rules, and noted that certain protest chants such as "globalize the intifada" were perceived as threatening by Jewish students. The second, drawing on interviews with 500 students, described pervasive antisemitism across clubs, classrooms, and dormitories, including harassment, hostile faculty remarks, and targeting of religious practices, and urged urgent action. The third presented survey findings that Jewish students felt markedly less accepted than peers and were wary of expressing views on the Israel–Hamas conflict, highlighting widespread discomfort in 2023–24. The fourth focused on classroom experiences, concluding that Jewish and Israeli students were often singled out or blamed for political issues, and identifying a lack of ideological diversity in Middle East studies, where faculty were described as having predominantly anti-Zionist viewpoints.

Critics of characterizations of the protest movement on campus as antisemitic—including scholars, journalists, and activists—have described them as exploiting the accusation of antisemitism to silence criticism of Israel. Others have countered that Jewish students reported experiencing ostracism and harassment that, if directed at other groups on campus, would generally be considered unacceptable.

In the spring of 2025, citing widespread antisemitism at Columbia, the Trump administration cut US$400 million in federal funding to the university and detained and attempted to deport Palestinian student activists, while the US House Committee on Education and Workforce ran a Title VI investigation into the allegations of antisemitism at the university. In July 2025, the board of trustees of the university settled with the Trump administration, agreeing to pay $200 million, adopt the IHRA definition of antisemitism, and accept other demands made by the Trump administration. As part of the settlement, Columbia also established a claims fund worth $21 million for Jewish employees reporting that they experienced antisemitism at the university and announced a partnership with the Anti Defamation League.

== 20th century ==
=== 1900s ===
In 1907, The New York Times reported on a mass meeting of Jewish students at the university. The newspaper reported that, among Jewish students, there was a widespread belief that the meeting's underlying purpose was to organize a response to what some regarded as discriminatory practices against Jewish students within Columbia’s social and literary societies. At the meeting, a student raised discrimination against Jews by the university Greek letter fraternities. The newspaper reported on expressed concerns of Jewish students about perceived discrimination in campus publications, noting that none of the editors of the student newspaper, the Columbia Daily Spectator, were Jewish, and that only one Jewish editor served on the staff of the university’s literary magazine, the Columbia Monthly.

=== 1920s ===
In 1920, Columbia University had a 40% Jewish enrollment rate according to Oliver Pollak. Around this time, Columbia imposed quotas on Jewish students to restrict the number of Jews, a practice that quickly expanded to many other prominent American universities.

The process of implementing these quotas began with new requirements to live in on-campus dormitories and new limitations on scholarships. Since a majority of Jewish students in the early 20th century came from impoverished families, many lived at home in order to save money, meaning that this new policy made attending Columbia much more difficult. According to Mark Oppenheimer, Columbia also began to conduct admissions interviews, during which university representatives would detect accents or other signs of Jewish origin for candidates whose surnames were not obviously Jewish. In the years 1920 to 1922, elite Protestant students began to abandon Columbia because of how the campus culture shifted after the number of Jewish students had been halved.

=== 1930s ===
During the 1930s, Columbia rejected both Richard Feynman and Jonas Salk due to their unofficial quotas on Jewish students. Feynman and Salk would instead attend MIT and CCNY respectively.

In November 1933, six months after the beginning of Nazi book burnings, President of Columbia Nicholas Murray Butler invited German Ambassador to the United States Hans Luther to speak at the university. Butler rebuked calls from the student body to cancel the speech by claiming that the request to do so would be a surrender to "illiberal theories" and was contrary to academic freedom. Butler also claimed that Luther was entitled to respect from the students of Columbia because he was a representative of "the government of a friendly people".

In March 1934, Jewish students at Columbia held a dance for Purim in John Jay Hall, at which eggs were thrown and a large swastika banner was unfurled by unknown student vandals who chanted "Down with the Jews."

In June 1936, Butler expelled Robert Burke, President-elect of his class, for his participation in a protest against Columbia's involvement in celebrating the 550th anniversary of Heidelberg University. Burke and other students had been critical of the ceremony because of its close involvement with the Nazi regime and the attendance of Nazi propaganda minister Joseph Goebbels.

Quotas on Jewish students led to a major decline in the percentage of Jewish students between 1920 and 1940 in a number of schools. Jewish students had made up 46.94% of all students at Columbia University College of Physicians and Surgeons, falling to 6.45% after quotas.

=== 1940s ===
In March 1946, Stephen S. Wise, president of the American Jewish Congress, petitioned the New York City Tax Commissioner to revoke Columbia University’s tax‑exempt status, alleging that the institution violated state law by admitting students on the basis of racial and religious criteria rather than academic merit. Wise argued that such practices meant Columbia could not be considered a nonsectarian educational institution under the law. Columbia’s acting president, Frank D. Fackenthal, denied the charges, stating that no discriminatory policies were in place. Wise argued that the university discriminated against Jewish, black and Italian students.

In June 1946, the American Jewish Congress filed a complaint with the New York State Fair Employment Practices Commission alleging that the University’s placement bureau used application forms that contravened state anti‑discrimination laws. The forms reportedly required candidates to disclose details such as nationality, race, place of birth, and religion, categories which were prohibited under New York law. The Congress argued that these practices amounted to unlawful discrimination in the university’s hiring process. In February 1947, University was compelled to comply with New York’s Ives‑Quinn anti‑discrimination law following the complaint. The State Commission Against Discrimination rejected Columbia’s claim that its placement bureau was exempt, establishing a precedent that employment offices operated by educational and charitable institutions must adhere to anti‑bias regulations. Columbia subsequently agreed to remove the contested questions from its application materials.

=== 1950s ===
In the 1950s the Jewish Telegraphic Agency reported on discriminatory practice among fraternities, permitted to exclude Jewish students and others on the basis of race, religion or colour. In 1953, Columbia set a deadline of October 1960 for all its fraternities to comply with a ban ending the discriminatory practices.

=== 1990s ===
In October 1995, the Columbia Daily Spectator published an antisemitic column by a senior student. In the controversial column, which The New York Times reported on, the student wrote: "I single out Jews because their oppression of blacks cannot go unnoticed while they disguise their evilness under the skirts and costumes of the Rabbi," A number of Jewish students called for a boycott of the newspaper.

== 21st century ==
=== 2000s ===
==== Columbia Unbecoming ====
A group of pro-Israel students at Columbia, along with the pro-Israel campus group The David Project, produced the 2004 film Columbia Unbecoming about three professors some students and faculty thought were biased against Israel. The film presents interviews with some students and the campus Jewish chaplain Rabbi Charles Sheer about professors in the department of Middle East and Asian Languages and Cultures (MEALAC)—mainly George Saliba, Joseph Massad, and Hamid Dabashi—whom they described as biased against Israel and whom they accused of misconduct. Massad said the episodes concerning him did not take place and that none of the people in the film had been students of his, describing the film project as a "witch-hunt." Saliba too denied that the episode concerning him happened as described in the film. Critics of the film called the film "propaganda" and described it as part of a "smear campaign" against professors critical of Israel. Pro-Israel figures such as Anthony Weiner called for Columbia to fire Massad, describing him as unfit to teach.

Following an investigation by an ad‑hoc faculty committee, a 2005 report concluded that there was no evidence to support allegations of antisemitism against Professor Joseph Massad. The committee did, however, find that in one classroom exchange he had “exceeded commonly accepted bounds” in his treatment of a student in a course on Palestinian and Israeli politics. Regarding alleged instances of intimidation from the school year 2001 to 2002, it found the allegations of two students against Massad to be "credible". According to The Brown Daily Herald, the ad-hoc committee found an account in which Massad allegedly responded to a student asking about Israeli military leaflets and warnings by yelling "If you're going to deny the atrocities being committed against the Palestinian people then you can get out of my classroom," to be plausible.

The American Jewish Committee welcomed the report's finding of no evidence of antisemitism said Columbia must "remain vigilant to ensure that Jewish students are protected and that complaints of bias are taken seriously." Abraham Foxman of the Anti Defamation League lamented the report, saying it did not adequately address the hostile climate Jewish students had experienced.

==== Ahmadinejad speech ====
In September 2007, Mahmoud Ahmadinejad, then-President of Iran, was invited to speak at Columbia by Lee Bollinger, then-President of Columbia, despite objections from Columbia-Barnard Hillel, the Anti-Defamation League, and thousands of protesters. Critics of Ahmadinejad have called him antisemitic, citing his calls for the destruction of the State of Israel, support for Hezbollah, and Holocaust denial.

=== 2010s ===
In 2011, Kenneth L. Marcus, then director of the Initiative on Anti-Semitism at the Institute for Jewish and Community Research, filed a complaint with the US Department of Education's Office for Civil Rights—which Marcus himself led between 2003 and 2004—accusing Columbia of discriminating against a Jewish student because the student was allegedly discouraged from taking a class with Joseph Massad.

==== 2018 vandalism incident ====
In late November 2018, psychology Professor Elizabeth Midlarsky discovered antisemitic vandalism in her office. The vandalism included two large red swastikas and antisemitic slurs painted on her wall. Midlarsky had previously been the subject of a similar incident in 2007, when a swastika had been painted on her office door and antisemitic fliers had been placed in her mailbox.

==== Department of Education complaint ====
On December 19, 2019, a student at Columbia filed a complaint with the Department of Education, claiming that the administration's inaction had led to an environment where students and staff are "harassed, singled out and discriminated against under the guise of ‘pro-Palestinian’ advocacy." The student claimed that repeated interruptions of pro-Israel events by anti-Israel groups, as well as Israeli Apartheid Week, justified his complaint.

The Algemeiner reported that Jamie Kreitman, a Jewish alumna in Middle Eastern Languages and Cultures, filed a complaint in 2019 with the U.S. Department of Education’s Office for Civil Rights, describing the Center for Palestinian Studies and the Middle East Institute as a "hub for the spread of anti-Semitic misinformation and the promotion of anti-Semitic activities."

=== 2020s ===
==== Allegations of antisemitism during the Gaza war ====
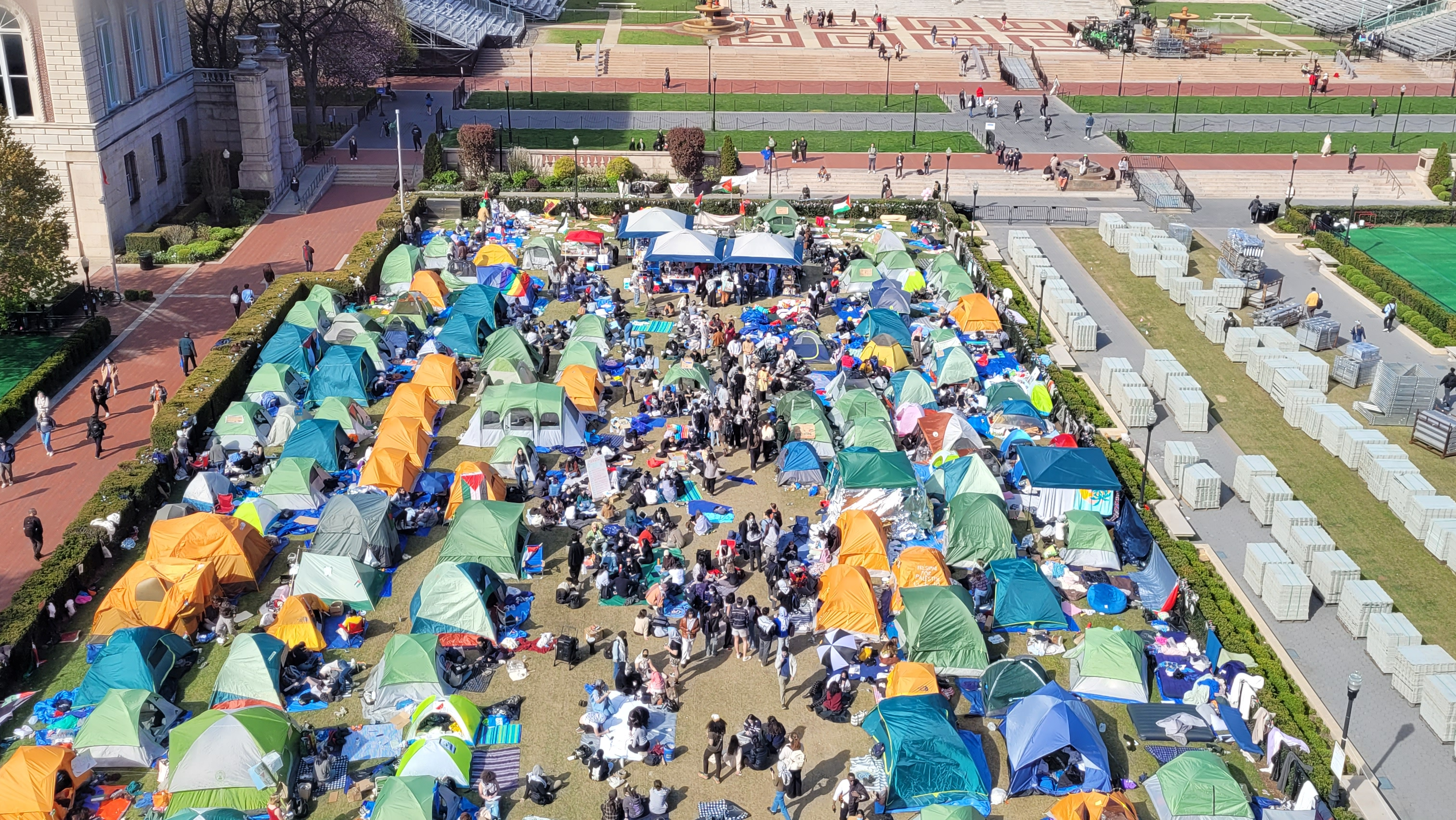
The reinstated Gaza Solidarity Encampment at Columbia (April 2024)

During the Gaza war and protests at Columbia against the genocide, the distinction between anti-Zionism and antisemitism was debated in the media, often in relation to Columbia University. Elise Stefanik and Lisa McClain of the US House Committee on Education and Workforce described chants heard on the campus such as "from the river to the sea" and "globalize the intifada" as antisemitic. Israeli Prime Minister Benjamin Netanyahu and the Anti-Defamation League under the direction of Jonathan Greenblatt described the student protest movement in solidarity with Palestine as antisemitic and connected to "terrorism." Critics of these characterizations—including scholars, journalists, and activists—described them as exploiting the accusation of antisemitism to silence criticism of Israel.

===== Incidents =====
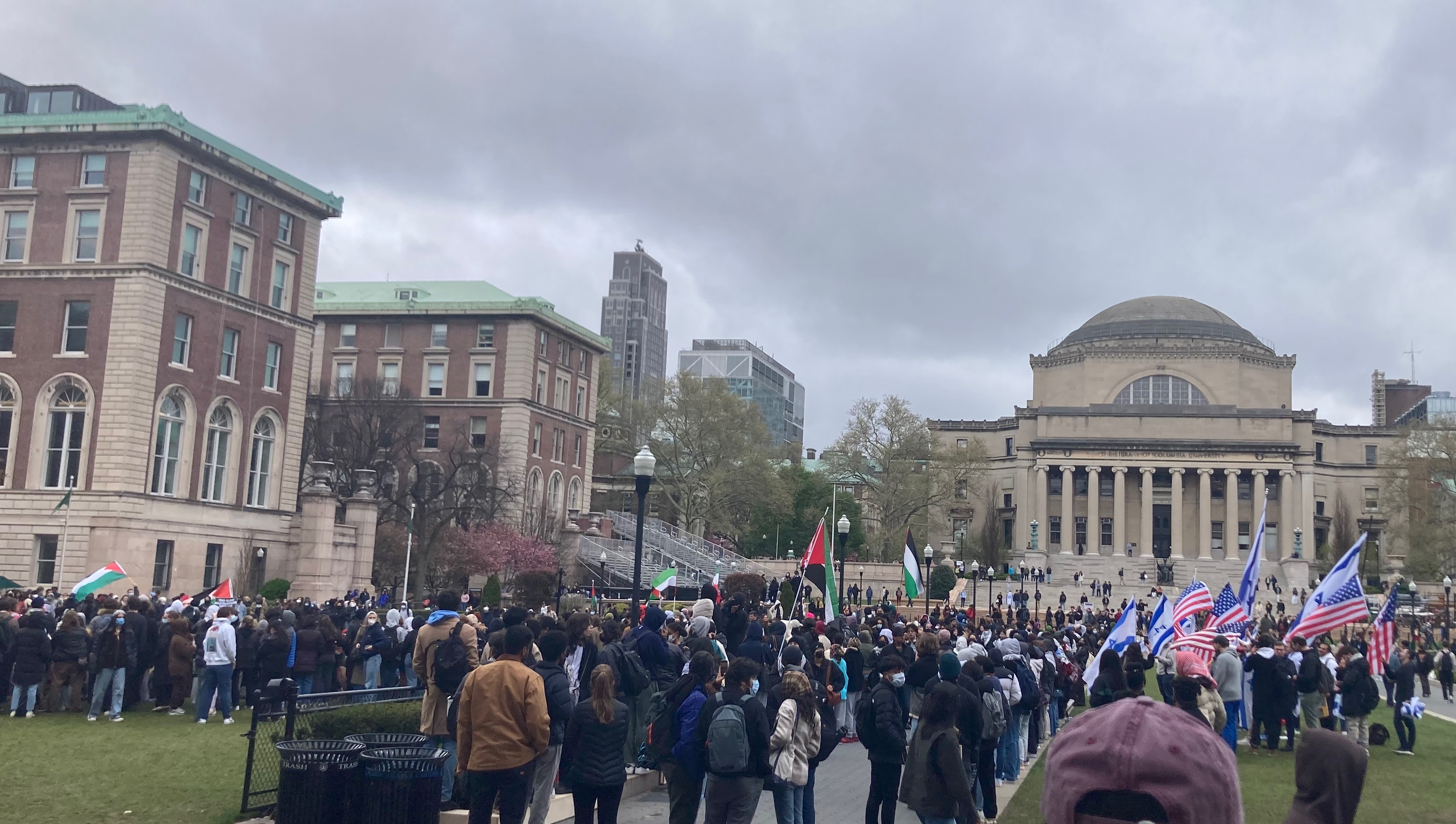
Pro-Israel counter-protesters on Columbia's campus (April 2024)

On 8 October 2023, Massad's piece "Just another battle or the Palestinian war of liberation?" was published in The Electronic Intifada. A petition by a student calling for the "immediate removal of Joseph Massad from Columbia's faculty"—which specifically criticized Massad's use of the words "astonishing," "astounding," and "awesome" in the article, claiming it showed "support for the terrorist organization"—quickly gained attention after it was shared by former US ambassador to Israel David M. Friedman on X, formerly Twitter. Amid the ensuing campaign against Massad, which included death threats with one Massad said was slid under his office door, hundreds of Columbia affiliates signed an October 15 letter calling on Columbia President Minouche Shafik to "unequivocally guarantee his physical safety and his academic freedom as well as those of our University’s faculty and students more broadly." On October 19, Eve M. Troutt Powell, historian and president of the Middle East Studies Association (MESA), and Laurie Brand, chair of MESA's Committee on Academic Freedom, wrote a letter to Shafik expressing concern over the university's failure to defend Massad.

Following the October 7 attack, Mohamed Abdou, a visiting scholar who had said that he sides with Hamas and Islamic Jihad, was hired by the university. In April 2024, president Minouche Shafik said Abdou was on his way out of the university.

On November 16, 2023, the US House Committee on Education and Workforce opened an investigation into Columbia and six other schools, including Cornell University, the University of Pennsylvania, and Cooper Union, for alleged violations of Title VI of the Civil Rights Act of 1964. The committee was responding to five complaints of antisemitic harassment and two of anti-Muslim harassment, though it was not initially clear which applied to Columbia.

In January 2024, Katherine Franke, a professor of law in Columbia, said many Israeli students coming straight from military service were known to harass Palestinian and other students. Elise Stefanik later misquoted Franke as saying that 'all Israeli students who have served in the IDF are dangerous and shouldn't be on campus'. It was later reported that the Congresswoman had paraphrased a source which had paraphrased another source.

The university was sued in February 2024 by Jewish students; the suit alleged that in the university “mobs of pro-Hamas students and faculty march by the hundreds shouting vile antisemitic slogans, including calls to genocide.

In a hearing before Congress in April 2024, Columbia University president Minouche Shafik condemned antisemitism and said that "from the river to the sea" is antisemitic. Professors in the university were under investigation according to the president for antisemitic remarks. Shafik said that dozens of students were disciplined and that Columbia University is in a "moral crisis".

In April 2024, The Jerusalem Post reported that during anti-Israel protests, some students called for intifada and urged Hamas brigades to kill Israeli soldiers. Anti-Israel activists sang songs in support of Hamas and chanted slogans expressing solidarity with the organization. The Palestine Solidarity Working Group defended militancy and praised Hamas's attacks against Israel. Anti-Israel protestors also made derogatory remarks towards Jewish students, telling them to "Go back to Europe" and taunting them with calls of "Jews" and "Go back to Poland".

Jewish students reported feeling unsafe, being spat on, and expressed relief at leaving the university. They felt their grievances were not adequately represented by student representatives. One protestor threatened Jewish students, stating, "The 7th of October is going to be every day for you!". Some of the anti-Israel protestors also chanted "From the water to the war (a reference to the Jordan river and the Mediterranean), Palestine is Arab" which is considered a call for the cleansing of the region from Jews and the denial of Jewish rights for self sovereignty.

Journalist Seth Mandel argued that many universities were promoting the idea that Jews should be displaced from their homes because they belong to a race that supposedly belongs elsewhere, citing incidents at Columbia University as an example.

The President of the United States, Joe Biden, condemned the protests saying "Even in recent days, we’ve seen harassment and calls for violence against Jews. This blatant antisemitism is reprehensible and dangerous – and it has absolutely no place on college campuses, or anywhere in our country." The mayor of New York said he was "horrified and disgusted with the antisemitism being spewed at and around the Columbia University campus" and decided to increase police presence around campus. New York State governor Kathy Hochul also condemned the protests, stating that students have the "right to learn in an environment free from harassment or violence". The protestors responded by saying they were peaceful and distanced themselves from non-student protestors.

Following an incident the same month involving Israeli professor Shai Davidai, Robert Kraft, CEO of Kraft Group and owner of New England Patriots football team, said he would stop donating to the university due to its inability to keep Jewish students safe and was saddened by the hatred growing in campus and the country.

Due to the intensity of anti-Israel protests, Columbia University allowed students to take classes and exams virtually. Rep. Virginia Foxx, chair of the United States House Committee on Education and the Workforce, warned Columbia University that the failure of Columbia to ensure safety was in violation of the university's Title VI obligations, on which is conditioned federal assistance to the university.

In April 2024, Rabbi Elie Buechler, who is linked to Columbia University's Orthodox Union Jewish Learning Initiative, urged Jewish students to remain home or return home due to safety concerns.

In June 2024, the Jewish Chronicle reported that Columbia academics held classes in protests. The Chronicle also reported that professors questioned Jewish students regarding their opinions on Israel's military campaign. The Chronicle also found that Jewish students were told by the professors that the Jews "control the media", which is a common antisemitic trope.

In July 2024, the university's president and provost announced in a joint statement that three deans had been placed on permanent leave after leaked text messages revealed discussions about Jewish life on campus that "disturbingly touched on ancient antisemitic tropes."

In September 2024, the Columbia Daily Spectator interviewed six Jewish students who were accepted to Columbia for the 2024-2025 school year and declined their offers due to concerns of antisemitism on campus.

On October 14, 2024, Senator Joni Ernst and Representative Elise Stefanik jointly sent a letter to assistant director in charge of the FBI New York Field Office James E. Dennehy, saying that "federal intervention is now necessary" in response to rising antisemitism at Columbia University. A copy of the letter was sent to Katrina Armstrong, the interim president of Columbia University. In the letter, Ernst and Stefanik criticized rhetoric from the Columbia University Apartheid Divest, specifically referencing CUAD's statement that "violence is the only path forward". Shortly after the letter was released, a spokesperson for Columbia said that "calls for violence have no place" at any higher education institution.

In 2024 and 2025, the Anti-Defamation League gave Columbia a D on the "Campus Antisemitism Report Card," which the advocacy group first launched in spring 2024.

===== Task Force on Antisemitism =====
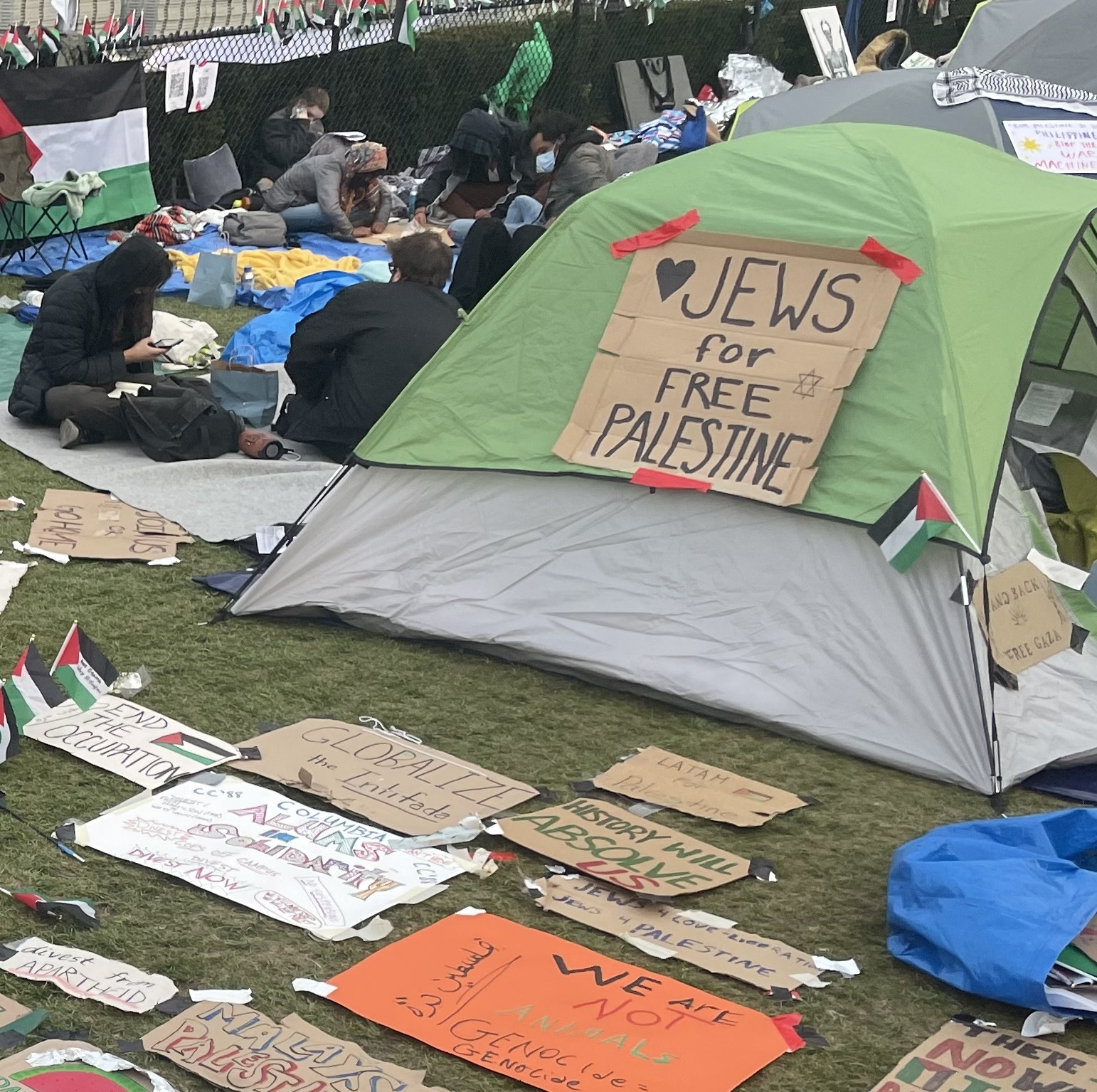
"Jews for free Palestine" sign on a tent at the Gaza Solidarity Encampment (April 2024)

Presidents Minouche Shafik of Columbia University, Laura Rosenbury of Barnard College, and Thomas Bailey of the Teachers College announced the creation of a Task Force on Antisemitism on November 1, 2023, weeks into the Gaza war and protests against it at Columbia. It was co-chaired by Esther Fuchs, Nicholas Lemann, and David Schizer. It did not initially offer a definition of antisemitism, for which it was criticized by some, such as James Schamus.

====== First report ======
On March 4, 2024, Columbia's Task Force on Antisemitism released its first report, in which it did not define antisemitism but called for more restrictions on protests.

It found that Jewish students are experiencing “isolation and pain” and admonished the administration for insufficient enforcement of rules against unauthorized demonstrations related to the Israel–Hamas conflict. The report noted that Jewish students at Columbia described feeling marginalized regardless of their stance on Israel. It observed that, although many Jewish and Israeli affiliates expressed support for the right to protest and voiced sorrow over civilian casualties in Gaza, some interpreted chants such as “Globalize the Intifada” and “Death to the Zionist State” as threats of violence directed at themselves and their families. The report was criticised by The Intercept and some Jewish students, for misrepresentations, omission of key context, and equating anti-Zionism with antisemitism.

====== Second report ======
In late August 2024, Columbia's Task Force on Antisemitism released a second report. News of the report was first published on June 16 in the Israeli newspaper Haaretz, in an interview with the task force's co-chairs, before any official communication from the university. In the report, the Task Force characterized anti-Zionism as antisemitism and said the university had failed to protect Jews in the university from violence and hate and that antisemitism carried out by both faculty and students had "affected the entire university community".

The report called for urgent action against antisemitism. The antisemitism task force reported that antisemitism is common in students' clubs, classrooms and dorms. The antisemitism task force over 20 meetings interviewed 500 students regarding antisemitism in Columbia. According to the report, a Jewish student who placed a mezuza on her dorm's doorway in accordance with Jewish tradition was targeted from October onwards, leading her to leave the dorm. The task force found that a faculty member had recommended prohibiting Israeli military veterans from studying at the university, although Jewish Israelis are required by law to serve in the Israeli military in Israel. Another faculty member told an Israeli student veteran that she had served an "army of murderers". The report also found that a faculty member referred to Jewish donors as "wealthy white capitalists" and accused Jewish donors of laundering money in the university. According to the report, Jewish students were chased off campus, students wearing the Kippah were spat on, and a Jewish woman was pushed. The report found that the term "Zionist" was conflated with Jews and there was a "slippage" that "felt intentional" in the usage of the terms. The report also found that the anti-Zionism in the university is closer to antisemitism than to criticism of Israel. Armstrong, the interim president of Columbia, said the "incidents of antisemitism recounted in this report are completely unacceptable" and said there was "no place" for discrimination or hate in Columbia University.

On September 5, less than a week after the task force's report was published, 24 Columbia faculty wrote an open letter to the Columbia Spectator (later co-signed by seven more and 16 non-Jewish faculty members, criticizing the task force's findings. The letter condemned antisemitism at Columbia while also expressing criticisms of the university's report, which it alleges contains "considerable flaws" and fails to properly define a number of terms that were pertinent to the report's main goals. In particular, it asserted that Columbia's task force had exaggerated the number of antisemitic incidents reported by Jewish students by improperly conflating "discussions or chants that made some Jewish students feel uncomfortable" with antisemitism. On September 17, thirty-four Jewish faculty members jointly wrote an op-ed published in the Columbia Spectator that criticized the Spectator's coverage of the aforementioned open letter, especially its quotes of statements by Professors Nicholas Lemann and Ester Fuchs (both co-chairs of the task force) that they said "wilfully mischaracterized" views of the writers and positions taken in the open letter.

Fuchs, Schizer, and Lemann presented the second report at a September 20 University Senate plenary meeting, where a heated debate broke out. The Columbia Spectator reported that "multiple senators raised concerns about whether the task force’s membership reflected a diverse range of views, the methodology employed in compiling the second report, and the lack of institutional resources devoted to examining discrimination faced by other protected classes at the University."

====== Third report ======
In July 2025, the task force's third report, an Exclusion Survey report was published. The report presents findings from a large‑scale survey conducted in 2024, which revealed that Jewish and Muslim students felt significantly less accepted on campus than their peers. While half of all respondents reported a general sense of belonging, only about a third of Jewish students and two‑fifths of Muslim students expressed similar feelings. Many in both groups said they were uneasy about openly discussing their views on the Israel–Hamas conflict, with majorities reporting that such expression sometimes left them feeling unsafe. The task force emphasized that these results confirm widespread discomfort and exclusion during the 2023–24 academic year, but also stressed that the problems are solvable. Columbia has committed to repeating the survey periodically and supplementing it with qualitative research to track progress and guide improvements in campus climate.

====== Fourth report ======
In December 2025, the task force's fourth and final report was published, based on the classroom experience. The report concluded that Jewish and Israeli students were often treated unfairly in classroom settings, where they were singled out or blamed for broader political issues. It also found a structural problem in Columbia's Middle East studies program: nearly all faculty approached the subject from an explicitly anti-Zionist perspective, leaving students with very few opportunities to study the region through a more balanced or diverse lens.

==== Settlement with the Trump administration ====
In February 2025, Leo Terrell, the chair of the Department of Justice's Task Force to Combat Antisemitism, announced that he would investigate Columbia University as part of the Department of Justice's broader investigation into antisemitism on college campuses. On March 7, 2024, days after the Federal Task Force to Combat Antisemitism announced it was considering stop-work orders on $51.4 million in federal contracts with the university, the Trump administration announced a $400 million cut.

On May 22, 2025, the US Department of Health and Human Services (HHS) Office for Civil Rights (OCR) announced that Columbia violated Title VI of the Civil Rights Act of 1964. According to the OCR, the university acted with "deliberate indifference towards student-on-student harassment of Jewish students from October 7, 2023, through the present".

In July 2025, the university disciplined at least 70 students who took part in campus protests, with punishments including probation, suspensions, degree revocations, and expulsions. The next day, Columbia finalized negotiations with the Trump administration and agreed to pay the federal government a $220 million settlement. In the negotiations, Trump's team was led by Stephen Miller and Columbia was represented by Jay Lefkowitz and Matt Owen of the law firm Kirkland & Ellis. As part of the deal, Columbia agreed to provide the federal government with the private information of applicants to the university—those admitted as well as those not admitted—including their race, GPA, and standardized test scores.

==== Adoption of the IHRA definition of antisemitism ====
Amid negotiations with the Trump administration over the federal funding it withdrew from Columbia, acting president Claire Shipman announced in July, 2025 that Columbia would adopt the IHRA definition of antisemitism and partner with the Anti-Defamation League (ADL) and Project Shema, an initiative created to promote empathy and awareness of Jewish experiences within progressive communities, to provide educational programs on antisemitism for students, faculty, and staff.

Critics of the decision, including Columbia's Knight First Amendment Institute and the American Association of University Professors, condemned the decision for its infringements upon academic freedom and freedom of expression. Columbia professors Marianne Hirsch, a scholar of genocide and memory, and Rashid Khalidi, Palestinian historian and former Edward Said Professor of Modern Arab Studies, have said that the definition would restrict their ability to do their work. Khalidi cited Columbia's adoption of the IHRA definition as the reason he cancelled his fall lecture course History of the Modern Middle East.

=== Lawsuits ===
In March 2025, nine U.S. and Israeli citizens affected by Hamas’s October 7 attacks on Israel—including relatives of those killed or taken hostage and two Israeli soldiers enrolled at Columbia—filed a lawsuit against Columbia student groups and protest leaders. The complaint alleged that organizations such as Columbia Students for Justice in Palestine, Columbia University Apartheid Divest, Within Our Lifetime, United for Palestine and Columbia and Columbia-Barnard Jewish Voice for Peace, along with activists, operated as a propaganda arm of Hamas and received backing from affiliated groups. The suit claimed that protesters harassed Jewish and Israeli students, and further alleged that Columbia’s SJP chapter had advance knowledge of the October 7 attack, citing an Instagram post published minutes before it began. The plaintiffs, represented by the National Jewish Advocacy Center, seek financial damages for, among other things, “mental anguish and pain and suffering.”

In July 2025, the U.S. Equal Employment Opportunity Commission (EEOC) announced that Columbia University had agreed to a $21 million class settlement fund to resolve allegations of civil rights violations against Jewish employees following the October 7 attacks. This is a settlement of the Title VII investigation of the university from the federal government's Equal Employment Opportunity Commission (EEOC), which will also decide Jewish employees' eligibility for compensation and how much money each will receive. The case stemmed from a Commissioner’s Charge filed in June 2024 by Acting Chair Andrea R. Lucas, which alleged that Columbia had engaged in a pattern of harassment based on religion, national origin, or race in violation of Title VII of the Civil Rights Act of 1964. The resolution was described as the largest public settlement secured by the EEOC in nearly two decades, and the most significant in its history involving antisemitism or any faith‑based discrimination. Columbia entered into the agreement voluntarily, without admitting liability, as part of a broader arrangement with the Trump administration. Some faculty members, including James Schamus, criticized the fund and questioned whether Jewish professors would be given compensation if they supported the Gaza Solidarity Encampment.

== See also ==
- Antisemitism in US Higher Education
- Mothers Against College Antisemitism
