= Tablet (magazine) =

American Jewish online magazine

- August 2025 issue of the magazine
- Editor: Alana Newhouse
- Categories: Jewish history, culture, politics
- Frequency: Monthly (print)
- Publisher: Nextbook
- First issue: June 2009; 17 years ago
- Country: United States
- Language: English
- Website: tabletmag.com
- ISSN: 1551-2940

Tablet is an American magazine focused on Jewish news and culture, featuring journalism, commentary, criticism, fiction, and essays. It was founded in 2009 by editor-in-chief Alana Newhouse and is supported by the Nextbook foundation. Tablet has won National Magazine Awards, including one for General Excellence. The magazine has been described as conservative or center-right by Jewish organizations.

== History ==
=== Founding ===
The inspiration for Tablet came as writer Alana Newhouse researched the work of Roman Vishniac and his historic photos of the Jewish community. After being inspired by the diverse community represented in the photos, Newhouse decided to found a magazine for the contemporary Jewish community, which would be diverse in thought. According to Newhouse, the magazine would be for "Jews who are different—definitively, impolitely, even offensively different—to share a space with one another". Tablet was founded as a web magazine in June 2009, in New York, with the support of the Nextbook foundation as a rebranded and news-focused version of the Jewish literary journal Nextbook. In the three years after its founding, New York Magazine described Tablet as a "must-read for young politically and culturally engaged Jews". Its reporting has largely focused on Jewish news and culture.

Tablet styled itself as the first "multimedia Jewish journalistic enterprise" and said it reports on politics and religion and hosts podcasts. Tablet received National Magazine Awards in 2010 and 2011, one for Vox Tablet and one for its blog. The magazine won a Rockower Award in 2013 and another in 2022.

=== Evolution and controversies ===
In 2011, Tablet announced that Jeffrey Goldberg would move his blog from the website of The Atlantic to Tablet. Goldberg corroborated the announcement in June 2011, but never took this action and continued to publish in The Atlantic. In May 2016, after Tablet literary editor David Samuels published a profile of Obama advisor Ben Rhodes in The New York Times Magazine that called Goldberg a "handpicked Beltway insider" who helped to "retail" the arguments of the Obama administration in support of the Iran deal, Goldberg attributed the negative characterization to a "longtime personal grudge" held by Samuels as a result of Goldberg's decision not to move to Tablet.

In 2012, Tablet published a review of Breaking Bad by Anna Breslaw in which Breslaw criticized Holocaust survivors, including those in her family, as "villains masquerading as victims who, solely by virtue of surviving (very likely by any means necessary), felt that they had earned the right to be heroes [...] conniving, indestructible, taking and taking." Jeffrey Goldberg observed in The Atlantic that Tablet had "brought together Commentary's John Podhoretz and The Nation's Katha Pollitt [...] by publishing a vicious attack on Holocaust survivors", and called for the magazine to publish an apology to Holocaust survivors. The magazine did apologize for publishing Breslaw's piece. In In These Times, staff writer Lindsay Beyerstein called the article "the worst thing that Tablet has ever published" and "a disgrace on every level".

In September 2014, The New York Observer wrote that Tablet had become "known for its exceptional Jewish arts and culture coverage since its founding five years ago", and was frequently publishing "thoughtful pieces challenging many of the religion’s tenets". However, after the 2014 Gaza War, The New York Observer notes that Tablet was frequently publishing right-wing defenses of Israeli policy, alongside fewer left-wing pieces sympathetic to Palestinians. When Tablet acting editor-in-chief Mark Oppenheimer was asked if there was a editorial line at the magazine, he stated there was "no editorial position at all."

In February 2015, Tablet tested a monetization method in which viewers could read articles for free but were required to pay to comment on them. Commenting cost $2 per day, $18 per month, or $180 per year.

In October 2017, Tablet published an article by Mark Oppenheimer titled "The Specifically Jewish Perviness of Harvey Weinstein". The article argued that Harvey Weinstein's sexual assaults were distinctively Jewish and was shared favorably by David Duke and neo-Nazi Richard Spencer. Oppenheimer apologized for the piece, which was described in Jewish left-leaning quarterly magazine Jewish Currents as both supporting "an antisemitic stereotype" and avoiding discussion of "the rampant misogyny that exists in both the Jewish and non-Jewish worlds".

After several articles published in 2017, many critics wrote to the magazine, complaining that Tablet was either too liberal, or too conservative. Founding editor Alana Newhouse responded to critics in an article, claiming the magazine was designed to be "heterodox" without any "party line". On September 29, 2022, the Association for Jewish Studies (AJS) "paused" a relationship with Tablet that had enabled the magazine to place advertisements through AJS. The pause came in response to complaints by AJS members about the increasingly right-wing nature of Tablet, referencing articles critical of transgender healthcare, COVID-19 vaccines, a published interview with an antisemite, and new editors supportive of the policies of President Donald Trump. Tablet editors maintained that their magazine still aimed to represent many viewpoints, and rabbi Shaul Magid claimed none of his articles critical of Zionism were ever censored by the magazine.

In January 2025, scholar Steven Windmueller noted Tablet as a publication in which "conservative Jewish political thought" is regularly disseminated, acting as part of a growing movement for Jewish conservatism. In May 2025, Tablet launched a monthly print edition of the magazine, reportedly edited by Lorin Stein of The Paris Review. The print magazine has ads on the back cover. The Nation said the ads promote products of Peter Thiel, Bari Weiss, and Mike Solana's newsletter Pirate Wires.

== Notable stories ==
In July 2012, Tablet contributor Michael C. Moynihan broke the story on journalist Jonah Lehrer's fabrication of Bob Dylan quotes in his book Imagine. Tablet's publication of the article ultimately led to Lehrer's resignation from The New Yorker and publisher Houghton Mifflin Harcourt's recall of Imagine and his second book How We Decide. Moynihan's investigation into Lehrer and the circumstances surrounding the publication of the article later became subject of Jon Ronson's So You've Been Publicly Shamed.

In August 2018, while Julia Salazar was campaigning for election to the New York State Senate, Tablet published an article questioning Salazar's claims that she was Jewish and an immigrant. Jewish Currents published an interview in which Salazar responded to the Tablet piece.

After the Pittsburgh synagogue shooting in 2018, Newhouse and all six members of the magazine's editorial staff traveled to Pittsburgh to report on the shooting and its aftermath. Newhouse told The New York Times that "large-picture stories [and] the big-picture trends on right-wing radicalization" could be "left for think pieces for later", saying that Tablet staff were "focused on pieces where we could root them in the stories of actual human beings affected by this one way or the other." The magazine's coverage included reporting on the funerals of people killed in the shooting, and a special edition of its podcast Unorthodox.

In December 2018, Tablet published an article about the Women's March in Washington, D.C., after Donald Trump was elected president. It argued that the march's leaders had excluded Jewish women from leadership positions and used antisemitic language since the organization began in 2016. It especially critiqued connections to Louis Farrakhan. The article came after months of growing pressure on the group, including local chapters issuing critiques and the National Organization for Women ending financial support (though still encouraging members to attend Women's March events). The organizers spoke against Farrakhan's most extreme statements, issued an apology, and made organizational changes to better include Jews in leadership. But the leadership did not generally condemn Farrakhan, which led to enduring backlash.

In April 2021, Tablet published an article by Heritage Foundation researcher Jay P. Greene, Do No Harm director Ian Kingsbury, and Albert Cheng, an assistant professor in the Department of Education Reform at the University of Arkansas, about a survey that found that, in contrast to the consensus that education reduces antisemitism, more highly educated people may be more antisemitic. The survey was based on the concept of a double standard, and asked questions of respondents while showing them one of two examples, where only one was related to Judaism; for example, one question asked whether public gatherings during the COVID-19 pandemic "posed a threat to public health and should have been prevented" and provided either Black Lives Matter protests or Orthodox Jewish funerals as examples. The researchers asserted in Tablet that respondents to the questions should have answered similarly regardless of the examples given, and that respondents' tendencies to apply principles more harshly to Jews than non-Jews indicated antisemitism.

== Staff ==
Tablet's editor-in-chief is Alana Newhouse. Her husband David Samuels is literary editor. Liel Leibovitz is editor-at-large, and Lee Smith is a contributor.

Sasha Senderovich and Shaul Magid have both become critical of Tablet after initially contributing work to it. Senderovich left the magazine after a series of 2017 articles in which Leibovitz defended Trump adviser Sebastian Gorka, while Magid left in 2021 after feeling that his internal criticism of conservative content was ineffective.

Tablet's stable of contributors and contributing editors includes journalists Matti Friedman, Wesley Yang, and Michael C. Moynihan, fiction writers Howard Jacobson, Dara Horn, David Bezmozgis, Ayelet Tsabari, Etgar Keret, and Ben Marcus, academics Elisa New, Bernard-Henri Lévy, Edward Luttwak, Walter Russell Mead, Norman Doidge, Jacob Soll, Michael Lind, Natalie Zemon Davis, and Maxim D. Shrayer, novelist Marc Weitzmann, the critics Marco Roth, and J. Hoberman, and cartoonist Jules Feiffer.

In 2017, Tablet hired journalist Gretchen Rachel Hammond, who was fired from her reporting duties at the Windy City Times, a Chicago LGBT newspaper, after Hammond broke the story that three Jewish women were asked to leave the Chicago Dyke March for carrying rainbow flags emblazoned with Jewish stars.

== Content ==
=== Podcasts ===
In 2015, Tablet launched Unorthodox, a podcast about Jewish life and culture, hosted by Stephanie Butnick, Liel Leibovitz, and Mark Oppenheimer, who later left the show to be replaced by Joshua Malina. The podcast features a weekly roundup of the "News of the Jews," an interview with a "Jew of the Week," and an interview with a "Gentile of the Week." The podcast has been downloaded over six million times and produces a live show that has performed across the United States. It no longer produces new episodes.

Tablet Studios has published a range of podcasts, including Radioactive, about antisemitic radio priest Charles Coughlin, Gatecrashers, about the history of Jews in the Ivy League (see Seth Low Junior College, and Take One, a daily podcast in which the host and a guest discuss a page of Talmud. From 2014 to 2022, Tablet partnered with the podcast Israel Story on its first six seasons.

Until the summer of 2016, Tablet also hosted Vox Tablet, a National Magazine Award-winning podcast that launched in 2005 under the brief of then editor Blake Eskin. It was previously known as the Nextbook podcast. A weekly show, it included interviews with cultural luminaries including Michael Chabon, Norman Mailer, Aline Kominsky Crumb, Fyvush Finkel, and others. It also featured reported stories from around the globe by Daniel Estrin, Gregory Warner, and other seasoned journalists and was produced by Julie Subrin and hosted by Sara Ivry.

In December 2023, the USC Shoah Foundation announced its partnership with Tablet Studios, to launch a collection of audio and video testimonies from the 2023 Hamas-led attack on Israel.

=== Lists ===
In 2010, Tablet published the first of its "Greatest" lists: the "100 Greatest Jewish Songs." In 2011, Tablet published the "100 Greatest Jewish Films," which awarded its top spot to E.T. the Extra-Terrestrial. In 2013, Tablet published its list of "101 Great Jewish Books," including authors such as Betty Friedan, Sholem Aleichem, Karl Marx and Art Spiegelman.

In 2018, Tablet published the "100 Most Jewish Foods," which spawned a book of the same title. Also in 2018, the magazine began a line of books published with Artisan. These include The Newish Jewish Encyclopedia and a Passover Haggadah with artwork by Shai Azoulay.
