= Rachael Kohn =

Australian author and broadcaster

Rachael Linda Kohn AO FRSN is a Canadian-born Australian author, broadcaster, and public intellectual. From July 1992 to December 2018 she produced and presented programs on religion and spirituality for ABC Radio National, including The Religion Report, Religion Today, The Ark and, principally, The Spirit of Things from 1997 to December 2018. Kohn retired from the ABC in December 2018.

== Early life and education ==
Rachael Linda Kohn was born in 1953 and grew up Jewish in Canada, the child of a Holocaust survivors, as were many of her friends. Both of her parents are from Czechoslovakia. Her parents fled the Soviet occupation of Czechoslovakia to settle in Israel in 1949, moving to Canada in 1952, where she was born. She says that hearing about the Holocaust sparked her interest in studying religion and the "big questions", including "Why did things get so terrible?", and she retains a lifelong interest in the relationship between Christianity and Judaism, ancient and modern.

Kohn was awarded a diploma in social work from Ryerson Polytechnical Institute in Toronto, Ontario. She then earned BA Hons in sociology and religion at Concordia University in Montreal, Quebec, followed by an MA (Rabbinic Thought and the New Testament, 1979) and a Ph.D. (Sociology and History of Religion, 1985) in Religious Studies from McMaster University in Hamilton, Ontario. She also studied Buddhism in both degrees.

== Career ==
Kohn taught religious studies at McMaster University and at Lancaster University in Lancaster, England, where she was Leverhulme Post-Doctoral Fellow in Religious Studies in 1986. She taught Religious Studies at the University of Waterloo in Waterloo, Ontario.

Kohn moved to Australia and taught at the University of Sydney, specialising in religious cults and new religions, between 1999 and 1992, as well as Jewish history in the Dept of Semitic Studies, before joining the Australian Broadcasting Corporation (ABC), at the request of Father Paul Collins, head of the Religious Department. She broadcast programs on Radio National and was senior religion producer, working across several programs, including The Religion Report, Religion Today, The Ark and The Spirit of Things. She created, produced, and presented The Spirit of Things from 1997 until 2018. She also produced and presented films for Compass. Through all her programs Rachael hoped to help educate the public about religion as both a force in history and in personal development. Along the way, she interviewed many high-profile religious and spiritual leaders, including British Lord Chief Rabbi Jonathan Sacks, Benedictine Sister Joan Chittister, and the Dalai Lama.

Kohn has also produced many documentary features, such as "In God We Trust: Civil and Uncivil Religion in America" (1999), "Coffee, Sex and Other Addictions: Health fads of the 19th Century" (2002), She produced, for The Spirit of Things, "The Monk and the Modern Girl" (2003).

Kohn also produced and presented the ABC TV documentaries: the two-part series, The Dead Sea Scrolls (2000); the two-part series, Buddhism East and West (2001); and Paws for Thought (Animals and Spirituality), for Compass.

Kohn has been a frequent speaker on religion and spirituality in Australia.

== Other roles and activities ==
Kohn is co-founder, and was vice chair of (from 2012 until at least 2019), the International Association of Religion Journalists.

She was a member of the advisory board at the Centre for Interfaith and Cultural Dialogue at Griffith University in Queensland from 2004 until 2014.

== Recognition and awards ==
Kohn is the recipient of at least three New York Festivals World Radio Division Gold Medals, for "In God We Trust: Civil and Uncivil Religion in America" (1999), "Coffee, Sex and Other Addictions: Health fads of the 19th Century" (2002), and The Monk and the Modern Girl (2004).

On 31 December 1999, Kohn was one of 101 Australians chosen to represent "the faces of a century" photographed on the front cover of The Australian national newspaper.

In 2005, she was listed in The Australian as one of "Australia's Top 50 Intellectuals.

In 2005, the University of New South Wales awarded Kohn a Doctor of Letters degree honoris causa.

In the 2019 Queen's Birthday Honours, Kohn was appointed an Officer of the Order of Australia (AO) for "distinguished service to the broadcast media, particularly radio, as a creator, producer and presenter, and to Jewish studies".

Kohn was elected a fellow of the Royal Society of New South Wales in 2019.

On 14 May 2024, she was made Doctor of the University by the Australian Catholic University.

== Publications ==
In addition to her books, The New Believers: Re-imagining God (2003) and Curious Obsessions in the History of Science and Spirituality (2007),The Other Side of the Story: Essays on Jews, Christians, Cults, Women, Atheists and Artists (2021), Kohn has published numerous articles, chapters, and essays in books, journals and newspapers and on the ABC Religion and Ethics website.. 'Religion and the Media' in The Spirit of The Antipodes: Religion and the Study of Religion in Australia and Aotearoa New Zealand, edited by Cusack, et al, 2026.

Kohn is a frequent contributor to Quadrant.

Kohn was the editor of the Australian Journal of Jewish Studies in the 1990s. She was guest editor for Fear and Faith, a special edition of the Bonhoeffer Legacy: an International Journal in 2021.

== Personal life and views ==
Kohn moved to Australia after marrying an Australian man.

She said in a 2015 interview "Belonging is not exclusive to tradition anymore but it is important to belong to God or to something transcendent and ultimate that gives you a sense of purpose and worth beyond all the material stuff". She said that she tries to show religion "as a positive, creative, sometimes very fragile and flawed, endeavour".

She has been very concerned about antisemitism, in particular its rise in the Muslim world, and about increasing persecution of Christians globally. "I really want to get past this. I want to see a strong, open and friendly dialogue. A trialogue, between Christianity, Judaism, and Islam". She feels that more resources have been poured into combating Islamophobia in Australia than antisemitism, which is all out of proportion to the reality of the hate that Jews in all areas are facing with the complicity of major institutions, and said that she was told by the ABC management that, as a Jewish person, she was not suited to present programs about antisemitism.

After the 2025 Bondi Beach attack on a group of Jewish people out celebrating Hanukkah on 14 December 2025, Kohn wrote an article The Australian entitled "Zionism: a modern, secular term for a historic reality" on 27 December, with the byline "Australian Jews understand the present through the lens of what has gone before". In it, she explains the historical origins of Zionism, stating that the term "has been turned into a badge of opprobrium by Western nations ignorant of their biblical roots and their Judaeo-Christian heritage which profoundly informed their democracies". She also criticises the Wikipedia coverage of the Israel-Gaza war, based on Israeli journalist Ashley Rindsberg's article about it on the online blog Pirate Wires.
