= Antisemitism in US higher education =

Discrimination against Jewish people in US universities

Jews have faced antisemitism and discrimination in universities and campuses in the United States, from the founding of universities in the Thirteen Colonies until the present day, in varying intensities. From the early 20th century until the 1960s, indirect quotas were placed on Jewish admissions. Quotas were first placed on Jews by elite universities such as Columbia, Harvard and Yale, and were prevalent as late as the 1960s in universities such as Stanford. A resurgence of antisemitism in US higher education in the early 21st century was directed in part by the growth of Anti-Zionism and Antisemitism by university students and facult in opposition to Israeli actions in the context of the Israeli–Palestinian conflict. Supporters of Israel, including US politicians, have characterized protests in solidarity with Palestine, especially those during the Gaza war and genocide, as antisemitic. Critics of these characterizations describe them as weaponizing the accusation of antisemitism to silence solidarity with Palestine and the critique of Israel, despite physical attacks on Jewish students on American campuses.In 2025, Donald Trump announced major federal funding cuts to universities he has described as antisemitic. Under his administration, U.S. Immigration and Customs Enforcement (ICE) has carried out a campaign of deportations of activists, (by cancelling their student visas) his administration has described as in-sighting antisemitic violence on campuses.

== 18th century and 19th century ==
Only one Jew, Judah Monis, received a college degree from an American university before 1800. Monis was given a job at Harvard to teach Hebrew on the condition that he convert to Christianity. Despite having converted and married a Christian, he was not embraced by his Harvard colleagues.

Due to the low proportion of Jews in the overall American population (a quarter of a million out of 63 million), according to Nathan Glazer, "... before 1880 or 1890 there were too few American Jews for them to constitute a question".

== 20th century ==
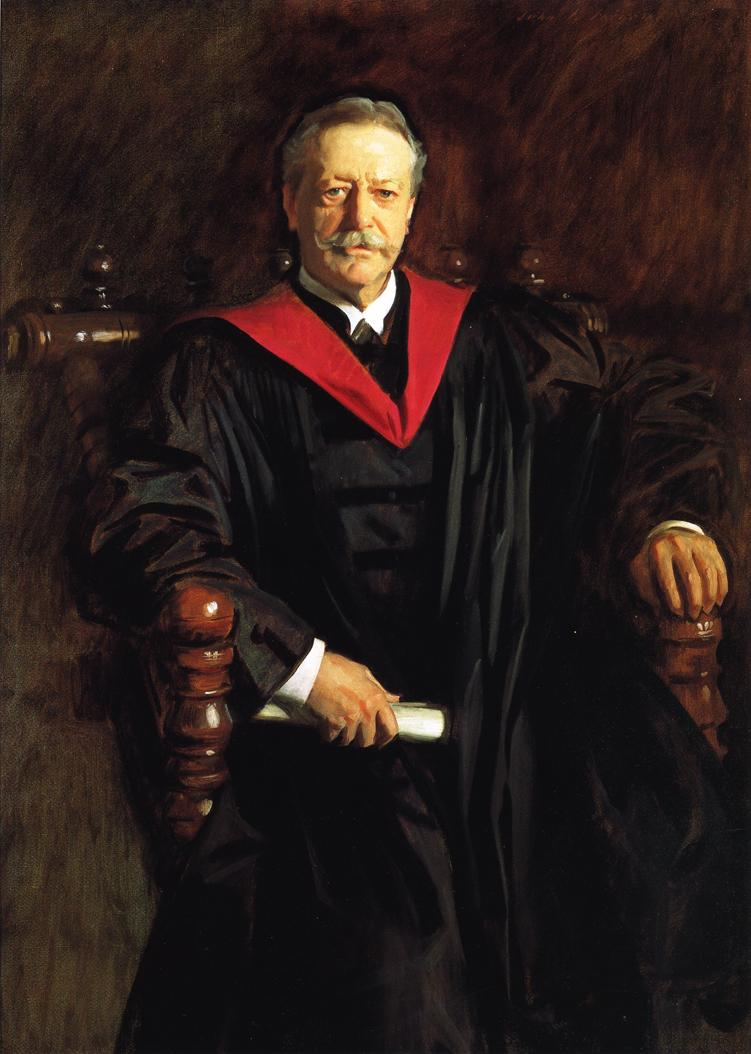
Abott Lawrence Lowell by John Singer Sargent 1923

At the beginning of the 20th century, US administrators in elite universities in the United States sought to solve what was called "the Jewish problem," referring to the idea that there were too many Jews on campuses. Administrators restricted Jewish enrollment and created the modern admissions process to restrict the number of admitted students of Jewish origin. According to the Washington Post, every major section of the application process, including geographic diversity, legacy preference, the interview and freshman class cap, was part of an effort to address "the Jewish problem" and reduce the number of Jewish students. Columbia University, Harvard, Yale and Princeton were among the first universities to restrict Jewish enrollment. Following these elite universities, hundreds of other US colleges restricted Jewish admission until the 1960s. According to Mark E. Oppenheimer, Vice President of Open Learning at American Jewish University, universities were once considered finishing schools for elite Protestant boys. Jewish students, on the other hand, saw universities as a means of social mobility and were less focused on university social activities. Instead, they prioritized academic performance and studying. This shift in attitude among Jewish students led to a transformation in the character of American universities, which the Protestant American elite viewed as a challenge.

Jerome Karabel, a sociologist of the University of California, wrote in "The chosen: The hidden history of admission and exclusion at Harvard, Yale and Princeton" that Jews were seen as socialist proselytizers by nativists, as well as a genetically inferior race by some Americans. Jews were considered unacceptable by some elite social circles, according to Karabel.

Efforts to limit Jewish enrollment began in New York City, a metropolis where the Jewish population accounted for 30% of its inhabitants in the early 20th century. By 1920, Columbia University had a 40% Jewish enrollment rate, as reported by Oliver Pollak. During that time, as most Jewish students were financially disadvantaged, working night jobs to cover tuition costs and residing at home, Columbia University mandated that students live in on-campus dormitories and restricted scholarship opportunities. Additionally, Columbia introduced interviews as part of the admissions process, where university representatives could discern accents or other indicators of Jewish heritage, even if the applicant's name did not explicitly suggest it. According to Oppenheimer, this shift in the university's culture prompted elite Protestant students to withdraw from Columbia. Following the program's introduction, Columbia witnessed a 50% decrease in the number of Jewish students over two years. In 1922, Jews made up approximately 22% of the student body at Harvard University. To address this, Harvard initiated a program focused on geographic diversity, aiming to admit students from states with lower Jewish populations. Historians James Davidson and Deborah Coe assert that Harvard President Abbott Lawrence Lowell was "the most significant proponent of restricting Jewish admissions".

US admissions tests were designed to fit a White Protestant elite education with questions on Classical subjects as well as Greek and Latin, which were not taught in schools where Jews and other immigrants learned. Yale, Dartmouth and other universities introduced legacy admissions that favored the Protestant elite.

According to sociologist Stephen Steinberg, Jews were most commonly restricted through character and psychological exams. Jews were often given descriptors that were in contrast to the values which the universities sought, and those Jews who managed to prove they exhibited such values were considered "pushy". School administrators who were mostly Protestant would characterize Jews with stereotypes and prevent their entry to universities.

Over the winter of 1939–1940, a literature professor at Hunter College of the City University of New York, Max Otto Koischwitz, gave a series of antisemitic lectures and, as a result, was first put on mandatory leave and then resigned. He returned to his birth country of Germany and was employed by the Reichs-Rundfunk-Gesellschaft as a propagandist until his death from tuberculosis several years later.

Stanford University, under President Marc Tessier-Lavigne, admitted in 2022 to having limited the admission of Jewish students in the 1950s, which he called "appalling antisemitic behavior". According to the Stanford committee, Stanford stopped or limited recruiting students from schools with high ratios of Jewish students. Between 1949 and 1952, following the introduction of the quota, for example, the number of students enrolled from Beverly Hills High School declined from 67 to 20, while Fairfax declined from 20 to 1. Stanford also misled investigations, parents and alumni who inquired for decades.

In the 1970s, quotas on Jews gradually disappeared, and admission of students of Jewish origin rose in American higher education.

== 21st century ==
In 2001, the Boycott, Divestment and Sanctions (BDS) movement was established by anti Israel NGOs at the Durban Conference in South Africa. In 2005, the BDS movement began to pressure American universities to cut ties with Israeli academics and Israel. Although such efforts mostly failed, the US Civil Rights Commission issued a report in 2005, which states that "antisemitism persists on college campuses and is often cloaked as criticism of Israel". Jewish students were said to feel isolated and targeted for harassment by BDS activists often.

=== Reinterpretation of Title VI ===
Attorney Kenneth L. Marcus, while working at the Office for Civil Rights of the US Department of Education (2004–2008), reinterpreted Title VI of the Civil Rights Act of 1964, which had been established to protect against racial discrimination in Jim Crow laws affecting education, to include protections against discrimination on the basis of religion, particularly "when an affected student's 'shared ancestry' would have been treated as a 'race' in earlier jurisprudence." According to Jason Brownlee, Marcus "subsequently became one of the preeminent advocates for applying Title VI against speech and events criticizing Israeli repression of Palestinians, deeds Marcus considered antisemitic," and advocated for the adoption of the IHRA definition of antisemitism.

In 2022, the American Jewish Congress released a report stating that a third of Jewish students felt unsafe or uncomfortable on campus due to their Jewish identity.

In Autumn 2023, before the October 7 attack, a Palestinian literature festival was held on the University of Pennsylvania (Penn)'s campus. Critics of the event pointed to controversial guests, including Roger Waters, who had called for the destruction of Israel as well as used antisemitic language.

=== During the Gaza war ===
Following the start of the Gaza war in 2023, there were protests led by pro-Palestinian student groups. In an article about the student protests, Jonathan Chait noted that most pro-Palestinian protesters do not "engage in anti-semitic harassment." However, Chait wrote that a Students for Justice in Palestine (SJP) statement celebrated the attack and claimed that all Israeli Jews were legitimate targets. The organization is supported and financially sponsored by the American Muslims for Palestine, which, according to the Foundation for Defense of Democracies, is linked to Hamas. A bipartisan group of lawmakers called for a federal investigation into SJP's funding. Columbia University and Rutgers University suspended their SJP chapters in late 2023.

On November 1, 2023, amid a rise in antisemitic incidents at college campuses, two dozen major law firms submitted a letter to 14 American law school deans, reminding them that the firms have "zero tolerance policies for any form of discrimination or harassment, much less the kind that has been taking place on some law school campuses."

In December 2023, the Presidents of Harvard, MIT and Penn testified before Congress regarding the state of antisemitism in their universities. They were asked if "calling for the genocide of Jews" is against the codes of conduct in Penn, MIT and Harvard. The three presidents answered that it was a violation depending on the context. The President of Harvard, Claudine Gay, and the President of Penn, Lizz Magill, subsequently resigned following criticism. In August 2024, Columbia President Minouche Shafik also resigned following criticism, and this came alongside the resignations of three Columbia deans who were accused of sending text messages with antisemitic tropes. In December 2023, the United States Congress launched an investigation into antisemitism at American universities.

In late 2023, a protest that began on the outskirts of Penn's campus resulted in the targeting of a Jewish-owned restaurant in Philadelphia with chants of "genocide". The New York Times reported that some Jews at Harvard had stopped wearing openly Jewish headwear, with author Mark Oppenheimer commenting that seeing "newly resurgent antisemitism against this backdrop of fairly recent, wonderful acceptance is a very, very painful thing for a lot of Jews". After her resignation, Claudine Gay apologized for her testimony before Congress. One Jewish student told the New York Times that some students may have different definitions for their chants and gave the benefit of the doubt. Another student remarked that after October 7, there had been a major shift and felt the campus was an alien place, saying his classmates explicitly praised Hamas and denied the rape and abduction of Israeli women.

In February 2024, the American Jewish Congress released its report, "State of Antisemitism in America 2023", reporting that 44% of Jewish students were affected by antisemitism on campus. 25% of Jewish students reported avoiding wearing or displaying items that could identify them as Jewish. More than 50% of Jewish students reported feeling excluded from other students more than once.

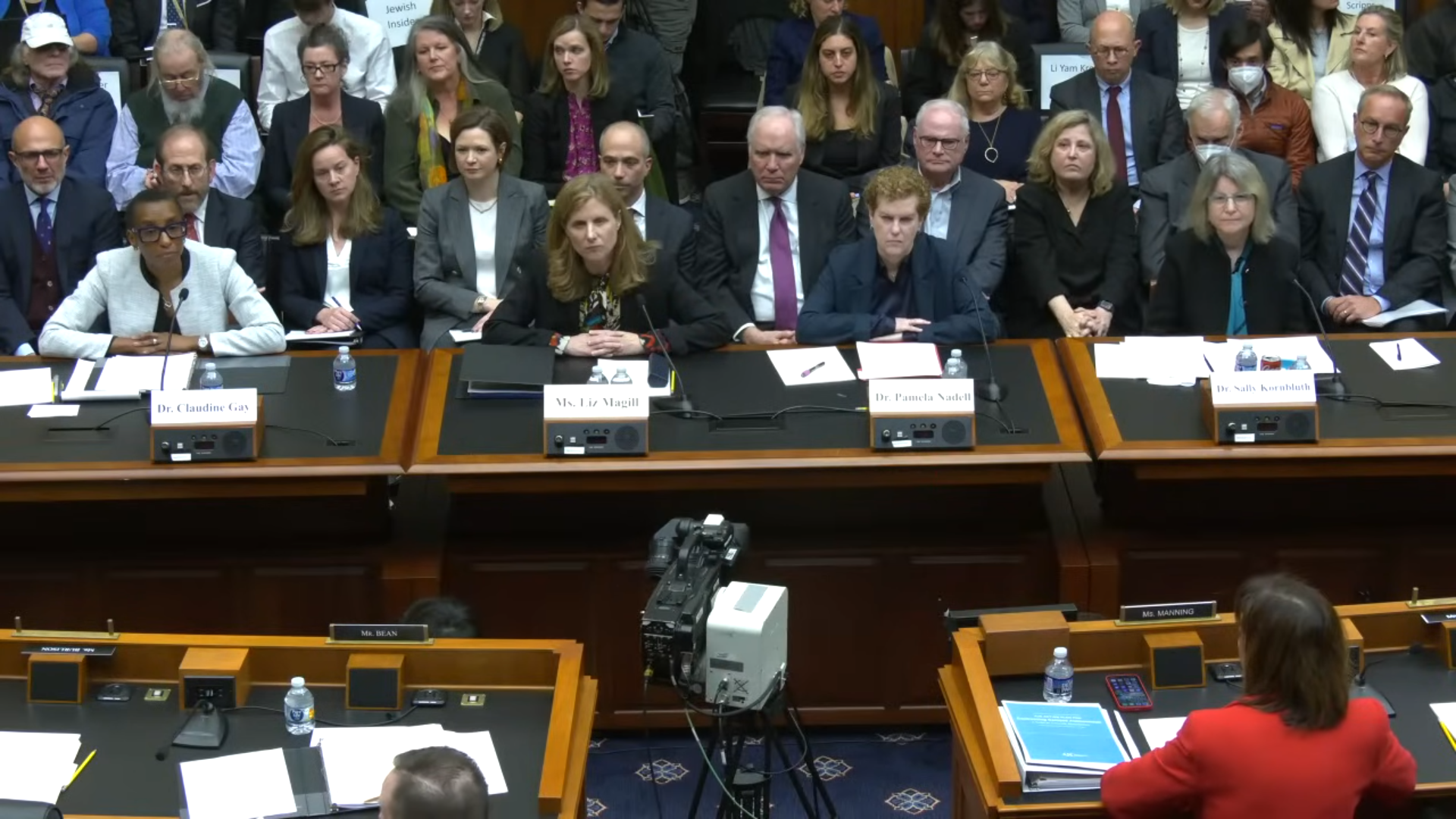
December 2023, antisemitism hearing in Congress

A June 2024 report from a task force commissioned by the acting president of Harvard concluded that antisemitism is indeed a major issue on campus, and suggested several ways to combat it. In August 2024, a federal judge "found plausible accusations that Harvard was deliberately indifferent toward Jewish and Israeli students who said they feared for their safety after facing severe and pervasive harassment". He ruled that the university must face the lawsuit brought against it. Later, in January 2025, Harvard agreed to a settlement that included implementing mandatory antisemitism training for all faculty and staff, creating a new office to address religious intolerance, and establishing a fund to support Jewish and Israeli students' safety and well-being. The settlement was widely regarded as a landmark decision for addressing antisemitism on university campuses and prompted similar actions at other institutions.

In 2024, US President Joe Biden condemned antisemitism on campuses.

Some pro-Palestinian students called for an intifada, as well as calling for Hamas brigades to kill Israeli soldiers. Some protestors called to burn Tel Aviv, a major Israeli city, to the ground. Anti-Israel activists also sang "Oh Hamas, our beloved, strike strike Tel Aviv". Some students also chanted, "Go Hamas, we love you. We support your rockets too". The Jews of New York Instagram shared a video of a woman protestor with a sign reading "Al-Qassam's next targets" pointing toward a counter protest waving Israeli and American flags.

Anti-Israel protestors also called for Jews on campus to "Go back to Europe, you have no culture. All you do is colonize". A counter protest was taunted with calls of "Jews" and "Go back to Poland". According to the Jerusalem Post, a Jewish counter-protestor tried to stop anti-Israel activists from burning an Israeli flag while another Jew was splashed with water. The anti-Israel protestors also proclaimed "From the water to the water (a reference to the Jordan River and the Mediterranean), Palestine is Arab", which is a call for the cleansing of the region of Jews and the denial of Jewish rights for self-sovereignty in their ancestral homeland.

Jewish students in Columbia reported feeling unsafe, being spat on and feeling relieved at leaving the university. A student told the Jerusalem Post that they felt their student representatives did not represent their grievances. A protester yelled at Jewish students, "The 7th of October is going to be every day for you!" Seth Mandel wrote in Commentary that universities were teaching students that Jews must be supplanted from their homes because they represent a race that belongs elsewhere, which, according to Mandel, is the reason why Jews were told to go back to Poland by students in Columbia.

The Anti-Defamation League graded 85 American universities in 2024 regarding policies to protect Jewish students from antisemitism on campus. Twelve universities, including Harvard, MIT, Stanford, the University of Chicago, Princeton and others, received an F. Two schools received an A. Columbia and Penn received a D in the ADL ranking. Brandeis University and Elon University received an A in the ADL ranking.

Two major Christian universities - Indiana Wesleyan University (IWU) in Marion, Indiana and Colorado Christian University (CCU) in Lakewood, Colorado - issued a letter in July 2024 condemning campus antisemitism and promising to protect the safety of Jewish students on their campuses.

In July 2024, UCLA was ordered by a court to develop a plan to protect Jewish students on campus; in August, a federal judge issued a preliminary injunction that the university must prevent pro-Palestinian protesters from blocking Jewish students from accessing classes and other parts of campus. That month, the University of Wisconsin also suspended five pro-Palestinian groups from campus after calls to label Jewish organizations as "extremist criminals". In August 2024, the US Department of Education Office for Civil Rights found that Drexel University failed to address the anti-Jewish hostile climate on campus adequately.

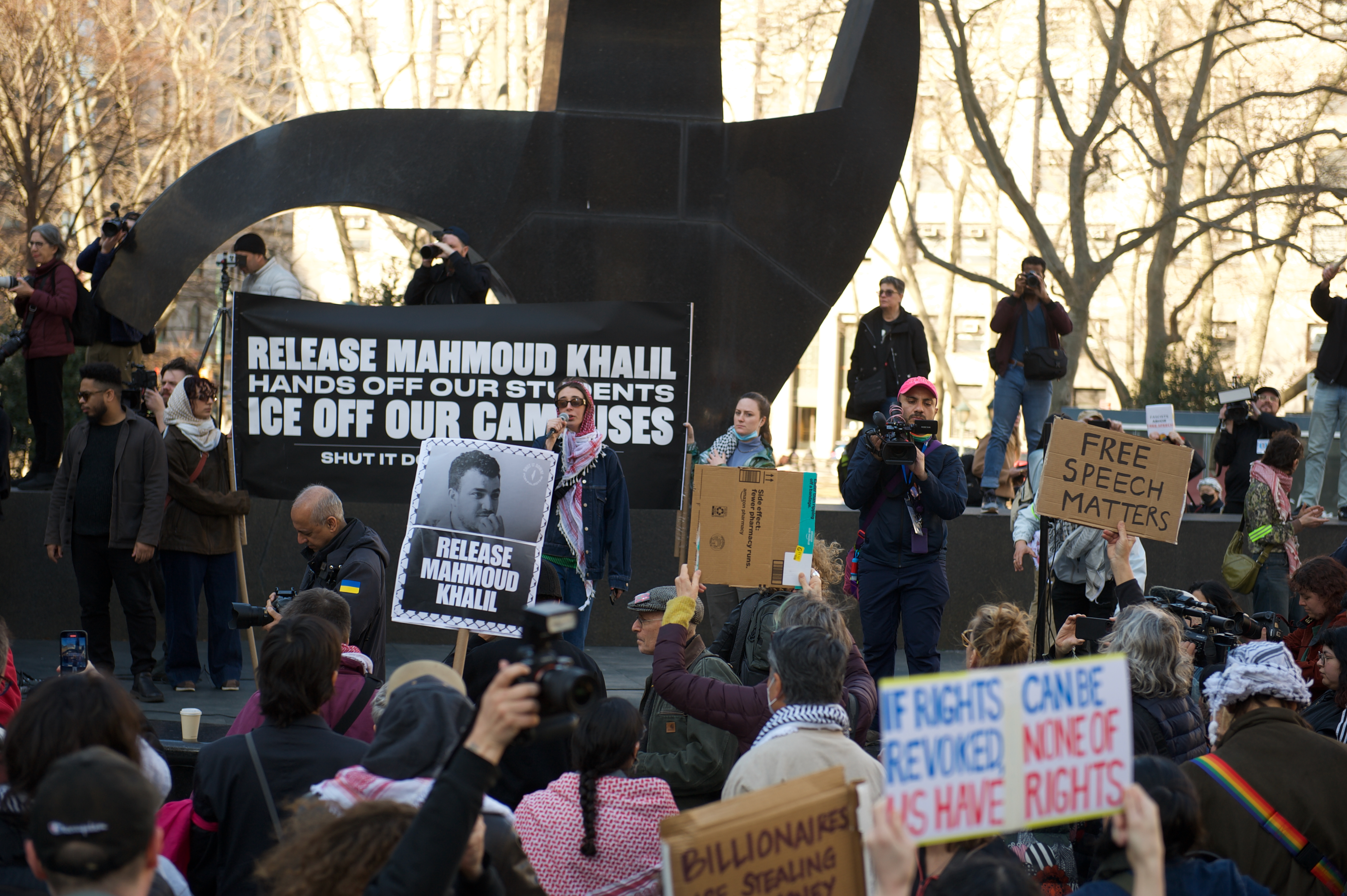
Protest against the detention of Mahmoud Khalil, who was charged with antisemitism, New York City on March 10, 2025

In August 2024, New York University updated its discrimination policy so that speech that would be considered discriminatory when addressing Jews or Israelis will also be considered discriminatory when substituting the term "Zionist". Columbia University restricted campus access amid 'reports of potential disruptions' at the beginning of the new semester. Anti-Israel activists also vandalized Cornell University on the first day of classes. Also in August 2024, MIT denounced the distribution of 'antisemitic' "Mapping Project" flyers at orientation. MIT President Sally Kornbluth said that while she supports free speech, she thought the flyers promoted antisemitism and made some students feel uncomfortable.

An August 2024 study published by the Cohen Center for Modern Jewish Studies of Brandeis University assessed survey results from undergraduate students at 60 schools with large Jewish populations, finding that one-third of non-Jewish college students in the U.S. endorsed antisemitic or anti-Israel views.

In September 2024, the Anti-Defamation League further rated universities with the highest reported incidents of anti-Israel harassment and attacks: Columbia University (52), University of Michigan, Ann Arbor (38), Harvard University (36), University of California, Berkeley (36), University of California, Los Angeles (UCLA) (35), Rutgers University, New Brunswick (33), Stanford University (30), Cornell University (27), University of Washington (26), and University of North Carolina, Chapel Hill (25).

In September 2024, the University of Pennsylvania announced a new office to fight religious intolerance. An independent investigation ordered by New York Governor Kathy Hochul into antisemitism at CUNY called for a "complete overhaul" of the system's policies related to antisemitism; Hochul furthermore directed CUNY to use the IHRA working definition of antisemitism in assessing antisemitism claims. This was coupled with a report detailing a 10-month investigation into antisemitism at CUNY, published by Former New York Chief Judge Jonathan Lippman, also calling for an overhaul of CUNY's system in addressing antisemitism. In parallel, CUNY Jewish students shared a first-hand account of campus antisemitism with Congressman Ritchie Torres and New York City Mayor Eric Adams at a roundtable at New York City Hall.

In October 2024, the U.S. House Education and the Workforce Committee released a report titled Antisemitism on College Campuses Exposed, finding antisemitism to be a widespread issue in American higher education. The report highlighted failures to address what it described as antisemitic behavior in relation to Gaza war protests at universities by university leaders, faculty members, and student groups, saying that such actors sometimes 'legitimized and fomented antisemitism in classrooms and on campus grounds.' The report also pointed to the failure of many universities in effectively enforcing disciplinary policies, leaving Jewish students vulnerable to harassment and hostile learning environments. Inside Higher Ed described the report's findings as characterizing campus antisemitism as "systemic," while Jewish Insider notes the role certain faculty and student organizations had in supporting antisemitic sentiment.

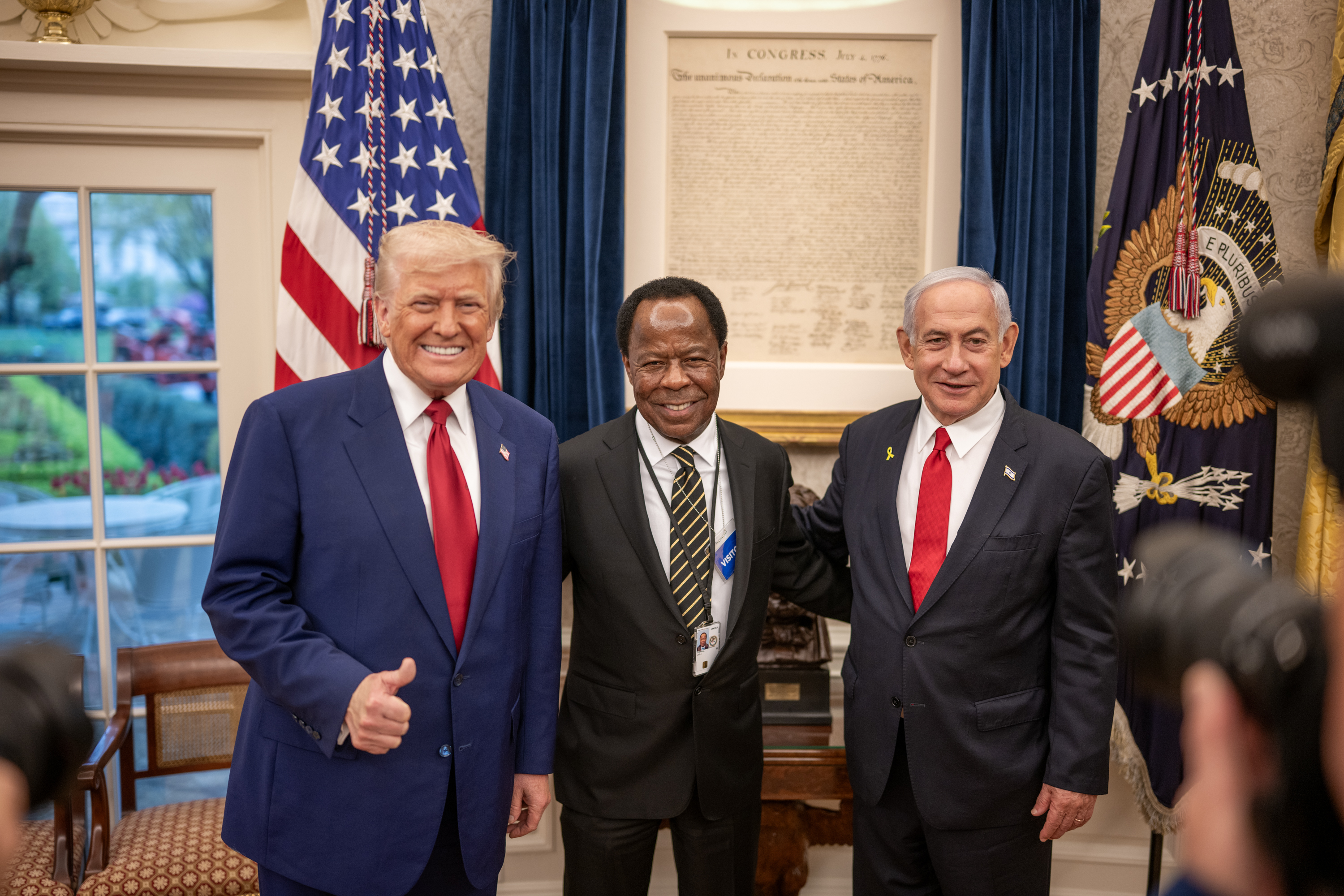
Leo Terrell, the head of the Trump administration's Task Force to Combat Antisemitism, with Donald Trump and Israeli Prime Minister Benjamin Netanyahu at the White House, April 7, 2025

In February 2025, Leo Terrell, the head of the Trump administration's Task Force to Combat Antisemitism, announced he would be investigating Columbia University, Harvard University, George Washington University, Johns Hopkins University, New York University, Northwestern University, Berkeley University, the University of California, the University of Minnesota, and the University of Southern California as part of a broader DOJ investigation against antisemitism on college campuses.

In May 2025, Temple University student Mohammed Adnan Khan ("Mo Khan") and another student were suspended following an incident at the Barstool Samson bar in Philadelphia, where they displayed a sign that said "F— the Jews" while ordering bottle service. Khan claimed that Jews were victimizing him for having posted a video of the sign and said the sign didn't kill Jews, while Israel does kill people. Dave Portnoy, the owner of Barstool Sports, offered him the chance to make amends, but he refused and proceeded to go on a white supremacist podcast hosted by alt-right internet personality Stew Peters. Khan doubled down on his antisemitism by further blaming Jews for his issues and agreed with Peters' call to "join forces against Jewish supremacy."

In February 2026, the U.S. Department of Justice sued the University of California, alleging that UCLA failed to protect Jewish and Israeli employees from a "hostile work environment". The lawsuit claimed the university's administration "turned a blind eye" to antisemitic acts and did not discipline individuals involved in unlawful campus encampments. The following month, a coalition of 115 advocacy groups signed a petition addressed to the UC Board of Regents, noting a switch from student-led to faculty-led antisemitism, propelling the university to disallow academic departments from using university resources and branding to promote political agendas that contributed to student harassment.

== See also ==
- Antisemitism in Columbia University
- Universities and antisemitism
- Mothers Against College Antisemitism
