= Unorthodox (podcast) =

Jewish podcast

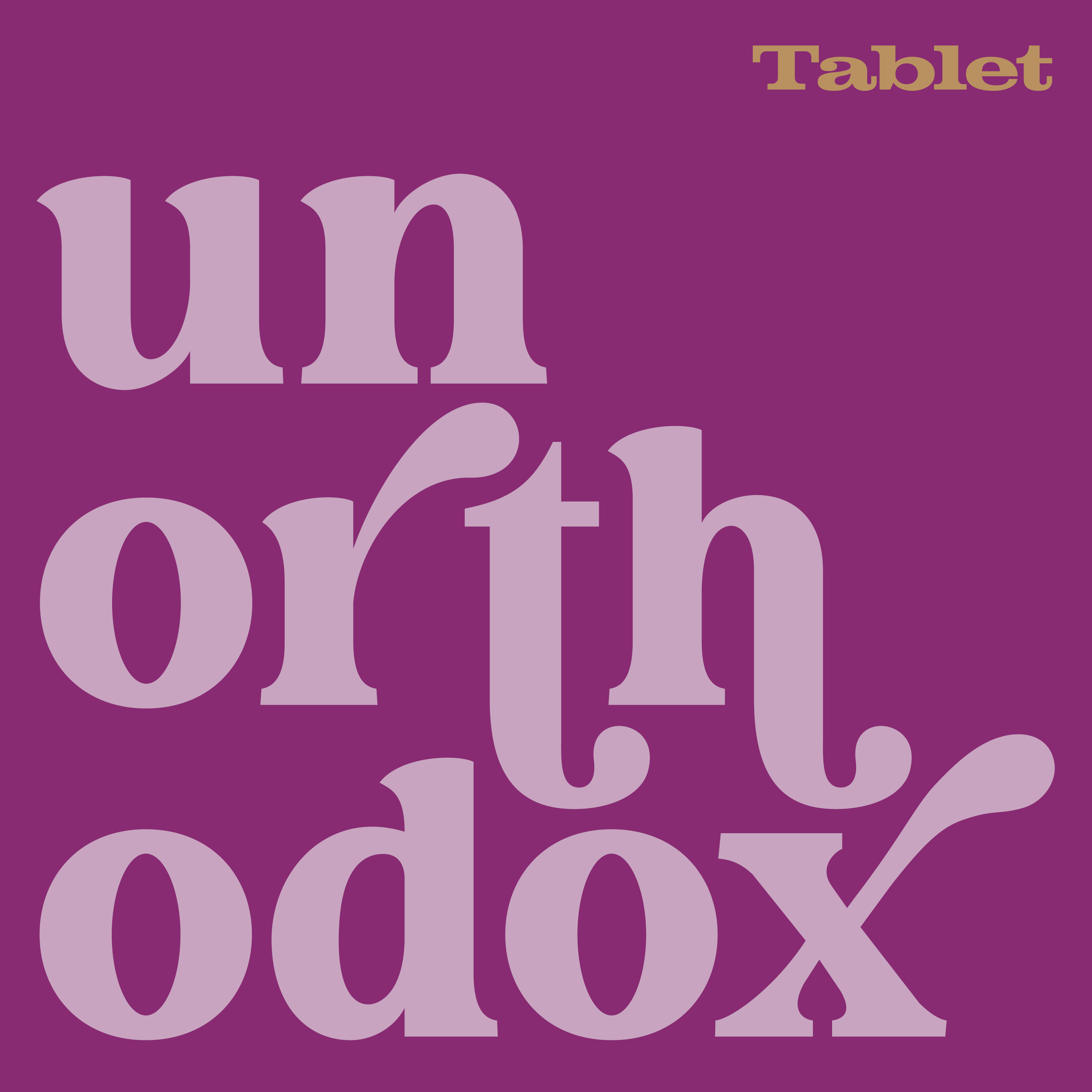
- Genre: Religion and spirituality podcast
- Language: English

Cast and voices
- Hosted by: Stephanie Butnick; Liel Leibovitz; Joshua Malina

Publication
- No. of episodes: 418
- Original release: July 17, 2015 – June 27, 2024
- Provider: Tablet

Related
- Related shows: Rootless
- Website: www.tabletmag.com/podcasts/unorthodox/

Unorthodox is a podcast that discusses news, culture, and politics related to Judaism. It was produced by Tablet from 2015 to 2024.

== Background ==
The podcast was started in 2015 when Mark Oppenheimer pitched the idea to Tablet Magazine

The podcast is recorded in front of a live audience in New York City. The podcast received a grant from the Jim Joseph Foundation. On November 5, 2018, the podcast recorded a live episode at the Mandel Jewish Community Center in Beachwood, Ohio as part of the Cleveland Jewish Book Festival. The live show featured a guest appearance from David Gilbert, the CEO and president of Destination Cleveland and Greater Cleveland Sports Commission. Oppenheimer did an interview with New Voices.

In 2020, Unorthodox marked its 250th episode.

On June 27, 2024, the podcast went on hiatus. On October 2, 2024, Leibovitz announced that Unorthodox was ending, and would be replaced as Tablet's main podcast by Rootless.

== Hosts ==
The podcast was hosted by:

- Stephanie Butnick: Butnick served as deputy editor of Tablet and co-founder of its podcast network, Tablet Studios. She studied Religion at Duke and NYU and has written for The New York Times, The Washington Post, and The Wall Street Journal. She is the founder of Jewish lifestyle media company GOLDA.
- Liel Leibovitz: Leibovitz was a senior writer for and is now editor-at-large for Tablet, media critic and video-games expert. He earned his PhD from Columbia and has written books including Stan Lee: A Life in Comics.
- Joshua Malina: Malina was announced as a new co-host replacing Mark Oppenheimer on May 18, 2023.

=== Additional Personalities ===
Josh Kross, producer

=== Former Host ===
One of the original hosts was Mark Oppenheimer: Oppenheimer is a writer and the director of the Yale Journalism Initiative. Oppenheimer earned his Ph.D.and B.A. from Yale. He has been a news reporter, magazine writer, and essayist and has written six books, including Wisenheimer (about his years as a high school debater) and Squirrel Hill: The Tree of Life Synagogue Shooting and the Soul of a Neighborhood. Oppenheimer's final episode as host of the podcast was on April 27, 2023.

== Format ==
The hosts talk about Jewish culture, politics, and news with weekly guests. The show is generally light hearted, but does cover difficult topics like the Pittsburgh synagogue shooting. The show also covers controversial topics such as Jewish girls getting rhinoplasty. The show provides a content warning for swearing and has regular "Jew of the week" and "Gentile of the week" segments. Guests on the show have included CEOs David Gilbert and Terry Stewart. One episode featured historian Alan Robert Ginsburg and Israeli cooking personality Gil Hovav, while another featured Jesuit priest James Martin and comedian Judy Gold.

=== Segments ===
- Introduction: Weekly personal anecdotes from the hosts
- News of the Jews
- Jew of the Week (JOTW): Interview with Jewish individual
- Gentile of the Week (GOTW): Interview with non-Jewish individual
- Mailbox
- Mazel Tovs: Congratulations and shout-outs to notable Jews and fans of the show

Jews of the Week

- Actress and Neuroscientist Mayim Bialik
- Colorado Governor Jared Polis
- Rabbi Charlie Cytron-Walker, clergy at the synagogue in Colleyville, Texas who was taken hostage
- Rabbi Mike Moskowitz, Orthodox rabbi at the world's largest LGBTQ synagogue, Congregation Beit Simchat Torah
- Senator Joe Lieberman
- Andrew Rehfeld, Ph.D., President of Hebrew Union College-Jewish Institute of Religion
- David Bezmozgis, writer for the popular Canadian sci-fi TV show Orphan Black
- David Gilbert, president and CEO of the Greater Cleveland Sports Commission and Destination Cleveland

Gentiles of the Week

- Great British Baking Show contestant Jürgen Krauss
- Presbyterian Pastor Henry Brinton
- Former NBA player and coach Paul Westphal
- Julie Nesrallah, the opera singer and host of CBC Radio 2's Tempo classical music program
- Sister Julia Walsh of the Marywood Franciscan Spirituality Center in northern Wisconsin
- Father Thomas Soroka, Eastern Orthodox priest from St. Nicholas Orthodox Church, Pittsburgh
- Terry Stewart, former CEO of the Rock and Roll Hall of Fame and Museum in Cleveland

== Episodes ==
=== Annual Special Episodes ===
- Apology episode coinciding with the High Holy Days
- Conversion episode coinciding with Shavuot
- Passover Episode coinciding with Passover

Hal Karp was featured as a guest on the show for the 2018 annual apology episode on Yom Kippur. In the episode Karp told the story of how he mended his relationship with his brother and expressed regret for not repairing relationships with others he had hurt. After sharing the episode on Facebook his ex-wife, Irene Sibaja, reconnected with him and they were remarried on December 6, 2018, at the Emanu-El Temple in Dallas Texas. The three hosts read four of the seven blessings recited at the wedding.

== Live events ==
The podcast was in residency for several years at the Marlene Meyerson JCC Manhattan. The podcast also did a live show at the Slifka Center for Jewish Life on October 13, 2015. The podcast did a live show at Jewish Community Center of San Francisco on September 23, 2019. The show did a live episode in Pittsburgh. The podcast did a live show in Detroit. The podcast did a live show in Phoenix at the Sun Jewish Community Center on December 9, 2019.

== Reception ==
The podcast was named one of the 50 best podcasts of the year in 2016 by The Guardian. The show was included on Moment Magazine's list of the "Top Ten Jewish Podcasts". The show was included on Washington Jewish Week's list of "7 Jewish podcasts you should add to your rotation". Jetzt called Unorthodox "the world's best-known Jewish podcast".

It is listened to in 11 countries with more than six million downloads; a fan Facebook page includes more than 6,000 members.

== Adaptations ==
The hosts of the show published a book entitled The Newish Jewish Encyclopedia: From Abraham to Zabar's and Everything in Between and went on a book tour together.
