= Mark Oppenheimer =

American author

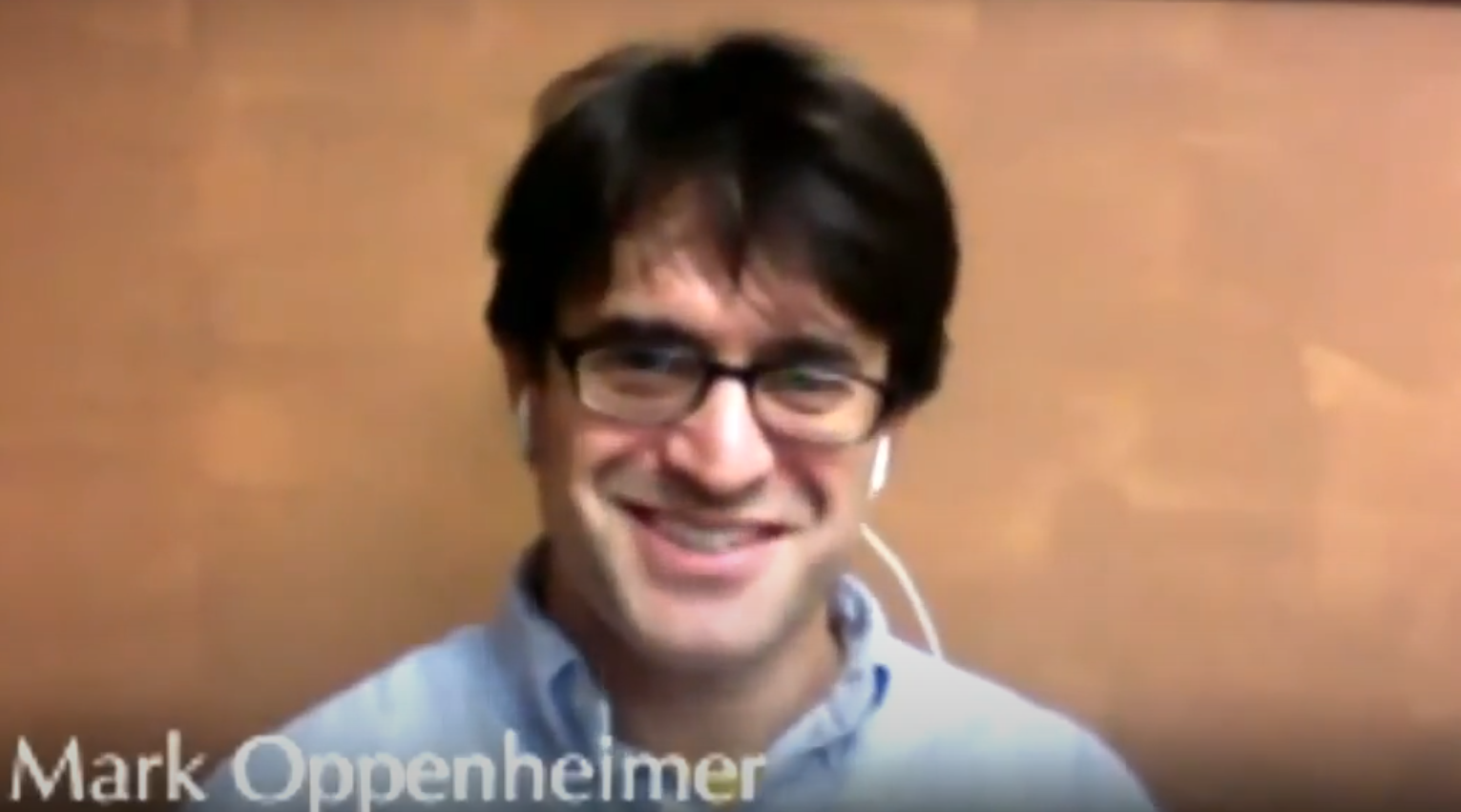
Oppenheimer in 2014

Mark Oppenheimer is an American author.

== Career ==
Oppenheimer is the executive editor of Arc Magazine, an online journal of the John C. Danforth Center on Religion and Politics at Washington University in St. Louis. He is the former Beliefs columnist for The New York Times, and has contributed to numerous magazines, including The Nation, Mother Jones, The New Republic, Tablet, and The New York Times Magazine. He was the editor at large of Tablet magazine. He co-founded the podcast Unorthodox and co-hosted it from 2015 to 2023.

== Personal life ==
Oppenheimer is Jewish, and regularly attends a conservative synagogue. He was born and grew up in a secular Jewish home in Springfield, Massachusetts. He studied at Yale University and holds a Ph.D. in American religious history from Yale. He is married and has five children. He lives in New Haven, Connecticut.

== Books ==
- Judy Blume: A Life (2026).
- Squirrel Hill: The Tree of Life Synagogue Shooting & the Soul of a Neighborhood (2021)
- The Passover Haggadah: An Ancient Story for Modern Times (2020). With Stephanie Butnick and Alana Newhouse.
- The Newish Jewish Encyclopedia (2019). With Liel Leibovitz and Stephanie Butnick.
- The Bar Mitzvah Crasher: Road-Tripping Through Jewish America
- Wisenheimer: A Childhood Subject to Debate
- Knocking on Heaven's Door: American Religion in the Age of Counterculture (2003)
