= Ronnie Leibowitz =

Israeli criminal

Ronnie Leibovitz
- רוני ליבוביץ
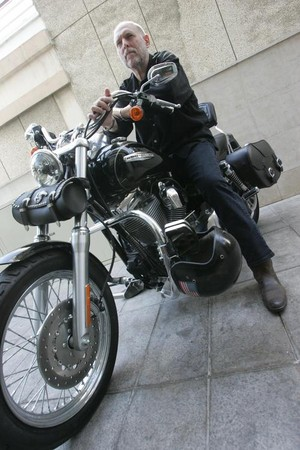
- Born: August 24, 1954 (age 72); Israel
- Children: Liel Leibovitz

Ronnie Leibovitz (Hebrew: רוני ליבוביץ) is a convicted Israeli bank robber, nicknamed Ofnobank (a blend word of the words "motorcycle" and "bank" in Hebrew), due to his reported theft methods. In English, this moniker has been translated as Bikerbank or the Motorcycle Bandit.

== Background ==
Leibowitz was born in Israel to Yehoshua and Dvora Leibowitz, the oldest of three sons. He was born into one of the wealthiest families of industrialists in Israel. He grew up in the Tel Ganim neighborhood of Ramat Gan, attending the local school before being sent to boarding school at the Hadasim youth village, where he studied for a year and a half. Following that, he went through a number of schools, but by the age of 16 stopped his schooling and went to work. In 1970, he began his military service in the Israel Defense Forces. In June 1973, he completed an officer's course at Bahad 1 and became a logistics officer. He was stationed in the south during the Yom Kippur War. During his military service he married Iris, and their son Liel was born.

In the late 1970s, he joined the family business, which operated in Israel and the United States, and had homes in Herzliya Pituah and Manhattan. In the late 1980s, he quarreled with his family and left the family business. According to police, he also went into debt, although Leibowitz denies this. He then began his spree of bank robberies.

== Bank robberies ==
Between 1989 and 1990, Leibowitz robbed 21 bank branches, mostly in the Tel Aviv area, stealing around $400,000. His first robbery was at the First International Bank branch in Herzliya Pituah on February 21, 1989. With his identity still unknown, he quickly became Israel's most adulated outlaw. According to Haaretz, he became a folk hero "portrayed as part Robin Hood, part sex symbol." It was widely reported that he used a motorcycle to enter and escape banks, and then hid the motorcycle in a truck readied for that purpose in advance. However, Leibowitz claimed that he never actually used a motorcycle, and that it was a media invention. Rather, he committed the robberies while wearing a crash helmet and windbreaker to disguise himself. After each robbery, he casually walked outside and placed the helmet with the windbreaker stuffed into it in a nearby alleyway, then headed back to the bank and slipped into the crowd of curious onlookers who had in the meantime gathered outside the bank before being ordered away by the police. Leibowitz calculated that the police would not expect to find the perpetrator still at the scene of the crime. He would wait until police removed roadblocks set up in the vicinity, retrieve his helmet and windbreaker, and go home with the money tucked in his shirt. Although he would threaten the teller with a pistol, he never harmed anyone during his robberies, and would only fire a single shot into the air.

Police launched stakeouts and set up roadblocks in an effort to catch him. Dozens of bikers were questioned, leading many bikers to adorn their motorcycles and helmets with stickers proclaiming "I'm not the robber." At least four suspects were detained on suspicion of being the Ofnobank, among them a reserve Israeli Air Force officer, and Leibowitz twice committed robberies while suspects were being held. The Ofnobank was speculated to potentially be a former commando or former policeman.

On October 7, 1990, Leibowitz committed his last robbery at the Bank Hapoalim branch in Ramat Gan. That same month, he was arrested near his parents' home outside a bank which he claims he wasn't even planning to rob.

== Aftermath ==
When questioned, Leibovitz admitted to all his bank robberies and cooperated fully with police investigators. A few days after his capture, he returned all the stolen money. His wife Iris divorced him shortly after his arrest. He was sentenced to twenty years in prison, but his sentence was reduced to 14 years upon appeal to the Supreme Court of Israel. The prosecution agreed to this reduction as well. After serving eight years in prison, he was granted a presidential pardon and released. His attorney was Michal Herzog, wife of Israel's later President Isaac Herzog.

Following his release, he married Yasmin Merhav, whom he had met during a prison furlough, and came to run his own logistics business. In 2018, his son Liel shared his memories of his father and his exploits in a podcast.
