= Israel Story =

- Israel Story logo
- Other names: Sipur Israeli
- Genre: Radio short stories and essays
- Running time: 30-60 minutes
- Country of origin: Israel
- Languages: English and Hebrew
- Home station: Galey Tzhal
- Syndicates: Public Radio Exchange, Tablet Magazine
- Hosted by: Mishy Harman
- Created by: Mishy Harman; Shai Satran; Ro’ee Gilron; Yochai Maital
- Written by: Various
- Produced by: Mishy Harman; Shai Satran; Ro’ee Gilron; Yochai Maital; Julie Subrin; Maya Kosover; Benny Becker; Shoshi Shmuluvitz
- Website: www.israelstory.org
- Podcast: Israel Story Podcast Archive

Israel Story or Sipur Israeli (Hebrew: סיפור ישראלי) is an Israeli radio show and podcast. Israel Story produces episodes in both English and Hebrew. The Hebrew show, which began production in 2013, is broadcast on Galei Tzahal, Israel's national Army Radio station. The English version, which began production in 2014, is distributed by Public Radio Exchange (PRX) as a bi-weekly podcast. Israel Story partnered with Tablet magazine to distribute its first six seasons of English episodes and then partnered with The Times of Israel.

== Concept ==
Hosted by Mishy Harman, Israel Story airs long-form nonfiction content about the people of Israel. The show was originally inspired by This American Life, and episodes are structured similarly—each has a theme and several stories that connect to that theme.

== History ==
During a 20,000-kilometer (12,400 mile) road trip across the United States, host Mishy Harman was introduced to the popular radio show, This American Life hosted by Ira Glass. Harman soon became addicted to the show's compelling human-interest stories. When Harman returned home to Jerusalem after the road trip, he convinced three childhood friends to join him in creating an Israeli podcast based on This American Life's style of storytelling.

On 19 July 2013, the Israel Story team released its first episode. Initially, they hoped to just make a few shows for friends and family to enjoy. They then made a show about House of Pancakes, a famous 24-hour pancake restaurant in Israel, which went viral and they reached a critical mass of listeners. The show caught the ear of Army Radio station head Yaron Deckel, who decided to give them a regular, Friday afternoon broadcast slot. Each of the first season's eleven episodes reached an audience of hundreds of thousands of Israelis. In 2014, Israel Story expanded into English, releasing its first English episode, "Faking It" on 18 August 2014 in partnership with Tablet magazine. In December 2022, The Times of Israel announced its partnership with Israel Story for the upcoming seventh season.

=== Creators ===
Four childhood friends who grew up together in the Masorti (Conservative) youth movement, "No'am", created the show.

- Mishy Harman narrates the show. Harman studied at both Harvard and Cambridge University and received his PhD from the Hebrew University of Jerusalem.
- Ro'ee Gilron, a graduate of Brandeis University, co-founded a technology start up with Harman. After working at a NASA Lab conducting experiments in zero gravity environments, he returned to Israel to begin his Ph.D. in neuroscience at Tel Aviv University.
- Shai Satran served in an elite combat unit of the Israeli Army for eight years and recently completed his master's degree in clinical psychology. Shai is an active advocate for women's rights and volunteers at the Jerusalem Rape Crisis Center.
- Yochai Maital was a captain in an elite combat unit of the Israeli Army for eight years. Yochai has built multiple eco-houses and co-founded Tel Aviv's first (and still only) organic food Co-Op.

== Collaborations and rebroadcasts ==
Pieces produced by Israel Story have been heard on NPR stations across the US, including as the Mother's Day special on WNYC (New York's public radio station), and on nationally syndicated shows like Snap Judgment, To the Best of Our Knowledge and 99% Invisible. Collaborations include writers and authors such as Etgar Keret, Sayed Kashua, Jonathan Goldstein, David Eagleman, and Matti Friedman.

== Live shows ==
Multiple times a year, the Israel Story team produces and performs live storytelling events around the United States and Israel. They've performed in New York, Las Vegas, San Diego, New Orleans, Chicago, San Francisco, and Miami.

In a combination of radio-style storytelling, live collage animation, music, singing, video, and other multimedia, Israel Story tells the stories of Israelis from all over the country. In "Herzl 48", Israel Story brings together the stories of Israelis who have one, completely random, thing in common: they all live at 48 Herzl Street—the most common and highly symbolic of all Israeli addresses. (Theodor Herzl is considered the father of modern Zionism and the State of Israel was established in 1948.) Over several months, Israel Story visited all fifty-four Herzl Streets in Israel. Herzl 48 is a live presentation of these stories and has been performed across the United States and Israel.

In May 2016, Israel Story returned to the United States with its new live show, "68 and Counting" in celebration of Yom Ha'atzmaut, Israel's Independence day. Israel Story delved into archives to find tales of events that all took place on Independence day from 1948 all the way through 2016, including stories from extravagant military parades, monumental basketball games, mind-bending bible trivia, and much more. In November 2016 Israel Story will be back in the states with a brand new live show.

== Reception ==
Israel Story was recognized as one of the ‘Top 10 Podcast Episodes of 2014,’ for “Love Syndrome” and was awarded the Best Podcast Concept at IDC Herzliya's FM+ Radio Conference. Israel Story was named as one of the best seven Jewish podcasts by JTA and one of the "Top Ten Jewish Podcast" by Moment Magazine.

== Awards ==
- Top 10 Podcast Episodes (2014) - The People Podcast
- Best Podcast Concept (2015) - IDC Herzliya's FM+ Radio Conference
- Top 7 Jewish Podcasts (2016) - Jewish Telegraphic Agency
- Top Ten Jewish Podcasts (2016) - Moment Magazine

== Donors ==
Steven Spielberg's Righteous Persons Foundation offered funding as part of its Media Fund for Coexistence, which supports projects that leverage media and technology to highlight people's shared humanity.
