= Mothers Against College Antisemitism =

American nonprofit advocacy organization

Mothers Against College Antisemitism (MACA) is an American nonprofit advocacy organization focused on antisemitism at colleges and universities. Attorney Elizabeth Rand founded it as a Facebook group in October 2023 following the October 7 attacks. It attracted more than 42,000 members within weeks and later developed regional chapters.

MACA has organized campaigns directed at university administrators concerning campus demonstrations, divestment proposals and academic programming. Supporters describe the organization as a means of pressuring universities to address antisemitism, while critics argue that some of its campaigns threaten academic freedom and protected political speech.

== History ==
Mothers Against College Antisemitism (MACA) was founded in October 2023 by Elizabeth Rand following the Hamas-led attack on Israel and subsequent concerns about antisemitism on U.S. college campuses. The organization began as a Facebook group for parents of college students and expanded rapidly, attracting more than 42,000 members within weeks of its creation.

Rand said that she modeled the organization in part on Mothers Against Drunk Driving and hoped to turn the online group into an advocacy movement. Early discussions among members included reports of antisemitism on campuses, communication with university administrators, petitions and other forms of advocacy.

By May 2024, The Chronicle of Higher Education reported that MACA had nearly 60,000 members. Members had organized campaigns directed at university administrators, including efforts concerning campus demonstrations, divestment proposals and academic programming.

The MACA Foundation reported approximately $176,000 in revenue and $110,000 in expenses.

== Activities ==
MACA has used its online membership to organize letter-writing and other campaigns directed at colleges and university officials. The Chronicle of Higher Education reported that members advocated for the cancellation of some documentary screenings, opposed university divestment resolutions and supported the removal of pro-Palestinian encampments.

The organization has also been involved in debates over the treatment of foreign students participating in pro-Palestinian demonstrations. In February 2025, Reuters reported that Rand supported the deportation of foreign students who she said were harassing Jewish students and had shared information about an Immigration and Customs Enforcement tip line. Reuters reported that some MACA members left the group over the issue.

Members of the organization participated in the Israel Day on Fifth parade in New York City.

== Reception and criticism ==
MACA's campaigns have drawn both support and criticism. The Chronicle of Higher Education reported that supporters viewed the organization as a way to pressure universities to respond more forcefully to antisemitism, while critics, including some academics, argued that its campaigns could interfere with academic freedom and legitimate political speech.

JTA reported shortly after the group's creation that Julia Jassey, head of Jewish on Campus, welcomed parents' concern about antisemitism but argued that Jewish students themselves were better positioned than parents to address conditions on their campuses.

== Leadership dispute ==
In late 2025 and early 2026, Rand and the board of the MACA Foundation became involved in a dispute over the leadership of the organization and control of its Facebook group. Rand had stepped down from the foundation's board in November 2025 but retained control of the Facebook group. According to eJewishPhilanthropy, the foundation's board subsequently sent Rand a cease-and-desist letter demanding control of organizational assets, including the Facebook group. Rand disputed the board's claims and maintained that she controlled the group. The dispute resumed in July 2026 when the foundation sent Rand another letter threatening litigation over control of the Facebook group. Rand subsequently renamed the group Parents Against College Antisemitism, while the foundation continued to maintain that the group was an organizational asset.

The MACA Foundation is suing the founder Elizabeth Rand over control of the "Mothers Against College Antisemitism" brand and its 60,000-member Facebook group, which the board claims Rand improperly controls. The lawsuit is filed in New York County Supreme Court in July 2026.

== See also ==
- Antisemitism in US higher education
- Antisemitism in the United States
- Antisemitism at Columbia University
