= Alana Newhouse =

American writer and editor

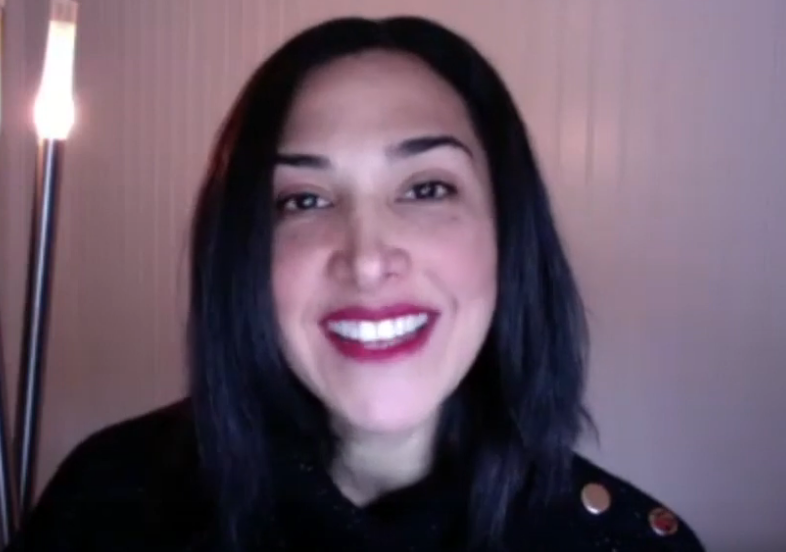
- Born: February 26, 1976 (age 50); Lawrence, Nassau County, New York, U.S.
- Education: Barnard College; Columbia University Graduate School of Journalism
- Occupation: Journalist

Alana Newhouse (born February 26, 1976) is an American writer and editor. She is the founder of Tablet magazine.

== Early life and education ==
Newhouse was born in 1976 and grew up in Lawrence, New York. Her father is Ashkenazi Jewish, and her mother is Sephardic Jewish. She is a graduate of the Hebrew Academy of the Five Towns and Rockaway, a 1997 graduate of Barnard College, and a 2002 graduate of the Columbia University Graduate School of Journalism.

== Career ==
After college, Newhouse worked for political consultant David Garth. Her journalism career began at The Forward, where she was a religion reporter before being named arts and culture editor in 2003. In 2008 she became editor of Nextbook. She established Tablet Magazine for Nextbook in 2009.

Newhouse is a contributor to other media outlets, most notably The New York Times. In April 2010, she reported on a new discovery related to the photography of Roman Vishniac for The New York Times Magazine and, in July 2010, penned a controversial essay on Jewish conversion in Israel for the op-ed page titled "The Diaspora Need Not Apply".

== Personal ==
Newhouse lives in New York City with her husband, David Samuels.

== Books ==
- A Living Lens: Photographs of Jewish life from the pages of the Forward, 2007
