= Esther Fuchs =

Israeli Jewish feminist biblical scholar (born 1953)

- אסתר פוקס
- Born: 1953 (age 72–73); Tel Aviv, Israel

Academic background
- Education: Hebrew University of Jerusalem; Brandeis University
- Thesis: Irony in the Works of S. Y. Agnon (1980)

Academic work
- Discipline: Biblical studies; Judaic studies
- School or tradition: Jewish feminism
- Institutions: University of Texas at Austin; University of Arizona

Esther Fuchs (Note: Pronounced FYOOKS.) (Hebrew: אסתר פוקס; born 1953) is an Israeli Jewish feminist biblical scholar. Fuchs is Professor of Near Eastern Studies and Judaic Studies at the University of Arizona.

== Biography ==
Esther Fuchs was born in Tel Aviv and studied at the Hebrew University of Jerusalem and Brandeis University. She taught at the University of Texas at Austin before moving to the University of Arizona.

Fuchs is the author of Israeli Mythogynies: Women in Contemporary Hebrew Fiction (1987) and Sexual Politics in the Biblical Narrative (2000). She describes her work as an attempt to "depatriarchalize" the Hebrew Bible.

== Selected works ==
- Encounters with Israeli authors, 1982
- Omanut ha-hitamemut : ʻal ha-ironyah shel Shai ʻAgnon, 1985
- Israeli mythogynies : women in contemporary Hebrew fiction, 1987
- Sexual politics in the biblical narrative : reading the Hebrew Bible as a woman, 1989
- Women and the Holocaust : narrative and representation, 1999
- On the cutting edge : the study of women in biblical worlds : essays in honor of Elisabeth Schüssler Fiorenza, 2003
- Feminist theory and the Bible : interrogating the sources, 2016
- Jewish feminism : framed and reframed, 2018
