= Mike Solana =

American writer

- Solana in 2025
- Education: Boston University (BA)
- Organizations: Founders Fund; Pirate Wires

Michael Solana is an American writer and conservative commentator. He is the chief marketing officer of the venture capital firm Founders Fund and the founder of media company Pirate Wires.

== Early life and education ==
Solana attended Boston University, graduating in 2007 with a Bachelor of Arts in English. Solana said he had been interested in libertarianism since high school, but briefly embraced left-wing policies during college before becoming an anarcho-capitalist. (Note: ”At Boston University, Solana grew irritated watching other kids coast. ‘I used to wreck people in class,’ he said. This was his Marxist phase. Solana explains himself during that period as “a boy who realized he wanted to date other boys in the Bush years and needed a place to go where people said, There’s nothing wrong with you.” But then one day in class, he was arguing against property rights when he realized that he didn’t believe what he was saying. He turned back to libertarianism.”)

== Career ==
Solana is the chief marketing officer and vice president at Founders Fund, a venture capital firm founded by Peter Thiel. He is a founder and host of Hereticon, a conference for discussing ideas outside the mainstream.

Solana is a frequent commentator on San Francisco's and California's governance, criticizing the city's alleged leniency on crime. Solana has criticized the political strategy of the abundance movement associated with Ezra Klein and Derek Thompson's 2025 book, arguing that its Democratic proponents would struggle to win over what he called the "Luigi Left".

In the aftermath of the assassination of Charlie Kirk, an editorial in The Wall Street Journal referenced Solana's comments about the "challenge that moderate Democrats face in trying to persuade the extremists in their political coalition to appreciate the virtues of liberty and open debate".

=== Pirate Wires ===
In 2020, Solana founded Pirate Wires, a newsletter-turned-website focused on technology. In "Extract or Die", Solana argued that San Francisco's government was mismanaging the city and that the city would be better run by tech entrepreneurs. An October 2024 profile in The Atlantic described Solana as "The most opinionated man in America" for his writings in Pirate Wires. The blog was described by Jeffrey Goldberg as providing a "really good insight into MAGA thinking in the Silicon Valley, people who are supporting Donald Trump".

== Personal life ==
Solana lives in Miami, Florida. He is openly gay.

== Publications ==
- Citizen Sim: Cradle of the Stars (2014)
