= Ashley Rindsberg =

American writer (born 1981)

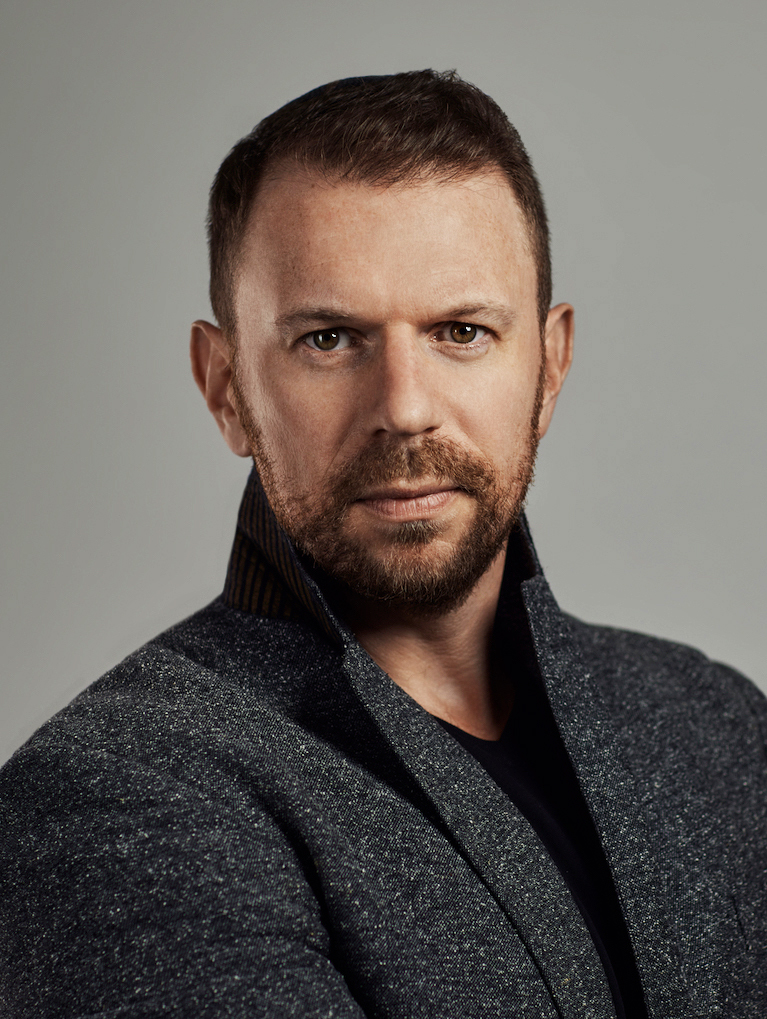
- Rindsberg in 2020
- Born: July 25, 1981 (age 45); Johannesburg, South Africa
- Education: Cornell University (BA)
- Occupation: Writer
- Years active: 2001–present
- Website: www.ashleyrindsberg.com

Ashley Rindsberg (born July 25, 1981) is a South African–born American writer, journalist, and Wikipedia critic. In 2001, he worked with the History of Recent Science and Technology Project at the Dibner Institute for the History of Science and Technology at MIT, and for the Internet Archive on their bookmobile project in 2003.

Rindsberg has contributed to multiple news website including the Huffpost, PragerU, and Pirate Wires as a senior editor. He is the author of Tel Aviv Stories (2011) and The Gray Lady Winked: How The New York Times's Misreporting, Distortions & Fabrications Radically Alter History (2021). Since 2024, Rindsberg has been critical of Wikipedia, accusing it of having bias in its coverage.

== Early life and education ==
Rindsberg was born in Johannesburg, South Africa. He moved to the United States as a child. Rindsberg graduated from Cornell University with a degree in philosophy and a BA in science and technology studies, focusing on the philosophy of science and innovation theory.

== Career ==
=== 2001–persent: Early career and writing ===
In 2001, Rindsberg began working with the History of Recent Science and Technology Project at the Dibner Institute for the History of Science and Technology at MIT. This was a project to digitize the printed archive at the Cornell Center for Materials Science. In May 2003, he was working with the Internet Archive on their bookmobile project. In August, he was in Alexandria to help build one for Bibliotheca Alexandrina. He was a contributor to Huffpost from 2011 to 2017. Rindsberg is also a contributor to The Daily Beast, PragerU, Fox News, and the Israeli newspapers The Jerusalem Post, and The Times of Israel. He announced in October 2024 that he was joining the blog Pirate Wires as a senior editor.

=== 2011–persent: Author ===
After moving to Tel Aviv, Rindsberg published his first book, Tel Aviv Stories, in 2011. The work is a collection of seven fictional short stories based on the people he met while wandering the city's underbelly at night. The Jerusalem Post described Rindsberg's writing as "measured and inviting", with the book displaying a "depth of feeling." Naomi Firestone-Teeter, CEO of the Jewish Book Council, added the book to her recommending reading.

In 2021, Rindsberg wrote about alleged misreporting by The New York Times in his book The Gray Lady Winked: How The New York Times's Misreporting, Distortions & Fabrications Radically Alter History. The book was a response to Rindsberg learning from William Shirer's The Rise and Fall of the Third Reich that, at the outset of World War 2, The New York Times reported Poland invaded Germany. In any case, Rindsberg said he was inspired to write on the history of The Times' mistakes and the ramifications thereof, accusing the paper of "manufacturing false narratives that serve the paper's political interests" in his book.

Max Hunder wrote in the Kyiv Post that the "main body of his work is factual and well-researched and can be read as a reasonable case for the prosecution against the journalistic mistakes" of The New York Times. However, Hunder notes the book's preface was written by controversial professor Mark Crispin Miller, which Rindsberg says he included because the book was about media narratives.

=== Wikipedia coverage ===
NeutralPOV
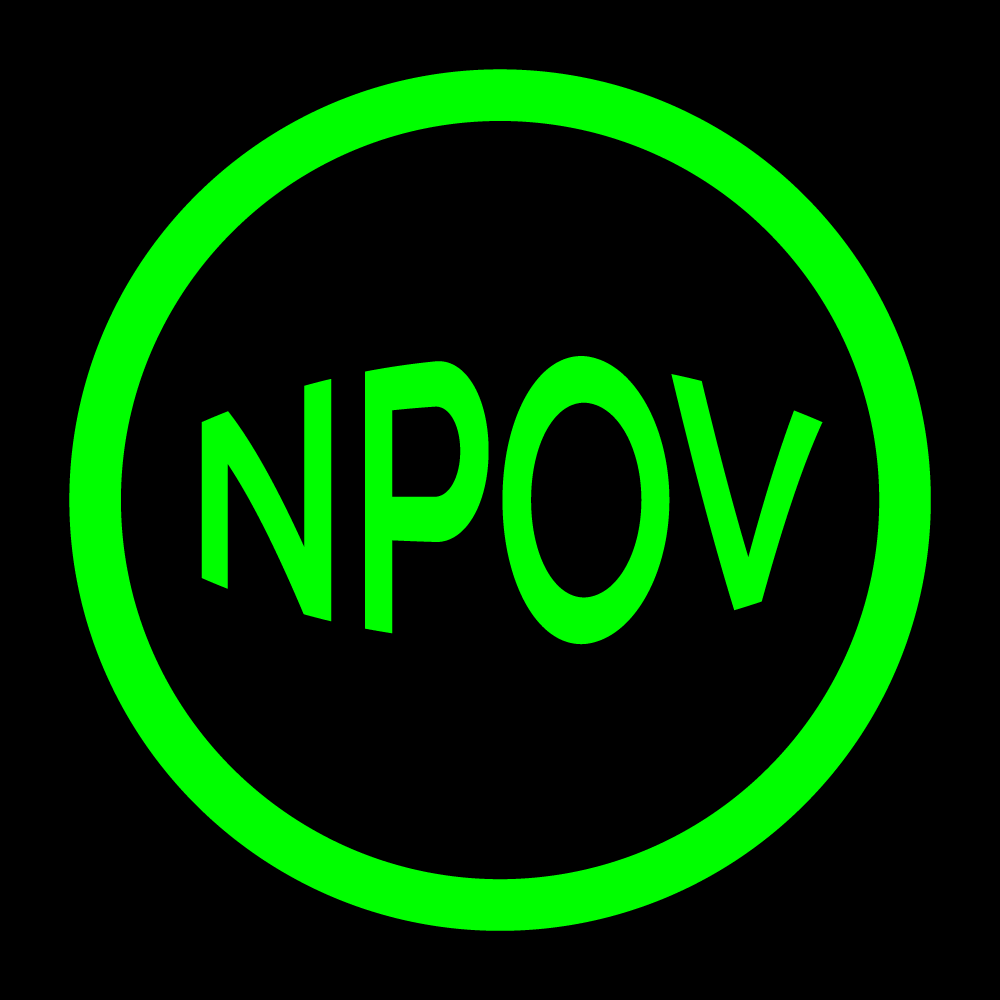
- YouTube avatar for NeutralPOV

YouTube information
- Channel: NPOV
- Years active: 2025–present
- Genre: Criticism of Wikipedia
- Subscribers: 242
- Views: 74.7 thousand
- Last updated: 20 October 2026

Since 2024, Rindsberg has written articles accusing Wikipedia of bias in its coverage, including in the Israeli–Palestinian conflict, the killing of Iryna Zarutska, and the assassination of Charlie Kirk. Author Stephen Harrison was critical of his coverage, writing in Slate: "Like much of Rindsberg's work, the point isn't to provide information to readers about what's happening on Wikipedia, but to stoke further outrage for attention." Rindsberg is creator and editor of NeutralPOV, a Substack newsletter dedicated to criticizing Wikipedia.

== Personal life ==
In the mid-2000s, he moved to Tel Aviv, Israel, where he was living as of 2019. As of June 2019, he was married to a Londoner.

== Bibliography ==
- Tel Aviv Stories: Israeli Short Fiction from the Heart of the Mideast. Midnight Oil Publishing. 2011. ISBN 9780615422435.
- Rivkah and Rebecca: A Novella of Life, Love & Loss in Jerusalem. Midnight Oil Publishing. 2020.
- The Gray Lady Winked: How the New York Times's Misreporting, Distortions and Fabrications Radically Alter History. Midnight Oil Publishing. 2021. ISBN 9781736703311.
