= Nextbook =

- Formation: 2003
- Location: United States
- Official language: English
- Website: nextbookpress.com

Nextbook is a nonprofit Jewish organization founded in 2003 by Elaine Bernstein's Keren Keshet Foundation to promote Jewish literacy and support Jewish literature, culture and ideas. The organization sponsors public lectures, commissions books on Jewish topics through Schocken Books, and publishes an online magazine, Tablet.

On June 9, 2009, Nextbook changed the name of its online magazine from Nextbook to Tablet Magazine.

As of 2009, Nextbook is funded primarily by the Jewish Communal Fund of New York, a donor-advised fund to which Keren Keshet contributes $16 million per year, according to the 990 tax filing available in 2009. The New York Jewish Week describes Keren Keshet as a "powerhouse" in Jewish philanthropy that provided essentially all of Tablet's $5 million annual budget. Jonathan Rosen became editorial director in 2007.

As of 2012 the president of the board is Arthur W. Fried, and Morton Landowne is executive director, described by JTA as a "New York businessman and longtime Modern Orthodox lay leader" whose community experience could help in correcting what some critics call Nextbook's inability to establish a broader reach across the Jewish community.
