= Go back to Poland =

Slogan used against Israelis and Jews

Go Back to Poland (Note: Alternative toponyms used in the slogan include: America (James 2010), Brooklyn (Douglas 2024), Germany (Walker 2024), Ukraine, Europe (Starr 2024), or Russia (Marcus 2015).) is an antisemitic slogan directed at Israeli Jews. Instances of the slogan generated renewed criticism and accusations of antisemitism when they were heard at pro-Palestine protests in Europe and North America during the Gaza war.

== Historical context ==
Historian Robin Douglas traces the origin of the sentiment embodied in the slogan "go back to Poland" back to nineteenth-century Protestantism, when Jews were seen as exiles and inauthentically European. With the wave of Jewish immigration to Western Europe at the beginning of the twentieth century, the arriving Jews were again seen as both foreigners and also colonizers of Western Europe. By the 1930s, "go back to Palestine" had become a popular antisemitic insult.

=== Within the Israeli-Palestinian conflict ===
Zionism has been described by several scholars as a form of settler colonialism in relation to the region of Palestine and the Israeli–Palestinian conflict. Zionism's early founders and leaders were aware and unapologetic about their status as colonizers. As the theoretical framework of settler colonialism developed in the 1960s during the decolonization of Africa, it was applied to the Israeli-Palestinian conflict. The theoretical framework re-emerged in Israeli academia in the 1990s led by Israeli and Palestinian scholars, particularly the New Historians, who refuted a number of Israel's foundational myths. This perspective contends that Zionism involves processes of elimination and assimilation of Palestinians, akin to other settler colonial contexts similar to the creation of the United States and Australia. Critics of the characterization of Zionism as settler colonialism argue that it does not fit traditional colonial frameworks, seeing Zionism instead as the repatriation of an indigenous population and an act of self-determination for the Jewish people. This debate reflects broader tensions over competing historical and political narratives regarding the founding of the State of Israel and the Israeli–Palestinian conflict.

== Usage ==
On 4 April 1938, Conservative politician Robert Bower told the Jewish MP Manny Shinwell to "go back to Poland." Shinwell responded by striking Bower on the side of his head before leaving.

In 2000, a Jewish student at UC Irvine was told to "go back to Russia." The same slogan was alleged in a lawsuit to have been used against a 2002 pro-Israel rally at San Francisco State University.

In June 2010, Helen Thomas, former dean of the White House press corps, retired from her Hearst position after remarking that Israeli Jews should "return" to Poland, Germany and America.

=== Gaza war university protests ===
The slogan "go back to Poland" was directed at pro-Israel students at Gaza war protests on university campuses during the Gaza war. In November 2023, the slogan was yelled at Jewish students at Queens College, City University of New York. In Canada, Université de Montréal professor Yanise Arab was suspended after shouting "Go back to Poland, sharmouta! (whore)" during a protest in November 2023. The slogan was also directed towards students at protests at or around Columbia University, at Stanford University, and at University College London. At Columbia, amid allegations of antisemitism at the university in relation to the Gaza Solidarity Encampment in April 2024, social media posts circulated of protesters outside the gates telling pro-Israel students to "go back to Poland." In a statement, Columbia University Apartheid Divest distanced itself from what it described as "media distractions focusing on inflammatory individuals who do not represent us” and affirmed “at universities across the nation, our movement is united in valuing every human life.”

In June 2024, protestors at UCLA told a Chabad Rabbi to "go back to Poland or Ukraine" and "go back to Europe." Canadian Member of Parliament Anthony Housefather reported "Go back to Poland" being chanted at university encampments in 2024, and videos showed the expression being chanted at protests in Toronto.

Protesters at the Harvard quad would yell expressions including as "go back to Russia” and "we know where you live" at passers-by wearing a kippah or a Star of David necklace.

== Analysis ==
In his 2024 book Where Are Jews at Home?, Robin Douglas asserts that the slogan is an antisemitic call that should be viewed within the broader historical context of Jews being "alien in Europe" and being externally assigned their own "moral and political visions." Douglas and lawyer Nathan Lewin both contend that the slogans are a continuation of the calls for Jews to move to Palestine during the Nazi era. Lewin reflects on contemporary antisemitic rhetoric, drawing a historical parallel to his father's experience in 1937 Łódź, where he was told to “Go to Palestine.” Lewin argues that both expressions function as exclusionary attacks rooted in enduring antisemitism, then directed at Jews living in Europe, now at Jews supporting or living in Israel.

A 2024 report from the Jewish Advisory Committee at Stanford University called the slogan "go back to Brooklyn", which was heard during campus protests, "part of the broader antisemitic lexicon." Professor Philipp Lenhard considers the slogan to be a form of "postcolonial antisemitism," which expresses the wish that Jews would "disappear, preferably to the land of Auschwitz and Kielce." A similar view was taken by Professor James R. Russell in a 2024 Times of Israel blog post, where he argued that those chanting "go back to Poland" were specifically referring to the Treblinka and Auschwitz concentration camps.

Author Seth Greenland described the phrase as "grotesque and willfully misinformed." According to trauma therapists Miri Bar-Halpern and Jaclyn Wolfman, the phrase is an instance of "exclu[sion] as a form of traumatic invalidation [...] sending the message that Jews do not belong and are unwanted."

Harvard Law Professor Mark Tushnet comments that the expression, "go back to Russia," which was targeted towards visible Jews on Harvard's campus, "might be protected expression under the First Amendment: not a threat and the mere infliction of dignitary harm. Yet, I find it difficult to believe that the statement can’t count toward establishing a hostile environment."

=== Within the Arab-Israeli conflict ===
In 2016, Rusi Jaspal analyzed the statements and sentiment in the Iranian press that Israeli Jews "should go back to their origins." Jaspal writes that these statements are meant to delegitimize any historical Jewish connection to Israel, in opposition to the Palestinians, who are perceived as native. He says that the description of Israelis as "Ashkenazi Zionist Jews from Europe," despite most Israeli Jews being of Sephardic and Mizrahi origin, is meant to cast Israel as a racist occupation rooted in European colonialist policies.

In her 2022 book, Sina Arnold contends that the left-wing use of the slogan against non-Israeli Jews is part of a trend of Jews being negatively associated with Israel, and being blamed for Israeli policy. She cites a case of a 2015 Black Lives Matter anti-gentrification rally outside a marijuana dispensary in Seattle, where the Jewish owner was told to "go back to Germany" and "let them Nazis get on you again." The owner was identified in a speech given outside as an Israeli who served in the Israel Defense Forces. The owner, however, was an American who had never visited Israel, and whose family had lived in the neighbourhood for multiple generations.

Jo-Ann Mort of The Guardian called the usage of the phrase in the context of Israel ironic, pointing to the fact that the majority of the Jewish population in Israel are the children or grandchildren of those who made aliyah to Israel, namely from Europe and the MENA region. She also pointed to Mizrahi Jews, who lived in the Middle East and North Africa before the establishment of the state, outnumbering Ashkenazi Jews in Israel as well as the presence of Indian Jews and Ethiopian Jews in Israel, most of whom never lived in Europe.

== See also ==
- From the river to the sea
- Go back to where you came from
- Perpetual foreigner
- Rootless cosmopolitan
- Zionism as settler colonialism
