= Liel Leibovitz =

Israeli journalist

- ליאל ליבוביץ
- Born: Tel Aviv, Israel; 1976 (age 49–50)

Liel Leibovitz (Hebrew: ליאל ליבוביץ; born 1976) is an Israeli journalist, author, media critic, and video game scholar. Leibovitz was born in Tel Aviv, immigrated to the United States in 1999, and earned a Ph.D. from Columbia University in 2007. In 2014, he was Visiting Assistant Professor of Media, Culture and Communication at New York University.

== Early life and education ==
Leibovitz was born in Tel Aviv, Israel, to Iris and Rony Leibovitz. His father, born into a wealthy family, became known in Israel as the "Motorcycle Bandit" who robbed 21 banks and served 8 years in prison during his son's childhood. Leibovitz visited his father weekly while he was in prison, and his family suffered financially after his father's incarceration. When he was aged about 9, he became interested in the United States after visiting relatives resident there. He received his B.A. from Tel Aviv University and after moving to New York City, he received an M.S. in journalism and a Ph.D. in communications from Columbia University.

== Career ==
Leibovitz was a non-commissioned officer in the Spokesperson’s Unit of the Israel Defense Forces. He attended the film school at Tel Aviv University before moving to New York. He worked at a hardware store and then at the Israeli Consulate as a senior press officer, producing "Israel Line", a daily summary of significant news taken directly from Israeli media. He served as culture editor of the Jewish Week, and has written for The Nation and The New Republic.

Leibovitz serves as editor-at-large for the online American Jewish publication Tablet magazine in addition to hosting a pair of podcasts. He was a co-host on Tablet's podcast, Unorthodox, until October 2024, when the podcast ended and Leibovitz began to host Tablet's new podcast, Rootless.

Since the August/September 2021 issue of First Things, Leibovitz has written a column entitled Leibovitz at Large, replacing the long-running column Litvak at Large by Shalom Carmy.

== Personal life ==
Leibovitz is married to American author Lisa Ann Sandell, who has published three young adult novels. He lives in New York City.

== Books ==
- How the Talmud Can Change Your Life: Surprisingly Modern Advice from a Very Old Book (Norton, 2023)
- Stan Lee: A Life in Comics (Yale University Press, 2020)
- A Broken Hallelujah: Rock and Roll, Redemption, and the Life of Leonard Cohen (Norton, 2014)
- God in the Machine: Video Games as Spiritual Pursuit, Templeton Press (2014)
- Fortunate Sons: The 120 Chinese Boys Who Came to America, Went to School, and Revolutionized an Ancient Civilization, with Matthew Miller (Norton, 2011)
- Lili Marlene: The Soldiers' Song of World War II (Norton, 2009)
- Thinking Inside the Box: Towards an Ontology of Video Games (Columbia University Dissertation, 2007)
- Aliya: Three Generations of American-Jewish Immigration to Israel (St. Martin's Press, 2006)
