= Pirate Wires =

US-based media company

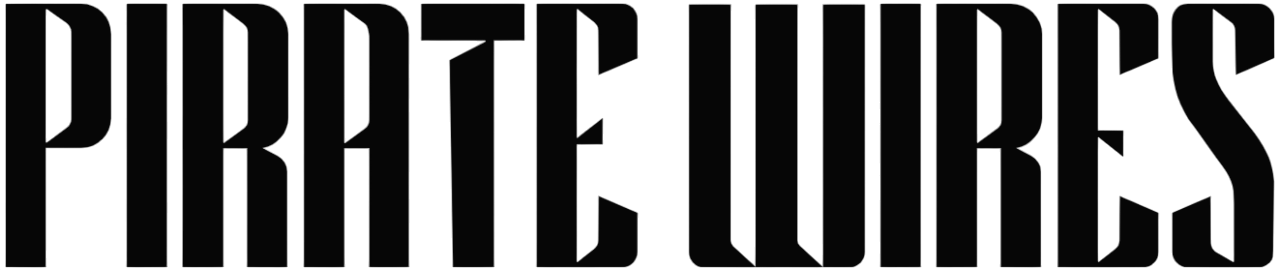
- Type: Online newspaper, media company
- Founder: Mike Solana
- Editor-in-chief: Mike Solana
- Editor: Blake Dodge, Riley Nork, Harris Sockel, G.B. Rango, Ashley Rindsberg
- Founded: 2020
- Language: English
- Country: United States
- Readership: 100,000+ subscribers
- Website: www.piratewires.com

Pirate Wires is an American media company and newsletter focused on reporting politics, tech and culture. It was founded by American conservative political commentator, Founders Fund vice-president and entrepreneur Mike Solana in 2020, during the COVID-19 pandemic.

== History ==
Pirate Wires was founded in 2020 by Mike Solana, conservative political commentator and vice-president of Founders Fund during the COVID-19 pandemic. Pirate Wires was initially a newsletter and a podcast before its website was created. The newsletter was funded by Founders Fund and Peter Thiel, it later hired several editors, expanding into a full media company. Over 100,000 people had subscribed to paid newsletter of Pirate Wires. The publications of Pirate Wires usually report on politics, tech, and culture. They either consist of interviews with high-profile tech figures, op-eds by Mike Solana or his editorial team, tech-related news and political articles about San Francisco that criticize left-wing policies. An article from October 2024 written by Christopher Beam of The Atlantic speculated that Pirate Wires may be overly influenced by Silicon Valley funding, while founder Mike Solana maintained that the company is fully independent.

Pirate Wires traces its roots to Solana's podcast named Problematic that he started in March 2020, he started writing newsletter shortly after the podcast's founding. Solana said that he called the newsletter "Pirate Wires" because it reminded him of various subjects including internet piracy and pirate radio.

Pirate Wires has a Substack newsletter that had thousands of followers and existed before the creation of the website. The subscription to Pirate Wires costs $20 a month, or $120/year. Some reports claim that Pirate Wires is a right-wing news website, whereas other say that the site is more libertarian. Their content has been considered popular among tech-right readers. Reportedly, the reason behind Solana's launch of Pirate Wires in 2020 was his desire to counter "draconian political censorship" and media's negative coverage of tech.

== Reporting ==
The company has published a number of articles about San Francisco's politics which criticize the city's politicians. It has also published stories reporting on George Soros as well as others covering Joe Biden. In June 2024, Pirate Wires reported on Twitter that a new meme coin named "Trump Coin" was created, there was no evidence of the currency's existence, and the post was tagged with a Twitter community note calling it "fake news". The note was removed shortly after but there was still no evidence of the coin's existence leading to confusion and speculations among readers with some wondering if the Pirate Wires' Twitter account had been hacked.

A Pirate Wires report published in December 2024 claimed that employees of Kalshi were secretly paying social media personalities to accuse Shayne Coplan, the CEO of Polymarket, of engaging in illegal activities. The report disclosed that Pirate Wires had a conflict of interest with Polymarket as the company was one of its advertisers.

Since August 2025, Pirate Wires has published eight stories about Wikipedia, which it has termed a "top-down social activism and advocacy machine." In October 2024, Pirate Wires published an article about its investigation into pro-Palestine editors on Wikipedia. The article described a "coordinated campaign" by 40 Wikipedia editors, termed the "Gang of 40", who were working to "delegitimize Israel" and "present radical Islamist groups in a favorable light". Elon Musk reposted the article on social media with the caption: "Wikipedia is controlled by far-Left activists".

In 2024, Slate reported that Pirate Wires had alleged that a "terrorist network" of pro-Palestine users on Reddit were manipulating various subreddits, such as r/PublicFreakout, to promote their ideology. Reddit launched an investigation in response to the allegations. A few weeks later, Reddit advised that it had found no evidence of manipulation on the scale claimed by Pirate Wires.

== Reception ==
In 2024, Christopher Beam writing for The Atlantic called the publication a "must-read among Silicon Valley's anti-woke crowd". Pirate Wires was described by Trae Stephens, one of Founders Fund's associates, as "techno-optimistic" publication that reads like "being inside Solana's brain". UnHerd called Pirate Wires a "MAGA-adjacent website". Jeffrey Goldberg, editor-in-chief of The Atlantic, said that Pirate Wires gives people a "really good insight into MAGA thinking in the Silicon Valley, people who are supporting Donald Trump".

Politico Magazine said Pirate Wires is a "libertarian-leaning" news outlet. Business Insider and The Guardian have both been critical, with The Guardian calling it a "conservative newsletter". Writer Radley Balko called Pirate Wires a "rich-people-backed platform" that has become popular among the "heterodox right". He also criticized Pirate Wires' article about him by Harris Sockel, saying Sockel has a "beef" with him.
