= Nikola Bizumić =

Serbian inventor (1823–1906)

Nikola Bizumić (1823–1906) was a Serbian inventor and entrepreneur known for having invented the hand-held hair clipper.

== Biography ==
Nikola Bizumić was born in 1823 into a humble family in Neradin, at the time part of the Kingdom of Slavonia in the Austrian Empire. Following his education in his hometown, Bizumić sought further training in the barber trade in Irig. To enhance the efficiency and speed of haircuts, he came up with the idea of a machine, but his employer failed to comprehend the potential of his invention, prompting Bizumić to quit his job and relocate to Ruma.

In 1855, Bizumić left for London and managed to secure financial backing from investors who recognised the value of his invention. Production started and his invention quickly gained recognition, ultimately being exported throughout Europe.

By 1865, barbershops across the continent had widely adopted Bizumić's device, transforming the haircutting experience. With the subsequent introduction of electric clippers, the use of manual hand clippers gradually declined. Bizumić changed his name to a more "English" sounding name. It is a popular belief that he became known in the United Kingdom under the name John Smith. Bizumić died in 1906 with an estate valued at 22 million pounds.

== See also ==
- Wahl Clipper
- Flowbee
- Regular haircut
