= Moon and Stars =

Moon and Stars may refer to:

== Arts and entertainment ==
=== Albums ===
- The Moon and the Stars, a 2011 album by Buren Bayaer
- The Moon and Stars: Prescriptions for Dreamers, a 2021 album by Valerie June
- Moon & Stars, a 2024 album by The Mavericks

=== Songs ===
- "Moon and Stars (Reverie)", a piano composition by Carl Wilhelm Kern
- "Moon and the Stars", from the 1986 Earl Klugh album Life Stories
- "Luna Y Estrellas (Moon & Stars)", from the 1996 Lara & Reyes album Two Guitars One Passion
- "Moon and Stars", from the 2010 mixtape K.R.I.T. Wuz Here
- "The Moon and the Stars", from the 2014 John Mark Nelson album Sings the Moon
- "Moon and Stars", a 2020 single by Snot

=== Film and television ===
- "Moon and Stars", a 1990 episode of Rod, Jane and Freddy
- "Moon and Stars", a 2006 episode of The Good Night Show
- The Moon and the Stars, a 2007 film

=== Other arts and entertainment ===
- "The Moon and the Stars", a 1902 poster by Alphonse Mucha
- "Moon and Stars", a 2015 episode of the Judge John Hodgman podcast
- Moon and Stars, an annual music festival in Locarno, Switzerland

== Other ==
- The Moon and Stars Project grant program of the American Turkish Society
- Moon and Stars, a variety of watermelon
- The Moon and Stars, an early 20th-century temperance hotel operated by John Boudier of the Cardiff Coloured Men's Christian Association
- The Moon and Stars, an early 20th-century pub operated by St Anne's Church, Roath, Cardiff

== See also ==
- Crescent and star (symbol), which sometimes includes multiple stars
- The Sun The Moon The Stars, an American band
