= Judge John Hodgman =

American comedic court show podcast

- Genre: Court show/Comedy
- Language: English

Cast and voices
- Hosted by: John Hodgman, Jesse Thorn

Production
- Length: 30–60 min.

Publication
- No. of episodes: 759 (as of 2026)
- Original release: November 1, 2010
- Provider: Maximum Fun
- Updates: Weekly (Wednesdays)

Related
- Website: www.maximumfun.org/shows/judge-john-hodgman

Judge John Hodgman is a weekly, comedic court show podcast hosted by John Hodgman and Jesse Thorn. The show is distributed online by Maximum Fun.

The program features host John Hodgman acting as a judge (with Jesse Thorn as bailiff) adjudicating real-life disputes within a fictional courtroom setting. The cases answer low-stakes questions like, "Should the kitchen sink's built-in dispenser be filled with dish soap or hand soap?" and "Can you stop family members from using your childhood nickname?"

== History ==
"Tonally, there was no discussion; I just don't know any other way to do it. I don't want to make people feel bad, and I don't want to make their problems into a joke. I do love telling people when they're right and wrong, but for the most part, it was always going to be about real fights where people have a real difference of opinion and a real dispute. I want to make jokes, but I also want to make a decision that is fair."

— John Hodgman

Judge John Hodgman was originally a segment of the Maximum Fun podcast Jordan, Jesse Go! When Hodgman ended his podcast Today In The Past, he began Judge John Hodgman as a full-fledged podcast. The podcast launched in November 2010, and released its 500th episode in January 2021.

== Format ==
In each episode, "Judge" John Hodgman hears and renders a judgment on a dispute (often over petty or trivial matters) between two people (calling in via Skype or similar program from their home location) in a virtual "courtroom" setting. Hodgman's co-host most episodes is "bailiff" Jesse Thorn, who introduces each episode, interjects humorous questions and observations during cases, and interviews the disputants before and after Hodgman's verdict is announced. Several episodes have also included notable "expert witnesses" who call in and offer their insight into the case. Though Hodgman has no formal legal training or experience (often describing himself as dispensing "fake internet justice"), and much of the content is played for laughs and entertainment, the disputants in each episode do verbally agree to abide by Hodgman's ruling before their case is heard.

The NPR show All Things Considered reported, "The show is a vehicle for comedy, but Hodgman and Thorn both say the podcast has an earnest side, too. Jokes aside, they say, Hodgman really does take the job of fake internet judge seriously. 'The best Judge John Hodgman cases,' Thorn says, 'are always about the relationship between the litigants.'"

There are also separate episodes in which Hodgman and Thorn "clear the docket", discussing and ruling on cases which were not selected for a full hearing.

== Guests ==
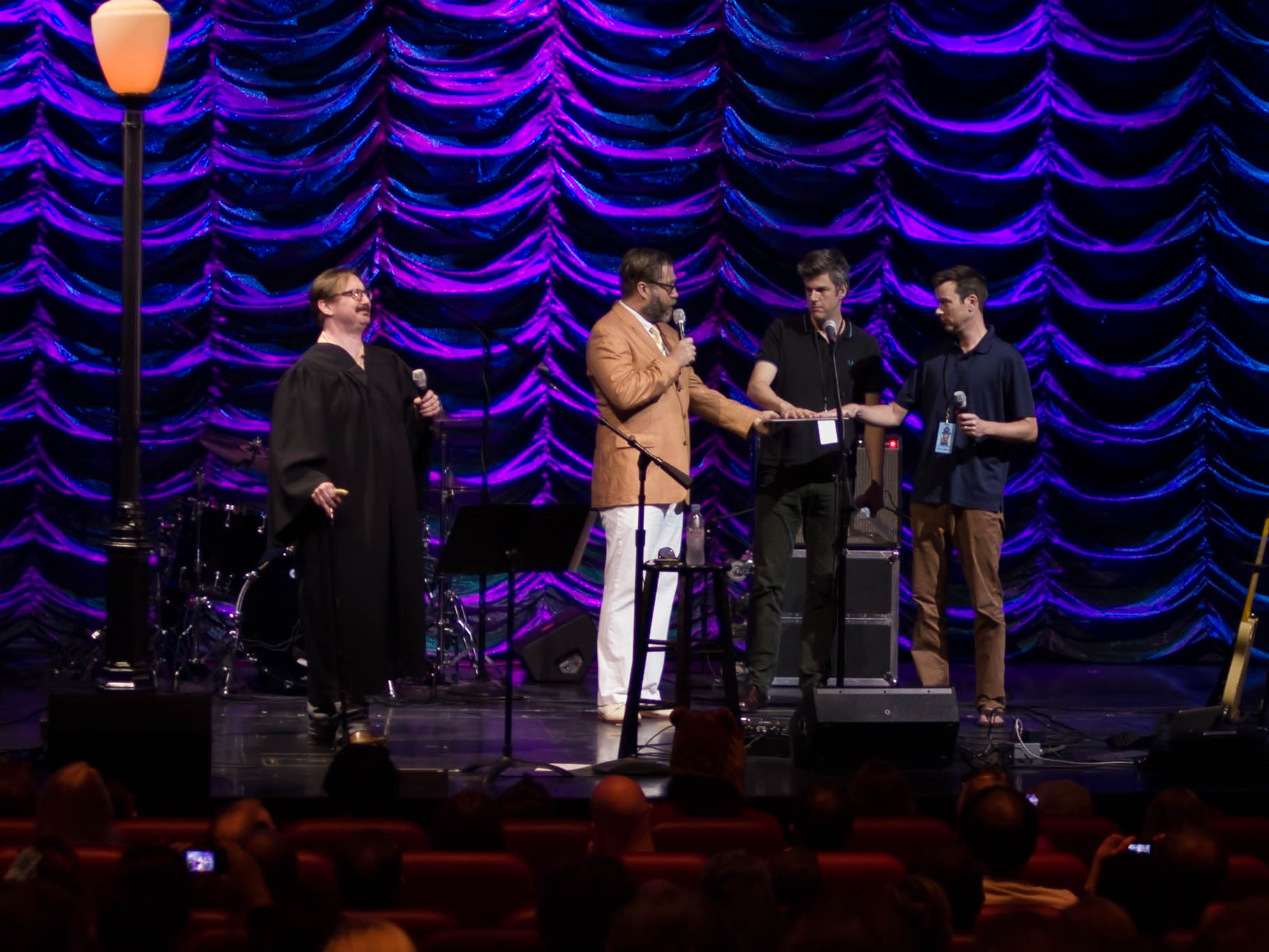
Live taping of Judge John Hodgman with guest bailiff John Roderick

When Jesse Thorn is not available, his role has been filled by "Guest Bailiffs", including Scott Adsit, Elna Baker, Monte Belmonte, Elizabeth Gilbert, Jean Grae, Jordan Morris, Tom Scharpling, and Jake Tapper. "Expert witnesses" calling in to offer their insights into cases have included Kurt Braunohler, Alton Brown, Brother Ali, Jonathan Coulton, Dante, John Darnielle, Jane Espenson, Jonathan Goldstein, Jonathan Miles, Eugene Mirman, David Rees, Mary Roach, John Roderick, Paul F. Tompkins, Morgan Webb, and Jon Wurster.

When Judge John Hodgman has been taken on the road and performed in front of a live audience, one or more musical guests have been invited to perform after or in between cases. These performers include John Darnielle, Jonathan Coulton, Jean Grae, Mr. Len, John Vanderslice, and MeLa Machinko.

On occasions that Hodgman was not available to record an episode, Jesse Thorn has acted as judge, with Jordan Morris of Jordan, Jesse, Go! filling in as bailiff.

== Episodes ==
In January 2021, the podcast released its 500th episode.

Year	Episodes	Originally Released		
Year	Episodes	First Released	Last released	Distributor
2010	8	November 1, 2010	December 20, 2010	Maximum Fun
2011	38	January 3, 2011	December 22, 2011	Maximum Fun
2012	44	January 4, 2012	December 26, 2012	Maximum Fun
2013	50	January 2, 2013	December 24, 2013	Maximum Fun
2014	51	January 1, 2014	December 31, 2014	Maximum Fun
2015	51	January 7, 2015	December 30, 2015	Maximum Fun
2016	51	January 7, 2016	December 28, 2016	Maximum Fun
2017	51	January 4, 2017	December 27, 2017	Maximum Fun
2018	51	January 3, 2018	December 20, 2018	Maximum Fun
2019	51	January 2, 2019	December 18, 2019	Maximum Fun
2020	52	January 2, 2020	December 30, 2020	Maximum Fun
Special	4	January 13, 2011	November 3, 2017	Maximum Fun

=== Special episodes ===
==== Judge John Hodgman: Maritime Edition ====
In January 2011, two cases involving participants on the Jonathan Coulton Cruise Crazy were adjudicated by Judge John Hodgman and posted on YouTube.

No.	Episode Title	Guest Bailiff	Dispute	Release Date
1	"Crazy Gravy"	None	The merits of brown gravy versus white gravy	January 13, 2011
2	"Christmas Music Ruling"	David Rees	When should seasonal or Christmas music be played?	January 13, 2011

==== Bonus episodes ====
No.	Episode Title	Guest Bailiff	Dispute	ReDate
1	"Livin' that CALI415 Life"		Docket episode centered around car-related questions, featuring comedian River Butcher	April 29, 2016
2	"Jesse Thorn Interviews John Hodgman"		Rebroadcast from Thorn's program "Bullseye".	November 3, 2017

== Newspaper column ==
Since October 2015, Judge John Hodgman has appeared as a newspaper column in The New York Times Magazine every Sunday, in which Hodgman settles disputes in a similar fashion. Topics range from appropriate household toilet paper quotas to the proper way to wear a wedding band.

== Live show ==
Judge John Hodgman has held live recordings on numerous occasions in Canada, the US and UK. In the U.S. the show has been held in venues ranging from 1000-1400 seats, including Boston's Wilbur Theatre, San Francisco's Castro Theatre, Seattle's Neptune Theatre and Brooklyn's Murmrr Theatre. In September 2017 two shows were held live at the London Podcast Festival at Kings Place, London, England.

== Reception ==
Judge John Hodgman has received critical praise in the media, from outlets including Rolling Stone, NPR's All Things Considered, HuffPost, Vox, Splendry, BoingBoing and Boston Magazine.

In November 2010, Boing Boing's Mark Frauenfelder wrote "Only three episodes of the Judge John Hodgman podcast have been produced, but I know that it's going to be one of my favorites." Boston's Thomas Lewis called Judge John Hodgman a "hilarious podcast". A 2017 review on Splendry wrote, "Yes, these are silly disputes. And while there is much laughter, there is also much wisdom. I have found myself laughing uproariously and nodding thoughtfully in the same episode."

In 2013, Arizona muralist Joe Pagac created art for Judge John Hodgman entitled "Sexy Justice". "Sexy Justice" has since been made available via online retailer TopatoCo as prints.

In 2014, Rolling Stone ranked Judge John Hodgman #15 in their list "The 20 Best Comedy Podcasts Right Now".

Judge John Hodgman won the 2020 Webby Award for Comedy in the category Podcasts.
