= List of Judge John Hodgman episodes (2010–2014) =

This is a list of Judge John Hodgman episodes produced and distributed between 2010 and 2014 by Maximum Fun and hosted by humorist John Hodgman. Except where noted, every episode also features radio personality Jesse Thorn as co-host and "bailiff".

Since April 2012, titles of episodes are taken from suggestions posted on the show's official Facebook page by fans of the podcast.

Beginning in 2014, some episodes are dedicated to Hodgman and Thorn discussing and ruling on cases which were not selected for a full hearing. Each such episode in which they "clear the docket" is listed as a "docket episode" (in italics) in the episode description.

== Episodes ==
=== Overview ===
Year	Episodes	Originally Released		
Year	Episodes	First Released	Last released	Distributor
2010	8	November 1, 2010	December 20, 2010	Maximum Fun
2011	38	January 3, 2011	December 22, 2011	Maximum Fun
2012	44	January 4, 2012	December 26, 2012	Maximum Fun
2013	50	January 2, 2013	December 24, 2013	Maximum Fun
2014	51	January 1, 2014	December 31, 2014	Maximum Fun
2015	51	January 7, 2015	December 30, 2015	Maximum Fun
2016	51	January 7, 2016	December 28, 2016	Maximum Fun
2017	51	January 4, 2017	December 27, 2017	Maximum Fun
2018	51	January 3, 2018	December 20, 2018	Maximum Fun
2019	51	January 2, 2019	December 18, 2019	Maximum Fun
2020	52	January 2, 2020	December 30, 2020	Maximum Fun
Special	4	January 13, 2011	November 3, 2017	Maximum Fun

=== 2010 ===
No.	Title	Original release date
1	TBA	November 1, 2010
A transitional episode, rebroadcasting a "Judge John Hodgman" segment from Jordan, Jessie, Go!
2	"Dish Soap or Hand Soap?"	November 8, 2010
Should hand soap or dish soap be used in the disputants' home?
3	"Are Machine Guns Robots?"	November 15, 2010
Do the qualities of the machine gun make it a robot?
4	"Tear Down That Wall"	November 23, 2010
Does "breaking the fourth wall" ruin a work of fiction or enhance it?
5	"The Long-Necked Custody Battle"	November 29, 2010
A custody case centered around a toy mechanical giraffe.
6	"The Lovely Couple"	December 8, 2010
Is physical attractiveness essential to romance?
7	"The Lion's Den"	December 14, 2010
Is the extra room in Greg and Shannon's house a den?
8	"Tree or Not to Tree"	December 20, 2010
Should Christmas decorations go up before or on Christmas Eve?

=== 2011 ===
No.	Title	Original release date
9	"The Parenthetical Petition"	January 3, 2011
Is it appropriate to use parentheses in fiction writing? Episode recorded live at The Talent Show in Brooklyn, NY.
10	"The Cone-Tractual Dispute"	January 21, 2011
A dispute centered around the manufacture of a food truck awning.
11	"The Case of the Youthful Indiscretions"	January 31, 2011
Should Michael apologize for stealing things from his brother Evan as a toddler?
12	"You Say Martucci, I Say Martucci"	February 9, 2011
How should the members of the Martucci family pronounce their last name?
13	"The Tahitian Takeout"	February 16, 2011
Dining at a Tahitian restaurant, Evan spotted some apparently abandoned take-out food and claimed it for himself. His friend Ryan believes the incident was both stealing and unhygienic.
14	"Snob V. Slob"	February 24, 2011
Lisa believes her fiancée John should dress more professionally to make a better impression at his IT job.
15	"Sesame Street Justice"	March 2, 2011
As a prank, a group of students kidnapped a life-sized Ernie statue from their youth group leader; while in their custody, the statue was stolen, and hasn't yet turned up again. Are the students ultimately responsible for the disappearance?
16	"The Potluck Problem"	March 8, 2011
A debate about the morality of potluck dinners.
17	"Parents Just Don't Understand"	March 16, 2011
Michael is trying to compel his daughter Avigayil into watching classic movies with him. Must Avigayil give in to him?
18	"The Colbert Rapport"	March 31, 2011
Andrew and his girlfriend Brit disagree on whether she should have assisted in his efforts at a party to get a photo taken with Stephen Colbert.
19	"The Ironman Trial-Athlon"	April 6, 2011
May Tom participate in an Ironman Triathlon over the wishes of his wife?
20	"An Appeel-ate Decision Case"	April 14, 2011
What is the correct way to peel a banana?
21	"You Say Tomato, I Say Justice"	April 21, 2011
Is Josh using regionalisms or simply mispronouncing words?
22	"Tips and Tricks and Justice"	April 29, 2011
John and Joseph debate whether the use of strategy guides for video games constitutes cheating. Expert witness Morgan Webb.
23	"Arby's-tration"	May 4, 2011
When taking a taxi, is it appropriate to ask the driver to go through a fast food restaurant's drive-through?
24	"The Bedroom Three-way"	May 11, 2011
Which one of three roommates deserves their apartment's best room?
25	"The Girlfriend and the Grasshopper"	May 18, 2011
Jeff accuses his girlfriend of habitually hiding food from him.
26	"The Toot Dispute"	May 25, 2011
Must Jason excuse himself whenever he passes gas?
27	"The Friendship Inquest"	June 2, 2011
Will argues that the time has come for his friend Adam to join social networking sites, despite Adam's objections.
28	"The Battle of the Baton"	June 9, 2011
Erica is offended by her husband's habit of pretending to conduct the orchestra whenever he listens to classical music.
29	"Justice is Out There"	June 16, 2011
Having been given a pair of The X-Files action figures for Christmas, Randi and Chris disagree on whether to keep them in their packaging or use them as intended.
30	"Ob-Law-Di, Ob-Law-Da"	June 23, 2011
A debate over the merits of The Beatles' "White Album".
31	"Garbage Man and Wife"	July 6, 2011
Kay argues that, hygienically, the person who takes out the trash should also replace the bag in the can. Her husband Matt disagrees.
32	"The Cow Beef"	July 20, 2011
Ted believes his father has gone too far on his obsession with cows.
33	"Hors d'oeuvres in the Court"	August 19, 2011
Should Mike keep his promise to his three children on rewarding them with money if they tried bacon-wrapped scallops?
34	"De Plane"	August 31, 2011
Elisabeth and Melissa disagree on the best method of leaving their seats after plane flights.
35	"Unbanded Brothers"	September 22, 2011
Jeff and Jack are brothers and bandmates. Is Jack acting unprofessional in requesting time off from their tour to attend a wedding?
36	"Beard Science"	September 28, 2011
Two college friends debate the terms of their beard-growing contest.
37	"Panta-lunacy"	October 12, 2011
Seth and Stephen both lay claim to a pair of pants that had been sitting in a lost-and-found box for four months.
38	"Pepperoni Pauper"	October 19, 2011
Is Flynn going too far in his quest to accumulate as many prize tickets for his favorite pizza chain as possible?
39	"Slash-Friction"	October 26, 2011
What specific characteristics define the horror movie?
40	"The Abuse of Flower Power"	November 2, 2011
May Julienne add a Mexican Daisy to her garden, over the objections of her girlfriend Emily?
41	"Out of REC-order"	November 9, 2011
Anthony has recorded TV shows on his DVR at his friend Joseph's request, but now accuses Joseph of not watching the recordings in a timely manner.
42	"Driving Miss Drowsy"	November 23, 2011
Is there such a thing as "car lag"?
43	"Triple Word Scorn"	December 1, 2011
Jessica argues she earned points in an online word game fair and square when she played a series of letters that "looked like a word" and turned out to be one.
44	"The Bedding Crasher"	December 8, 2011
Chris and Emily believe that their friend Pat should not ask to stay at their apartment when he can afford a hotel.
45	"Apocalypse Row"	December 14, 2011
In the event of the "zombie apocalypse", does it make strategic and tactical sense to take over the nearby Walmart?
46	"The Clap Trap"	December 22, 2011
Bandmates Greg and Eric debate whether they should encourage their audiences to clap along during their concerts.

=== 2012 ===
No.	Title	Original release date
47	"The Carry On Carryings-On"	January 4, 2012
Lisa argues that it is inappropriate for her sister Blair to store her luggage in a plane's carry-on bin if the 5 foot, 1 inch (155 cm) Blair cannot retrieve her bags herself.
48	"The Wonderful, Terrible, Terrible Towel Trouble"	January 12, 2012
Bobbie and Katie debate whether it is appropriate to use a "Terrible Towel" in the manner of a regular towel.
49	"The Master's Disaster"	January 25, 2012
In pursuit of a master's degree, Jason would like to take the upcoming semester's classes in one 16-week chunk. His wife Jordan believes this plan is too intense and would like for him to take an option that allows him to spread the workload out more.
50	"Double Dog Dare"	February 8, 2012
Marybeth and Paul disagree on whether getting a third dog would be good for their household.
51	"The Wedding Clashers"	February 22, 2012
Lindsay and John have been invited to two weddings occurring on the same day. Should they each separately attend one wedding, or must they attend one of the two together?
52	"The Stick Shift Rift"	March 21, 2012
Cosmo argues that his wife should learn to drive cars with manual transmission.
53	"Cannery Row"	March 28, 2012
Should Ara and her mother Julia follow USDA safety protocols in their canning methods, or follow the less-rigorous, but traditional, family methods? Expert witness Alton Brown.
54	"Die Flederhaus"	April 4, 2012
Brothers Adam and Noah disagree on the most ethical method of dealing with their house's bat infestation problem.
55	"Battle Royale"	April 11, 2012
An American couple living in Toronto debate whether they should apply for Canadian citizenship.
56	"Early Man"	April 18, 2012
Carmen believes her husband Troy's efforts to be punctual leaves them arriving extra early too often.
57	"A Wing and A Player"	April 25, 2012
Michael and Patrick debate whether Patrick is a good wingman for Michael.
58	"Rashomom"	May 2, 2012
Did a grey house near Gloria's childhood home actually exist in real life, or only in Gloria's mind?
59	"Spare the Hodg, Spoil the Child"	May 16, 2012
Aimee believes her sister Gail coddles Aimee's son too much.
60	"Chevy Case"	May 23, 2012
Hannah recently bought a Chevrolet Camaro from her boyfriend Patrick. Is Patrick entitled to demand she care for its appearance?
61	"Sibling Drivalry"	May 31, 2012
Though siblings Louis and Alejandra share a car, Louis accuses his sister of giving rides from school to her boyfriend instead of himself.
62	"My Dinner with Ennui"	June 6, 2012
Two writers debate whether eating at the same restaurants on a regular basis helps or hinders their creativity.
63	"Nature vs. Nerd-ture"	June 14, 2012
A pair of married academics debate whether they should encourage their potential children's "nerdy" interests by sending them to specialized summer camps.
64	"A Quashed Plot Never Spoils"	June 20, 2012
What constitutes a spoiler, and how long should someone go out of their way to avoid revealing them?
65	"Crumb-er vs. Crammer"	June 27, 2012
Do Scott's cleaning habits need to be improved, or are his wife's standards too high?
66	"Antisocial Networking"	July 4, 2012
Mike defends his habit of texting and emailing in the middle of conversations with his friend Lauren.
67	"Call in the Family"	July 18, 2012
Katy complains that her brother Steve never leaves a voice-mail asking her to call him back when she misses his calls, claiming that a "missed call" notification should suffice.
68	"The Cluck Stops Here"	July 25, 2012
Should married couple Lauren and Jon raise chickens in their new backyard?
69	"Night Food Court"	August 1, 2012
May Matt continue his practice of making late-night fast food runs with his best friend, over the objections of Matt's wife?
70	"The Golden State Debate"	August 8, 2012
Should Dan join his friend Harry in Los Angeles, or stay in New York City?
71	"Probable Cos-Play"	August 15, 2012
Donald, Jessie, and their son are going to a Star Wars convention for their vacation. Must Jessie dress up in a themed costume to match her husband and son, even though she is not a fan of Star Wars herself?
72	"The Nominative Case"	August 22, 2012
Two friends had agreed on a Mr. Mxyzptlk-themed bet but differ on the details.
73	"Gavelbangers Ball"	August 30, 2012
Will attempts to compel his girlfriend Caroline into listening to examples of his favorite musical genre: heavy metal. Expert Witness John Darnielle.
74	"The Split Screen Decision"	September 6, 2012
A lover of lowbrow movies complains that his filmmaker girlfriend recommends too many "arty" movies to him. Special guest John Darnielle.
75	"Cigarettiquette"	September 12, 2012
Should Bradley show more discretion in his public use of electronic cigarettes?
76	"Snooze Control"	September 19, 2012
An early riser and his late-rising wife cannot agree on a morning routine that works best for both of them.
77	"Passing the Bar"	September 26, 2012
Must Abby be compelled to attend after-work happy hours with her colleagues?
78	"The Mother Tongue"	October 3, 2012
Matthew would like to brush up on his Vietnamese skills alongside his children as they learn the language. His wife Y believes he should practice on his own.
79	"Irre-console-able Differences"	October 10, 2012
Jessica gave her video game system to her sister Eden before leaving for the Peace Corps, but the system broke while under Eden's care. Is Jessica entitled to restitution?
80	"The Obligatory Name Drop"	October 17, 2012
Evelyn dislikes a nickname she has had since childhood and wants to compel her family to cease using it.
81	"Live Freon or Die"	October 24, 2012
Must Mike properly fix or replace the air conditioning in his car?
82	"Sort Reform and The Right Not to Bare Arms"	November 1, 2012
"Sort Reform": Whose laundry sorting methods should be followed: David's or Natily's? "The Right Not to Bare Arms": Should Peter adhere to the promise Barbara made to their daughter that both parents would get flu shots if she would, even though he wasn't present at the time? Episode recorded live at WNYC's Jerome L. Greene Performance Space and features a musical performance by Jonathan Coulton.
83	"A Portrait of the Artist as a Young Slob and B.F.F.-R.I.P."	November 7, 2012
"A Portrait of the Artist as a Young Slob": How should a writer dress during writing sessions? "B.F.F.-R.I.P.": Chad and Angela disagree about whether either of them could get away with murdering the other. Episode recorded live at WNYC's Jerome L. Greene Performance Space and features a musical performance by Jean Grae, MeLa Machinko and Mr. Len.
84	"Dog Duty"	November 14, 2012
Is Zoe entitled to have a long-distance say in how her mother cares for Zoe's dog?
85	"Ipso Lacto"	November 21, 2012
Is Justin correct in his assertion that he doesn't enjoy dairy products?
86	"The Statute of Physical Limitations"	November 28, 2012
Having recovered from a chronic illness, Shumanay argues that she is well enough to take up long-distance running, despite the objections of her husband.
87	"Thanks, But No Pranks"	December 7, 2012
A prank war gets out of hand and the participants disagree about who took it too far.
88	"Probable Claus"	December 13, 2012
Andrew and his wife Alex debate whether they should encourage their child to believe in Santa Claus.
89	"Away With the Manger"	December 19, 2012
Marisa and Jay do not agree on whether they should install a nativity scene.
90	"The Chastity Bet"	December 26, 2012
Having made a bet as teenagers as to who could remain chaste the longest, Jason now accuses his friend Kenan of bending the rules.

=== 2013 ===
No.	Title	Original release date
91	"Coming Out of the Supply Closet"	January 2, 2013
Should officemates Ben and Sara announce to their co-workers that they are dating, or keep it a secret?
92	"Grow v. Blade"	January 9, 2013
A disagreement between parents over whether they should trim the long hair of their son.
93	"Rhapsody in Blue"	January 16, 2013
Elizabeth objects to her songwriter husband's use of profanity in his songs, and would like to challenge him to avoid using it. Expert witness John Roderick.
94	"Bleached and Mounted Bones of Contention"	January 23, 2013
May Nick continue to collect taxidermied animals and other macabre objects, even though his wife Sara is horrified and disgusted by the idea? Expert witnesses John Roderick and Jay Villemarette of Skulls Unlimited International.
95	"Polly Wanna Justice?"	January 30, 2013
Married couple Chris and Kim argue about whether they should continue keeping a noisy and disagreeable parrot.
96	"Bench Warrant"	February 6, 2013
When they go out to eat, should Dimitri and Landon sit across from each other, or on the same side of the table?
97	"Possessions in Nine-Tenths of a Car"	February 13, 2013
Has Joe gone too extreme in his "minimalist" lifestyle?
98	"All Dogs Go To Trial - Live at SF Sketchfest!"	February 20, 2013
Zach is annoyed by his dog trainer girlfriend's insistence on bringing her dog with her everywhere she goes. Episode recorded live at the Marines' Memorial Theatre in San Francisco as a part of SF Sketchfest and features a musical performance by John Darnielle.
99	"Judge and Jewry"	February 27, 2013
Is Beca accurate in her claim that she and her sister are "part Jewish"? Expert witness "Rabbi Mike" from the episode "Parents Just Don't Understand".
100	"The Book Case"	March 6, 2013
Is Jason a book hoarder?
101	"Courtlandia"	March 13, 2013
Lyndy accuses her boyfriend Drew of being a hipster.
102	"Justice Abhors a Vacuum"	March 20, 2013
After accidentally ruining his friend's vacuum cleaner, Matt argues that he shouldn't be obligated to fully pay for a more expensive replacement. Expert Witness Jonathan Coulton.
103	"Gas, Grass, or Justice"	March 27, 2013
Is Chris procrastinating in his pledge to get a driver's license? Expert Witness Paul F. Tompkins.
104	"The Birthday Suit"	April 3, 2013
Should Sean reveal the surprise destination of the birthday trip he's planning for his partner Aldo now?
105	"To the Victor Goes the Spoiled"	April 10, 2013
Hugo believes his wife Natalie throws out moldy but "perfectly usable" food too early. Expert Witness Alton Brown.
106	"Trivial Peer Suit"	April 17, 2013
Does Steve and Claire's trivia team need an official leader?
107	"Dischord is Now in Session"	April 24, 2013
When singing along to a song in the car, is it okay to ignore proper notes or keys? Expert witnesses Jonathan Coulton and David Rees.
108	"A Room With a Feud"	May 1, 2013
Should Mike and Amanda re-arrange the furniture in their apartment, or keep the status quo?
109	"Seating Arraignment"	May 8, 2013
In-laws Chris and Jenna debate whether the time has come to integrate the "kids table" at holiday gatherings.
110	"Veranda Rights"	May 15, 2013
Is it appropriate to decorate a porch area with "indoor" furniture?
111	"A Danderous Precedent"	May 22, 2013
Must Mike submit to allergy shots so that his wife may one day own a furry pet?
112	"Court-o-Potty"	May 29, 2013
When the bathroom in her apartment is occupied, Meg seeks permission to use a chamber pot as a last resort.
113	"Uniform Code of Podcast Justice"	June 5, 2013
May Paul wear the paraphernalia of his favorite baseball team while attending games not featuring it?
114	"Fitness for the Prosecution"	June 12, 2013
Melissa tries to convince her boyfriend Henry into teaming up for a charity mud race.
115	"Permanent Record"	June 19, 2013
May Emily place her next tattoo on her wrist, against the advice of her boyfriend? Expert witness Josh Clark of Stuff You Should Know.
116	"Shut Your Pie-Troll 2"	June 26, 2013
Erin has suggestions that she believes would improve her friend Ezra's "bad movie night" get-togethers.
117	"Lawn and Order"	July 3, 2013
Jumi and Josh debate whether they need a riding lawn mower.
118	"Taxi Evasion"	July 10, 2013
Sam believes that after a night out, it is perfectly safe to walk home. Her boyfriend Marcelo disagrees and argues that she should take a taxi instead.
119	"Odor In The Court"	July 17, 2013
Does Christopher need to do a better job of washing and taking care of his clothes? Jesse Thorn fills in as judge.
120	"Halal In The Family"	July 24, 2013
Should Dan follow his girlfriend Stephanie's religious diet when he is out of the house, even though he is not religious himself? Expert witness Brother Ali. Jesse Thorn fills in as judge.
121	"So Help You Pod, or Whatever"	August 10, 2013
Aaron and Kara disagree on whether Aaron's ball chair should be used in their house or left in storage.
122	"Reckless Endungeonment"	August 14, 2013
Ryan accuses his friend Dan of playing role-playing games too aggressively, ruining the fun for everyone else.
123	"Emergency Podcast System"	August 21, 2013
Does Justin need to take his town's tornado warnings more seriously?
124	"Coast Mortem"	August 29, 2013
Should Dan and Jen move to Los Angeles or Massachusetts?
125	"Weight, Weight, Don't Judge Me"	September 9, 2013
What is the best method of determining the winner of Chad and Elizabeth's weight-loss competition?
126	"There's No Crime Like the Present"	September 11, 2013
Otto argues that the remoteness of his job should preclude him from giving gifts for birthdays and Christmas.
127	"12 Angry Birds"	September 19, 2013
Is Anna addicted to video games?
128	"Horseless Miscarriage of Justice"	September 25, 2013
Must Sonja follow her brother Abraham's advice and buy a car with manual transmission?
129	"Lingua Fracas"	October 3, 2013
Should words that enter the English language from other languages retain their original pronunciations?
130	"Strictly Courtroom"	October 9, 2013
Ricardo and Paola debate whether to practice salsa dancing at home or out at clubs.
131	"May it Breeze the Court"	October 16, 2013
Adrienne likes to use a box fan as a sleep aid, but her husband is concerned about the noise.
132	"Criminal In Tent"	October 25, 2013
Walter and April plan to buy a remote piece of land and live there. Should they build a small, wooden house to live in, or a yurt?
133	"Exit Partay"	October 30, 2013
A social butterfly and her introvert husband disagree on who should decide when they leave parties.
134	"The Right to Remain Silent"	November 14, 2013
Chris attempts to cajole his teenaged daughter into showing more confidence in social situations. Expert witness Eugene Mirman.
135	"Resisting a Rest"	November 21, 2013
The girlfriend of an oft-injured disc ultimate enthusiast tries to convince him to sit out for a few months following recovery from his latest injury.
136	"Case Your State"	November 27, 2013
Two friends born and raised in Massachusetts bicker over whether one of them can truly claim to "be from" the state.
137	"Six Feet Plunder"	December 4, 2013
Reg believes his friend Brittany's project of taking un-tended miniature Christmas trees from grave sites and planting them elsewhere is wrong and tantamount to theft.
138	"Badgering the Waitress"	December 11, 2013
When needing something while dining at a restaurant, Max will call for the attention of the nearest waitstaff. Is such behavior justified or rude?
139	"The Judge John Hodgman Holiday Special"	December 18, 2013
In the spirit of A Christmas Carol, Judge Hodgman is visited by past litigants of the podcast.
140	"Kitchen Loco Parentis"	December 24, 2013
Pablo and Maria cannot agree on how much responsibility to delegate to their two-year-old daughter in the kitchen.

=== 2014 ===
No.	Title	Original release date
141	"Martial Law"	January 1, 2014
Rodrigo would like his friend Matthew to take more challenging jujutsu classes.
142	"The Department of Corrections"	January 8, 2014
Tom is annoyed by his wife's insistence on correcting his grammar usage. Expert witness Emily Brewster of Merriam-Webster.
143	"Namer vs. Namer"	January 15, 2014
Josh and Jackie kept their last names when they married. Whose name should any children they might have take? Special guest Kurt Braunohler.
144	"Father Gnaws Beast"	January 22, 2014
A meat-loving father and his vegetarian daughter cannot agree on how much food should be vegetarian-friendly when dining at family-style restaurants.
145	"Moped Operandi"	January 29, 2014
Having just moved into a new neighborhood, Amanda wants to buy a motor scooter to commute. Her husband believes it would be too dangerous.
146	"Command Quit"	February 5, 2014
A father and son disagree on the limits of video game play.
147	"A Trial of Two Cities"	February 12, 2014
Which city is better: Philadelphia or Raleigh, North Carolina? Expert witness Jon Wurster.
148	"Science Friction"	February 19, 2014
Christine tries to convince her sister that science fiction is a worthwhile genre. Expert witness Jane Espenson.
149	"Honk If You Love Justice"	February 26, 2014
Wes accuses his friend Adam of overusing his car horn.
150	"J'Accuzzi!"	March 5, 2014
Brothers Corbin and Chas debate whether they should encourage their parents to build a pool on the family farmstead.
151	"Sic Semper Dramatis"	March 12, 2014
Will is embarrassed by his brother's habit of making scenes and being overly dramatic.
152	"Arraigning Cats and Dogs"	March 19, 2014
Should Eileen and Tyler get a cat or a dog?
153	"God Save the Teen"	March 26, 2014
American teenager Callum has set his sights on going to college in Edinburgh, Scotland, but his brother thinks he'd be happier staying in the United States.
154	"Visitation Rights"	April 2, 2014
How often should Ross make an effort to visit his best friend Kevin?
155	"The Perp Walk"	April 9, 2014
Lisa is alarmed by her husband's jaywalking habit.
156	"Two's Company"	April 16, 2014
Bruce has lied to his family by telling them that his roommate, Margaret, is a man. Is Bruce obligated to tell the truth, and how should he do it? Jesse Thorn fills in as judge.
157	"Honey Don't"	April 24, 2014
Lani is annoyed with her husband's insistence on doing most of the household chores. Jesse Thorn fills in as judge. Expert witness Mary Roach.
158	"Tipping the Scales of Justice"	April 30, 2014
Is it appropriate to tip housekeeping and service workers with coins, rather than bills?
159	"The Waiting Game"	May 7, 2014
Mollie accuses her husband Geoff of taking too much time plotting his next moves when they play board games.
160	"The French Correction"	May 15, 2014
Allison and Anthony debate whether they should speak English or French in their hometown of Montreal. Expert witness Jonathan Goldstein.
161	"Cold Case"	May 22, 2014
Should Dominik and Laura get an air conditioner?
162	"Laissez Hair"	May 28, 2014
Must Beau continue to dye his wife Leala's hair each month, or should she start going to a professional hair salon?
163	"Backseat Jiver"	June 4, 2014
Zaki and Michelle fight over control of the audio playlist for their long car rides.
164	"O Brother, Where Parked Thou?"	June 11, 2014
Should Stephanie or Mitch get the rights to their house's best parking spot?
165	"Wake Me Up Before You Go, Bro"	June 18, 2014
Declan does not want to bear any more responsibility for waking up his older brother in the morning.
166	"My Legal Pony"	June 25, 2014
Are Nancy's Shetland ponies ill-mannered?
167	"Brocavore"	July 2, 2014
May brothers Edmund and Garth take occasional liberties in their plan to raise all their own food for a year?
168	"Queasy Rider"	July 9, 2014
Katie tries to convince her boyfriend to ride The Twilight Zone Tower of Terror at Disney California Adventure. Expert witness comedian Mark Gagliardi
169	"Hunter-Gaveler"	July 16, 2014
Claire objects to her husband's desire to hunt on their property. Expert witness Jonathan Miles.
170	"Monte Belmonte Python"	July 25, 2014
May Beth add a python to her and Ross's growing pet collection?
171	"The Leisure Suit"	July 30, 2014
While on vacation, Stacey likes to start the day early while her boyfriend Greg prefers to sleep in and dawdle.
172	"Daily Security Beefing"	August 6, 2014
Jake and Janey disagree about the best methods of deterring burglaries in their high-crime neighborhood.
173	"Gross Misconduct"	August 14, 2014
Molly complains that her mother clips her fingernails at inappropriate times.
174	"Unreasonable Scorch and Leisure"	August 22, 2014
Steffen does not like to swim, and believes that his family throws too many pool parties.
175	"Failure to Appear"	September 10, 2014
Even though he doesn't enjoy traveling, should David visit his daughter in Norway?
176	"The Burden of Goof"	September 17, 2014
Michelle accuses her husband of being too much of a prankster.
177	"D-I-Why?!"	September 24, 2014
Should Chuck be allowed to fix his home renovation project himself, or must he hire a contractor to finish the job?
178	"In Chambers"	October 1, 2014
Docket episode
179	"Hear She, Shear He"	October 8, 2014
May Ryan be allowed to grow a beard, over the objections of his girlfriend?
180	"MaxFunWeek!"	October 15, 2014
Docket episode featuring Hrishikesh Hirway, Nate DiMeo, and Griffin McElroy.
181	"Amicus Grief"	October 22, 2014
Will believes his friend's adherence to her "friendship and acquaintance theory" only serves to alienate her from friends.
182	"Clearing the Docket"	October 29, 2014
Docket episode
183	"Vehicular Hound Inside"	November 5, 2014
Is Alexa's mom's habit of allowing her dog to do whatever it wants while traveling in her car unsafe for her and her dog?
184	"Return to Chambers"	November 12, 2014
Docket episode
185	"Campering with the Evidence"	November 19, 2014
Can a small trailer be converted into a camper, or should it be sold instead?
186	"The Commune-ish Manifesto"	November 26, 2014
Two women living on a commune disagree on whether to be upfront about their living situation to strangers, or claim that they are related.
187	"Cease and De-Thrift"	December 3, 2014
Mandy believes her husband buys and wears too many second-hand clothes, at the expense of his personal style.
188	"I Pledge a Grievance"	December 10, 2014
Should Christian and Corrin fly the flag of their favorite sports team on game days, or is that going too far?
189	"It's Beginning to Look a Lot Like Chambers"	December 17, 2014
Docket episode
190	"Pizza Parley"	December 24, 2014
Must Meredith and Jason abide by the terms of their "pizza truce" years after the fact?
191	"TL;DNR"	December 31, 2014
Andy attempts to compel his friend to complete her promise to read books in his favorite fantasy series.

== See also ==
- Judge John Hodgman
- List of Judge John Hodgman episodes (2015–present)
