= List of Judge John Hodgman episodes (2015–present) =

This is a list of Judge John Hodgman episodes produced and distributed since 2015 by Maximum Fun and hosted by humorist John Hodgman. Except where noted, every episode also features radio personality Jesse Thorn as co-host and "bailiff".

Since April 2012, titles of episodes are taken from suggestions posted on the show's official Facebook page by fans of the podcast.

Beginning in 2014, some episodes are dedicated to Hodgman and Thorn discussing and ruling on cases which were not selected for a full hearing. Each such episode in which they "clear the docket" is listed as a "docket episode" (in italics) in the episode description.

== Overview ==
| Year | Episodes | Originally Released | | |
| Year | Episodes | First Released | Last released | Distributor |
|---|---|---|---|---|
| 2010 | 8 | November 1, 2010 | December 20, 2010 | Maximum Fun |
| 2011 | 38 | January 3, 2011 | December 22, 2011 | Maximum Fun |
| 2012 | 44 | January 4, 2012 | December 26, 2012 | Maximum Fun |
| 2013 | 50 | January 2, 2013 | December 24, 2013 | Maximum Fun |
| 2014 | 51 | January 1, 2014 | December 31, 2014 | Maximum Fun |
| 2015 | 51 | January 7, 2015 | December 30, 2015 | Maximum Fun |
| 2016 | 51 | January 7, 2016 | December 28, 2016 | Maximum Fun |
| 2017 | 51 | January 4, 2017 | December 27, 2017 | Maximum Fun |
| 2018 | 51 | January 3, 2018 | December 20, 2018 | Maximum Fun |
| 2019 | 51 | January 2, 2019 | December 18, 2019 | Maximum Fun |
| 2020 | 52 | January 2, 2020 | December 30, 2020 | Maximum Fun |
| Special | 4 | January 13, 2011 | November 3, 2017 | Maximum Fun |

== 2015 ==
| No. | Episode Title | Guest Bailiff | Dispute | Release date |
|---|---|---|---|---|
| 192 | "Novus Annus, Novum Judicium" | | Docket episode | January 7, 2015 |
| 193 | "The Secret Room of Chambers" | | Docket episode | January 14, 2015 |
| 194 | "Do You Want to Hoard Some Snowglobes?" | | Jamie would like to dedicate a room in his house to his collection of Frozen merchandise, much to his husband's chagrin. Expert witnesses Robert Lopez and Kristen Anderson-Lopez | January 21, 2015 |
| 195 | "The Grandfather Claws" | | Melanie believes her partner, Josh, coddles his aging cat too much. | January 28, 2015 |
| 196 | "Mi Casa Es Shoeless Casa" | | Is Sean going overboard in insisting that all guests remove their shoes while inside his home? | February 4, 2015 |
| 197 | "The Hodgman Dubbel" | | Docket episode | February 11, 2015 |
| 198 | "Spit Decision, Live from SF Sketchfest" | | Debb's habit of asking her friend Bridget for and then eating her pre-chewed gum is grossing out Bridget. Episode recorded live at the Marines' Memorial Theatre in San Francisco as a part of SF Sketchfest and features performances by John Vanderslice and A-1 and expert witness Mary Roach. | February 18, 2015 |
| 199 | "Legalhosen" | Monte Belmonte | Lessa believes her husband's extensive sock collection has gotten out of hand. | February 25, 2015 |
| 200 | "Bigfoot II" | | Docket episode | March 4, 2015 |
| 201 | "Sweet Relish" | | Docket episode | March 11, 2015 |
| 202 | "Impersona Non Grata" | | May Brendan continue using his Hulk parody Twitter account which uses his friend Dana's real name, over Dana's objections? Expert witness Jon Ronson. | March 18, 2015 |
| 203 | "Habeas Spiritus" | | Rachael strongly believes in psychic abilities while her boyfriend Anton is a complete skeptic. Must he go to a psychic with her at least once? Expert witness Carrie Poppy. | March 25, 2015 |
| 204 | "The Puck Stops Here" | | Steve attempts to cajole his friend Scott into playing one more season of recreation league ice hockey. | April 1, 2015 |
| 205 | "Schnapp Judgment" | | Eric is annoyed by the snotty comments of his friend Jonas over their choices of preferred alcoholic beverages. | April 9, 2015 |
| 206 | "Moon and Stars" | | Docket episode | April 15, 2015 |
| 207 | "The Defense Rests" | | Jon doesn't approve of his roommate Anna's tendency to go to bed early when they host house parties together. | April 22, 2015 |
| 208 | "Sunrise Upset" | Jean Grae | Colin's desire to set his alarm clock to rise with the sun every morning is annoying his wife. | April 29, 2015 |
| 209 | "Kung Fu Fighting with Jean Grae" | Jean Grae | Docket episode | May 6, 2015 |
| 210 | "Judgin' Like It's 1992" | | Docket episode | May 13, 2015 |
| 211 | "The Downer Party" | | A wife who enjoys birthdays and her husband who does not cannot agree on how to celebrate their children's birthdays. | May 20, 2015 |
| 212 | "Reduce, Reuse, Accuse" | | Someone is repeatedly stealing Elliot and Rachel's recycling bins. How far should they go in their attempts to catch the culprit? | May 27, 2015 |
| 213 | "Just the Two of Us" | | Docket episode | June 3, 2015 |
| 214 | "The Santa Suit" | | A professional Santa Claus would like to portray the character all year long, over the objections of his wife. | June 11, 2015 |
| 215 | "Great Balls of Ire" | | Living next door to a public park, Aron and Molly often have balls thrown and kicked in their yard by playing children, and do not agree on how best to return them. | June 17, 2015 |
| 216 | "An Alchemic Clark Bar of Delight" | | Docket episode | June 24, 2015 |
| 217 | "Battle of the Podcast Stars" | | Docket episode | July 1, 2015 |
| 218 | "Troll-o Contendere" | Monte Belmonte | When a friend posts a controversial opinion on Facebook, is Brandon entitled to respond? | July 15, 2015 |
| 219 | "Axed and Answered" | Monte Belmonte | Would buying and displaying a decorative ax break Jen's rule against weapons in her home? | July 22, 2015 |
| 220 | "Good Time Summertime Docket Clearin'" | Monte Belmonte | Docket episode | July 30, 2015 |
| 221 | "I Want My nth TV" | Monte Belmonte | Caroline wants to limit her household to one television only; her husband Steve would like a few more. | August 5, 2015 |
| 222 | "Eminent Toe-main" | | Does wearing a certain pair of shoes in one's yard constitute wearing them "in public"? | August 12, 2015 |
| 223 | "Waiting For the Drop" | | Docket episode | August 19, 2015 |
| 224 | "Justice De-furred" | Monte Belmonte | Steve and Brenica disagree on how often their pet-soiled sheets should be washed. | August 28, 2015 |
| 225 | "Go Set a Tip Jar" | Monte Belmonte | The organizers of a literary reading series debate whether they should ask for donations from their patrons. | September 2, 2015 |
| 226 | "A Nothingburger Sort of Thing to Do" | Jean Grae | Docket episode | September 10, 2015 |
| 227 | "No-show Contendre" | Jean Grae | When the time for Ted and Chris' plans comes, Chris will often become unreachable and not show up. Is Chris in the wrong? | September 17, 2015 |
| 228 | "Feliz Gravitas" | Paul F. Tompkins | How should siblings Rolland and Nyssa go about restarting their family's Christmas traditions? | September 23, 2015 |
| 229 | "Rewind is a Sometimes Command" | Paul F. Tompkins | Docket episode | September 30, 2015 |
| 230 | "It May or May Not Take a Village" | Theresa Thorn | A pair of new parents disagree on whether they should seek new friendships with other parents or focus on the childless friends they already have. Guest judge Biz Ellis of the One Bad Mother podcast | October 7, 2015 |
| 231 | "The Hard of Hearing" | | Must Reed's dad try a hearing aid? | October 14, 2015 |
| 232 | "Oh, Goodie" | | Docket episode | October 22, 2015 |
| 233 | "The Slight Freaks" | Elliott Kalan | Docket episode | October 29, 2015 |
| 234 | "Shut Your Pious Hole" | | The wife of a Unitarian minister living in a conservative town believes they should be discreet in describing his occupation to strangers. | November 6, 2015 |
| 235 | "Grime and Punishment" | David Rees | Should Fran and Ben hire a housecleaner? | November 11, 2015 |
| 236 | "A Little Dockey" | | Docket episode | November 18, 2015 |
| 237 | "Trial By Kombat" | David Rees | Laura refuses to play Mortal Kombat with Austin because she believes he has gotten too good at the game. | November 25, 2015 |
| 238 | "Pedantry of My Own" | | Docket episode | December 2, 2015 |
| 239 | "Textual Harassment" | | Molly believes her friend Hector texts her too much. | December 10, 2015 |
| 240 | "Hockey Dockey Christmas" | | Docket episode | December 17, 2015 |
| 241 | "Guilty as Charred" | | Should Simone and Julian make use of the built-in grill in their home, or buy a kettle grill? | December 24, 2015 |
| 242 | "The Long-Sleeved Arm of the Law" | | May Jon wear one of his tank tops in hot weather over the objections of his wife? | December 30, 2015 |

== 2016 ==
| No. | Episode Title | Guest Bailiff(s) | Dispute | Release date |
|---|---|---|---|---|
| 243 | "The Nog Tank" | | Docket episode | January 7, 2016 |
| 244 | "Commedia della Morte" | | Joseph insists that his children hire a mime for his funeral. | January 14, 2016 |
| 245 | "Live at SF Sketchfest 2016" | | "Beyond a Reasonable Drought": Patricia doesn't approve of her boyfriend's methods of collecting greywater. "A Portrait of the Artist as a Weird Dad": George would like his dad to cease leaving unusual photographs for him to find. Episode recorded live at the Marines' Memorial Theatre in San Francisco as a part of SF Sketchfest and features a performance by Thao Nguyen | January 21, 2016 |
| 246 | "Miami Memories" | | Docket episode | January 28, 2016 |
| 247 | "Bros Before Globes" | | Noah accuses his friend Eric of traveling too much, at the expense of their friendship. | February 3, 2016 |
| 248 | "The Glass-Action Lawsuit" | | Claiming they are not attractive, Jessica refuses to wear her low-grade prescription glasses. | February 10, 2016 |
| 249 | "A Toast to Serra Angels" | | Docket episode | February 17, 2016 |
| 250 | "Phone of Contention" | | Kevin refuses to answer his cell phone or respond to messages in a timely matter, to the consternation of his wife. | February 24, 2016 |
| 251 | "Wrecks Libris" | Monte Belmonte | Jeanna believes her husband Craig mistreats books by folding the corners of pages and using the books as doorstops. | March 2, 2016 |
| 252 | "The Cradle of Pizza Civilization" | | Docket episode | March 9, 2016 |
| 253 | "Decease and Desist" | | Marc would like to honor his deceased dog by reconstructing and displaying its skeleton, much to the disapproval of his wife. Expert witness Dr. Robert Hicks, director of the Mütter Museum. | March 16, 2016 |
| 254 | "Greasy Rider" | | A professional cook often leaves his grease- and food-stained aprons in his car, stinking it up. His girlfriend would like him to work harder to keep the car clean and odor-free. Expert witness Alton Brown. | March 23, 2016 |
| 255 | "Anecdontal Evidence" | | Are stories about work valid exceptions to Bob and Alessandra's "no boring stories" policy? Expert witness Teresa McElroy, of the Shmanners podcast. | March 30, 2016 |
| 256 | "Baggage Claims" | | Ty thinks her partner Zach is going overboard in his zest to earn and use frequent flier miles. | April 6, 2016 |
| 257 | "Jesse Finds a Crux" | | Docket episode | April 13, 2016 |
| 258 | "In Moto Parentis" | | Leigh doesn't believe her son Duncan is ready to use a motorcycle. | April 20, 2016 |
| 259 | "No Acquitting For Taste" | | Abtin and Kelsey disagree on which direction their home decor should go: "Classy" or "Quirky"? | April 27, 2016 |
| 260 | "All Laws Are Off" | | Docket episode | May 4, 2016 |
| 261 | "Grand Theft Risotto" | | Mike accuses his mother of passing off his wife's recipes as her own. Expert witness J. Kenji López-Alt, Managing Culinary Director of Serious Eats. | May 11, 2016 |
| 262 | "Capital T and That Rhymes With P and That Stands for Justice" | | Docket episode | May 18, 2016 |
| 263 | "In Combat Chambers" | | Docket episode | May 25, 2016 |
| 264 | "Paw and Order" | | Martha would like to nix her boyfriend Chase's plan to take their cats out for walks on leashes. Expert witness Monica Murphy, veterinarian and author. | June 1, 2016 |
| 265 | "Dad Nauseum" | | Kevin insists on telling the same suspect joke to any service worker he interacts with, to the embarrassment of his son, Daniel. | June 8, 2016 |
| 266 | "Exit Stage Fright" | | Tom encourages his friend Trinity to overcome her hesitation and audition for roles in community theater musicals. Expert witness Andrew, from the episode "Sic Semper Dramatis" | June 15, 2016 |
| 267 | "Deadly Poke Bush" | | Docket episode | June 22, 106 |
| 268 | "Assault and Hey Batter Battery" | | Is Spenser too aggressive in the amount of heckling he does while attending sporting events? | June 29, 2016 |
| 269 | "Object the Halls With Boughs of Justice" | | After he and Hal had come to agree following a debate that A Christmas Story is the best Christmas movie, Mark now regrets the choice and would like to award the title to It's a Wonderful Life. | July 6, 2016 |
| 270 | "The Night to Remain Silent" | | Actress N'Jameh likes to memorize her lines in bed as she falls asleep each night, but the practice is disturbing her boyfriend's ability to sleep. | July 13, 2016 |
| 271 | "Divan Judgment | Monte Belmonte | Should Glenys and Jim buy a sofa for their living room? | July 27, 2016 |
| 272 | "On Advice of Console" | Monte Belmonte | Jason is opposed to his wife's plan of buying a video game console for their two children | August 3, 2016 |
| 273 | "Big Chomp" | | Docket Episode | August 10, 2016 |
| 274 | "This is the Sound of a Raffle" | Dave Shumka & Graham Clark | May the members of Stephanie and Sewit's community service group purchase raffle tickets at the group's fundraising events? | August 17, 2016 |
| 275 | "Motion to Strike a Pose" | Dave Shumka & Graham Clark | Should fiancés Justin and Sarah take professionally shot engagement photos? | August 24, 2016 |
| 276 | "Hallmark of Justice" | Monte Belmonte | Jayson argues that he should not be obligated to buy a card for his wife on Mother's Day. | August 31, 206 |
| 277 | "Mommy Nearest" | Monte Belmonte | Amy has begun to work out at the same gym as her daughter Julie. Must Amy acquiesce to Julie's demand that they go at separate times? | September 9, 2016 |
| 278 | "Feast and Desist" | Monte Belmonte | Fiancés Kandace and Weston debate whether they should continue to host their annual "Friendsgiving" dinner parties or pass the duties to another one of their friends. | September 16, 2016 |
| 279 | "Blind Justice" | Monte Belmonte & Joel Mann | Docket Episode | September 21, 2016 |
| 280 | "Improvable Cause" | | Should Madeline and Jason's improv group try out the new format Madeline is advocating? | September 29, 2016 |
| 281 | "Separation of Church and Date" | | Does attending weddings with religious elements count as going to church? | October 5, 2016 |
| 282 | "Live From Portland, Maine 2016" | | "Text of Kin": Must Hannah be compelled to upgrade her cell phone so she can send text messages? "Triple Word Scorn": Colin accuses his fiancée Jordan of playing him too aggressively during board games, even when it prevents Jordan from winning herself. Episode recorded live at the Port City Music Hall in Portland, Maine and features performances from Joel Mann and David Raitt. | October 12, 2016 |
| 283 | "Pile of Pits" | | Docket Episode | October 19, 2016 |
| 284 | "Live From Turners Falls, MA 2016" | Monte Belmonte | "May It Please the Shorts": Mary Kate disapproves of her husband Matthew's habit of wearing swim trunks to bed. "Amphibious Corpus": Is a tadpole a "baby frog"? Episode recorded live at the Shea Theater Arts Center in Turners Falls, Massachusetts and features a performance from Zara Bode. Expert witness Emily Brewster of Merriam-Webster. | October 28, 2016 |
| 285 | "Hostile Fitness" | | Heather would like for her husband Joe to continue challenging her mother through a fitness tracking app, but he is hesitant. | November 2, 2016 |
| 286 | "Grass Action Lawsuit" | | Fiancées Daniel and Bernadette cannot agree on what kind of front yard they would like for their future home: maintained or overgrown. | November 9, 2016 |
| 287 | "A Betrayal of Crust" | | Should Cam and Valerie confess to Cam's mother that the "Pie of the Month" club subscription they gave her was completely fictional and all the pies she received were baked by them? | November 16, 2016 |
| 288 | "Are We Fair Yet?" | Jean Grae | Should Jeff and Megan split driving duties on their long car trips equally? | November 23, 2016 |
| 289 | "Live From Boston, MA 2016" | | "Sole Custody": Brian is overwhelmed by the size of his wife's shoe collection. "Law and Gag Order": Heena wants to relax at home by watching House Hunters, but is annoyed that her husband Tim "hate watches" the show with her, and often makes snarky comments. Episode recorded live at the Wilbur Theatre in Boston, Massachusetts and features a performance by Juliana Hatfield. Expert witness Ken Reid. | November 30, 2016 |
| 290 | "A Jury of Your Tears" | Jean Grae | Glenn enjoys making quesadillas several times each week, but the constant odor that the cooking creates is distressing his roommate, Donny. | December 7, 2016 |
| 291 | "First Whirlpool Problems" | | What type of hot tub should Courtney and Josh install in their home, and where should it go? | December 14, 2016 |
| 292 | "Conifer Emptor" | | After years of using an artificial Christmas tree, Husbands Michael and Matthew cannot agree on whether the time has come to purchase a real one. | December 21, 2016 |
| 293 | "Woodsy Bob Newhart" | | Docket episode featuring Nick Offerman | December 28, 2016 |

== 2017 ==
| No. | Episode Title | Guest Bailiff | Dispute | Release date |
|---|---|---|---|---|
| 294 | "Live From Brooklyn, NY 2016" | | "Shut Your Drawer Hole": Rob is annoyed that his girlfriend Kaitlin claims to be too busy to bother closing dresser drawers after she is done using them. "The Most Important Trial of the Day": Charlie works late nights and often eats his first meal of the day in the afternoon. Does he have a right to refer to the meal as "breakfast"? Episode recorded live at the Bell House in Brooklyn, New York and features a performance by the PitchBlak Brass Band | January 4, 2017 |
| 295 | "The Hallowed Y'alls of Justice" | | Dale enjoys adopting the local accent of wherever she travels to, much to the embarrassment of her daughter, Alexandra. | January 11, 2017 |
| 296 | "Witnessing the Badger" | | Young father Tobyas is concerned that his wife Rachel frequently rescues animals in distress. | January 18, 2017 |
| 297 | "First Come, First Seat, Third Served" | | Docket episode | January 25, 2017 |
| 298 | "Live From Brooklyn, NY 2016, Part 2" | | "Good Coif, Bad Coif": John cuts his hair himself by using a Flowbee, leading to disastrous results, according to his wife Mariah. "Silence of the Jams": Are novice trumpeter Sam's practice sessions annoying his neighbors? Episode recorded live at the Bell House in Brooklyn, New York, and features a performance by Jean Grae and the PitchBlak Brass Band. | February 1, 2017 |
| 299 | "When I Say Justice, You Say Served" | | When a live performer calls for audience participation (e.g. singing along), must Kevin join in despite his dislike of the practice? | February 8, 2017 |
| 300 | "Robe Hate Court" | | May Oge keep wearing his much-beloved, 25-year-old bathrobe, or must he get a new one? | February 15, 2017 |
| 301 | "Married to the Ghost of George Washington" | | Docket Episode | February 22, 2017 |
| 302 | "Live From Philadelphia, PA 2016" | | "Un Chien En Deluge": Neighbors Karen and TC advocate to their respective spouses for outfitting their dogs with appropriate weather attire. Episode recorded live at the Trocadero Theatre in Philadelphia, Pennsylvania, and features a live performance by Cynthia Hopkins. Special guest Robert Hicks of the Mütter Museum. | March 1, 2017 |
| 303 | "Oculus Miffed" | | Virtual reality gamers Matt and Amber debate whether they should install a dedicated gaming room in their master bedroom. | March 8, 2017 |
| 304 | "The Emoluments Pause" | | Arguing that her and Aaron's kids have too many toys already, Tamara asks for a year-long moratorium on new toys. | March 15, 2017 |
| 305 | "In-lawful Gathering" | | Five nights a week, Reuben and his wife Megan have dinner with extended family. Rob would like to opt out. | March 22, 2017 |
| 306 | "DNA NDA" | | Xander wants his twin brother Brendan to take a zygosity test to determine whether their twinship is identical or fraternal; Brendan would rather not. | March 29, 2017 |
| 307 | "Too Many Cooks Spoil the Borth" | | Docket episode, featuring Kurt Braunohler | April 5, 2017 |
| 308 | "Live From Washington DC" | | "Rabius Corpus": Lauren would like to get a pet raccoon; her boyfriend Tony is against it. Expert witness: Ray Suarez. Plus, Sean and Jaime from Episode 194, "Do You Want to Hoard Some Snowglobes?" return. Episode recorded live at the Howard Theatre in Washington, D.C., featuring a performance by The Dom Flemons Trio. | April 12, 2017 |
| 309 | "Justice Extruded is Justice Denied" | | Micah wants to get a 3D printer; his girlfriend Jenny thinks there isn't enough room for one in their current apartment. | April 19, 2017 |
| 310 | "In Flagrante Delicto" | | Sarah accuses her husband Eric of wearing his American flag pants at inappropriate occasions. | April 26, 2017 |
| 311 | "Live From the London Podcast Festival" | | "Pleading the Fifth": Will, the fourth son in his family line with that name, wants to continue the tradition by giving the name to a future son, but his wife objects to the practice. Episode recorded at Kings Place in London for the London Podcast Festival and features a performance by Emmy the Great. | May 3, 2017 |
| 312 | "New Schemes to Violate the Social Contract" | | Docket episode | May 10, 2017 |
| 313 | "Sisterhood of the Gaveling Pants" | | Sisters Zoe and Mara disagree on whether Mara should return the clothes she's "borrowed" from Zoe. | May 17, 2017 |
| 314 | "Vehicular Man-Squatter" | | May John continue to live in his car, or must he find another place to live? | May 24, 2017 |
| 315 | "Scaritime Law" | | Ethan would like to spend one night aboard the ocean liner Queen Mary2 with his girlfriend Jayla, but Jayla objects, fearing the ship is haunted by ghosts. | May 31, 2017 |
| 316 | "Live From SF Sketchfest 2017" | | "Hieronymous Quash": May Zack hang an "unsettling" print created by his grandmother, over his girlfriend's objections? “Property Bothers”: Are neighbors David and Genaro "eco-hoarding"? Episode recorded at Marine's Memorial Theater in San Francisco as a part of SF Sketchfest and features a performance by Sara Watkins. | June 7, 2017 |
| 317 | "Deep in the Misanthropy Hole" | | Docket episode | June 14, 2017 |
| 318 | "Innjustice" | | Fiancés Luke and Quay cannot agree if the onsite cabins at their wedding venue should be apportioned to each side equally, or proportionally based on the number of guests each is inviting. | June 21, 2017 |
| 319 | "Common Law Carriage" | | May Mac borrow his girlfriend's car whenever he wants, or must he ask for her permission each time? | June 28, 2017 |
| 320 | "Might as Well Judge" | | A debate over the musical merits of Michael Anthony, longtime bassist for Van Halen. | July 5, 2017 |
| 321 | "Live in Chicago at Very Very Fun Day 2017" | Jean Grae | “Seeking Redress” Episode recorded in Chicago and features a performance by Saba. | July 12, 2017 |
| 322 | "Muzzbarketing and Morning Beverages" | | Docket episode | July 19, 2017 |
| 323 | "Buffalo Wild Writs" | | When they travel together form work, should Glen and Rowena eat at the same chain restaurants, or try out a variety of places? | July 26, 2017 |
| 324 | "Burden of Pooch" | Monte Belmonte | Having fulfilled Rob's dream of owning an Old English Sheepdog, his wife Kate feels that she is doing a majority of the dog care, and feels resentful. | August 2, 2017 |
| 325 | "Nap Judgment" | Monte Belmonte | When they vacation together, spouses Ann and Stephen disagree if they should keep their regular sleep schedule or allow themselves to sleep in. | August 9, 2017 |
| 326 | "Sport reform" | | Tom has been teaching his eight-year-old son that it is acceptable to fake an injury during soccer games, but his wife feels this is unethical. | August 16, 2017 |
| 327 | "Little Weirdsies" | | Docket episode, featuring Linda Holmes | August 23, 2017 |
| 328 | "Fudgie the Bail" | | Aaron loves to bake cakes for every special event, but his wife Kate feels the time and effort could be put into better use. | August 30, 2017 |
| 329 | "He Bed, She Bed" | | Should spouses Tom and Myranda sleep together or in separate rooms? | September 6, 2017 |
| 330 | "Planted Evidence" | | Mercedes loves to take clippings from plants and trees in public areas and plant them in her garden. Is this stealing? | September 20, 2017 |
| 331 | "Live From Brooklyn, NY 2017" | | “Statute of Imitations”: Episode recorded at The Bell House in Brooklyn, and features a performance by Carsie Blanton. | September 27, 2017 |
| 332 | "A Podcast for the Problemless" | | Docket episode, featuring Jonathan Coulton. | October 4, 2017 |
| 333 | "Live from the London Podcast Festival 2017" | | "Crypto Facto”: Episode recorded at Kings Place in London, and features a performance by Serafina Steer. | October 11, 2017 |
| 334 | "Pro Patink All the Way" | | Docket episode | October 18, 2017 |
| 335 | "Public Befriender" | | Heather accuses her husband Larry of spending too much time chatting with people when they run errands together. | October 25, 2017 |
| 336 | "Turing Testimony" | | Is Phillipa spending too much time texting with a chatbot? | November 1, 2017 |
| 337 | "Live from the London Podcast Festival 2017, Part 2" | | “Scarflaw”: Episode recorded at Kings Place in London, and features a performance by Barbarossa. | November 8, 2017 |
| 338 | "Phantom Stereo Repair Shop" | | Docket episode | November 15, 2017 |
| 339 | "Marco? Justice!" | | Should Nate and Pam install a swimming pool at their new home? | November 22, 2017 |
| 340 | "Grouse Negligence" | | Spouses Kasey and Josh disagree on how often Josh may be allowed to go on hunting trips. | November 29, 2017 |
| 341 | "Ayn Rand Out!" | | Docket episode | December 6, 2017 |
| 342 | "Seating Arraignments" | | Does Zach need to add a chair to his living room? | December 13, 2017 |
| 343 | "Lodging: A Complaint" | | Katie and Briton disagree on whether they should always stay overnight when they visit Katie's parents. | December 20, 2017 |
| 344 | "Coq Au Ban" | | Must Gideon's chickens be caged or allowed to roam free? | December 27, 2017 |

== 2018 ==
| No. | Episode Title | Guest Bailiff | Dispute | Release date |
|---|---|---|---|---|
| 345 | "Chandler Braggin' on Beeps" | | Docket episode | January 3, 2018 |
| 346 | "Check Pleas" | | | January 10, 2018 |
| 347 | "Live From San Francisco Sketchfest, 2018" | | | January 17, 2018 |
| 348 | "Moral High Ground vs. Moral Pit" | | | January 24, 2018 |
| 349 | "Transcendental Irritation" | | | January 31, 2018 |
| 350 | "Duplo Jeopardy" | | | February 7, 2018 |
| 351 | "Tux Evasion" | | | February 14, 2018 |
| 352 | "The Battlestar Galactist Generation" | | Docket episode | February 21, 2018 |
| 353 | "Shut Your Spy Hole!" | | | February 28, 2018 |
| 354 | "Undisclosed Financial Settlement of Catan" | | | March 7, 2018 |
| 355 | "Judge's Court, Judge's Rules" | | | March 14, 2018 |
| 356 | "Refrigerator Firefighter" | | Docket episode | March 21, 2018 |
| 357 | "Legal Jar Gone" | | | March 28, 2018 |
| 358 | "Chips Annoy!" | | | April 4, 2018 |
| 359 | "Beyond a Reasonable Bout" | | | April 11, 2018 |
| 360 | "Yappy Trails" | | | April 18, 2018 |
| 361 | "Tambourine With the Evidence" | | | April 25, 2018 |
| 362 | "The Most Beautiful Man in Jurisprudence" | | Docket episode | May 2, 2018 |
| 363 | "Eminent Bromain" | | | May 9, 2018 |
| 364 | "Wedding Clashers" | | | May 16, 2018 |
| 365 | "Across State Felines" | | | May 23, 2018 |
| 366 | "Dance Like No One is Showering" | | | May 30, 2018 |
| 367 | "Live From Chicago, 2018" | | | June 6, 2018 |
| 368 | "The Whistle Throne" | | | June 13, 2018 |
| 369 | "The Booth, the Whole Booth, and Nothing But the Booth" | | | June 20, 2018 |
| 370 | "Live From Chicago 2018, Part 2" | | | June 27, 2018 |
| 371 | "Into the Teal" | | Docket episode | July 4, 2018 |
| 372 | "Edible Arraignments" | | | July 11, 2018 |
| 373 | "Much Ado About Clothing" | Monte Belmonte | | July 18, 2018 |
| 374 | "Statute of Celebrations" | Monte Belmonte | | July 25, 2018 |
| 375 | "Swipe Right to Remain Silent" | Cristela Alonzo | | August 1, 2018 |
| 376 | "Nein Tense of the Law" | Maeve Higgins | | August 8, 2018 |
| 377 | "Waffle House Arrest" | Maeve Higgins | | August 15, 2018 |
| 378 | "Jerseyprudence" | | | August 22, 2018 |
| 379 | "Race Closed" | | | August 29, 2018 |
| 380 | "Don't Call the Next Witness" | | | September 5, 2018 |
| 381 | "Jerky Duty" | | | September 12, 2018 |
| 382 | "Classic Friendaround" | Jean Grae | Docket episode | September 19, 2018 |
| 383 | "Requesting an Immediate Ingestion" | | | September 26, 2018 |
| 384 | "Remodel Behavior" | | | October 3, 2018 |
| 385 | "The JJHo Old Timey Newsreel" | | Docket episode | October 10, 2018 |
| 386 | "R and Arbitration" | | | October 17, 2018 |
| 387 | "Slunch Buggy No Punch Backs" | | Docket episode | October 24, 2018 |
| 388 | "Cos-plagiarism" | | | October 31, 2018 |
| 389 | "Verdict Through the Grapevine" | | | November 7, 2018 |
| 390 | "Me-maw & Order" | | | November 14, 2018 |
| 391 | "Pizza is a Gift" | | Docket episode | November 21, 2018 |
| 392 | "Torch Reform" | | | November 28, 2018 |
| 393 | "What An Age We Live In" | | Docket episode | December 5, 2018 |
| 394 | "Juris-diction" | | | December 12, 2018 |
| 395 | "Wreathing Havoc" | | | December 19, 2018 |

== 2019 ==
| No. | Episode Title | Guest Bailiff | Dispute | Release date |
|---|---|---|---|---|
| 396 | "Small Names Court" | | | January 2, 2019 |
| 397 | "Quid Pro Ho Ho Ho" | | | January 9, 2019 |
| 398 | "Spider Buddies" | | | January 16, 2019 |
| 399 | "Contempt of Carport" | | | January 23, 2019 |
| 400 | "Live From Vancouver 2019" | | | January 30, 2019 |
| 401 | "Throwin’ Bows" | | | February 6, 2019 |
| 402 | "Double Histameanor" | | | February 13, 2019 |
| 403 | "Live From Seattle 2019" | | | February 20, 2019 |
| 404 | "Live From Portland, Oregon" | | | February 27, 2019 |
| 405 | "Inbox, Outbox, Catbox, Birdbox" | | | March 6, 2019 |
| 406 | "Tic or Tac" | | | March 13, 2019 |
| 407 | "280 Character Witness" | | | March 20, 2019 |
| 408 | "Forced Arbor-tration" | | | March 27, 2019 |
| 409 | "Live From San Francisco Sketchfest 2019" | | | April 3, 2019 |
| 410 | "Life Hacks With Judge John Hodgman" | | | April 10, 2019 |
| 411 | "Yankee Boot Swap" | | | April 17, 2019 |
| 412 | "And Baby Makes Plea" | | | April 24, 2019 |
| 413 | "Live From Los Angeles 2019" | | | May 1, 2019 |
| 414 | "Making Stock, Taking Stock" | | | May 8, 2019 |
| 415 | "Gesundfight" | | | May 15, 2019 |
| 416 | "Open House Arrest" | | | May 22, 2019 |
| 417 | "Moms Are Gonna Mom" | | | May 29, 2019 |
| 418 | "Bitter Bean Juice" | | | June 5, 2019 |
| 419 | "Live From Los Angeles at the Regent Theater 2019" | | | June 12, 2019 |
| 420 | "Misappropriation of Funs" | | | June 19, 2019 |
| 421 | "Spirit World of the Law" | | | June 26, 2019 |
| 422 | "Law Cucaracha" | | | July 3, 2019 |
| 423 | "Niles and Dobbs" | | | July 10, 2019 |
| 424 | "Barbecuties" | | | July 17, 2019 |
| 425 | "Aiding and A-Petting" | | | July 24, 2019 |
| 426 | "Blob Justice" | | | July 31, 2019 |
| 427 | "Coda Conduct" | | | August 7, 2019 |
| 428 | "Side Effects May Include Justice" | | | August 14, 2019 |
| 429 | "Tough Talk with LeVar Burton" | | | August 21, 2019 |
| 430 | "The Smoking Pun" | | | August 28, 2019 |
| 431 | "This Is the Sound of a Gamble" | | | September 4, 2019 |
| 432 | "Dowager Mayor" | | | September 11, 2019 |
| 433 | "Achoodication" | | | September 18, 2019 |
| 434 | "Sluice Juice" | | | September 25, 2019 |
| 435 | "Snickerdoodiligence" | | | October 2, 2019 |
| 436 | "The Skeleton Brief" | | | October 9, 2019 |
| 437 | "Stick and Move and No New Butterfinger" | | | October 16, 2019 |
| 438 | "You’ve Got Bail!" | | | October 23, 2019 |
| 439 | "Traffic Stopper" | | | October 30, 2019 |
| 440 | "Right to Redress" | | | November 6, 2019 |
| 441 | "Occam’s Frasier" | | | November 13, 2019 |
| 442 | "Live from Toronto at the Danforth Music Hall 2019" | | | November 20, 2019 |
| 443 | "Daylight Savings Crime" | | | November 27, 2019 |
| 444 | "Tried Green Tomatoes" | | | December 4, 2019 |
| 445 | "Reheat Offender" | | | December 11, 2019 |
| 446 | "Live in Durham at the Carolina Theatre 2019" | | | December 18, 2019 |

== 2020 ==
| No. | Episode Title | Guest Bailiff | Dispute | Release date |
|---|---|---|---|---|
| 447 | "There is No Diner Jail" | | | January 1, 2020 |
| 448 | "Edict of Worms" | | | January 8, 2020 |
| 449 | "German Engine Hearing" | | | January 15, 2020 |
| 450 | "Live in Atlanta at the Variety Playhouse 2019" | | | January 22, 2020 |
| 451 | "SerenDIPity" | | | January 29, 2020 |
| 452 | "Tattoos of Limitations" | | | February 5, 2020 |
| 453 | "Holiday Leftovers" | | | February 12, 2020 |
| 454 | "Live in Washington D.C. at the Lincoln Theatre" | | | February 19, 2020 |
| 455 | "The Magic of Leap Year" | | | February 26, 2020 |
| 456 | "A Zither Jam" | | | March 4, 2020 |
| 457 | "Objection! Sustainable" | | | March 11, 2020 |
| 458 | "Live From Portland Maine at the State Theatre" | | | March 18, 2020 |
| 459 | "Good Old Onion Shop" | | | March 25, 2020 |
| 460 | "The Hammer of Distraction" | | | April 1, 2020 |
| 461 | "The Ballad of Silvia, Fernando, and the Cat" | | | April 8, 2020 |
| 462 | "Live From Boston, MA at the Wilbur Theatre" | | | April 15, 2020 |
| 463 | "Live From the Murmrr Theatre in Brooklyn, NY" | | | April 22, 2020 |
| 464 | "Garbagemas Eve" | | | April 29, 2020 |
| 465 | "Licorice Adjacent Flavor" | | | May 6, 2020 |
| 466 | "Rights of Shirts Refusal" | | | May 13, 2020 |
| 467 | "Trash Action Lawsuit" | | | May 20, 2020 |
| 468 | "Live from SF Sketchfest 2020" | | | May 27, 2020 |
| 469 | "The Sponge Leaver’s Wife" | | | June 3, 2020 |
| 470 | "Judge of Sandwich, Massachusetts" | | | June 10, 2020 |
| 471 | "The Best of Weird Dads" | | | June 17, 2020 |
| 472 | "Dance Dance Resolution" | | | June 24, 2020 |
| 473 | "Trash Can Detective" | | | July 1, 2020 |
| 474 | "Office Supply Caper" | | | July 8, 2020 |
| 475 | "You Can’t Acquit With Us" | | | July 15, 2020 |
| 476 | "Vampirical Evidence" | | | July 22, 2020 |
| 477 | "Birthday Parties to the Dispute" | | | July 29, 2020 |
| 478 | "Animal Crossing Examination" | | | August 5, 2020 |
| 479 | "The Shears Club" | | | August 12, 2020 |
| 480 | "Neverlandmark Case" | | | August 19, 2020 |
| 481 | "Contempt of Torte" | | | August 26, 2020 |
| 482 | "Cobb Salad With Alan Ruck" | | | September 2, 2020 |
| 483 | "Here’s the Story" | | | September 9, 2020 |
| 484 | "Fun With Words and Lexicographer Emily Brewster" | | | September 16, 2020 |
| 485 | "Corn Husk Dolls and Pumpkinheads" | | | September 23, 2020 |
| 486 | "Tippecanoe and Zelda Too" | | | September 30, 2020 |
| 487 | "Brush with the Law | | | October 7, 2020 |
| 488 | "The Doctorow Doctrine" | | | October 14, 2020 |
| 489 | "Mr. Commode’s Wild Ride" | | | October 21, 2020 |
| 490 | "An Ampersand-Lopez Goof Party" | | | October 28, 2020 |
| 491 | "RERUN Die Flederhaus" | | | November 4, 2020 |
| 492 | "The Gentleman Leaf Thief" | | | November 11, 2020 |
| 493 | "Mr. Clicky Keys" | | | November 18, 2020 |
| 494 | "Cat-or-Dogical Imperative" | | | November 25, 2020 |
| 495 | "Jean’s Heat Lamp Terrarium" | | | December 2, 2020 |
| 496 | "A Gallon of Scallops" | | Docket episode | December 9, 2020 |
| 497 | "Grocery Store Quilts " | | Docket episode | December 16, 2020 |
| 498 | "A Rollicking Docket" | | Docket episode | December 30, 2020 |

== 2021 ==
| No. | Episode Title | Guest Bailiff | Dispute | Release date |
|---|---|---|---|---|
| 499 | "Maine’s Holiday Boy" | | Docket episode | January 6, 2021 |
| 500 | "You Can’t Stop Justice" | | | January 13, 2021 |
| 501 | "Willy and Nilly" | Josh Gondelman | Docket episode | January 20, 2021 |
| 502 | "Forensic Mom and Unnamed Creepout Boy" | | Docket episode | January 27, 2021 |
| 503 | "My Wife Likes it With Peaches" | | Docket episode | February 3, 2021 |
| 504 | "The Maine of Breakfast Cereals" | | Docket episode | February 10, 2021 |
| 505 | "There’s No Southwest in Space" | | Docket episode | February 17, 2021 |
| 506 | "The J Squad and Lil Monte" | Monte Belmonte | Docket episode | February 24, 2021 |
| 507 | "The Crumble One" | | Docket episode | March 3, 2021 |
| 508 | "Logging a Case in A-pellet Court " | | | March 10, 2021 |
| 509 | "The Crumble One" | | Docket episode | March 17, 2021 |
| 510 | "My Own Avocado Creation" | | Docket episode | March 24, 2021 |
| 511 | "Litter Crime" | | Docket episode | March 31, 2021 |
| 512 | "What Half Man Wrought" | | Docket episode | April 7, 2021 |
| 513 | "A Donut of One’s Own" | Josh Gondelman | Docket episode | April 14, 2021 |
| 514 | "This Illustrated Man" | | Docket episode | April 21, 2021 |
| 515 | "Peter Piper’s Prerogative" | | Docket episode | April 28, 2021 |
| 516 | "May It Please Descartes" | | | May 5, 2021 |
| 517 | "Amicus Beef" | | | May 12, 2021 |
| 518 | "There’s an APPellate Court for That" | | | May 19, 2021 |
| 519 | "Coke Or Grain" | | Docket episode | May 26, 2021 |
| 520 | "The Party Kitchen" | | Docket episode | June 2, 2021 |
| 521 | "The Mighty Eagle of Mid-Tier Comedy Performers" | | Docket episode | June 9, 2021 |
| 522 | "Hot Drink Legend" | | Docket episode | June 16, 2021 |
| 523 | "Docket Deep Cuts" | | Docket episode | June 23, 2021 |
| 524 | "Citation For Glittering" | | | June 30, 2021 |
| 525 | "Right to a Fair Earring" | Monte Belmonte | | July 14, 2021 |
| 526 | "What Else Is There to Do?" | | Docket episode | July 21, 2021 |
| 527 | "The Full Micky" | | Docket episode | July 28, 2021 |
| 528 | "Hubble Jeopardy" | | | August 4, 2021 |
| 529 | "Sweet Corn Season" | | Docket episode | August 11, 2021 |
| 530 | "Maine Hospitality" | | Docket episode | August 18, 2021 |
| 531 | "The Motion is Cary Granted" | | | August 25, 2021 |
| 532 | "The Return of Juvenile Court" | | Docket episode | September 1, 2021 |
| 533 | "Mr. G & Professor K" | | Docket episode | September 8, 2021 |
| 534 | "Live Upside Down or Die" | Monte Belmonte | Docket episode | September 15, 2021 |
| 535 | "Live Dangerously, Look Terribly" | | Docket episode | September 22, 2021 |
| 536 | "Double In-Dented-Ty" | | | September 29, 2021 |
| 537 | "Preliminary Herring" | | | October 6, 2021 |
| 538 | "Auntie Anne-icus Brief" | | Mark Gagliardi and Hal Lublin from We Got This with Mark and Hal re-hash a debate from their podcast over which is the best pretzel shape. | October 13, 2021 |
| 539 | "Fright Court" | | | October 20, 2021 |
| 540 | "Spooky Day, Spooky Night" | | Docket episode | October 27, 2021 |
| 541 | "Fancy Ducks vs Fancy Geese" | | Docket episode | November 3, 2021 |
| 542 | "Not Today, Satanbot" | | Docket episode | November 10, 2021 |
| 543 | "The Veil of Honor" | | Docket episode | November 17, 2021 |

== See also ==
- Judge John Hodgman
- List of Judge John Hodgman episodes (2010–2014)
