= Hair clipper =

Personal grooming tool

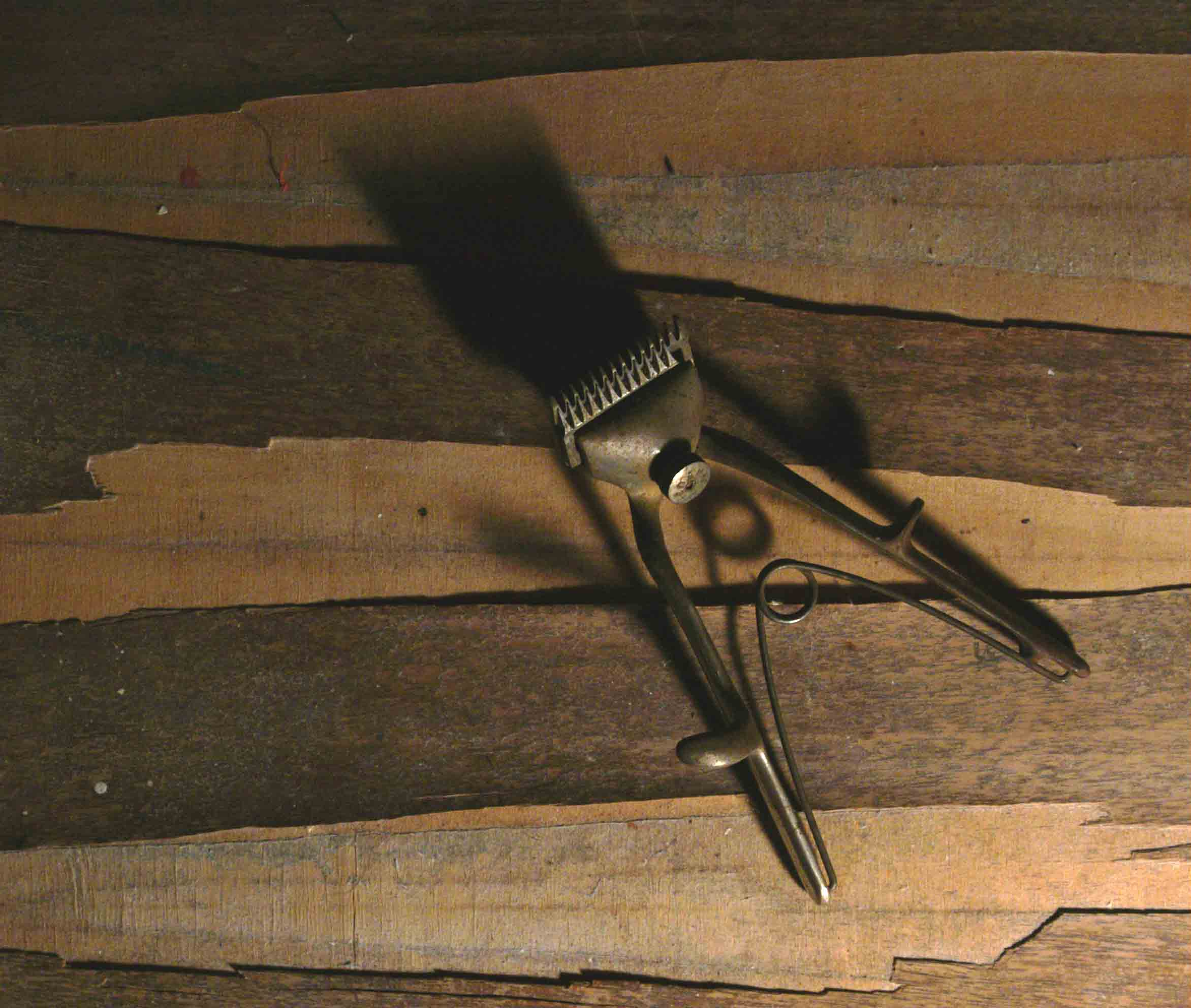
A manual beard clipper

A hair clipper, often individually called the apparent plurale tantum hair clippers (in a similar way to scissors), is a specialised tool used to cut human hair. Hair clippers work on the same principle as scissors, but are distinct from scissors themselves and razors. Similar but heavier-duty implements are used to shear sheep, but are called handpieces or machine shears.

== Operating principle ==
Hair clippers are made up of a pair of sharpened comb-like blades in close contact, one above the other, and the sides which slide sideways relative to each other, a mechanism which may be manual or electrical to make the blades oscillate from side to side, and a handle. The clipper is moved so that hair is positioned between the teeth of the comb, and cut with a scissor action when one blade slides sideways relative to the other. Friction between the blades needs to be as low as possible, which is attained by choice of material and finish, and frequent lubrication.

== Manual clippers ==
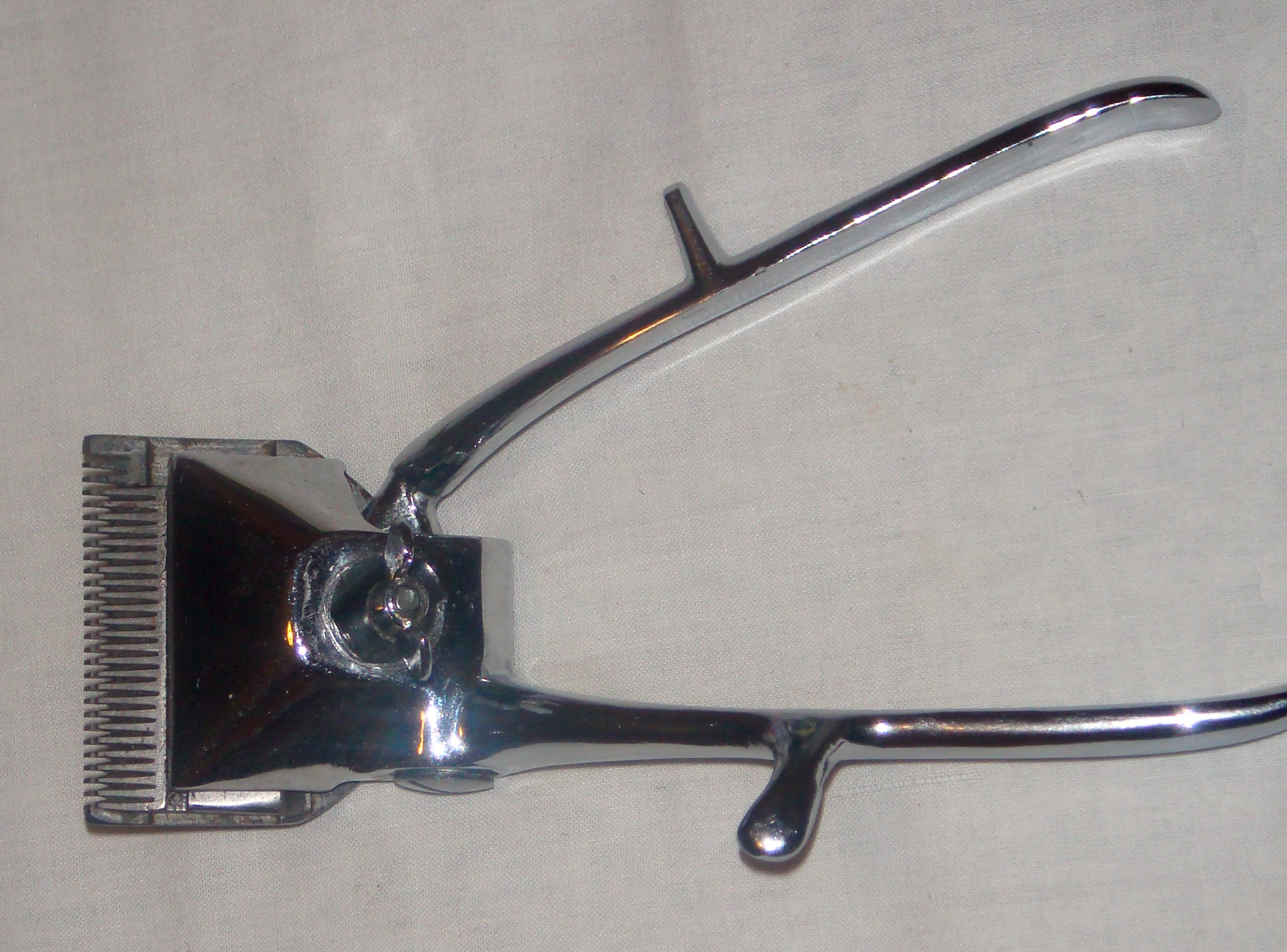
Manually operated clipper

Hair clippers are operated by a pair of handles which are alternately squeezed together and released. Barbers used them to cut hair close and fast. The hair was picked up in locks and the head was rapidly depilated. Such haircuts became popular among boys, mostly in schools, and young men in the military and in prisons.

Manual clippers were invented around 1855 by Nikola Bizumić, a Serbian barber. While they were widely used in the distant past, the advent and reduction in cost of electric hair clippers has led to them largely replacing manual clippers. Some barbers in Western countries continue to use them for trimming. They are also used in the Russian army: when conscripts enter boot camp, they cut their hair close to the skin, sometimes using manual clippers.

== Culture and religion ==
In Greece, male students had their heads shaved with manual hair clippers from the early 20th century until it was abolished in 1982. The same practice was used in the military, where recruits had their heads shaved as they set foot in boot camp. In the 1950s and 1960s a law was implemented in Greece whereby head shaving with manual clippers was to be used as a punishment for young people caught by police, such as teddyboys and prostitutes. This practice was extended to Greek hippies and leftist youths during the 1967-73 military regime. Obligatory hair clipping was abolished in Greece in 1982.

Manual hair clippers are used extensively by barbers in India to give short back and sides haircuts. Orthodox Jews tend to avoid clipping the side of their heads. Among Muslim men, some consider it haram to clip more than a fistful of the beard.

== Electric clippers ==
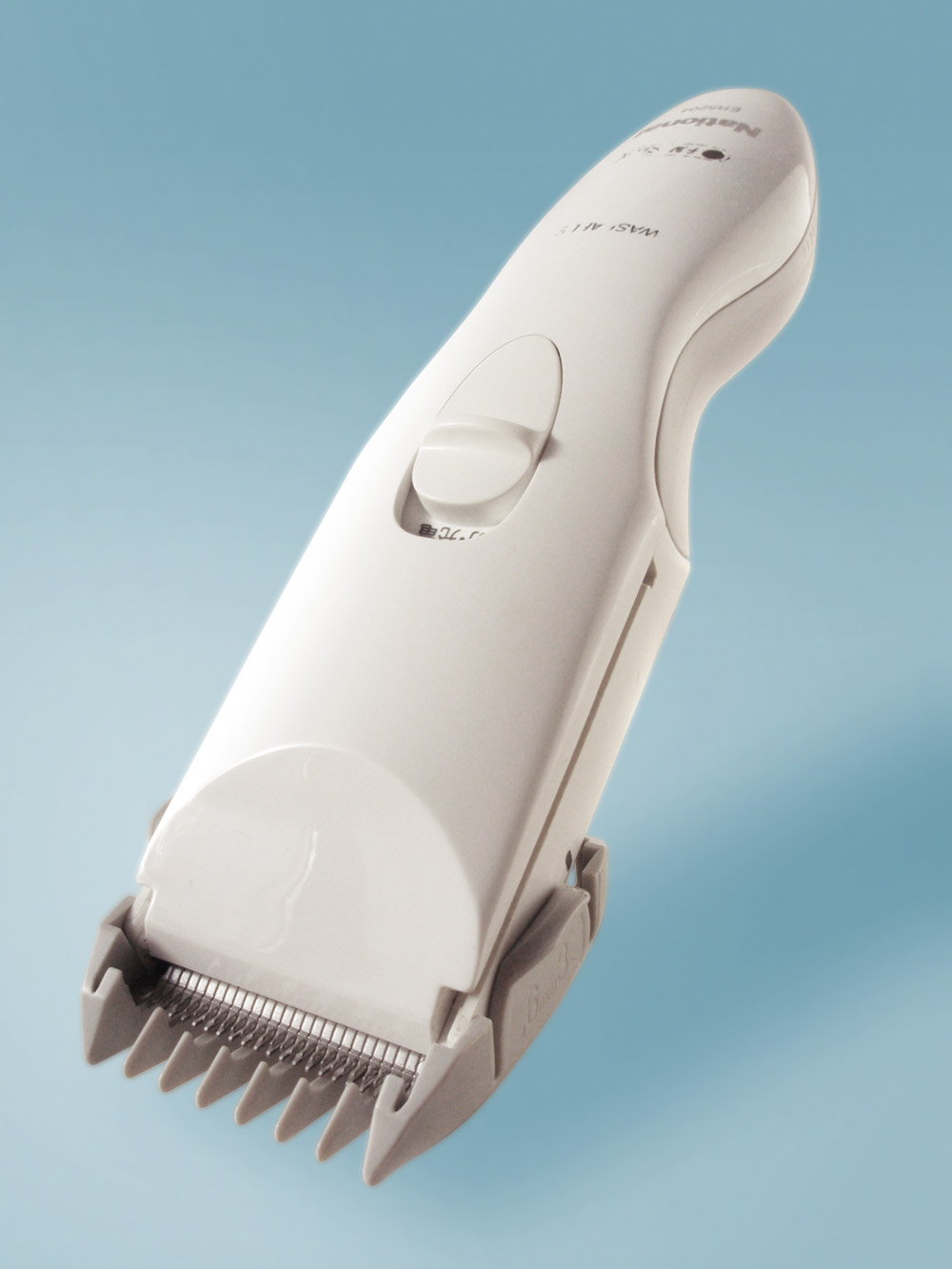
An electric trimmer

Electric hair clippers work in a similar way as manual ones, but are driven by an electric motor which makes the blades oscillate from side to side. They have gradually displaced manual hair clippers in many countries. Three different motor types are used in clipper production: magnetic, rotary and pivot. Rotary style may be driven by direct current or alternating current electricity source. Both magnetic and pivot style clippers use magnetic forces derived from winding copper wire around steel. Alternating current creates a cycle attracting and relaxing to a spring to create the speed and torque to drive the clipper cutter across the combing blade.

Leo J. Wahl invented the first electric hair clipper. He first designed a hand-held massager for his uncle, Dr. Frank Wahl. Frank Wahl opened a manufacturing plant in Sterling, Illinois to produce and sell Leo's massager. During this time, Leo would sell massagers to various barbers and noticed an opportunity to improve upon the tools barbers were using at the time.

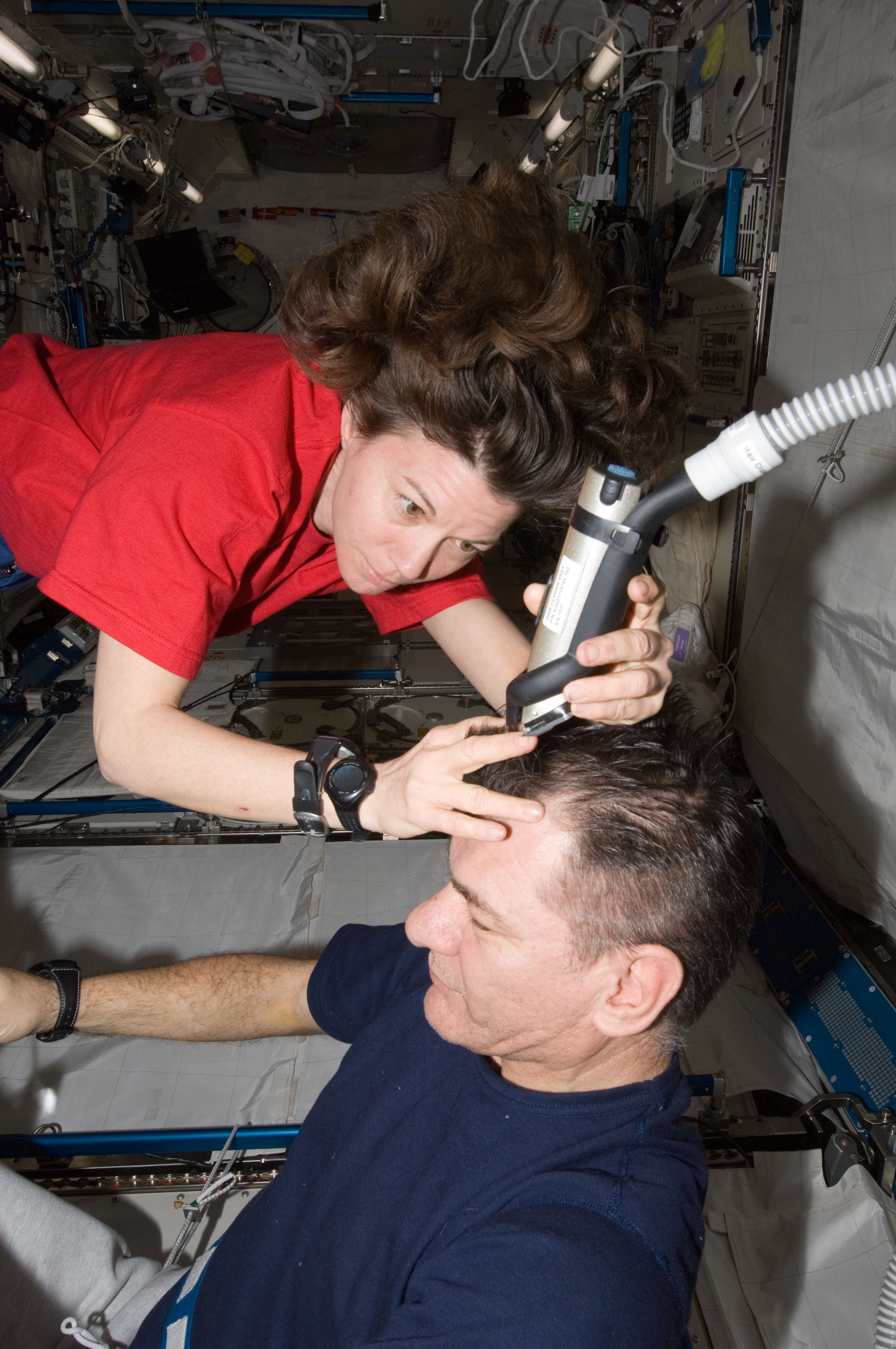
One astronaut trims the hair of another on the International Space Station (ISS). A Wahl clipper attached to a vacuum cleaner was used to remove the free-floating hair clippings.

Leo Wahl took over his uncle's manufacturing business after Frank left to serve in the Spanish–American War in 1898. Leo continued to work on his inventions and by 1921, he patented his final design of an invention more than a decade in the making- the first electric hair clipper. Within a year, Wahl Manufacturing had manufactured and sold thousands of clippers all over the United States and in 1921 Leo renamed the company the Wahl Clipper Corporation. When Leo J. Wahl died on May 20, 1957, he had over 100 patent applications to his name. His descendants still operate the company today.

By 1921, Mathew Andis Sr. entered the electric clipper industry. Production of these clippers began in the basement of his home, with help from Anna, his wife. Andis sold his electric clippers door to door and one year later established the Andis O M Manufacturing with John Oster and Henry Meltzer. After the three men parted ways, Mathew established Andis Clipper Company the following year. Today, Andis Company remains a family-held business.

In 1928, the John Oster Manufacturing Company joined the electric clipper market. In 1960, the John Oster Manufacturing Co. was acquired by Sunbeam Corporation. Oster continues to manufacture clippers today.

=== Maintenance ===
Electric hair clipper blades are usually lubricated frequently. Each major hair clipper manufacturer sells its own brand of hair clipper oil. Clippers can also be maintained with aerosol clipper spray which acts as a coolant, disinfectant, lubricant, cleaner, and rust preventative. It is possible to find out what is inside such a product by viewing the product's safety data sheet online. Wahl Hair Clipper Oil, for example, is simply mineral oil packaged in a bottle with a dropper tip.

Some maintenance-free clippers use very hard stainless-steel blades and do not need periodic application of oil or other lubricant.

Most magnetic-type consumer grade hair clippers use a vibrating motor that moves the blade at a high resonant frequency. Sometimes the motor will come out of tune and make a loud noise. There is a screw on the side that is used to retune the motor and bring it back into resonance.

=== Blades ===
Cutting blade type	Oster blade size	Common guard size	Hair remaining		
Cutting blade type	Oster blade size	Common guard size	Inches	Millimetres	Growth
Fine cutting blades (also referred to as zero blades)
Fine cutting blades (also referred to as zero blades)	#000000		1/250	0.10	5 hours
Fine cutting blades (also referred to as zero blades)	#00000		1/125	0.20	10 hours
Fine cutting blades (also referred to as zero blades)	#0000		1/100	0.25	15 hours
Fine cutting blades (also referred to as zero blades)	#0000A		1/75	0.34	20 hours
Fine cutting blades (also referred to as zero blades)	#000		1/50	0.51	1 day
Fine cutting blades (also referred to as zero blades)	#0A		3/64	1.2	1.75 days
Medium coarse cutting blades (#1, #1A, #1.5)
Medium coarse cutting blades (#1, #1A, #1.5)	#1	0.5	1/16	1.6	3.5 days
Medium coarse cutting blades (#1, #1A, #1.5)	#1A	1	1/8	3.2	1 week
Medium coarse cutting blades (#1, #1A, #1.5)	#1.5		5/32	4.0	8.75 days
Full coarse cutting blades (#1.75, #2, #3.5 and #3.75)
Full coarse cutting blades (#1.75, #2, #3.5 and #3.75)	#1.75	1.5	3/16	4.8	10.5 days
Full coarse cutting blades (#1.75, #2, #3.5 and #3.75)	#2	2	1/4	6.4	2 weeks
Full coarse cutting blades (#1.75, #2, #3.5 and #3.75)	#3.5	3	3/8	9.5	3 weeks
Full coarse cutting blades (#1.75, #2, #3.5 and #3.75)	#3.75	4	1/2	13	4 weeks
Longer cutting blades
Longer cutting blades	5/8 H/T	5	5/8	16	5 weeks
Longer cutting blades	3/4 H/T	6	3/4	19	6 weeks

== Blade material ==
Blades are usually made of rust-resistant stainless steel. Ceramic cutters are available; they are not subject to corrosion, and stay sharper longer because of a higher resistance to wear than metal blades. However, ceramic blades are brittle and easily broken, and more expensive to replace than metal blades.

== See also ==
- Flowbee
- Regular haircut
