= Eradication (novella) =

2026 novella by Jonathan Miles

- First edition cover
- Author: Jonathan Miles
- Language: English
- Genre: Fiction
- Publisher: Doubleday
- Publication date: February 10, 2026
- Media type: Print (Hardcover)
- Pages: 176
- ISBN: 978-0-385-55191-5

Eradication is a novella by Jonathan Miles, first published by Doubleday in February 2026. Following the death of his son, a school teacher takes a job on a remote island in the South Pacific, where he is tasked with killing several thousand invasive goats. Introduced some 150 years earlier by whalers, the goats have denuded the island and destroyed the native flora and fauna. The grieving protagonist faces a conflict between the ethics of shooting the animals and his mission to restore the island. He also meets two men illegally fishing for sharks, further complicating his job. The novella was met with a positive reception by reviewers in several publications, including The Washington Post and The New York Times.

== Background ==
Scott Simon of NPR noted that the novel carried echoes of The Lord of the Flies and The Old Man and the Sea. In an interview with Simon, Miles explained the influence of those works: "I think that everything that a novelist or really any artist reads or hears somehow gets metabolized into what we make. So were they conscious influences? I'm not sure. But were they there? Definitely." In another interview with The Orange County Register, Miles stated that he was naturally drawn to the novel's topic of ecological stewardship based on his prior experience as a journalist covering the outdoors.

== Plot ==
A small vessel drops Adi on the fictional island of Santa Flora in the South Pacific. He is equipped with a rifle, several thousand rounds of ammunition, and enough provisions to last 5 weeks. His employer, a foundation, hired him to cull the island's invasive goats, which have decimated native populations of birds and other animals. Initially not sure what it would entail, Adi takes the job after personal crises: his son has died and his wife has left him. At the beginning of his stay, he finds an injured bird after chasing a few goats into some brush. He makes a cage for the bird in his lodge and identifies it in an almanac as a species of warbler thought to be extinct. The bird strengthens his resolve to kill the goats, but he still procrastinates. When he does finally kill a goat, he attempts to carry it home to eat because he feels bad about leaving the carcass. The goat, however, is too heavy, and he gradually ends up hacking off pieces of it until only the legs remain.

While searching the islands, Adi comes across two men illegally fishing for sharks. They threaten to shoot him but back off after he explains his job. The fisherman draw a parallel between their slaughter of sharks and his killing of goats. Disturbed, he hopes to not see them again, and still struggling with shooting the goats, he devises a plan to eliminate just the male goats. Soon thereafter, he sees the fisherman dismembering a shark while it is still alive and throwing it back into the ocean. The next day, he finds them shooting at goats from their boat. While watching them, he thinks of his son's death. Two juvenile delinquents had been with his autistic son on the roof of their apartment building. He and his wife suspected that the boys goaded their son to jump. His wife wanted him to kill the two boys, but he refused and she left. The fisherman wave at Adi and motion for him to join in the killing of the goats. He lines up one of the men in the sights on his rifle and shoots him. He then finds the other man in his scope.

== Reception ==
Ron Charles of The Washington Post called the book "an instant classic". He viewed it as thought provoking and well constructed. Writing for The New York Times, Matt Bell also praised the novel's construction, viewing the protagonist's backstory as "a fable within the fable that sharpens and complicates these finely drawn moral dilemmas".
