= Neradin =

Neradin Нерадин (Serbian)
- Village (Selo)
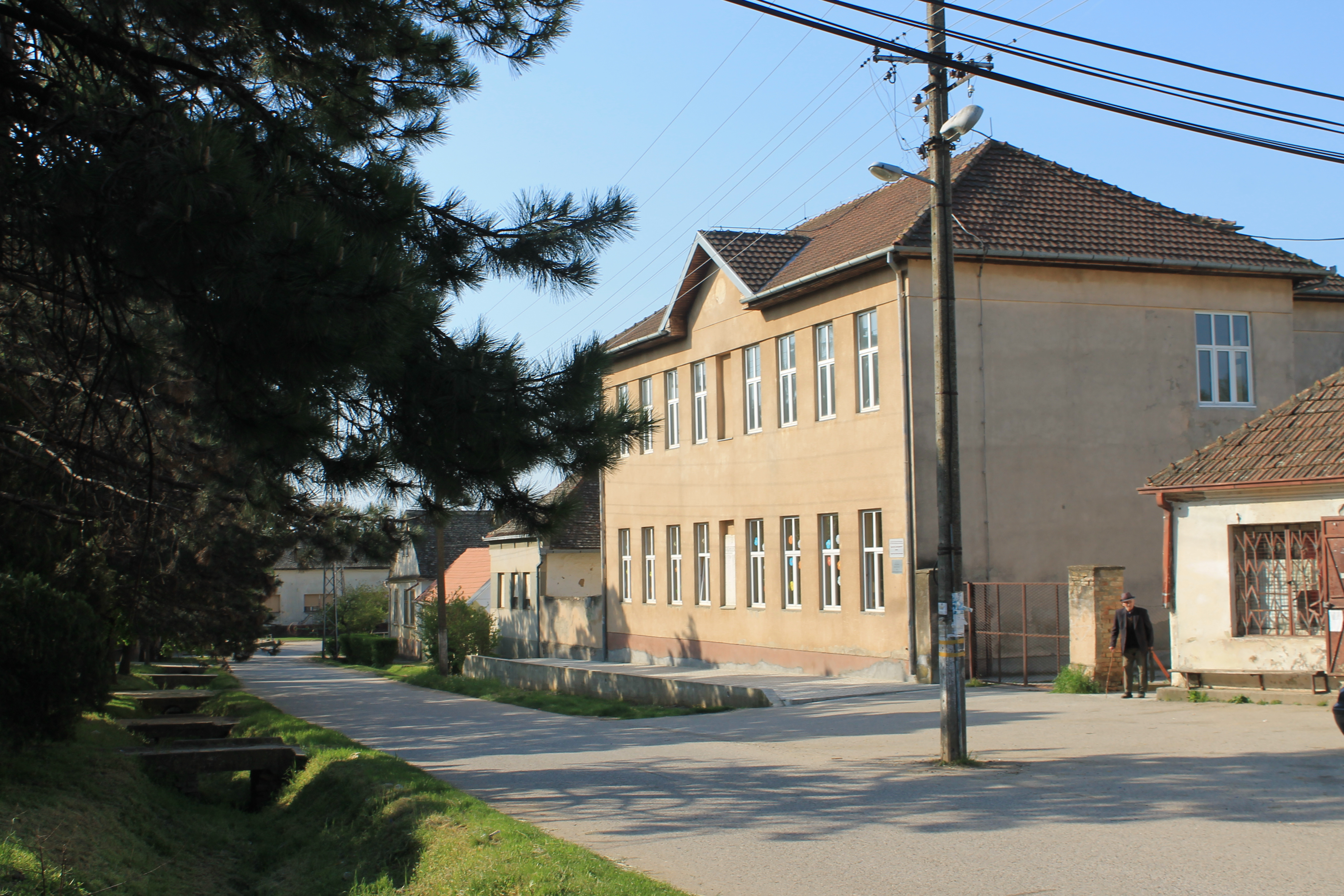

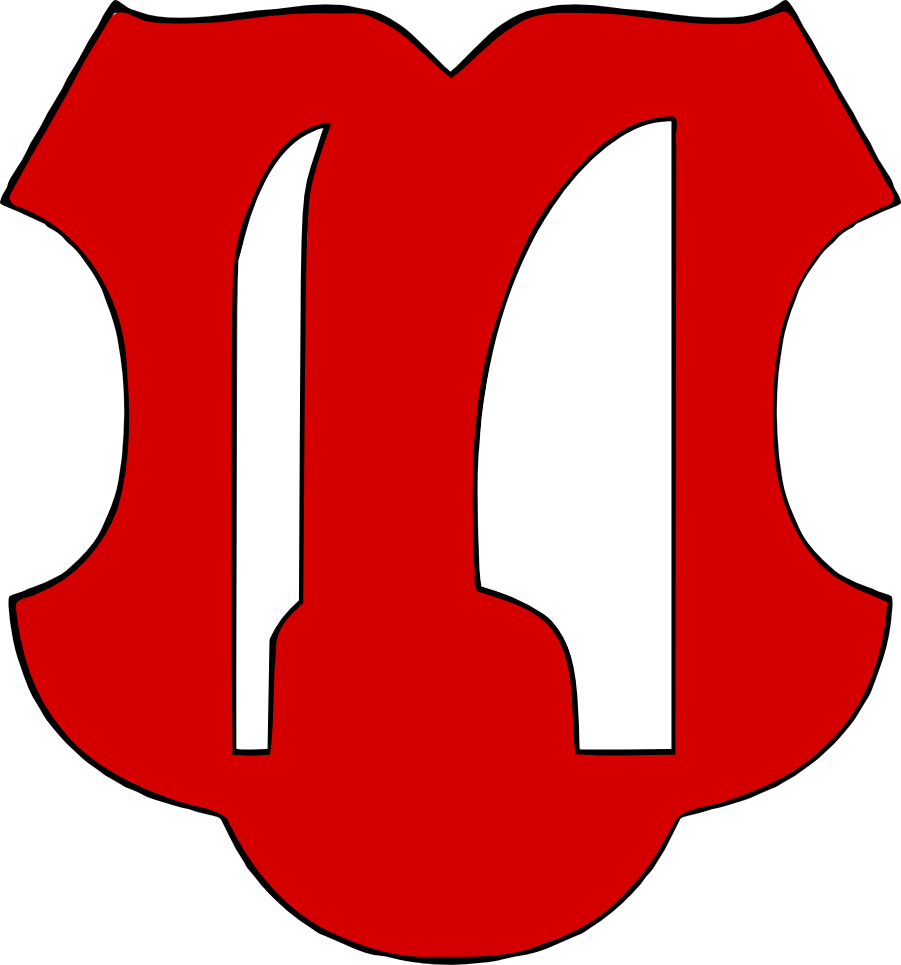
- Coat of arms
- Interactive map of Neradin
- Location within Vojvodina Location within Serbia Location within Europe
- Coordinates: 45°07′01″N 19°53′50″E
- Country: Serbia
- Province: Vojvodina
- District: Srem
- Municipality: Irig

Population (2022)
  - Total: 413
- Time zone: UTC+1 (CET)
  - Summer (DST): UTC+2 (CEST)

Neradin (Serbian Cyrillic: Нерадин) is a village in Serbia. It is situated in the Irig municipality, in the Srem District, Vojvodina province. The village has a Serb ethnic majority with a population of 413 people (2022 census).

== Trivia ==
Nikola Bizumić, inventor of the manually operated hair clipper, was born in Neradin. A former barber, he had an idea to create a clipper which would shorten the time for haircutting.

He was misunderstood by his countrymen in such places as Irig and Ruma. Disillusioned, he left for London, where around 1860 the first hair clipper was born.

Thanks to the invention, Bizumić gained enormous wealth. After his death, that money was left to the six generations of his relatives in Neradin. By fault of the administrative services of Syrmia at the time, they have never received the money.

== See also ==
- List of places in Serbia
- List of cities, towns and villages in Vojvodina
