= Wahl Clipper =

American manufacturer of grooming products

Wahl Clipper Corporation
- Founded: 1919; 107 years ago
- Founder: Leo J. Wahl
- Headquarters: Sterling, Illinois, United States
- Area served: Worldwide
- Key people: Leo J. Wahl
- Products: Grooming products
- Website: us.wahl.com

The Wahl Clipper Corporation is an American manufacturer of grooming products. It is headquartered in Sterling, Illinois.

== History ==
Wahl Clipper Corporation was founded due to Leo J. Wahl's patent for an electromagnetic hair clipper in 1919. On February 2, 1921, he purchased a majority of the stock of his uncle's manufacturing company which made the clipper, and incorporated the business as Wahl Clipper Corporation. In 1924, Leo Wahl patented a vibrating motor hair clipper.

In 1965 Wahl introduced the first vacuum clipper, which allowed a person's hair to be cut without use of a cape. The following year, Wahl produced the first cordless hair clipper using rechargeable battery technology.

In 1971, it started an electronics division with the first cordless and rechargeable soldering iron.

In 1975, Wahl released a line of back and foot massagers utilizing the vibrating motor technology used in their hair trimmers.

In 1984, Wahl invented the first cordless consumer beard and moustache trimmer, Groomsman Beard and Mustache Trimmer.

In 1987, Wahl launched Miami Device.

In 1996, Wahl acquired Moser Elektrogerate GmbH.

In 2001, it patented the first vacuuming consumer beard trimmer, the Trim N Vac. Wahl manufactures its clippers and trimmers in its own factories in Sterling, Illinois; parts come from Germany, England, China, and Hungary, while international plants are present in China, England, Australia, Canada, the Netherlands and Japan.

In 2006 Wahl licensed the For Dummies brand from Wiley publishing company and launched the Home Hair-cutting for Dummies product line.

== Presidents ==
- Leo J. Wahl
- Warren P. Wahl
- Jack Wahl
- Gregory Wahl
- Brian Wahl

== Brands ==
- Wahl
- Moser
- Lister
- Groom Ease

== Media gallery ==
Wahl clippers
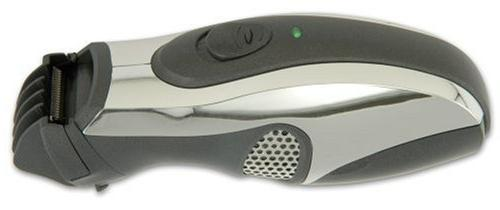

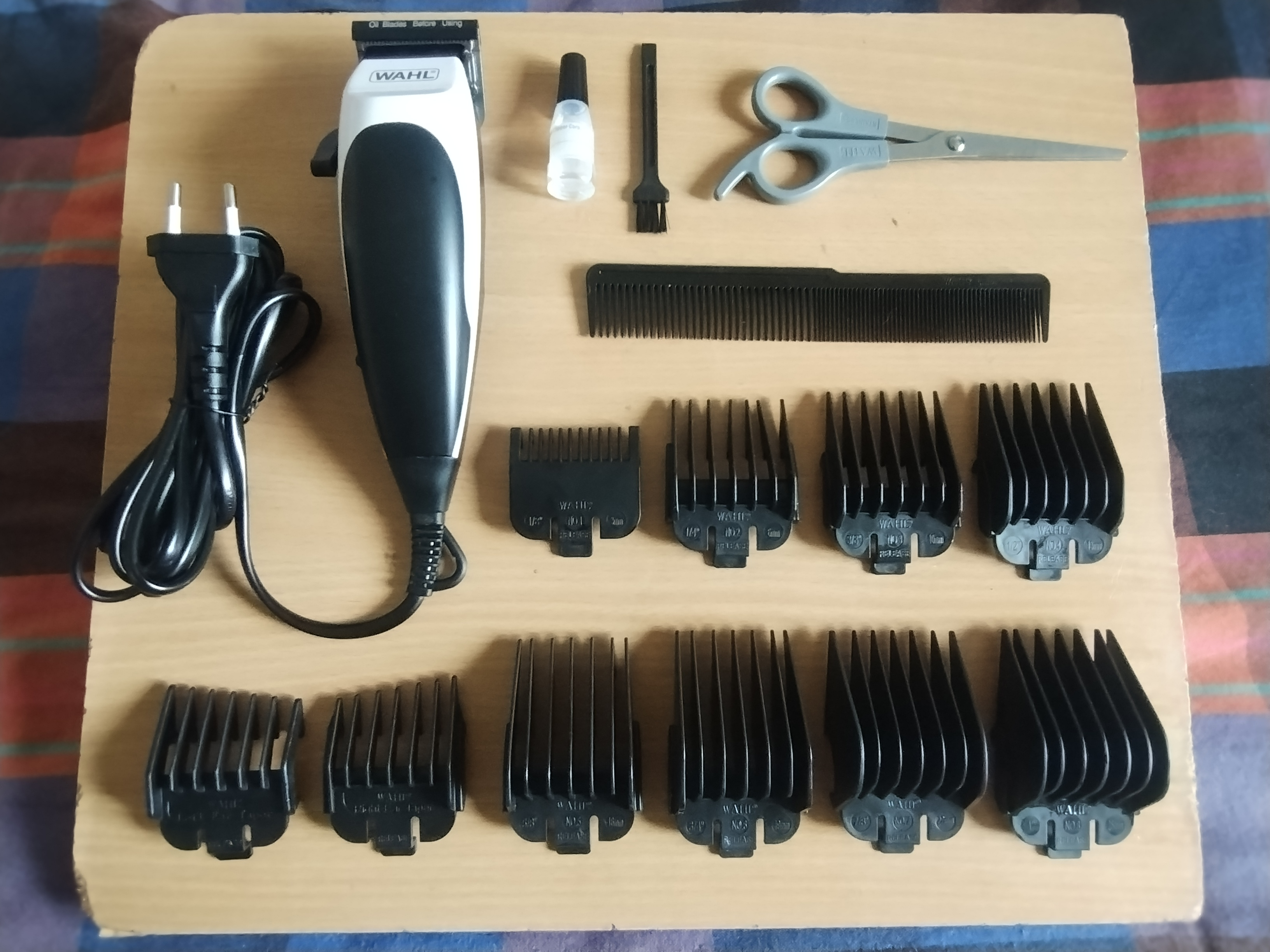

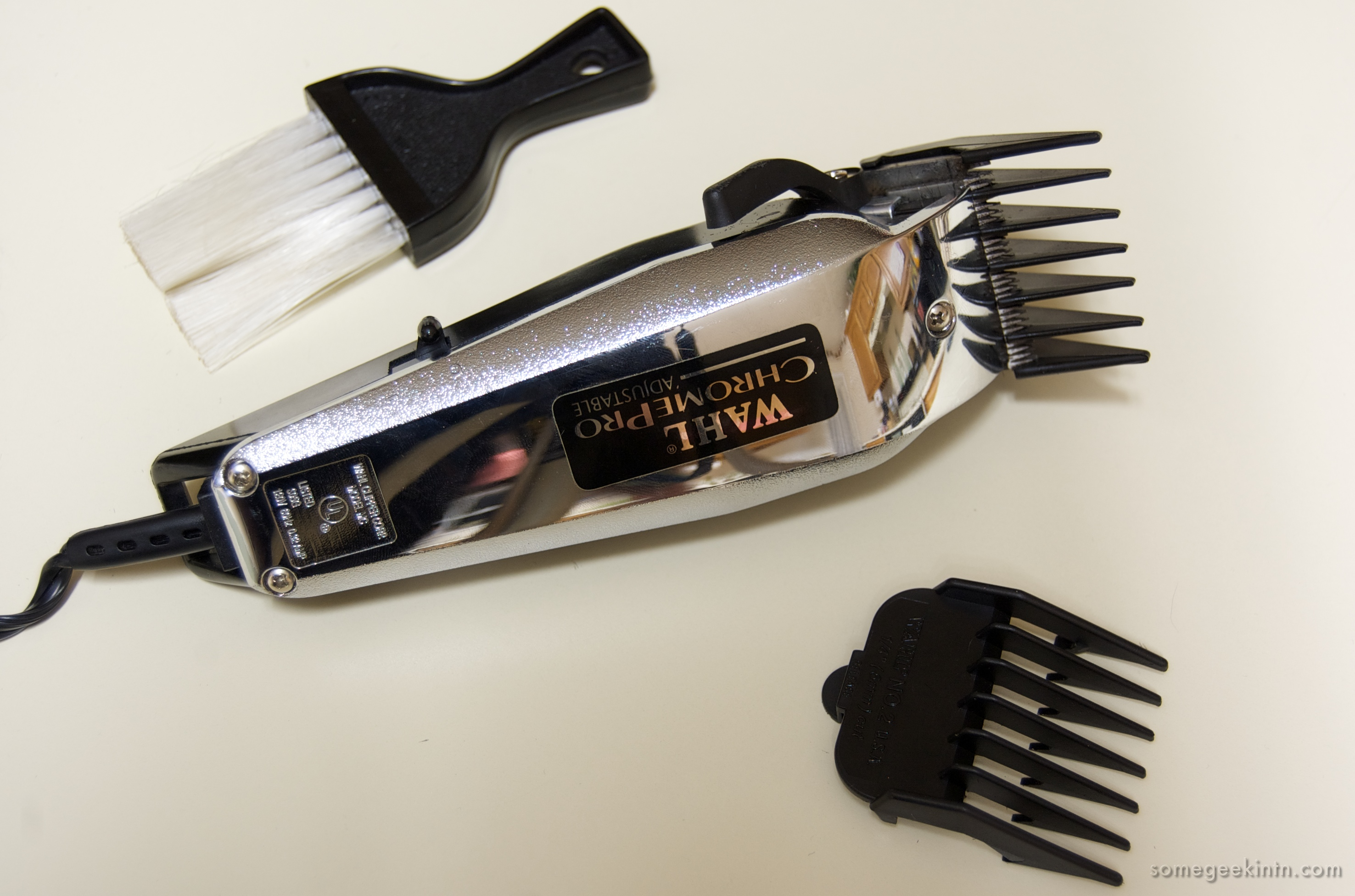

== See also ==
- Electric razors
- Electric shaving
