= Cardiff Coloured Men's Christian Association =

Cardiff-based christian organisation

The Cardiff Coloured Men's Christian Association was a Bible study and support organisation started in 1902 in the port city of Cardiff, Wales, and mainly serving sailors from Africa, the Caribbean, the Indian subcontinent, North and South America.

Rev. John Hervey Boudier, a white clergyman and temperance advocate, started the Cardiff Coloured Men's Christian Association with weekly meetings in St. Mary's vestry hall. Rev. Boudier soon founded dedicated quarters with a Coloured Men's Temperance Hotel in Cardiff, "The Moon and Stars," in 1904, and with an alcohol-free public house in Tiger Bay, "The Jolly Sailor," to serve the same visiting workers, who had few other options for respectable accommodation in the city.

At its peak, the Association counted as many as 800 members. To raise funds for their activities, the Association held concerts and exhibitions, such as a stunt cyclist riding backwards to the Moon and Stars Hotel.
