= Christopher Belmonte =

Radio personality in Western Massachusetts

Christopher "Monte" Belmonte (born 1978) is a radio personality in Western Massachusetts known for his fundraising event March for the Food Bank (originally "Monte's March"), which began in 2010.

The March for the Food Bank takes place over two days, covering 43 miles from Springfield to Greenfield, Massachusetts, with Belmonte often in costume. He is often joined by Congressman Jim McGovern. His 2020 march raised $614,577 for the Food Bank of Western Massachusetts. During the COVID pandemic many schools did "solidarity marches," doing local marches while raising money for local food banks.

Belmonte was a program director and morning show host at The River, WRSI, in the 6-10 am slot. He has also written about wine for the Valley Advocate. He has been a regular "funtime summertime guest bailiff" on Judge John Hodgman. He supports other charity projects, raising money with the Cancer Connection Campout, and serving as a judge for Stir Up Some Love, which raises money for the Treehouse Foundation. He was named one of Business West's "40 Under 40" in 2017, when he was 39. He is the board president of the Shea Theater in Turners Falls, Massachusetts.
