= Jonathan Miles (novelist) =

American journalist and novelist

- Born: January 28, 1971 (age 55); Cleveland, Ohio, U.S.
- Education: University of Mississippi
- Occupation: Writer
- Writing career
- Genres: Fiction, Nonfiction
- Notable work: Dear American Airlines
- Website: JonnyMiles.com

Jonathan Miles (born January 28, 1971) is an American novelist, journalist and musician. He is the author of the novels Dear American Airlines (2008); Want Not (2013); Anatomy of a Miracle: The True* Story of a Paralyzed Veteran, a Mississippi Convenience Store, a Vatican Investigation, and the Spectacular Perils of Grace (2018); and Eradication: A Fable (2026). He formerly wrote a biweekly column for the Styles section of the New York Times, and has contributed to magazines including GQ, Details, Field & Stream, and Garden & Gun.

== Early life ==
Jonathan Miles was born in Cleveland, Ohio; his family moved to Phoenix, Arizona, but Miles ran away when he was 17, moving to Oxford, Mississippi, eventually attending the University of Mississippi and taking a writing class with Barry Hannah. Finding work as a newspaper reporter and aspiring musician, Miles met novelist Larry Brown. The two became friends, and while Miles didn't graduate "Ole Miss", Brown taught and encouraged Miles to write: "It was an astonishing education. Some people go to the Iowa Writer's Workshop. I had Larry."

While Miles never studied journalism in college, his work soon found publication in a local literary magazine, the Oxford American, and he continued to contribute essays and critique for several years. A friend suggested Miles apply as a reporter for The Oxford Eagle, and while the pay wasn't good, being forced to churn out daily copy gradually improved his ability to write more dispassionately about complex and emotional subjects. Miles claims he was fired by the paper years later for writing an obituary about a subject who had admitted regularly providing bootlegged liquor to noted Oxford resident William Faulkner and correctly reporting the fact.

Fortunately, Miles's writing caught the eye of Esquire editor Will Blythe, who published an account Miles wrote of an ingenious prison escape he'd investigated while writing for the Oxford paper. Miles soon developed a reputation as a keen observer of Mississippi culture, selling essays to Food & Wine, Men's Journal and The New York Times Magazine. He credits his early literary voice to his time in Oxford, Mississippi, but when Men's Journal offered him an annual contract Miles was already driving a moving van toward New York City in search of such an opportunity.

== Literary career ==
His debut novel, Dear American Airlines, was published by Houghton Mifflin Harcourt in 2008. The novel written in the form of a complaint letter to the titular airline, was reviewed by Richard Russo in The New York Times Book Review, with Russo deeming it “wildly entertaining” and “not just philosophically but emotionally rewarding.” It was named The New York Times Book Review 100 notable books of 2008 (one of seven debut novels to be included), The Wall Street Journal dozen "most memorable" books of 2008, Los Angeles Times favorite books of 2008, Amazon.ca top 50 editors' picks for 2008 (#27), A.V. Club favorite books of 2008, the Borders Original Voices Award, and the Great Lakes Book Award.

His second novel, Want Not, was published by Houghton Mifflin Harcourt in 2013. Threading three plotlines around the subject of waste, it was named a New York Times Notable Book, a Kirkus Reviews “Best Books of 2013” selection, a Washington Post Notable Fiction of 2013 selection, and a Wall Street Journal Favorite Books of 2013. Reviewing it in the New York Times Book Review, Dave Eggers called Miles a “fluid, confident, and profoundly talented writer.”

Anatomy of a Miracle: The True* Story of a Paralyzed Veteran, a Mississippi Convenience Store, a Vatican Investigation, and the Spectacular Perils of Grace was published by Hogarth in 2018.

Eradication: A Fable is set to be published by Knopf Doubleday in 2026.

== Personal life ==
Miles lives in Hunterdon County, New Jersey with his wife Catherine, a wine importer, and their three children. As an accomplished harmonicist, he joined Jon Batiste’s band for Batiste’s first solo tour.

== Works ==
- Dear American Airlines (Boston: Houghton Mifflin Harcourt, 2008) ISBN 978-0-547-05401-8
- Want Not (Boston: Houghton Mifflin Harcourt, 2013) ISBN 978-0-547-35220-6
- Anatomy of a Miracle (Hogarth, 2018) ISBN 978-0553447583
- Eradication (Knopf Doubleday, 2026) ISBN 9780385551915
