= Flowbee =

Vacuum cleaner attachment for cutting hair

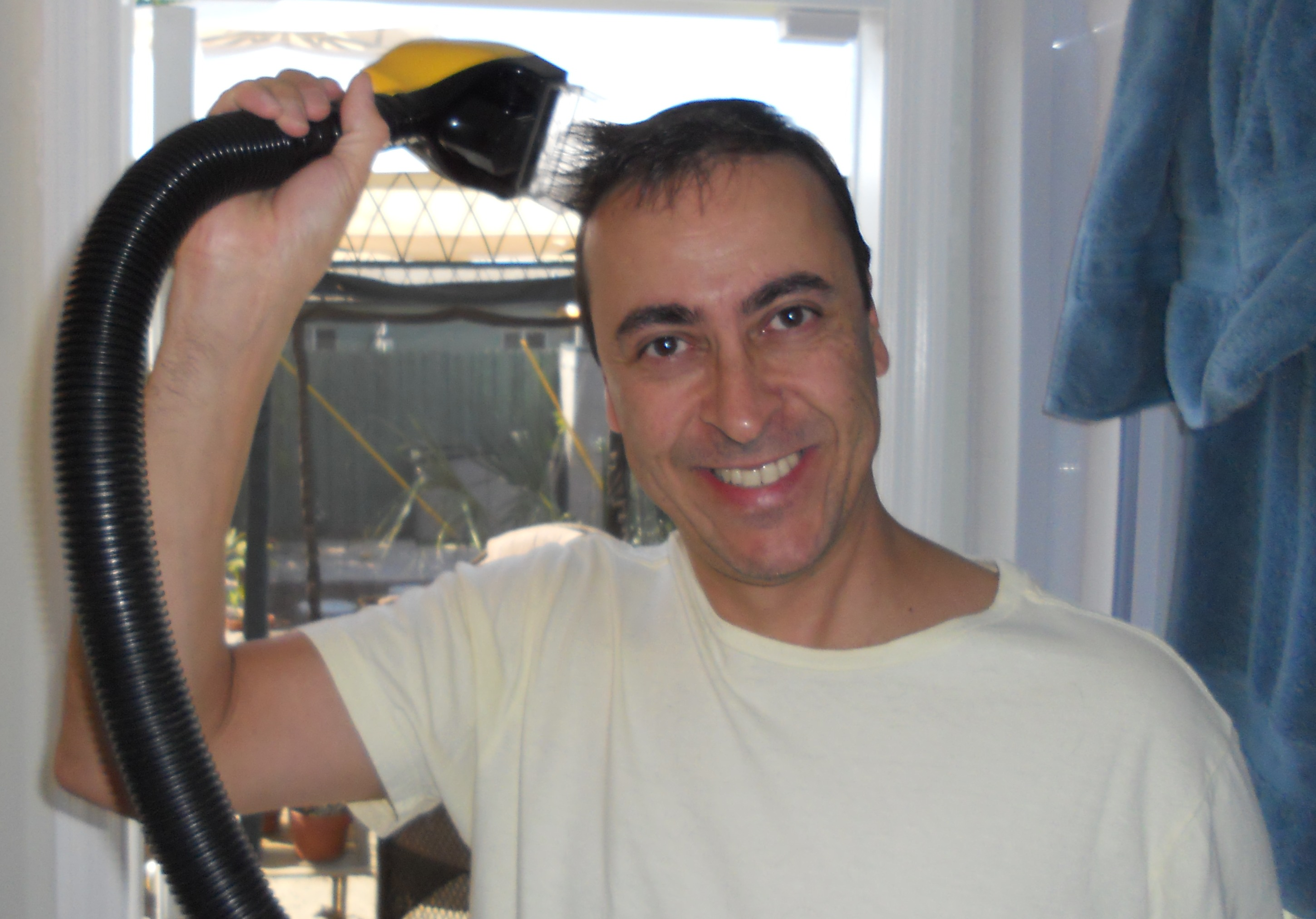
A man uses a Flowbee, an electrically powered vacuum cleaner attachment made for cutting hair.

The Flowbee is an electrically powered vacuum cleaner attachment made for cutting hair. It was developed and filed for patent in 1986 by Rick E. Hunts, a San Diego, California, US carpenter. US patent 4679322 was granted in 1987 and the product marketed since 1988. Hunts initially sold the Flowbees out of his garage before finding success with live demonstrations at a county fair. The product was advertised as being capable of performing "hundreds of precision layered haircuts" in frequently aired late-night television infomercials. By 2000, two million Flowbees had been sold.

Hair cutting devices like the Flowbee are used by astronauts during spaceflight missions, including on the ISS, because hair particles are sucked into a container instead of floating freely inside the spacecraft in the absence of gravity.

The standard Flowbee can be used to groom dogs with long hair such as Maltese or Bichon Frisé with a special pet-grooming attachment; a Flowbee Pet Groomer variant of the device was available previously.

Over the years, the Flowbee device saw at least three revisions which can be identified by the shape and labeling of the cutting head ("Vac-u-cut", "Flowbee Int.", "Flowbee.com"). It continues in production, and is sold through the Flowbee factory direct website and various Internet sellers. The Flowbee factory was located in Flour Bluff, a suburb of Corpus Christi, Texas but later moved to Kerrville, Texas.

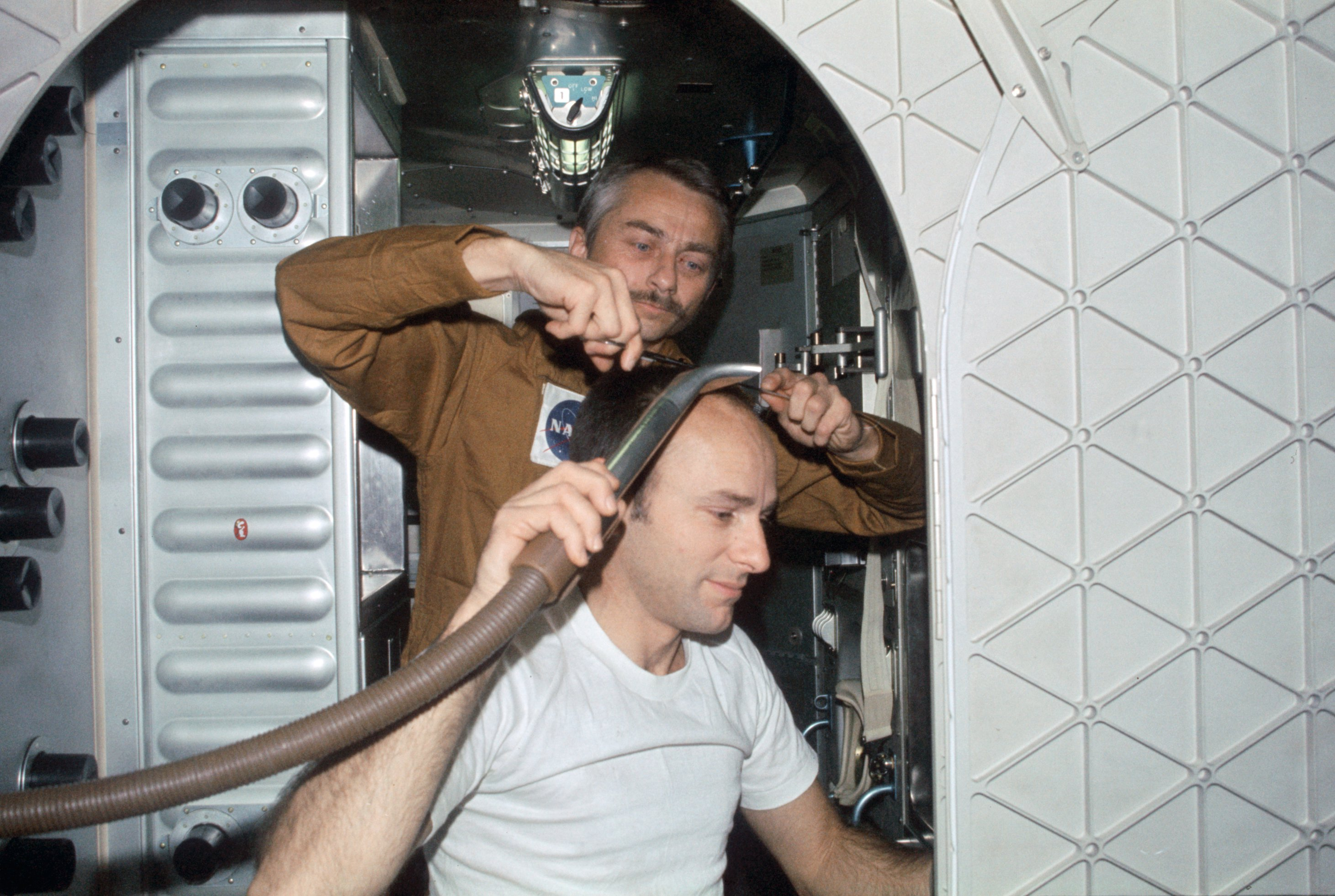
Astronauts aboard the Skylab space station cutting hair with scissors plus a vacuum cleaner to prevent hair particles from accumulating in the microgravity environment.

== Operation ==
The device consists of an electric-powered cutting head, spacers, and a hose. The hose is attached to the suction hose of a vacuum cleaner or a dedicated Flowbee "Mini Vac". One or more of several spacers is fitted onto the cutting head depending on the length of hair desired. The vacuum is turned on, the cutting head powered up, and the cutting head placed over the head. The vacuum sucks the hair through the spacers and into the cutting head, cutting off the ends of the hair. The suction carries the cut hair particles into the vacuum. The cutting head is lifted and placed over another section of hair, continuing around the head until all the hair is cut. Different spacers may be used to cut varying lengths, such as shorter hair at the nape of the neck and longer hair on the top of the head.

== Opinions ==
The Flowbee was tested on The Fourth Hour, hosted by Pat Gray and Stu Burguiere on GBTV, during the Infomercial Friday segment which aired on June 22, 2012. It was given poor reviews by both hosts despite initial optimism by Burguiere. Gray quipped that "the problem seems to be that [the Flowbee] doesn't actually cut hair".

== In popular culture ==
Reference to the Flowbee has been made in many films and television shows.

It was spoofed in the film Wayne's World as a device called the "Suck Kut".

Reference to the Flowbee was made in the American comedy series Glee. In Season 1, Episode 15 "The Power of Madonna" glee club director, Mr. Schuester told Sue Sylvester, "Oh, maybe you should try a new setting on your Flowbee, oh snap".

The band Bloodhound Gang made reference to the device in their song "Mope" from their third album Hooray for Boobies with the lyric "Givin' myself a mullet / Hook the Flowbee to the Kirby."

In The Spy Next Door, the children find a Flowbee in the spy character's drawer.

In an episode of The Nanny, CC comments on the fact that Niles is so stingy with his money that he "bought a Flowbee just so you could do your own hair!".

In an episode of Legends of Tomorrow, the Flowbee was featured as an exhibition in the Hall of Bad Ideas, later to be looted and used as a weapon by the protagonists.

In 2020 actor George Clooney said that he used a Flowbee to cut his own hair, and had done so for over 22 years.

The character of Emmett Marlowe uses one in a chapter titled after the device in the Philip Marlowe novel "The Goodbye Coast" by author Joe Ide.
