= My Brother, My Brother and Me =

Comedy advice podcast

- The official cover art for My Brother, My Brother and Me, featuring (left to right) Justin, Travis, and Griffin
- Genre: Comedy and humor; Advice
- Language: English

Cast and voices
- Hosted by: Justin, Travis & Griffin McElroy

Music
- Opening theme: "Take a Chance on Me" by ABBA (episodes 1–37) "(It's A) Departure" by The Long Winters (38–541) "Rugrats Theme" by Mark Mothersbaugh; new lyrics by Griffin McElroy (542–551) "My Life (Is Better with You!)" by Montaigne (552–present)
- Ending theme: "Root to This" by Fear of Pop (episodes 1–28) "Play Your Part (Pt. 2)" by Girl Talk (29–124) thereafter the same as opening theme

Production
- Length: approx. 60 minutes

Technical specifications
- Audio format: MP3

Publication
- No. of episodes: 826
- Original release: April 12, 2010
- Provider: Maximum Fun (episodes 38–present)
- Updates: Weekly

Related
- Related shows: The Adventure Zone; Can I Pet Your Dog?; The Joystiq Podcast; Sawbones; Shmanners; 'Til Death Do Us Blart
- Website: maximumfun.org/shows/my-brother-my-brother-and-me/

My Brother, My Brother and Me (often abbreviated as MBMBaM, pronounced /məˈbɪmbæm/) is a weekly comedy advice podcast distributed by the Maximum Fun network and hosted by brothers Justin, Travis, and Griffin McElroy. Regular episodes of the podcast feature the brothers comedically providing answers to questions either submitted by listeners or found online.

The show was independently produced and released by the McElroy brothers from April 2010 until joining the Maximum Fun network of podcasts in January 2011. In 2010, the show was consistently listed among the top 10 comedy podcasts on iTunes. Writing for The A.V. Club, critics David Anthony and Colin Griffith both counted MBMBaM as one of their top 10 podcasts of 2012. A TV series based on the podcast premiered on Seeso in February 2017 and was hosted on VRV until the service got absorbed into Crunchyroll.

== History ==
=== Origins and self-publishing ===
Justin McElroy was previously a host for The Joystiq Podcast, a video game talk show which launched as part of the website Joystiq in 2007. His brother Griffin was also a journalist for the site and would regularly appear on the show as a guest host, usually to fill in for an absent member of the cast. Various McElroy family members appeared as guests over the show's run, including their father Clint McElroy. (Note: Chris Grant, Ludwig Kietzmann, Justin McElroy (July 10, 2009). "100 Century Edition". The Joystiq Podcast (Podcast). Event occurs at 01:47:00.) The podcast also regularly collaborated with voice actor Bob Ball, who would read listener emails. (Note: Chris Grant, Ludwig Kietzmann, Justin McElroy (October 29, 2010). "156 Terrifically Spooky Edition 3". The Joystiq Podcast (Podcast). Event occurs at 46:40.)

In April 2010, the brothers- along with middle brother Travis McElroy- launched My Brother, My Brother and Me as an independent advice podcast. The show quickly gained popularity due to the family's established audience from Joystiq; Justin advertised MBMBaM at the end of each episode. The family also encouraged their Joystiq fans to hold listening parties with new people- and if there were at least four people to be present at an event, they would record a 30 second greeting clip to be played at the party. Justin acknowledged that the broader conversational scope of MBMBaM gave Joystiq listeners opportunity to introduce friends who were not interested in video games to the show.

For the first 37 episodes, the show's theme song was "Take a Chance on Me" by ABBA. "Root to This" by Fear of Pop was used as a closing theme until episode 28, and later "Play Your Part (Pt. 2)" by Girl Talk. Beginning with episode 18, the show opened with a disclaimer read by Ball.

=== Maximum Fun ===
The show became part of the Maximum Fun network in January 2011, and thereafter changed opening theme- wanting to avoid a potential lawsuit over the lack of permission for "Take a Chance on Me". The show adopted "(It's a) Departure" by John Roderick & The Long Winters (from the album Putting the Days to Bed) from their debut on Maximum Fun with episode 38 in January 17, 2011."

A special episode was released in 2014 to cover Justin McElroy's paternity leave. Entitled The Adventure Zone, the episode saw the three brothers, plus their father Clint McElroy, play Dungeons & Dragons. This became the basis for companion podcast The Adventure Zone which launched later that year.

In 2017, Seeso produced a television adaptation of the podcast, which was filmed in their home town of Huntington, West Virginia. The six episode series was only briefly available on Seeso as the network shut down that November, only months after the show's launch.

Due to Roderick's conduct surrounding the controversy over the musician's Twitter posting history, the show's official Twitter account announced that "(It's a) Departure" would no longer be used by the podcast as of January 3, 2021. From episodes 542 to 551, the show used the theme song from Rugrats, featuring lyrics sung by Griffin, as a placeholder for both the opening and ending theme. This was replaced in episode 552 with "My Life Is Better with You", which was written and performed by Australian artist Montaigne for the show. Bob Ball re-recorded the opening disclaimer for the show as the original master had been lost.

On May 4, 2021, the Yahoo! Answers service was shut down. This part of the show was replaced with content from other knowledge-exchange websites such as Quora and wikiHow, in a segment later named "Wizard of the Cloud" or "Wisdom of the Cloud." The "Final Yahoo" at the end of each episode has been replaced with a variety of different sign-offs.

In June 2021, the podcast took part in a crossover with Welcome to Night Vale. The Night Vale setting features an in-fiction version of MBMBaM entitled My Brother, Your Brother and a Cursed Amulet. In episode 190, a segment of this podcast is included, in which Justin and Travis answer a question from Steve Carlsberg. The skit is continued in a post-credits segment.

== Format ==
MBMBAM takes the format of an advice show, where the McElroy brothers answer questions with a combination of silly and practical suggestions in the form of a rapid-fire comedy discussion. Early episodes used questions from various online sources, primarily Yahoo! Answers, as the podcast did not yet have an established audience to rely on for content. As the show gained popularity, the McElroy brothers were able to alternate between questions from listeners and questions from the Yahoo! Answers service. Each episode ended with Griffin reading a "Final Yahoo," which was left unanswered; this was retired after Yahoo Answers shut down.

=== Recurring segments ===
In addition to the usual format of responding to questions sent in by listeners, the podcast also frequently includes recurring segments. Most live shows include at least one of these segments, such as Munch Squad or Haunted Doll Watch. Segments include:

- "The Money Zone": A segment which occurs each episode, normally around the midpoint, including advertisements from corporate sponsors read by the hosts on air. Additionally, they would read paid messages from listeners, called "Jumbotrons," before discontinuing them for both MBMBaM and their Dungeons & Dragons podcast, "The Adventure Zone," in episode 436.
- "Minion Quotes": A segment wherein one brother reads quotes which he finds in image macros on Facebook. The other two brothers attempt to guess which cartoon character is featured along with the quote. If they guess correctly, The challenging brother must post the image on his Facebook page without context, and cannot reply to the responses to the post. This has caused no small amount of distress to each of them. The segment was originally Justin's, with Griffin and Travis guessing, but they have since begun rotating which brother brings quotes and which attempt to guess.
- "Munch Squad": A "podcast within a podcast" in which Justin reads press releases from fast food companies. The segment is typically introduced by Justin interrupting the podcast after a Money Zone segment, singing a parody of the chorus of the Twisted Sister song, "I Wanna Rock". During 2019 the segment was largely focused on the chicken sandwich wars.
- "Haunted Doll Watch": A segment which features Justin reading and critiquing eBay listings of apparently cursed, possessed, or haunted dolls.
- "Sad Libs": A segment in which Travis creates tragic stories with blank spaces and completes them with nonsensical or uncomfortable words, resembling Mad Libs. Performed largely at live shows, the segment is ridiculed and despised by Justin and Griffin.
- "That's a Christmas to Me": A segment in which Justin reads plot summaries of three Christmas movies, two of which are real and one of which is fake. Griffin and Travis must guess which description is fake.
- "Riddle Me Piss": A segment in which Travis reads confusing and often nonsensical "riddles" from Riddles.com. While introducing the segment and reading the riddle, Travis will often adopt an exaggerated, high-pitched voice. Justin and Griffin tend to try to apply logic to otherwise illogical riddles, leaving both brothers exasperated and upset.
- "Celebrity Wines, Why Not?": A game show-style segment in which Justin provides the name of a wine made by a celebrity, and Travis and Griffin attempt to guess the celebrity that makes the wine. The segment is typically introduced via singing.
- "Reach for the Stars": A segment in which Travis reads Amazon reviews, along with their respective rating. Justin and Griffin's roles are to guess what products the reviews are for.
- "Play Along At Home": A game show-style segment in which Travis asks Justin and Griffin trivia questions, while inviting the audience to "play along at home," in the style of a children’s television host. The questions cover a wide range of topics, but often end with an anecdotal question that Justin and Griffin would have no way of knowing. Travis started this segment shortly after having his second baby, and his brothers make it clear how much they dislike it.
- "Under the Table and Phishing": A game show-style segment in which Travis reads lyrics from either Phish or Dave Matthews Band. Griffin and Justin then attempt to guess which band the lyrics are from. Travis, doing an impersonation of Dave Matthews, makes "guest appearances" as the co-host of this segment.
- "Work of Fart": A game show-style segment with a format similar to that of Jeopardy. Travis provides Justin and Griffin with a statement that combines a description of a classic piece of film, literature or other work of art, with a reference to bathroom humour. Justin and Griffin then try to guess what pun Travis created to mashup the title of the work in question with the bathroom humor word.
- "Wizard/Wisdom of the Cloud": A segment intended to replace Yahoo Answers following the website's shutdown in May 2021. Within, Griffin presents a wikiHow article which gives questionable advice on obscure topics. Examples include "How to Mosh in a Mosh Pit", "How to Choose a Nickname For Your Car", and "How to Make It Look Like You Have Snow Powers".

=== Special episodes ===
Episodes of the show are occasionally performed and recorded in front of live audiences at venues in cities such as Los Angeles, New York City and Huntington; the format remains the same, including recurring segments such as Munch Squad, with the addition of a section where the brothers take questions from the audience. Occasionally there will be episodes titled "Bro's Better, Bro's Best", which act as highlight reels of the best and funniest moments of previous episodes. A special episode called "The Adventure Zone" was released on August 18, 2014, shortly after Justin and his wife Sydnee had their first baby. It featured the brothers playing a game of Dungeons & Dragons with their father, Clint McElroy. The Adventure Zone was later spun off into its own podcast on the Maximum Fun network.

== Naming of the year ==
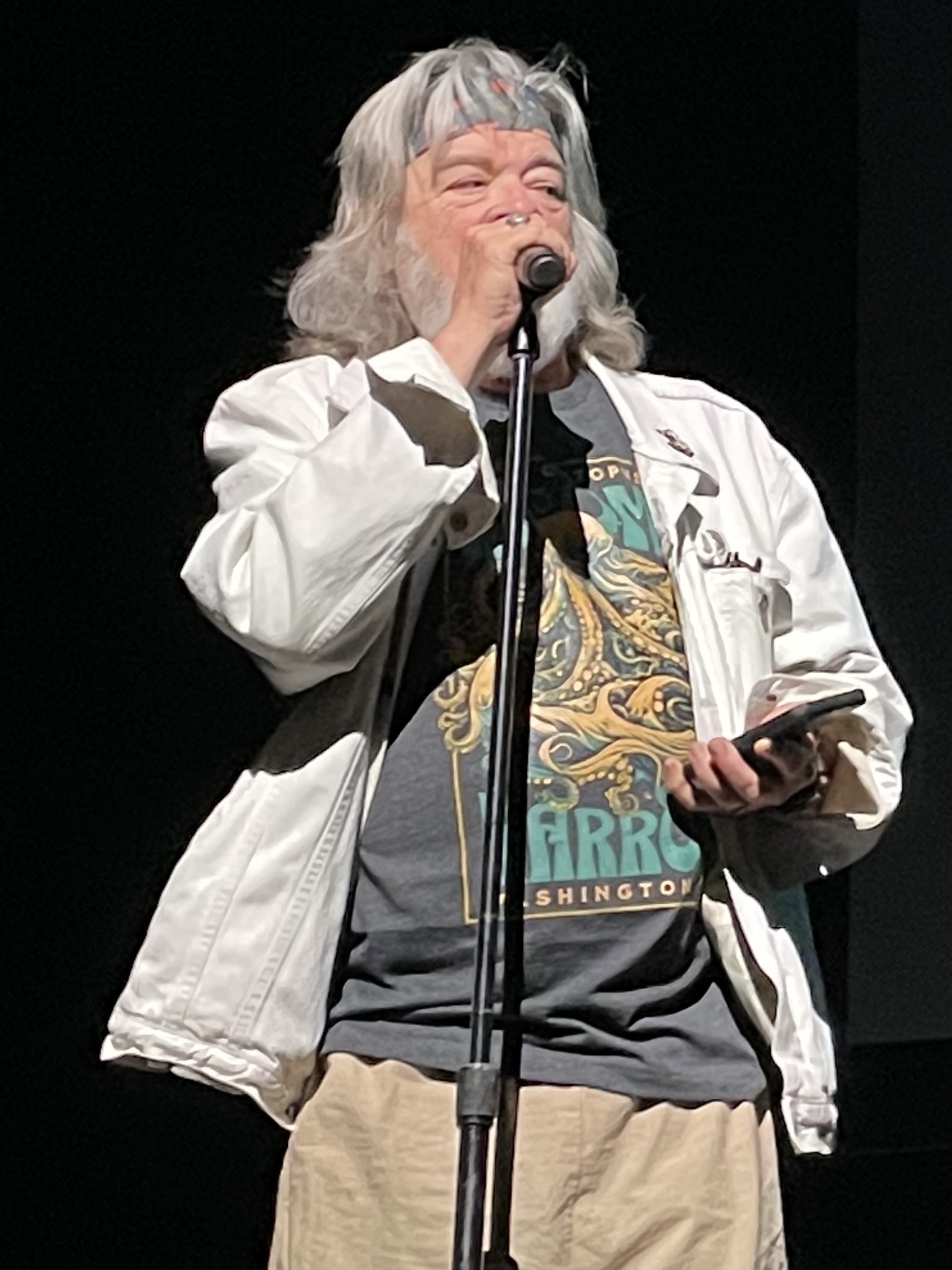
Clint McElroy introduces a live performance during the Twenty Thunder Drive Tour, Tacoma, 2025

Since the show's inception, the hosts have established nicknames for each year. These are generally work-shopped live in an episode of the podcast each January. Along with setting the tone, these serve as theming for merchandise and the family's live tours for the year. On occasion, a name has been revised mid-way due to poor reception.

Year	Name
2010	"ZOLO"
2011	Two-Thousand-and-Heaven: Get Right with Christ
2012	Twenty-Doz: Gettin' It
2013	Twenty-Dirt: Dig It up Get It Out
2014	Twenty-Forward
2015	Twenty-Grift-Teen: The Con is On
2016	Twenty-Fix-Teen: Building Bridges
2017	Twenty-Serpentine: Keep 'em Guessing (Zag on 'em)
2018	Collaborate-Teen: Stronger Together
2019	Frankenstein-Teen: Become the Monster
2020	Twenty-Funny: Fill Your Life with Laughter and Love; Twenty-Hunny: Down to Beesness; Hunny-Funny: Fill Your Life With Laughter and Bees
2021	Big-Dog-Run: No Bones About It
2022	Twenty-Rendezvous: Fancy Takes Flight
2023	Twenty-Sun-and-Sea: Surf the Vibe
2024	Twenty-Fungalore: He Heard Your Wish
2025	Tummy-Buddy-Life: Dare to Care; Twenty-Thunder-Drive: Faster Than Fear
2026	20-Make-It-Stick: A Heater for the Big Boy

== Guests ==
The show occasionally features guest experts (referred to as "guestsperts") who help the McElroy brothers answer questions. Notable past guests include:

- Jimmy Buffett, musician
- Jessica Alyssa Cerro, aka Montaigne, musician, Eurovision contestant, singer/writer of current podcast theme “My Life Is Better With You”.
- Bill Corbett, television and theatre writer, producer and performer
- Laura Kate Dale, author and video game journalist
- Felicia Day, actress and writer
- Jesse Eisenberg, actor and writer
- Cameron Esposito, stand-up comedian and podcast host
- Elsie Fisher, actress
- Ron Funches, comedian, actor and writer
- Chris Gethard, actor, author, and talk show host
- Elizabeth Gilbert, author
- Hank Green, vlogger, podcaster, and author
- Marilu Henner, actress, producer, radio host, and author
- John Hodgman, actor, author, and podcast host
- Jake Hurwitz and Amir Blumenfeld, actors, comedians and podcast hosts
- Christian Jacobs, aka MC Bat Commander, musician, actor and producer
- Bridget Lancaster, producer and host of America's Test Kitchen
- Lin-Manuel Miranda, actor, award-winning composer, playwright, and rapper
- Randall Munroe, author and webcomic artist
- Griffin Newman, actor and comedian
- Ify Nwadiwe, actor, writer, and comedian
- Jonah Ray, actor, comedian, and podcast host
- John Roderick, musician and podcast host, singer/writer of former podcast theme "(It's A) Departure"
- Patrick Rothfuss, fantasy author
- Dan Savage, advice columnist, podcast host, and author

Episode 400 featured a number of celebrity guests, including Miranda, Buffett, Henner, Ethan Suplee, Corey Cott, Steve Kroft, Brenda Vaccaro, and Al Roker. That episode also featured Matt Doyle as part of a running joke about Justin's inability to recognize the actor, which was resurrected when he appeared onstage at the beginning of a live show in Brooklyn in 2019.

== TV show ==
A television series based on the podcast was ordered for NBC's Seeso video streaming platform. Filming took place for three weeks during September 2016 in the McElroys' hometown of Huntington, West Virginia, with most of the episodes featuring scenes with their father Clint McElroy and mayor Stephen T. Williams. "(It's a) Departure" by John Roderick and the Long Winters was retained as the theme song for the television series. The show ran for six episodes, all of which were released via Seeso on February 23, 2017.

In June 2017, the series was sold to Otter Media for its streaming service VRV, alongside other former Seeso programs including HarmonQuest.

The metal sign with the show's logo used in the primary set was auctioned off for charity in July 2020.

No.	Title	Original release date
1	"Dorms & Ghoulsmashing"	February 23, 2017
A viewer asks for help living with several supposedly-haunted items owned by their roommate, leading the McElroys to call on a pair of paranormal investigators and recreate the scenario by filling a dorm room with as many scary objects as possible, including a haunted clown doll purchased by Justin. Guest Stars: Jonathan Scott and Drew Scott of Property Brothers
2	"Resumes & Jamiroquai's Dad"	February 23, 2017
To help a viewer looking to improve his résumé, the McElroys take on as many jobs in a short period as possible, including a minute-long honorary mayorship and a brief period in charge of Safety Town. To prove their methods, Griffin tries to reapply for a job he was dismissed from in his youth, with his brothers also applying for the same position.
3	"Tarantulas & Travis Did a Hit"	February 23, 2017
When a viewer asks the McElroys to convince his wife to let him have a pet tarantula, Travis must confront his arachnophobia as the brothers attempt to improve the reputation of tarantulas via a rebranding, an improved social media presence, and a pro-spider parade.
4	"Teens & Your Least Favorite Soda"	February 23, 2017
To help a teacher better determine how to maintain her students' interests in class, the McElroys attempt to understand teenagers better by giving themselves "teen names" and practicing trends like dabbing and water bottle flipping. Aided by Justin's teenage sister-in-law Rileigh and her classmates, each brother attempts a different teaching style to connect with the teens. Guest Stars: John Green and Hank Green of Vlogbrothers.
5	"Secret Societies & Apologies to Nathan"	February 23, 2017
A viewer asks how to become a member of a secret society, so the McElroys begin an investigation in the hopes of discovering a hidden organization that holds all the power in Huntington. When their search goes cold, the brothers eventually decide to start their own secret society, "The Knights Templar 2: Wacky Wizards".
6	"Candlenights & Vape Ape"	February 23, 2017
An attempt to help a viewer with their vaping problem is suddenly interrupted by the unexpected arrival of Candlenights. After telling the story of the holiday's origins, the McElroy brothers must band together to organize and prepare for a Candlenights live show in just three days. Guest Stars: Lin-Manuel Miranda and "Weird Al" Yankovic.

== Philanthropy ==
Over its history, the show has engaged its fans to support charities in the hosts' hometown of Huntington, West Virginia. In 2014, the show spawned a campaign among fans called MBMBaM Angels, in which fans of the show would buy requested items from the "Empty Stockings" list published by Huntington's Herald-Dispatch. In 2020, the campaign raised over $23,000.

In 2020, the brothers sold a sign from their television show online, raising $3,200 for the local Habitat for Humanity branch.

The brothers also host an extravaganza every year for "Candlenights," a fictional holiday, which is also a major fundraiser. Past shows have supported Recovery Point, a local recovery center for those recovering from addiction, and Big Brothers Big Sisters of South Central West Virginia. The 2019 show at the Keith-Albee Theatre in Huntington raised $46,000 for Harmony House (Huntington), a local organization helping the homeless in Cabell County, West Virginia. The show was originally performed live in Huntington, but due to the COVID-19 pandemic, the 2020 Candlenights show was moved from in-person to an online on-demand event, and all subsequent shows have remained online. While the executive director of Harmony House expected the online show to raise half of the 2019 total, the show raised over $200,000 for the organization. Additionally, Justin McElroy's wife Sydnee and his mother-in-law directly volunteer with the organization.

== Awards ==
My Brother, My Brother and Me won the 2026 iHeartPodcast award for Best Ad Read.
