= Sawbones (podcast) =

Medical history and comedy podcast

- Genre: Medical, comedy
- Language: English

Cast and voices
- Hosted by: Sydnee & Justin McElroy

Music
- Opening theme: "Medicines" by The Taxpayers
- Ending theme: "Medicines" by The Taxpayers

Production
- Length: c. 40 min.

Publication
- No. of episodes: 582
- Original release: June 21, 2013
- Provider: Maximum Fun
- Updates: Weekly

Sawbones: A Marital Tour of Misguided Medicine is a weekly, comedic medical podcast hosted by Dr. Sydnee McElroy and her husband, podcaster Justin McElroy. The show is distributed online by Maximum Fun.

In each episode, Sydnee discusses an element of historical medical practice, while Justin provides a comedic foil. The show normally focuses on antiquated medical practices that are unusual to modern listeners but occasionally covers rare and unusual disorders and occurrences.

== History ==
=== Background and formation ===
Justin McElroy began podcasting in 2007 as co-host of the video game talk show The Joystiq Podcast. In episode 115 Sydnee briefly appeared as a guest alongside Justin to answer questions about the 2009 swine flu pandemic. Sydnee and Justin McElroy had also previously worked together on a short podcast series entitled Losing the Sheen, focused on watching Two and a Half Men. The show only lasted nine episodes before the two became tired of it, instead starting a medical podcast based on Sydnee's expertise. While developing the idea for the show, the McElroys decided that it would be irresponsible for them to give medical advice to listeners, even with Sydnee's background. They opted instead to focus on the historical aspects, which had been an interest of Sydnee's. Like other shows by the family, such as My Brother, My Brother and Me, Sawbones is distributed via the Maximum Fun network.

Sawbones has aired over 500 episodes with content on "medical history to uncover all the odd, weird, wrong, dumb and just gross ways we've tried to fix people over the years."

=== The Horrifying, Hilarious Road To Modern Medicine ===
In June 2018, a book adaptation of the podcast was announced, under the title The Sawbones Book: The Horrifying, Hilarious Road To Modern Medicine. Published by Weldon Owen, the book became available in October 2018. The book showed up in the top 10 Audible bestsellers for the week ending April 5, 2019. The book was on the New York Times best sellers list in the science category for three weeks. The book was illustrated by Sydnee's sibling, Teylor Smirl.

== See also ==
- List of history podcasts
- List of health and wellness podcasts
