= Ironton Tribune =

Newspaper in Ironton, Ohio

- Type: Daily newspaper
- Owner: Carpenter Media Group
- Staff writers: Mark Shaffer
- Community editor: Heath Harrison
- Founded: 1928
- Language: English
- Headquarters: 2903 S. Fifth Street; Ironton, Ohio; United States
- Sister newspapers: Tri-State Living
- ISSN: 0279-5124
- Website: Official website

The Ironton Tribune is a daily newspaper based in Ironton, Ohio. The newspaper is owned by the Carpenter Media Group.

== History ==
The Tribune originated in 1928 as a merger of existing publications The Irontonian and The Ironton Register. The Register had been in circulation since 1850, while The Irontonian entered circulation in 1874. Originally based at Railroad Street in downtown Ironton, the Tribune relocated to Fifth Street in 1974 and then moving back to downtown Ironton at 211 Center Street in 2021.

Podcaster, comedian, and video game journalist Justin McElroy worked as a reporter for the Ironton Tribune from 2005, later being promoted to news editor before entering the video game journalism industry with Joystiq in 2007.
