= Griffin McElroy =

American podcaster, writer and comedian (born 1987)

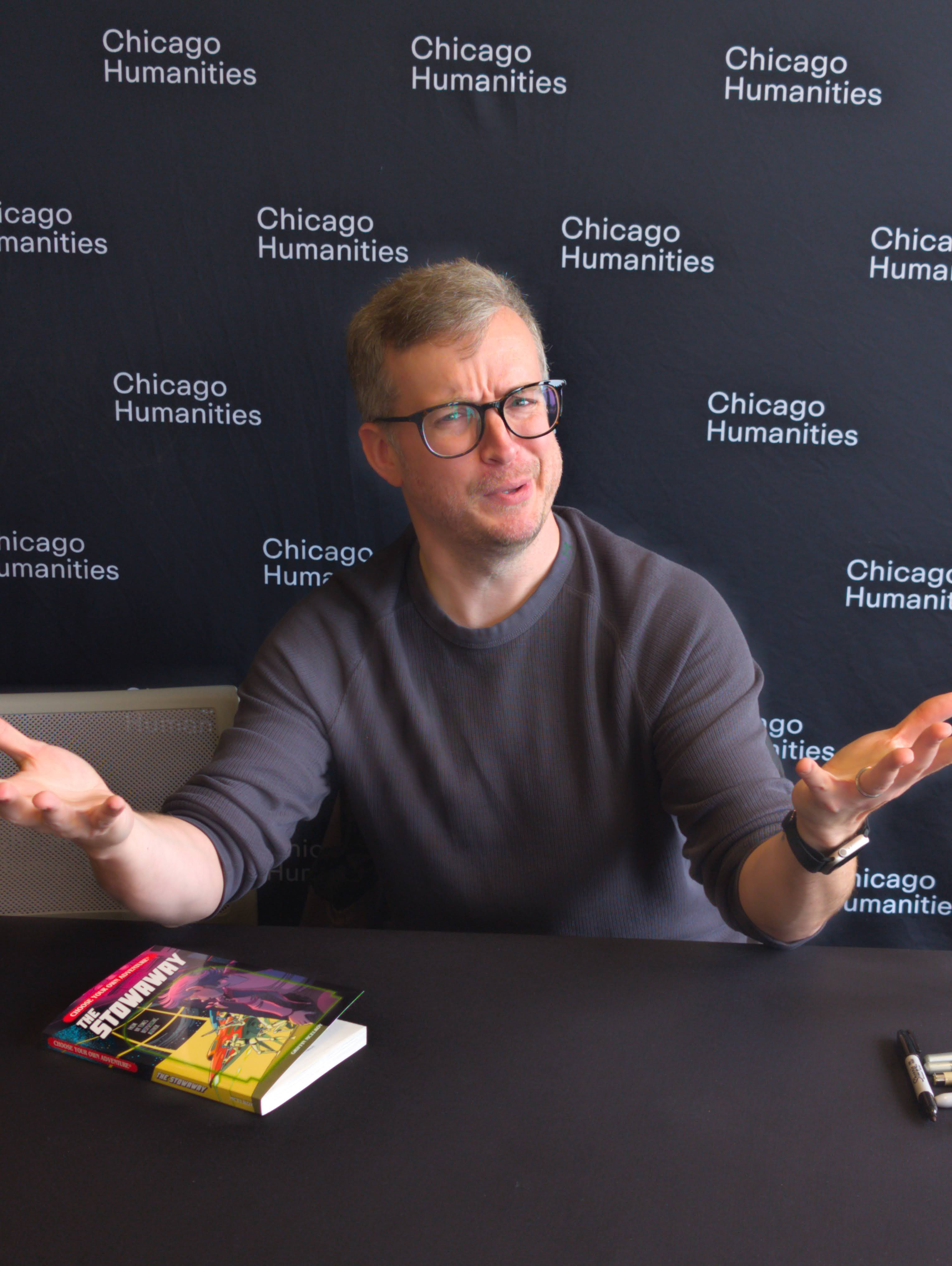
- Griffin McElroy at Chicago Humanities Festival 2026
- Born: April 17, 1987 (age 39); Huntington, West Virginia, U.S.
- Education: Huntington High School; Marshall University
- Occupations: Podcaster, journalist, actor
- Years active: 2007–present
- Known for: Co-founder of Polygon
- Notable work: My Brother, My Brother and Me; The Adventure Zone; Wonderful!
- Spouse: Rachel McElroy (m. 2013)
- Children: 2
- Father: Clint McElroy
- Relatives: Travis McElroy (brother); Justin McElroy (brother); Sydnee McElroy (sister-in-law)

Griffin Andrew McElroy (/ˈmæk.əlˌrɔɪ/ MACK-əl-roy, born April 17, 1987) is an American podcaster, actor, writer, composer, and former video game journalist. He is known for his work on podcasts such as My Brother, My Brother and Me and The Adventure Zone, as well as for co-founding the video game journalism website Polygon.

== Early and personal life ==
McElroy was born in 1987 to Clint McElroy, former co-host of WTCR-FM's morning radio show in Huntington, West Virginia, and his wife Leslie. Griffin McElroy is an alumnus of Marshall University with a degree in journalism. He used to live in Chicago and Austin, Texas. He married Rachel McElroy in 2013. They have two sons. He currently lives in Washington, D.C.

== Career ==
=== Journalism ===
McElroy's journalism career began in 2007 when he started working as the weekend editor for Joystiq. During the 2008 United States presidential election, McElroy also acted as MTV's local journalist for his home state of West Virginia. He departed Joystiq in 2012 in order to found Polygon along with his brother Justin McElroy and Christopher Grant, going on to later become a senior video producer for the site. During his tenure, he oversaw a large volume of video content for the site, including their Monster Factory series and several let's plays. In 2018, Griffin and Justin both announced their departure from Polygon, in order to focus on their podcasting careers and families.

=== Podcasting ===
While working at Joystiq, Griffin would occasionally appear as a guest host on The Joystiq Podcast, alongside his brother Justin. His first appearance was in episode 40, released on March 7, 2008. Since 2010, Griffin, Justin and their brother Travis, have co-hosted the comedy podcast My Brother, My Brother and Me, an "advice show for the modren [sic] era" hosted as part of the Maximum Fun network. The brothers also starred in a 2017 TV show based on the podcast, which originally aired on Seeso.

In 2014, the McElroy brothers launched a tabletop role-playing game podcast entitled The Adventure Zone. Initially playing Dungeons & Dragons, the show moved into other game systems in later seasons. Griffin McElroy acted as the Dungeon Master and voice of numerous NPCs for the initial 69 episodes of their first campaign, Balance' He later took on the similar role of "Keeper" for the Monster of the Week Powered by the Apocalypse based Amnesty campaign. In the show's third campaign, Graduation, he played the role of Sir Fitzroy Maplecourt, Knight-in-Absentia of the Realm of Goodcastle. McElroy reprised his role as DM for Ethersea, the fourth campaign of the show, which concluded in July 2022. He plays Montrose Pretty in the fifth campaign, Steeplechase. He also composes much of the original soundtrack for the series.

The first story arc of The Adventure Zone: Balance, named Here There Be Gerblins, was later adapted into a graphic novel in cooperation with artist Carey Pietsch, and was published by First Second Books in 2018. The book topped The New York Times' best-selling trade fiction list, becoming the first graphic novel to do so. It was followed by additional graphic novel adaptations of the subsequent The Adventure Zone: Balance story arcs: Murder on the Rockport Limited! in 2019; Petals to the Metal in 2020; and The Crystal Kingdom in 2021. Two additional story arcs of the graphic novel adaptation The Adventure Zone: Balance were later released: The Eleventh Hour in 2023 and The Suffering Game in 2024. The last two story arcs The Stolen Century and Story and Song were adapted into a final graphic novel titled Story and Song in 2026, completing the adaptation of the Balance campaign.

Griffin and his brothers also co-host a yearly podcast with Tim Batt and Guy Montgomery, released every American Thanksgiving since 2015, called 'Til Death Do Us Blart where they watch and review the film Paul Blart: Mall Cop 2 each episode. The podcast released a bonus episode on April 28, 2020, where they instead watched the original Paul Blart: Mall Cop. The brothers also host the documentary podcast The McElroy Brothers Will Be in Trolls World Tour, which ultimately resulted in the announcement that all three were set to make cameo appearances in the film.

Since 2017, Griffin has co-hosted the podcast Wonderful! with his wife, Rachel, where they discuss things they are interested in and enjoy. The two had previously hosted another podcast named Rose Buddies, in which they recapped episodes of The Bachelor and related television series.

Griffin has appeared twice as a guest on The George Lucas Talk Show, once during the May the 4th, 2020 fundraiser The George Lucas Talk Show All Day Star Wars Movie Watch Along, and later on December 22, 2020, episode The George Lucas Holiday Special.

=== Voice acting ===
McElroy has appeared as a voice actor in several animated series, including Clarence, Big City Greens, We Bare Bears, and Camp Camp. He also provided voice commentary for the 2017 video game 100ft Robot Golf, alongside his brothers. In September 2018, following a podcasting campaign, the McElroy brothers, Travis, and Justin, confirmed that they would be voicing the character Skyscraper in the film Trolls World Tour, with Griffin also voicing Country Tear. In April 2021, McElroy was announced to be voicing a role in The Mitchells vs. the Machines and is listed in the credits as Additional Voices.

== Awards and achievements ==
In 2017, Forbes named McElroy in its "30 Under 30" list in media. This became a running gag during the introduction of My Brother, My Brother And Me for several years.

In 2021, a newly discovered species of millipede was named Nannaria mcelroyorum in recognition of the McElroy family's podcasts, which entertained the scientists during their fieldwork. The millipede is found in West Virginia as well as the wider Appalachian region.
