= Justin McElroy =

American podcaster, writer, and comedian (born 1980)

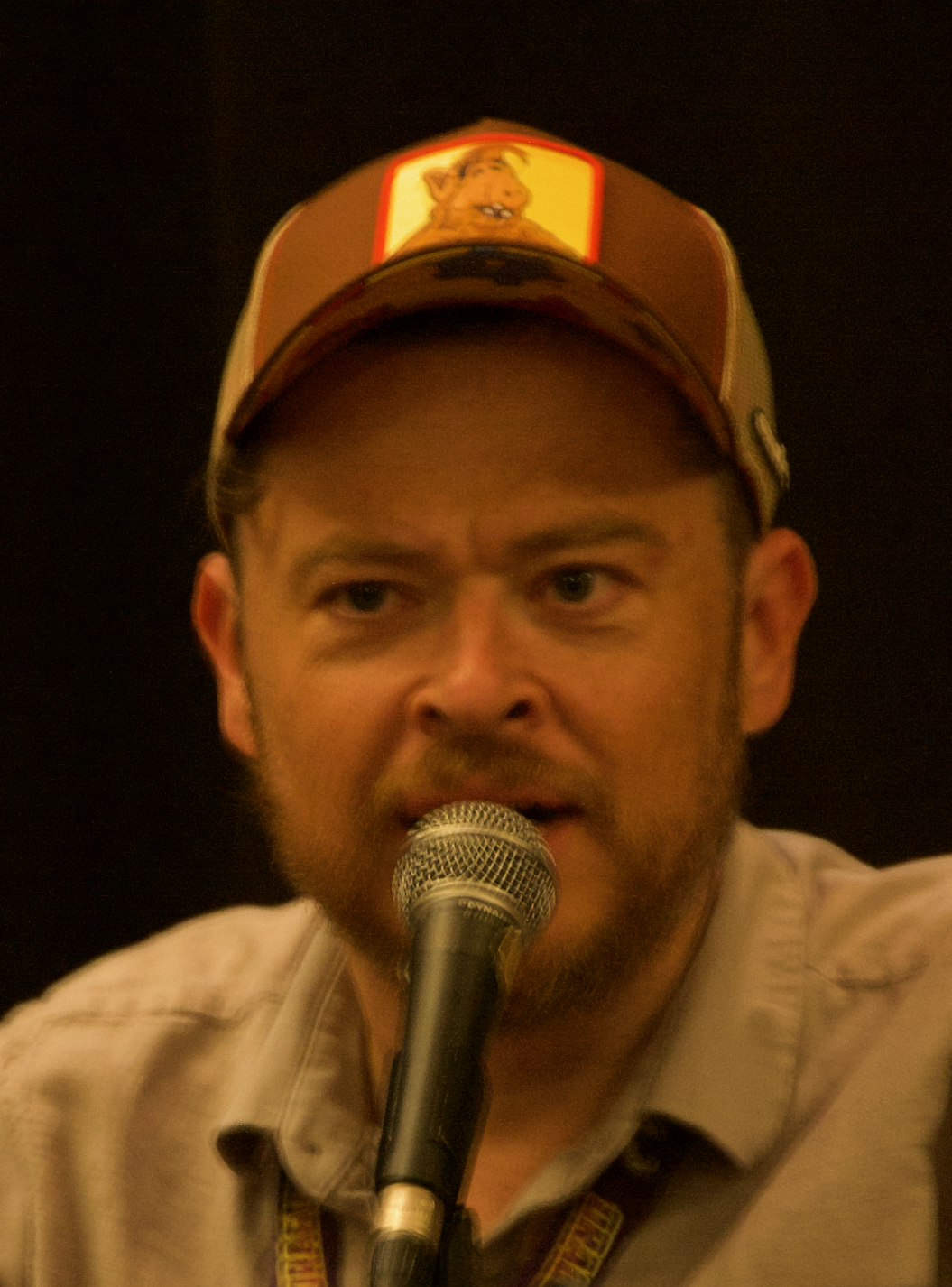
- McElroy in 2025
- Born: Justin Tyler McElroy; November 8, 1980 (age 46); Huntington, West Virginia, U.S.
- Education: Marshall University
- Occupations: Writer, actor, podcaster, journalist, honorary mayor of Huntington, West Virginia
- Years active: 2005–present
- Known for: Co-founder of Polygon
- Notable work: My Brother, My Brother and Me; The Adventure Zone; Sawbones; The Joystiq Podcast
- Spouse: Sydnee McElroy (m. 2006)
- Children: 2
- Father: Clint McElroy
- Relatives: Travis McElroy (brother); Griffin McElroy (brother)
- Awards: Shorty Award (Best in Video Games, 2008)
- Website: justinmcelroy.wordpress.com

Justin Tyler McElroy (/ˈmæk.əlˌrɔɪ/ MACK-əl-roy, born November 8, 1980) is an American podcaster, comedian, and former video game journalist. He is known for his work on podcasts (including My Brother, My Brother and Me, The Adventure Zone, and Sawbones) and as the co-founder of video game journalism website Polygon.

== Early and personal life ==
McElroy was born in 1980 to Clint McElroy, former co-host of WTCR-FM's morning radio show in Huntington, West Virginia, and his wife Leslie. McElroy attended Marshall University, and lives in Huntington as of 2020. He has been married to Dr. Sydnee Smirl McElroy since 2006. They have two daughters.

== Career ==
=== Journalism ===
McElroy made some early forays into games journalism as a teenager in the 1990s. He stated that his first submission was for a local paper edited by a friend of his father, a review for a Sega Genesis game when he was 13. Several early articles of his for huntingdonnews.net such as his 2001 review for Shenmue are preserved by The Internet Archive. McElroy's professional career began with the Ironton Tribune in 2005, when he was hired as a reporter to cover the Ohio University Southern, Ironton and Coal Grove areas and feature stories. After becoming news editor for the paper he then worked at Joystiq as a journalist from 2007 to 2012, where he co-hosted video game talk show The Joystiq Podcast.

In 2012, McElroy co-founded Polygon, a video game website, along with his brother Griffin and Christopher Grant, and was formerly an editor-at-large there. In 2018, Justin and Griffin both announced their departure from Polygon, in order to focus on their podcasting careers and families.

Justin McElroy also hosted the video game podcast The Besties with his brother Griffin McElroy, Chris Plante, and Russ Frushtick. The podcast's tagline is 'Shouldn't the world's best friend pick the world's best games?'. It was hosted by Polygon in the mid-2010s, when all four hosts were employed by the site, but continued independently afterwards. The podcast usually consists of the hosts reviewing games from a relatively recent period of time. After they discuss the games they planned on discussing for the week they move on to reading user submitted comments and recommending games or other forms of media. There are sometimes special episodes of the show that divert from this typical format, such as the annual game of the year tournaments. Justin McElroy announced his departure from The Besties in episode 496, dated 1 May 2026. He cited his long running problems with carpal tunnel syndrome and acknowledged that it would be the end of his decades long career in video game journalism. The show continued, led by the three other hosts.

=== Podcasting ===
Since 2010, Justin McElroy has co-hosted the comedy podcast My Brother, My Brother and Me along with his brothers Griffin and Travis. The podcast began in 2010 as a form of "self-entertainment" before it was added to the Maximum Fun network. The podcast takes the form of a humorous "advice show", in which the brothers answer questions that have been directly submitted by listeners, as well as questions that listeners have found on Yahoo! Answers. In 2010, the show was consistently listed among the top 10 comedy podcasts on iTunes, and it has received positive critical reception. The podcast was later turned into a 2017 television show, which originally aired on Seeso and formerly streamed on VRV.

Since June 21, 2013, Justin and his wife Sydnee have co-hosted the podcast Sawbones, a "marital tour of misguided medicine" and a humorous exploration of medical history, focusing on the many ways the medical community has been wrong in the past. A book based on this podcast, The Sawbones Book: The Horrifying, Hilarious Road To Modern Medicine, was published by Weldon Owen on October 9, 2018.

In 2014, the McElroy brothers launched a tabletop role-playing game podcast entitled The Adventure Zone. Initially focusing on Dungeons & Dragons, the show began to explore other game systems in later seasons. During the first campaign, subtitled Balance, Justin McElroy portrays Taako, an elf wizard. In the second campaign, Amnesty, Justin portrays Wayne "Duck" Newton, a forest ranger. In the third campaign, Graduation, he portrayed an unnamed Firbolg student. Justin played a monk named Amber Gris in the fourth campaign, Ethersea. For the fifth campaign, Steeplechase, he took the role of Game Master. In the sixth campaign, Versus Dracula, he plays a barbarian named Lady Godwin. He plays Goliath Lorovith Dreamwanderer Gonjavon in TAZ Royale.

The first sub-arc of The Adventure Zone: Balance, named Here There Be Gerblins, was later adapted into a graphic novel in cooperation with artist Carey Pietsch, and was published by First Second Books in 2018. The book topped The New York Times' best-selling trade fiction list, becoming the first graphic novel to do so. It was followed by a second graphic novel, Murder on the Rockport Limited!, in 2019, a third installment, Petals to the Metal, in 2020, a fourth, The Crystal Kingdom, in 2021, a fifth, The Eleventh Hour, in 2023, and a sixth installment, The Suffering Game in 2024.

Justin and his brothers also co-host a yearly podcast with Tim Batt and Guy Montgomery, released every American Thanksgiving since 2015, called 'Til Death Do Us Blart, where they review the film Paul Blart: Mall Cop 2. The brothers also host the documentary podcast The McElroy Brothers Will Be in Trolls World Tour, which ultimately resulted in the announcement that all three were set to make cameo appearances in the film.

In 2018, Justin McElroy launched The Empty Bowl, a "meditative podcast about cereal" with Dan Goubert, writer of the Cerealously blog.

=== Other programs ===
Beginning in 2015, Justin and his brother Griffin began hosting a gaming comedy show for Polygon called Monster Factory. The series—in which the two use character creation tools from popular video and computer games to create hideous characters—was praised by The Mary Sue as one of the "funniest series on YouTube". The series briefly went on hiatus after the pair left Polygon, but resumed output in December 2018.

Justin appeared with his brothers on the July 24, 2017, episode of @midnight, during which host Chris Hardwick publicly acknowledged that @midnight was ending.

Justin has appeared twice as a guest on The George Lucas Talk Show, once during the May the 4th, 2020 fundraiser The George Lucas Talk Show All Day Star Wars Movie Watch Along, and later on the December 22, 2020, episode The George Lucas Holiday Special.

=== Voice acting ===
McElroy has appeared as a voice actor in several animated TV shows. In 2017, he appeared as Billiam Milliam in the Cartoon Network animated comedy series OK K.O.! Let's Be Heroes. In 2018, he appeared in the Cartoon Hangover-produced animated mini-series Slug Riot and reprised the role of Billiam Milliam in the video game OK K.O.! Let's Play Heroes. He also provided voice commentary for the 2017 video game 100ft Robot Golf, along with Griffin and Travis. In September 2018, following a successful podcasting campaign, Justin and his brothers confirmed that they would be voicing the character Skyscraper in the film Trolls World Tour, with Justin also voicing Techno Drop Button and Tumbleweed. He also lends a voice to the School of Visual Arts thesis film, "MIDAS".

== Awards and achievements ==
In 2006, McElroy received an award for the best business reporting in Ohio from the Associated Press in recognition of his work with the Ironton Tribune. In 2009, McElroy received a Shorty Award in the video games category.

In 2021, a newly discovered species of millipede was named Nannaria mcelroyorum in recognition of the McElroy family's podcasts, which entertained the scientists during their field work. The millipede is found in West Virginia as well as the wider Appalachian region.

In 2021, McElroy added the "Berries and Cream" sound from a 2007 Starburst commercial to the video-sharing app TikTok, which has since been used in 354.1K videos.
