= Sydnee McElroy =

American medical doctor and podcaster

- Education: Marshall University
- Occupations: Doctor, podcaster
- Years active: 2009–present
- Notable work: Sawbones
- Spouse: Justin McElroy (m. 2006)
- Children: 2
- Relatives: Griffin McElroy (brother-in-law); Travis McElroy (brother-in-law); Clint McElroy (father-in-law)
- Website: maximumfun.org/about/team/sydnee-mcelroy/

Sydnee McElroy (/ˈmæk.əlˌrɔɪ/ MACK-əl-roy) is an American family medicine physician, assistant professor in family medicine at the Marshall University School of Medicine, and podcast host of Sawbones and Still Buffering.

== Career ==
=== Education and medical practice ===
McElroy graduated from Marshall University in 2005 as a Yeager Scholar and from the Marshall University Joan C. Edwards School of Medicine in 2009. She completed her medical residency at the Marshall University School of Medicine. As a medical student she received the 2009 faculty award, which is "presented by the Marshall University School of Medicine Alumni Association to the most outstanding fourth-year medical student as selected by the faculty." She also received the Glasgow-Rubin Citation for Academic Achievement from the American Medical Women's Association, which is awarded to women graduating in the top ten percent of their medical school graduating class.

McElroy is board certified through the American Board of Family Medicine and is a member of the American Academy of Family Physicians and the Alpha Omega Alpha Honor Medical Society. She is an assistant professor at the Marshall School of Medicine and has served as the faculty advisor for the Marshall University Alpha Omega Alpha chapter. In 2013, she was inducted as an Associate to the Marshall Academy of Medical Educators and in 2016 was awarded the Marshall College of Science's award of distinction at the Marshall University Alumni Association's 79th Annual Alumni Awards Banquet.

=== Podcasting ===
Sydnee McElroy first appeared as a guest on The Joystiq Podcast in 2009 to answer questions about the swine flu pandemic. She would later become the co-host of two podcasts on the Maximum Fun Network, Sawbones: A Marital Tour of Misguided Medicine and Still Buffering. She co-hosts Sawbones with her husband, writer and podcaster Justin McElroy, and Still Buffering with her two siblings, Teylor Smirl and Rileigh Smirl. Sawbones has aired over 400 episodes with content on "medical history to uncover all the odd, weird, wrong, dumb and just gross ways we’ve tried to fix people over the years." Still Buffering has aired over 150 episodes with content to "help bridge the gap between the teenagers of yesterday and today."

=== Politics ===
On February 9, 2022, McElroy announced that she was running for District 26 in the 2022 West Virginia House of Delegates election. She won the Democratic primary in the district on May 11, 2022, and ran against the incumbent (Note: Rohrbach was originally elected to District 17, which is roughly congruous with the new District 26 after redistricting for the 2022 election.) Republican Matthew Rohrbach. She was endorsed by Planned Parenthood. McElroy was defeated by Rohrbach in the election.

=== Writing ===
McElroy has written about family medicine and preventive care for patients. The Sawbones Book, a companion to the podcast, was published by Weldon Owen in October 2018. The book was illustrated by Sydnee's sibling, Teylor Smirl.

== Personal life ==
She is married to writer and podcaster Justin McElroy, with whom she has two daughters.
