= The Adventure Zone =

American comedy roleplaying podcast

- Genre: Comedy; adventure; roleplaying; Fantasy podcast
- Language: English

Cast and voices
- Hosted by: Griffin, Justin, Travis, and Clint McElroy

Production
- Length: ~90 minutes

Publication
- No. of episodes: Balance: 69; Commitment: 4; Amnesty: 36; Dust: 8; Graduation: 38; Ethersea: 44; Steeplechase: 42; Outre Space: 4; Versus Dracula: 30; Abnimals: 28; Royale: 30
- Original release: August 18, 2014 (Note: As a special episode of My Brother, My Brother, and Me. This episode was re-uploaded as the first entry of a separate show on December 3, after which it began its regular release schedule.)
- Provider: Maximum Fun
- Updates: Biweekly (Note: The show ran weekly during the 2017-18 experimental era, and again from 2021-2025)

Related
- Related shows: My Brother, My Brother, and Me; Dimension 20
- Website: www.maximumfun.org/shows/adventure-zone

The Adventure Zone is a weekly comedy and adventure actual play podcast, in which the McElroy family play Dungeons & Dragons along with other role-playing games. The show is distributed by the Maximum Fun network and hosted by brothers Justin, Travis, and Griffin McElroy, and their father Clint McElroy. Regular episodes of the podcast feature the family solving puzzles, fighting enemies, and leveling up their characters in a series of cinematic and humorous encounters.

The Adventure Zone originated as a special episode of My Brother, My Brother and Me in 2014, which was spun off into a separate biweekly podcast later that year. The first 69 episode campaign Balance was followed by a series of short experimental arcs in the late 2010s, and subsequent campaigns have generally run for 30 to 45 episodes. To date, eleven campaigns have been depicted in a variety of game systems, with further settings used for live shows and donor bonus material. The show switched to a seasonal format from 2022, in which the family can return to earlier settings for further episodes.

The podcast has been credited alongside Critical Role with the Dungeons & Dragons renaissance that began in the mid 2010s, and influenced later shows in the actual play genre such as Dimension 20. Balance has since been adapted into a New York Times best selling graphic novel series. The podcast is often represented by the stone rune ᛥ as a logo, which was the symbol of the Bureau of Balance in the first campaign.

== History ==
=== Origins & Balance (2014–2017) ===
In 2010, the McElroy brothers launched their flagship podcast My Brother, My Brother and Me, a comedic advice podcast which joined the Maximum Fun network in 2011. During the 97th episode in May 2012, the brothers answered a question about a Dungeons & Dragons game—which Justin called "The Adventure Zone".

The McElroy brothers would ultimately begin playing with their father Clint in the summer of 2014, using the newly released Starter Set for the fifth edition of D&D, which was released that July. The set came with the module The Lost Mine of Phandelver, which served as the basis for the first few sessions. The first of these recordings was initially released as an experimental MBMBaM episode entitled The Adventure Zone on August 18, 2014, to cover for Justin's paternity leave. Starting that December, The Adventure Zone was then expanded into its own podcast on the Maximum Fun network, releasing biweekly. Griffin McElroy served as the show's primary host and Dungeon Master for the show's first campaign, later titled the Balance Arc. The campaign concluded with Episode 69 in August 2017. Additionally, three special episodes were released over the course of the campaign, titled The "The Adventure Zone" Zone, and these act as "an informal chat show" discussing the game.

"Déjà Vu" by Mort Garson (from the album Ataraxia: The Unexplained) served as the primary theme song for The Adventure Zone during the Balance Arc, as well as various interstitials and backing tracks. Griffin McElroy also created original compositions to enhance the show's production. Balance was highly popular; by 2016 a graphic novel adaptation was announced. These began running in 2018, with each volume covering one quest from the campaign. First Second books announced that the seventh volume of the graphic novel series, published in 2025, would be the final volume.

=== Experimental arcs & Amnesty (2017–2019) ===
Following the conclusion of the Balance campaign in August 2017, the McElroys decided to work on smaller "experimental arcs", a set of shorter campaigns using other systems, in order to give themselves time to develop their next overarching storyline. Three experimental arcs were aired from October 2017 to March 2018, with the show temporarily moving to a weekly schedule to get to a full second campaign (Note: Prior to the adoption of a revised seasonal format in 2022, the wider campaigns were occasionally referred to as "seasons". This was the case when selecting their next campaign in 2018.) more quickly. These experimental arcs included Clint's Commitment arc (played with the Fate system), Griffin's Amnesty arc, and the first four episodes of Travis's Dust arc (both played using Powered by the Apocalypse). Each of these arcs takes place in their own game worlds separate from those explored in the other campaigns, though elements have crossed over since.

With the conclusion of these experimental arcs, the McElroys announced that Amnesty would be "Season 2". Griffin McElroy again took on the role of game master (called a "Keeper" in the system) as they returned to the Amnesty setting for a further 31 episodes. While the arc was inspired by Monster of the Week shows such as Buffy the Vampire Slayer and Supernatural, Griffin stated that the arc is mostly based on the Persona game series. To replicate the less connected nature of the former's 1990s setting, Kepler is situated in West Virginia's section of the National Radio Quiet Zone. Hal Lublin provides a guest voice in two episodes. The campaign ended after 36 episodes on September 23, 2019.

When performing live, the McElroy family continued to predominantly use the Balance setting in this period, though two Amnesty live shows, The Ballad of Bigfoot and Amnesty Halloween Special, released on October 17, 2019, and November 12, 2020, respectively. Additional episodes of The "The Adventure Zone" Zone were released at the start and conclusion of the main run of Amnesty.

=== Graduation (2019–2021) ===
All four cast members played as guests in Dimension 20’s Tiny Heist campaign, a game DMed by Brennan Lee Mulligan and released in early 2020 on the Dropout network. Travis, the Dungeon Master of the upcoming arc, was inspired by Tiny Heist's worldbuilding, commenting that "the world in that was so well thought through that it was basically like a big playground..." Travis's role as DM was confirmed in a SyFy Wire interview. A trailer for Graduation released on October 18 and announced a return to the Dungeons & Dragons system. The fantasy themed campaign, centered around a school for heroes and villains, ran from October 31, 2019, to April 15, 2021. The arc was poorly received, with reviewers citing Travis's lack of experience as a DM, as well as the very high number of NPCs. Travis considered stepping back from the show around the 20th episode, and having someone else brought in to finish the season, but decided that would be unfair to those who were invested, including the players.

There were few live shows during the run of Graduation due to the COVID-19 pandemic, and none of these made use of Graduation's Nua setting. A "Laughter & Love" McElroy family tour in April 2020 would have featured The Adventure Zone performances in Boston and Baltimore. Instead of Nua or another established setting, a series of new campaign settings were used in virtual live shows, sometimes with multiple episodes and continuity between performances. These minor campaigns include Fur (with Erika Ishii), Hootenanny, Inheritance, Just Us, Mercer (with Matt Mercer) and Lords of Crunch.

Peacock announced in January 2020 that it had commissioned a script for an animated adaptation of The Adventure Zone, though the series did not progress beyond that stage.

=== Ethersea (2021–2022) ===
Before the finale of Graduation, Griffin McElroy confirmed in an interview with Brennan Lee Mulligan that the fourth season of Adventure Zone would also be played in the Dungeons & Dragons 5th edition system, and would involve ships. The campaign's name, Ethersea, and a brief trailer were released on May 3, 2021. The series is set in and around the submarine city of Founder's Wake, for which Griffin McElroy drew inspiration from a number of sources including The Eternal Darkness: A Personal History of Deep-Sea Exploration by Robert Ballard. A special primer episode was released on October 12 for the Maximum Fun Block Party, introducing new listeners to the podcast and suggesting where to begin- with Justin recommending Ethersea, Griffin recommending Balance, Clint recommending Amnesty and Travis recommending his experimental arc Dust. An Imbalance mini-series was released in November 2021 under a new moniker, The Zone of Adventure. The game featured Aabria Iyengar as DM and released on YouTube rather than through the Maximum Fun network. The series also included video of the players, rather than being recorded simply as a podcast. Ethersea continued to air alongside it during November.

There were several formatting changes brought into effect for Ethersea. Unlike previous arcs, in which world-building was undertaken privately by the GM, the world-building for Ethersea was a collaborative effort. This took the form of a five-episode prologue using the game system The Quiet Year, with the campaign proper beginning on July 8. The McElroys were able to hire Rachel Jacobs to handle post production of the series rather than editing it themselves, which made it possible for them to switch to a weekly rather than biweekly schedule.

With the pandemic still underway in the United States, the McElroys began a limited return to live shows, with performances at Emerald City Comic Con in 2021, as well as "live and virtual" remote shows. These used a variety of systems and settings, with some returning to the Hootenanny continuity seen in occasional live shows since 2019. This was followed by the "Fancy Takes Flight Tour" from March to July 2022, which featured several Adventure Zone performances across the United States, along with other McElroy family shows. Future live shows performed after the original run of Ethersea would broadly maintain the format- using one-shots in unique settings and occasionally reprising Hootenanny.

=== Steeplechase & switch to seasonal format (2022–2023) ===
With the conclusion of Ethersea in August 2022, the McElroys announced that The Adventure Zone would be adopting a seasonal format- with Dust returning for a short second season later that year, a new Steeplechase campaign to follow and finally a planned second season for Ethersea in the future. Dust aired as a four episode arc in September 2022, with Erika Ishii as a guest star. Steeplechase was the first arc to be GMed by Justin McElroy, set in a vast layered theme park. Justin McElroy cited the theme park documentary series Defunctland as an inspiration, while the layout of their home-layer Ustaben was based on Kings Island. The episodes were introduced by the character "Krystal with a K", in short clips inspired by Disney food vloggers. Krystal was voiced by Autumn Seavey Hicks.

Some technical changes were made during Steeplechase's run, with Griffin McElroy producing only the main theme for the arc with the rest of the soundtrack sourced externally by Jacobs. This included a rendition of Ephemera's theme song "Dream it to Now", which was produced for the finale by Eric Near. In September 2023, the family streamed "lofi taz radio ᛥ - beats to relax/study cantrips to", featuring 4 hours and 20 minutes of Griffin's original music from The Adventure Zone, and an animated rendition of the family surrounded by references to the series. The video is in the style of other YouTube lo-fi streams.

In an episode of The The Adventure Zone Zone following the conclusion of Steeplechase, the family revealed that the next arc would be GMed by Clint McElroy, in his first stint as GM on the show since Commitment in 2017. The shorter arc, named Outre Space, is a continuation of the story of War of the Realms: Journey into Mystery, the 2019 comic which starred Miles Morales, Kate Bishop, and Wonder Man, and had originally been written by the family. The arc also features Kate Welch and Gabe Hicks as guest players, portraying Kate Bishop and Miles Morales respectively. Outre Space aired across four episodes in late 2023.

=== Versus Dracula, Abnimals & Royale (2024–2026) ===
The show returned to fifth edition Dungeons & Dragons in January 2024 with Versus Dracula, DMed by Griffin McElroy. Versus Dracula was inspired by Curse of Strahd as well as public domain material, such as Frankenstein, and leaned heavier on improvisation than other campaigns. Griffin described it as a Dark Pictures Anthology of public domain material. Travis McElroy based his character Crawford on his maternal grandfather Crawford Kitchen.

This was followed by Abnimals later that year, which is inspired by the various cartoons of the 1990s and early 2000s that featured anthropomorphic heroes, such as Teenage Mutant Ninja Turtles. Running on an original system under Zookeeper Travis McElroy, the arc also included no swearing, in an effort to cater to younger audiences. Travis acknowledged that a number of parents had introduced their children to the show, which had been running for ten years by that point. The Abnimals campaign featured a new opening song written by Jonathan Coulton.

The following Squid Game inspired season, Royale, returned to a biweekly format.

Live shows during the era made use of the Angrave setting from Versus Dracula, with a different public domain work used for each show. Griffin McElroy has stated that the setting is perfect for live shows as there is a large volume of public domain material to draw on, and a limited need for elaborate costuming.

== Structure ==
=== Campaigns and seasons ===
To date the podcast has had several campaigns. The nomenclature for the division of campaigns has evolved over the course of The Adventure Zone's run, complicated by experimental arcs that were revisited by the family later for additional stories. Griffin McElroy jokingly commented during the experimental era "I don't even know how we're numbering these any more".

This table reflects the "season" nomenclature introduced in an episode of The The Adventure Zone Zone in 2022, which distinguishes each run of a campaign, including experimental arcs, as seasons. This definition has been applied to the remainder of the table, here listed by their original debut. Prior to that point the terms "season", "campaign" and "arc" were used interchangeably. Several of these campaigns were preceded by special episodes for world building and character generation, which are counted in the "Setup" column. For live episodes, the date of recordings' release is used rather than the date of the actual performance.

Series	Season	System	Setup	Episodes	Originally released	
Series	Season	System	Setup	Episodes	First released	Last released
Balance	Original	D&D 5E; The Stolen Century	0	69 (Note: A prequel donor bonus episode was also released in 2015)	August 18, 2014	August 17, 2017
Balance	Live shows	D&D 5E; The Stolen Century	0	14	December 13, 2015	May 16, 2019
Balance	Imbalance	D&D 5E; The Stolen Century	0	3	November 10, 2021 (Note: As a YouTube miniseries. The audio was re-released as three episodes of the podcast on 9 November 2023.)	November 24, 2021
Balance	Special (Note: 50th Live Show Spectacular!)	D&D 5E; The Stolen Century	0	1	April 17, 2026	
Commitment	1	FATE	1	4	October 2, 2017	November 30, 2017
Amnesty	1	Monster of the Week	1	5	January 4, 2018	February 9, 2018
Amnesty	2	Monster of the Week	0	31	April 12, 2018	September 23, 2019
Amnesty	Live shows	Monster of the Week	0	2	October 17, 2019	November 12, 2020
Dust	1	Urban Shadows	1	4	February 22, 2018	March 22, 2018
Dust	2	Urban Shadows	1	4	September 1, 2022	September 22, 2022
Graduation	1	D&D 5E	0	38	October 31, 2019	April 15, 2021
Ethersea	1	The Quiet Year; D&D 5E	5	44	May 6, 2021	July 26, 2022
Ethersea	2	The Quiet Year; D&D 5E	TBA	TBA	TBA	TBA
Steeplechase	1	Blades in the Dark	1	42	September 29, 2022	October 13, 2023
Outre Space	1	Marvel Multiverse Roleplaying Game	0	4	November 30, 2023	December 21, 2023
Versus Dracula	1	D&D 5E	0	30	January 11, 2024	August 4, 2024
Versus Dracula	Live shows	D&D 5E	0	9	May 23, 2024	April 23, 2026
Abnimals	1	Abnimals	1	28	September 19, 2024	May 1, 2025
Royale	1	D&D 5E	0	30	June 4, 2025	August 6, 2026

Additionally, there have been several side campaigns. These have variously been released as bonuses to Maximum Fun donors, or as live shows which are released online later. They are generally shorter, though Hootenanny in particular is currently five episodes in length. Some, such as Lords of Crunch, were initially performed live, with the recording released as a donor bonus. The dates here correspond with when the recordings were released for live shows, rather than the actual performance dates.

Season	Type	System	Episodes	Originally released	
Season	Type	System	Episodes	First released	Last released
The Great Switcheroo	Crossover specials	D&D 5E	2	October 8, 2015	December 29, 2016
(K)nights	Donor bonus	D&D 5E	3	March 3, 2016	March 30, 2017
Elementary	Donor bonus	Four Sherlock Holmes and a Vampire	2	April 2, 2018	March 26, 2019
Fur	Donor bonus	Honey Heist	1	March 11, 2019	
Hootenanny	Live shows/ bonus	Lasers and Feelings	5	October 3, 2019	November 23, 2023
Inheritance	Live show	Dadlands	4	November 28, 2019	January 8, 2026
Just Us	Live shows	SUPERNORMAL	2	February 25, 2021	August 25, 2022
Mercer	Donor bonus	D&D 5E	1	March 13, 2020	
Lords of Crunch	Donor bonus	Lasers and Feelings	1	July 26, 2020	
Charlieverse	Donor bonus	Muppet Babies RPG; Roll for Shoes; Cousinverse	4	May 2, 2021	April 20, 2026
Spirit Breakers	Live show	The Beast	2	October 27, 2022	May 11, 2023
Bone	Live show	Adventure Skeletons	1	June 22, 2023	
Plato's Rave	Donor Bonus	TBC	1	March 17, 2024	
Sexy Battle Wizards	Live show	TBC	1	May 29, 2025	

The campaigns are set in different worlds, however some elements do cross over. The character of Indrid Cold debuted as an NPC in Amnesty, as a resident of the planet Sylvain, and was later transported to the world of Dust via unknown means that are only alluded to vaguely in the narrative. Clint McElroy occasionally portrays an incarnation of himself, a "space janitor" who cameos in the background of scenes akin to Stan Lee's many cinematic appearances. Some thematic elements are also consistent across most campaign settings, including cat-themed merchants. During the Balance campaign, fans could suggest items to stock at "Fantasy Costco" for the characters to buy between quests. Audience submitted items were occasionally employed in later seasons also. Until Graduation in 2019, some NPC names were drawn from fans tweeting using the #zonecast hashtag.

=== Format ===
Episodes are generally around 90 minutes in length. The episodes are edited for brevity and also include music and sound effects. Until 2022, an opening segment acted as a recap of the existing story. This changed after Steeplechase, which instead featured clips of "Steepywatch", a parody of Disney Park Vlogs. From then on, the opening segment has generally been used for in-fiction humour; Versus Dracula for example opened with humorous excerpts from Dracula's journal. Royale returned to more traditional opening recaps.

Like other McElroy shows, the podcast includes a break in the middle which is used for sponsored advertisements and programming updates. Early on in the show's run, listeners could pay to have messages read out during the break through Maximum Fun's "Jumbotron" service. Demand was extremely high by the late 2010s, such that the Maximum Fun servers crashed during the sales event in late 2017. A raffle system was briefly introduced for the next sales round in May 2018, before the system was discontinued for both The Adventure Zone and My Brother, My Brother & Me.

Abnimals also featured tongue-in-cheek public service announcements from guest voice actors at the end of episodes, in a manner imitating some children's animated series. This segment was unique to the campaign.

=== Special episodes ===
Some episodes are unnumbered and do not depict gameplay. This includes The The Adventure Zone Zone, which acts as a talk show about the main campaigns and was introduced in 2016. TTAZZ episodes often air in the gap between two campaigns, and serve as a way to wrap up one and announce the next. Some campaigns have set-up episodes used for character generation, separate from the usual numbering. This was first introduced in 2017 for Commitment, but is not always employed. Ethersea in particular had 5 set up episodes covering collaborative world building.

== Campaigns ==
=== Balance ===
Balance depicts a global war on Faerûn catalyzed by the Grand Relics; seven powerful magical artifacts that compel their wielders to wreak havoc and destruction. At the end of the war, knowledge of the relics was erased from the population's minds, save for the Bureau of Balance which seeks to collect the relics. The narrative also explores the mysteries of the Red Robes, the magical faction that created the relics, and their relation to a cosmic threat. The campaign is broken into a series of quests to retrieve these relics, with "Lunar interlude" downtime episodes between. Atop the Bureau's moon base the characters can regroup, purchase new equipment, and prepare for the next quest.

- Here There Be Gerblins (Episodes 1–6) – The introductory quest is loosely based on the Dungeons & Dragons Starter Set adventure Lost Mine of Phandelver, but quickly diverges into the primary plot of the adventure. Taako, Merle and Magnus help Merle's cousin Gundren find and reclaim his family's lost treasures, but are quickly dragged into a conspiracy involving the Bureau and the Phoenix-Fire Gauntlet, the Grand Relic of evocation.
- Murder on the Rockport Limited (Episodes 10–16) – The party goes to reclaim a relic found by a Bureau operative killed after placing it in an impregnable vault on the Rockport Limited train. Finding a Rockport staff member murdered on the trip, the party must discover the murderer before the train arrives in Neverwinter. During their mission, they meet and are aided by the World's Greatest (boy) Detective, Angus McDonald. The party discovers and retrieves the Oculus, the Grand Relic of illusion.
- Petals to the Metal (Episodes 18–27) – The party is sent to retrieve the Gaia Sash, the Grand Relic of conjuration, used to control nature and weather. This relic is currently being used by a master thief known only as the Raven. Through a series of events, the party find themselves allied with Hurley, a law enforcer and former lover of the Raven, and taking part in a mostly-illegal death race to claim the relic. The plot for the quest occurred to Griffin while watching Fast Five.
- The Crystal Kingdom (Episodes 29–39) – The party travel to a floating laboratory in search of the Philosopher's Stone, the Grand Relic aligned with the school of transmutation. The Stone has caused a runaway gray goo disaster on a floating laboratory, which has been converted into a viral pink tourmaline. If the base crashes, the disaster will spread to the world below. The party must navigate the laboratory, track down rogue Bureau scientist Lucas, and face crystal golems. The arc introduces the beautiful undead bounty hunter, Kravitz. The plot for the quest occurred to Griffin while watching Alien.
- The Eleventh Hour (Episodes 41–49) – The party is sent into the Woven Gulch to retrieve the Temporal Chalice, the Grand Relic of Divination. Avi, friendly Bureau cannoneer, helps them enter a wild-west inspired town named Refuge which is trapped in a time loop. There, the party repeatedly cycle through the final hour of the town's life, and must avert its destruction.
- The Suffering Game (Episodes 51–57) – A darker quest in which the party must retrieve the Necromancy Grand Relic: the Animus Bell. the party delves into Wonderland, an endless labyrinth that promises whatever participants desire as a prize for surviving. The place is a trap created by a pair of Liches who feed on suffering. Inspired by Zero Escape.
- The Stolen Century (Episodes 60–66) – A prequel quest in which the party rediscovers their long-forgotten memories. This includes a century of adventures to keep the light of creation away from the Hunger, a cosmic devourer. The party, who are in fact the Red Robes, split the light into the seven relics to hide them but have their memories wiped. In the present day, the group reverse the memory wipe and learn the nature of the threat they face.
- Story and Song (Episodes 67–69) – The climactic finale quest, in which the Hunger arrives on Faerûn. Old friends and former foes join the party to stop it from consuming the world.

As the Dungeon Master, Griffin portrayed all non-player characters (except for Garyl, Taako's summoned phantasmal binicorn).

=== Commitment ===
The first experimental arc, Commitment is a superhero themed arc. The game was run by Clint McElroy using the FATE system. The characters all work for the Do Good Fellowship, a "cult adjacent" organization that uses technology and science to improve the world. This arc has a total of four episodes, not including the setup episode the McElroys used to establish their characters, etc.

=== Amnesty ===
Amnesty uses the Monster of the Week system by Evil Hat Productions, and is set in the fictional ski-resort town of Kepler in contemporary West Virginia. Kepler is regularly invaded by eldritch monsters nicknamed "Abominations" from a mysterious otherworld called Sylvain. The abominations are opposed by a monster-hunting organization called the Pine Guard, headquartered at the titular Amnesty Lodge. Sylvain is a dying world, being consumed by an evil force known as the Quell, and the latter half of the series involves the cast attempting to stop it. These abominations arrive on a monthly cycle, which form the basis for a series of monster hunts by the protagonists. Like Balance, Amnesty featured lunar or "lodger" interlude episodes for downtime between hunts.

- Hunt for the Beast (Episodes 1–5) – A bear-like monster is loose on Kepler, West Virginia. Duck Newton, Aubrey Little and Ned Chicane stumble across a gateway to the alien world of Sylvain, and learn of the monthly abominations that show up in town. They join up with the Pine Guard, a group of misfits attempting to keep the peace between the two worlds by dealing with these abominations quietly. They assist Mama in taking the beast down by luring it into a cave and setting it ablaze.
- Hunt for the Water (Episodes 6–11) – With a water monster attacking the town, the Pine Guard begin their second hunt. After saving a group of elderly swimmers, the Pine Guard lure the creature to local waterpark "H_{2}Whoa, That was Fun!" to take it down. Outside of this, Ned launches a TV show named "Saturday Night Dead", and Aubrey continues to explore her magic and connection to Sylvain.
- Hunt for the Calamity (Episodes 13–19) – With a series of strange prophesied accidents taking place over town, the Pine Guard attempt to intervene with a pizza sign collapse and Ned is almost killed. The group meet Indrid Cold, the Mothman, who has been attempting to warn the townspeople of these accidents but is not the culprit. The Pine Guard eventually track down the anomalous giant tree that is warping reality.
- Hunt for the Countenance (Episodes 21–28) – A shapeshifting abomination attacks the local motorbike gang, the Hornets, causing the gang to learn of the gate. The secret swiftly gets out among a number of Kepler residents. After a battle in a morgue, Ned steals an art piece for a former thief colleague, only for the thief to turn out to be the shapeshifter. The shapeshifter later takes Ned's form and announces the presence of monsters and a gateway on his TV show. A final confrontation at the gateway sees Ned killed, and the destruction of much of Kepler.
- Finale (Episodes 30–36) – After Ned's death, Clint McElroy changes his character to Arlo Thacker, previously an NPC. The Pine Guard and their allies from town infiltrate a government compound around the gate, and break through to a third location separate from either world. The Pine Guard learn that Earth and Sylvain were linked by an alien race intent on pairing aggressive civilizations up to destroy each other, in order to protect their own planet from potential future threats. The group desperately fight to save their world as well as Sylvain.

As the Keeper (GM), Griffin portrayed all non-player characters, with the exception of Agent Hanes who is portrayed by guest star Hal Lublin. The voice of Duck's talking sword Beacon is also provided by Justin.

=== Dust ===
Initially the third experimental arc, this setting was revisited for a second season in 2022. The campaign is set in the Crescent Territory, a fantasy-western territory divided between competing families and organizations. It is inhabited by the Fleshes (humans), the Fangs (vampires), and the Furs (werewolves), and there is great tension between these groups.

- Season One — After the politically sensitive murder of Jeremiah Blackwell, three detectives—Augustus Parsons, Errol Ryehouse and Gandy Dancer—are hired to solve the case before dawn in an effort to prevent fighting between the families of Dry River.
- Season Two — Augustus Parsons teams up with fellow detectives Indrid Cold and Callan after he is hired to bring Pearl Blackwell, now the heir to the town's mining business, back from Crescent City. Pearl in turn hires them to conduct a train heist as a condition of her leaving town with them. Erika Ishii guest stars as Louise "Lulu" Kagiyama.

As the Master of Ceremonies, Travis portrayed all NPCs, save for a comedic encounter in the first season where the family portrayed a series of townspeople coming out to see why the warning bell had been rung.

=== Graduation ===
The players initially take on the role of students who have enrolled in the henchperson and sidekick program at Hieronymous Wiggenstaff's School for Heroism and Villainy. The campaign focuses initially on their classes and misadventures at the school, but later moves to broader themes such as Order vs. Chaos, threats of Demon wars, mind control vs. free will, and rebellion against capitalism Unlike the other campaigns, Graduation is not formally split up into quests or other sections. Travis McElroy, as DM, portrayed all non-player characters.

=== Ethersea ===
The Ethersea campaign was announced on May 3, 2021 and began on May 6, 2021. The first five episodes were not played in Dungeons & Dragons, but used a world-building tabletop game called The Quiet Year. The prologue tells the story of a group of survivors with one year to find a way to transport their society underwater, as a worldwide magical storm threatens to wipe out all above-water life. The prologue does not feature consistent characters for each player, with all at the table instead making decisions for the society, developing and occasionally portraying interchangeable characters. The campaign proper began the following week, detailing the lives of a group of adventurers making their way in the new underwater city of Founder's Wake. Like Balance, the campaign is divided into a series of quests with interludes for downtime between.

- The Gallery Job (Episodes 1–5) – In order to succeed in a job interview, Amber, Devo and Zoox are told that they need a ship. The trio inadvertently help in the theft of one- and undertake a job attempting to loot a submerged gallery. The mission goes poorly, with an attack by pirates de-railing the operation. They do however net enough money to purchase their own ship, the Coriolis.
- The Infinite Clam (Episodes 7–12) – Newly hired by the Bluespan Brokerage, the trio set off in search of a missing member of the Benevolent Parish, and tumble into a clamshell of infinite capacity. They investigate a city on the interior, and hunt down the anomaly causing the spatial distortion.
- The Abyssal Auction (Episodes 14–19) – The group are contracted to attend an auction on behalf of Old Joshy, encountering a mysterious collection of anonymous high rollers. With only a limited pool of cash, they are forced to engage in strategies such as bid rigging to achieve their goal. Shortly afterwards, the auction descends into violence and the party flees.
- Cambria's Call (Episodes 22–30) — Founder's Wake is contaminated by a spore that was unwittingly carried in by the Coriolis, resulting in a second epidemic of a disease named the Sallow. With the infrastructure of the city in peril, the party attempt to restore the memory of Finneas Cawl in order to repair it and save the city. By means of a drug-fueled shared dream, the party is able to explore Cawl's memories, and head out in search of a bubble city he had found on the seafloor. They return with fresh magical phytoplankton to produce oxygen for Founder's Wake.
- The Menagerie (Episodes 31–36) — The party are contracted to solve a theft at a local menagerie. This takes them to the headquarters of an organization called Crescendo at the behest of Aloysius Supreme. The crew destroys this base and, unfortunately, the Dreams of Deborah, and return to Founder's Wake with the animals.
- Benefactor's Folly (Episodes 39–43) — The party alongside Ballaster Kodira attempt to track down and stop Benefactor Orlean. This leads them to a coral dome concealing a portal to another world.
- Finale (Episode 44) — A wrap-up episode covering the months after their confrontation at the coral dome.

As DM, Griffin portrayed all NPCs during the campaign proper, with the exception of a flashback sequence in episodes 26 and 27. In these episodes the NPC Finneas Cawl is taken over by Clint, with Travis and Justin portraying new characters.

=== Steeplechase ===
The Steeplechase campaign is set in an eponymous vast and all encompassing amusement park. It is not formally broken up into arcs denoted in the episode titles as previous campaigns were, but is naturally divided by the heists the players are involved in. These are interspersed by formal downtime periods in which the characters can engage in their vices. Each heist takes place in a different layer, though they return to Ustaben for a second heist later in the campaign. The story is framed by an enigmatic character known variously as the Nano Father or Creaky Man.

- Ustaben (Episodes 1–2) — The party conduct a heist in the Prize Pantry, an attraction based around opening boxes of cereal to search for prizes. They set out to retrieve an anniversary pin at its public showcase before it is placed in the box.
- Gutter City (Episodes 4–10) — Blackmailed by Sticky Fingers Paul Pantry, the mascot of Prize Pantry who has security footage of their previous, somewhat bungled heist, the party sets out to steal a getaway vehicle from Gutter City. They are aided by a roguish crew including a bizarre trickster named Funny Man.
- Passion's Cove (Episodes 12–16) — Now pursued by robot assassins known as barristers, the party must keep moving. They are hired by Scott Boldflex, former employee of queer inclusive reality dating show Passion's Cove (a parody of Bachelor in Paradise). Boldflex has been replaced by an artificial version of himself, and hires the party to disable his hard-light replacement and steal his old guitar Sympatico. The party must compete in the show in order to reach him.
- Ephemera (Episodes 17–24) — Having succeeded in Passion's Cove, the party are hired by Kenchel Denton to steal the spire from Ephemera, the fantasy themed layer. Ephemera parodies various fantasy franchises including Shrek and The Adventure Zone: Balance. They face the mechanical dragon Geltfrimpen on behalf of arms merchant Dave Ballista, and then enact a heist for the spire itself.
- Ustaben (Second arc, episodes 25–31) — After returning from Ephemera, the group find that Sticky Fingers Paul Pantry has been murdered, and must find his killer. The investigation is interrupted by Funny Man's abduction of Kenchel Denton. The party rescue him, only to learn that the abduction was Funny Man's pitch to join Steeplechase formally, and that Kenchel Denton had killed Paul Pantry to tie up loose ends in light of the party joining his employ.
- New Kidadelphia (Episodes 32–42) — The party are dumped by Kenchel in New Kidadelphia, a western-themed layer which was formerly a creche for the park. The children there have been abandoned by parents having too much fun elsewhere, and over the years have built their own society. The group search for a way out of the isolated layer, encountering a jungle populated by "Metamals", discarded animatronics. After killing one in a panic, they are forced to stand trial for their actions by the Metamals. Desiring to escape through a waste chute in the ceiling of the layer, they agree to seek out the area's expert, the Nano Father. He turns out to be an artificial replica of Carmine Denton, intent on destroying Steeplechase with a missile.

As GM, Justin portrayed all NPCs during the campaign, with the exception of Krystal, a character present in the introductory vlogger segments that act as recaps for previous episodes. Krystal is portrayed by Autumn Seavey Hicks.

=== Outre Space ===
As a shorter campaign, Outre Space is not divided up into arcs. The campaign is set in the Marvel Universe and is a non-canon follow-up to the 2019 War of the Realms: Journey into Mystery comic miniseries written by the McElroys. After Thor's baby sister Laussa is captured by the Black Order, the Babysitters (Thori, Sebastian Druid, Wonder Man, Kate Bishop & Miles Morales) reunite to travel into space and find her. They resupply at Knowhere, and are confronted by Silver Surfer impersonator The Samarium Sweeper. They make their way to the Flinnux cluster, a stellar storage unit set up by Glabella Flinnux of the Nova Corps, and confront the Black Order.

=== Versus Dracula ===
The Versus Dracula campaign was announced on December 28, 2023 and began on January 11, 2024. The campaign again uses the Dungeons & Dragons 5E system, with Griffin McElroy as Dungeon Master. The campaign is not formally split into arcs, and follows a group of adventurers in the gothic realm of Angrave, intent on killing Dracula. In order to achieve this they must associate with werewolves and a variety of other monsters. The party undertakes a lengthy journey to reach Dracula's castle, only to determine that he is actually in the city of Lumineaux, back where they started.

=== Abnimals ===
Abnimals features a number of animal themed heroes in the vein of Teenage Mutant Ninja Turtles. The arc featured many guest voices for NPCs who appear in pre- or post-episode segments- at other times these characters are portrayed by Travis. These include:

- Paul Foxcroft as Krilliam
- Erika Ishii as JJ August
- Aabria Iyengar as Special Agent Crane
- Jason Charles Miller as Jeff Leopard
- Sarah Moore as Majestica the Dragon Rider
- Brennan Lee Mulligan as Sgt. Salamander
- Sandeep Parikh as Spike Splosion
- Laser Webber as himself

=== Royale ===
In the Royale campaign, players compete in a 64-person Squid Games-like battle royale on top of a floating island. The victor of this conclave will join an immensely powerful group of wizards known as the Octave and inherit their arcane power. The campaign uses the new Dungeons & Dragons 5E (2024) rules, with Griffin McElroy as Dungeon Master. Clint, Justin, and Travis play characters who come from all corners of the Fold, a small land surrounded by a mysterious wall of fog. The conclave begins with 64 wizards, but through each trial of arcane ability there will be fewer and fewer, until only one remains.

=== Providence ===
Providence uses the SUPERNORMAL tabletop role-playing system, previously featured in The Adventure Zone: Just Us, rather than Dungeons & Dragons 5th Edition. The campaign premiered on October 1st, 2026, with Travis McElroy serving as game master. Clint, Justin, and Griffin McElroy portray three minor gods attempting to blend in with mortals while investigating a dark ritual in the village of Asta.

== Characters ==
In addition to the four main cast members, some arcs feature guests. These are generally in the form of pre-recorded NPC cameos or live show appearances, though Dust and Outre Space featured guests as full player characters.

Campaign
Campaign	Clint McElroy	Griffin McElroy	Justin McElroy	Travis McElroy	Guest(s)
Balance	Merle Highchurch; Dwarf cleric	Dungeon Master (DM)	Taako; Elf wizard	Magnus Burnsides; Human fighter	Stuart Wellington as Brad Bradson (Live)
Balance	Merle Highchurch; Dwarf cleric	Davenport (Imbalance)	Taako; Elf wizard	Magnus Burnsides; Human fighter	Aabria Iyengar as a guest DM (Imbalance)
Commitment	Game Master (GM)	Chris Rembrandt/Springheel	Irene Baker/Kardala	Nadiya Jones	None
Amnesty	Edmund "Ned" Chicane (1-29); The Crooked	Keeper (GM)	Wayne "Duck" Newton; The Chosen / The Mundane	Aubrey Little / The Lady Flame; The Spell-Slinger	Hal Lublin as Agent Hanes (NPC)
Amnesty	Arlo Thacker (29-36); The Searcher	Keeper (GM)	Wayne "Duck" Newton; The Chosen / The Mundane	Aubrey Little / The Lady Flame; The Spell-Slinger	Hal Lublin as Agent Hanes (NPC)
Dust	Gandy Dancer (S1)	Errol RyeHouse (S1)	Augustus Parsons	Master of Ceremonies (MC)	Erika Ishii as Louise "Lulu" Kagiyama (S2)
Dust	Callan (S2)	Indrid Cold (S2)	Augustus Parsons	Master of Ceremonies (MC)	Erika Ishii as Louise "Lulu" Kagiyama (S2)
Graduation	Argonaut "Argo" Keene; Water Genasi rogue	Sir Fitzroy Maplecourt; Half-elf Wild Magic barbarian	"The Firbolg"; Firbolg druid	Dungeon Master (DM)	None
Ethersea	Zoox Anthellae; Brinarr ranger	Dungeon Master (DM)	Amber Gris; Monk	Devo la Main; Orator	None
Steeplechase	Emerich Dreadway; Whisper Playbook	Montrose Pretty; Slide Playbook	Game Master (GM)	Beef Punchley; Cutter Playbook	Autumn Seavey Hicks as Krystal (NPC)
Outre Space	Game Master (GM)	Thori	Sebastian Druid/ The Druid	Simon Williams/ Wonder Man	Kate Welch as Kate Bishop/ Hawkeye
Outre Space	Game Master (GM)	Thori	Sebastian Druid/ The Druid	Simon Williams/ Wonder Man	Gabe Hicks as Miles Morales/ Spider-Man
Versus Dracula	Brother Phileuax; Artificer	Dungeon Master (DM) (Note: During live shows, the DM role rotates.)	Lady Godwin; Barbarian	Crawford "Mutt" Muttner; Ranger	Theresa McElroy as Glinda (NPC, Live)
Versus Dracula	Brother Phileuax; Artificer	Winnie-the-Pooh (Live)	Lady Godwin; Barbarian	Crawford "Mutt" Muttner; Ranger	Theresa McElroy as Glinda (NPC, Live)
Abnimals	Roger Mooer	Navy Seal	Axe-O-Lyle	Zookeeper (ZK)	Many NPC cameos, see list
Royale	Hellgrammite; Thri-kreen wizard	Dungeon Master (DM)	Lorovith Dreamwanderer Gonjavon; Goliath wizard	Rictus Ravenwood IV; Elf wizard	None

== Reception ==
The podcast has been well-received, especially among younger and LGBT+ demographics. It has sold out dozens of live shows since 2014, and has been downloaded hundreds of millions of times. One of the creators, Justin McElroy, said of the podcast, "[it] has a following." The Adventure Zone currently holds a 4.9 rating on Podbay, and a 5.0 rating on Apple Podcasts.

The Balance arc received overwhelmingly positive criticism. It was described by The Mary Sue as "one of the most moving and epic adventures of recent memory." The climactic ending in particular was warmly received. Patrick Rothfuss stated the show possessed “some of the finest storytelling I have ever experienced. In any genre. Ever.”

The Amnesty arc was described by The Mary Sue as possessing a "uniquely compassionate kind of story-telling, based on connection and hope, and that's something so rare in this world that even the imperfect efforts must be applauded, simply because there's nothing else quite like it out there." Comic Book Resources also received the arc positively, stating that it was "filled with great characters, goofs, and heart-wrenching moments."

The Dust arc's two seasons were well received by The Escapist. "Not only did Dust deliver a tight, satisfying mystery, but it brought moments emblematic of the familial humor distinct to The Adventure Zone‘s gameplay, like the town’s collective roast of Griffin McElroy’s Errol."

The Graduation arc received criticism for Travis McElroy's performance as dungeon master, with complaints that the arc had a confusing plot line, an overabundance of secondary characters, and a lack of meaningful consequences for poor dice rolls by the players. Graduation was poorly received for its heavy exposition, lack of player agency and large cast of non-player characters (NPCs). The Mary Sue commented that "Travis... went a bit too far in crafting his own narrative and didn’t let his players, well, play enough." The positive representation of Fitzroy Maplecourt as the show's first asexual character however was praised. Em Rowntree of The Geekiary was more positive about the direction of the campaign, emphasizing that "the heart of TAZ as far as I'm concerned is a sort of very stupid and unexpectedly emotional outrageousness. It soars when it's narratively unjustifiable."

The Ethersea arc was described as a "solid entry" by The Escapist, but levelled some criticism at the slow worldbuilding introduction and the arc's macro plot.

The Steeplechase arc was warmly received by The Escapist, which described it as a "return to form" for the show, praising the use of smaller arcs and comedic encounters. The introduction of the character Shlabethany during the Passion's Cove episodes was also highlighted by CBR.

The podcast has been the subject of several works of scholarship in academic books and peer-reviewed journals, including analysis which views it as an example of participatory culture, collaborative storytelling, and queer representation.

== Graphic novel adaptations ==
The Balance campaign has been adapted into a series of graphic novels, which were written by the McElroys, illustrated by Carey Pietsch, and published by First Second Books. A total of six volumes have been published, with the final volume set released on July 2026. Upon release, the first volume topped New York Times' best-selling trade fiction list, becoming the first graphic novel to do so. Subsequent volumes have similarly become New York Times Bestsellers.

For the launch of the sixth book, The Suffering Game, the family each produced some original artwork. The art was demonstrated on an episode of The McElroy Family Clubhouse, and was auctioned off to support the Palestine Children's Relief Fund.

Title	Release date	Paperback ISBN	Hardcover ISBN
Here There Be Gerblins	July 17, 2018	9781250153708	not published
Murder on the Rockport Limited!	July 16, 2019	9781250153715	9781250229281
Petals to the Metal	July 14, 2020	9781250232632	9781250232625
The Crystal Kingdom	July 13, 2021	9781250232656	9781250232663
The Eleventh Hour	February 21, 2023	9781250793782	9781250793799
The Suffering Game	July 16, 2024	9781250861726	9781250861733
Story and Song	July 14, 2026	9781250861740	9781250861757

== Animated series ==
In the early 2020s, an animated adaptation of Balance was in development for the NBCUniversal's streaming service Peacock. In July 2020, the McElroys revealed that they were developing the pilot and that it would be different from both the podcast and graphic novel versions, and possibly feature a different voice cast. Travis McElroy stated in 2024 that the series had fallen through, attributing the cancellation to changes in the entertainment industry in the wake of the COVID-19 pandemic. He stated however that the family would be open to returning to the concept at a later time.

== See also ==
- Critical Role
- Fantasy podcast
- HarmonQuest
