= Travis McElroy =

American podcaster, writer, and comedian (born 1983)

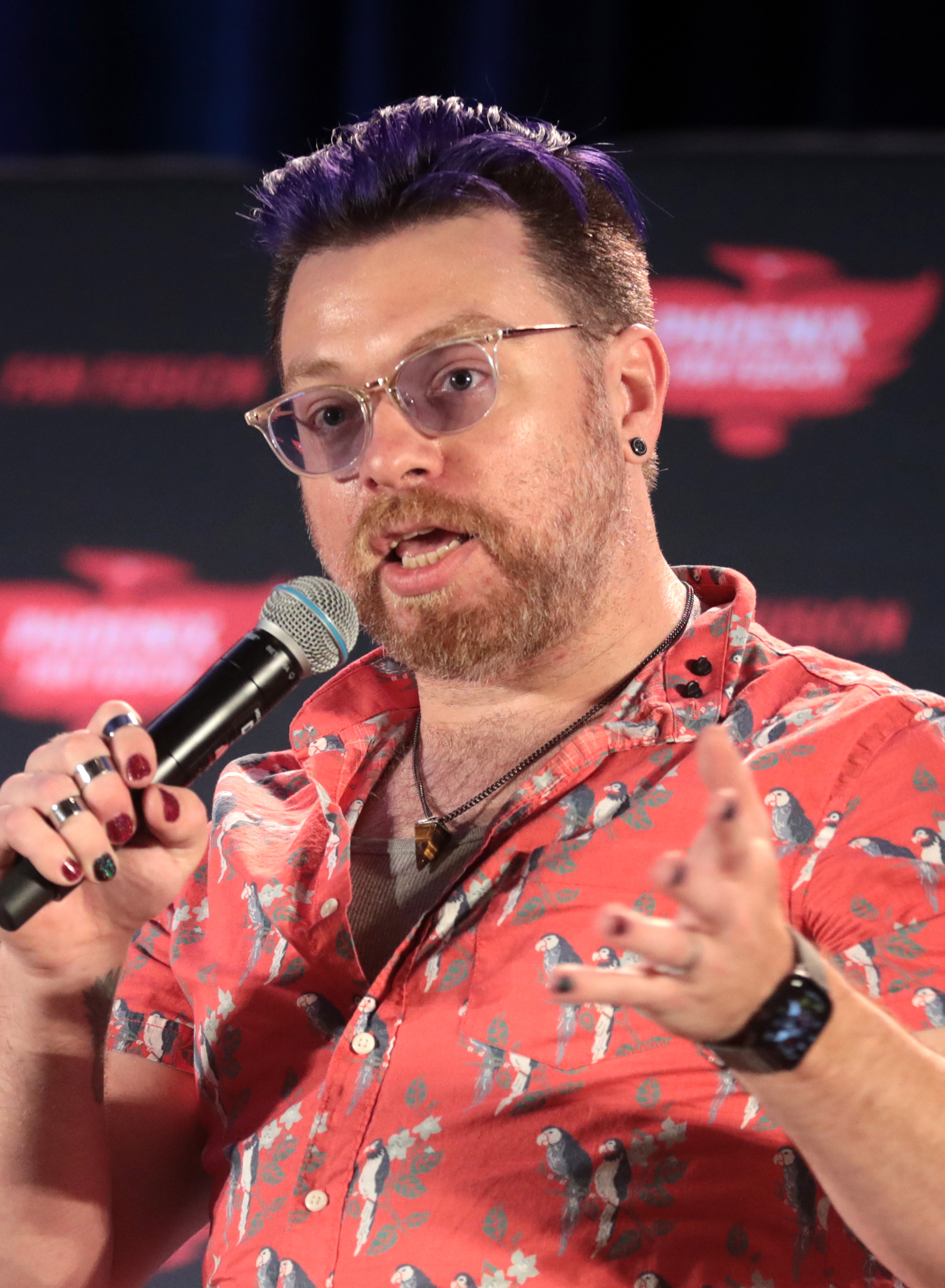
- McElroy at the 2022 Phoenix Fan Fusion
- Born: November 8, 1983 (age 42); Huntington, West Virginia
- Education: University of Oklahoma
- Occupation: Podcaster
- Years active: 2010–present
- Known for: Work as podcaster
- Notable work: My Brother, My Brother and Me; The Adventure Zone; Can I Pet Your Dog?; Shmanners
- Spouse: Teresa McElroy (m. 2013)
- Children: 2
- Father: Clint McElroy
- Relatives: Justin McElroy (brother); Griffin McElroy (brother); Sydnee McElroy (sister-in-law)
- Website: www.travismcelroy.com

Travis Patrick McElroy (/ˈmæk.əlˌrɔɪ/ MACK-əl-roy, born November 8, 1983) is an American podcaster, writer, and comedian. He is known for his work on podcasts such as My Brother, My Brother and Me, Shmanners, The Adventure Zone, and Can I Pet Your Dog?.

== Life ==
Travis McElroy was born November 8, 1983 to Leslie and her husband Clint McElroy, former co-host at WTCR-FM in Huntington, West Virginia. Travis McElroy is an alumnus of the University of Oklahoma. He married Teresa McElroy in 2013. They have two children.

== Career ==
=== Theatre ===
Travis McElroy worked as technical director at the Cincinnati Shakespeare Company from 2009 to 2014. In November 2024, McElroy guest starred in the stage production of Dungeons & Dragons: The Twenty-Sided Tavern which combines actual play, improv, and immersive theater at Stage 42 in New York City.

=== Podcasting ===
Since 2010, Travis McElroy, along with his brothers Justin and Griffin, has co-hosted the comedy podcast My Brother, My Brother and Me, an "advice show for the moderen [sic] era" hosted as part of the Maximum Fun network. The brothers also starred in a 2017 TV show based on the podcast, which originally aired on Seeso.

In 2014, the McElroy brothers, along with their father Clint McElroy, launched a tabletop role-playing game podcast entitled The Adventure Zone. Initially playing Dungeons & Dragons, the show moved into other game systems in later seasons, but returned to Dungeons & Dragons for the third and fourth campaign.

During the first arc, Balance, Travis McElroy portrays Magnus Burnsides, a human fighter. In the second campaign, Amnesty, Travis portrays magician Aubrey Little. He acted as Dungeon Master for the show's third campaign, Graduation. In the fourth campaign, Ethersea, he played a bard named Devo. In the fifth campaign, Steeplechase, he plays a former arm wrestler named Lyndon "Beef Punchley" Julius.

The first sub-arc of The Adventure Zone: Balance, named Here There Be Gerblins, was later adapted into a graphic novel in cooperation with artist Carey Pietsch, and was published by First Second Books in 2018. The book topped the New York Times' best-selling trade fiction list, becoming the first graphic novel to do so. It was followed by further graphic novels: Murder on the Rockport Limited! in 2019, Petals to the Metal in 2020, and The Crystal Kingdom in 2021.

From 2015 to 2016, McElroy also co-hosted the podcast Can I Pet Your Dog? with Allegra Ringo and Renee Colvert, leaving after the 57th episode due to the fact that he was moving house and expecting a child. However, McElroy did later return as a guest star for episodes 71 and 81. McElroy also co-hosted the "doomsday prepping" comedy podcast Bunker Buddies with Andie Bolt from 2014 to 2018, at which point he retired from the show and was replaced by Ben Ellis, and Trends Like These with former roommate Brent Black and writer Courtney Enlow from 2015 until its conclusion in 2020. He currently co-hosts Shmanners since 2016 with his wife, Teresa.

McElroy and his brothers also co-host a yearly podcast with Tim Batt and Guy Montgomery, released every American Thanksgiving since 2015, called 'Til Death Do Us Blart where they review the film Paul Blart: Mall Cop 2. The brothers also host the documentary podcast The McElroy Brothers Will Be in Trolls World Tour, which ultimately resulted in the announcement that all three were set to make cameo appearances in the film.

In 2018, Travis McElroy appeared as a guest star on Dice, Camera, Action as part of the Stream of Many Eyes, a Dungeons & Dragons event promoting the new Waterdeep storyline.

=== Other appearances ===
Travis has appeared multiple times as a guest on The George Lucas Talk Show, including at the 2018 New York Comic Con panel, as well as with his brothers on the May the 4th, 2020 fundraiser The George Lucas Talk Show All Day Star Wars Movie Watch Along and the December 22, 2020 episode The George Lucas Holiday Special.

Podcasts
Years active	Name	Hosts	Notes
2010–present	My Brother, My Brother and Me	Travis McElroy, Griffin McElroy, Justin McElroy	
2012	In Case Of Emergency	Travis McElroy, Jeremy Dubin, Miranda McGee	
2014–2018	Bunker Buddies	Travis McElroy, Andie Bolt, Ben Ellis	Ben replaced Travis as host in 2018.
2014–present	The Adventure Zone	Travis McElroy, Clint McElroy, Griffin McElroy, Justin McElroy	
2015–present	Can I Pet Your Dog?	Travis McElroy, Allegra Ringo, Renee Colvert, Alexis B. Preston	Alexis replaced Travis as host in 2016.
2015–2020	Trends Like These	Travis McElroy, Brent Black, Courtney Enlow	
2015–present	'Til Death Do Us Blart	Travis McElroy, Griffin McElroy, Justin McElroy, Tim Batt, Guy Montgomery	
2016–2017	Interrobang with Travis and Tybee	Travis McElroy, Tybee Diskin	
2016–present	Shmanners	Travis McElroy, Teresa McElroy	
2017–2018	The Kind Rewind	Travis McElroy, Teresa McElroy	
2017–2020	The McElroy Brothers Will Be In Trolls: World Tour	Travis McElroy, Griffin McElroy, Justin McElroy	Formerly named The McElroy Brothers Will Be In Trolls 2.
2017–2019	Run: A Doctor Who Fancast	Travis McElroy, Tybee Diskin	
2017–2018	Surprisingly Nice	Travis McElroy, Hal Lublin	
2018–2019	Positiviteeny	Travis McElroy, Amy Dallen, Erika Ishii	
2020–present	Bake On	Travis McElroy, Teresa McElroy	

=== Voice acting ===
Travis provides voice commentary for the 2017 video game 100ft Robot Golf, along with Justin and Griffin.

In September 2018, following a successful podcasting campaign, Travis, Justin and Griffin confirmed that they would be voicing the character Skyscraper in the animated film Trolls World Tour, with Travis also voicing Rock Tear.

Travis had a guest star role as Cutie in the Summer Camp Island season 4 episode "Oscar & His Demon."

== Awards and achievements ==
In 2021, a newly discovered species of millipede was named Nannaria mcelroyorum in recognition of the McElroy family's podcasts, which entertained the scientists during their field work. The millipede is found in West Virginia as well as the wider Appalachian region.
