= Joystiq =

Video gaming blog

- Website type: Computer and video game blog
- Successors: Engadget Gaming; Massively Overpowered; Polygon
- Country of origin: United States
- Owner: Weblogs, Inc.
- Editors: Ben Zackheim (2004-05); Vladimir Cole (2005-07); Chris Grant (2007-12); Ludwig Kietzmann (2012-15)
- Website: joystiq.com
- Launched: June 16, 2004
- Current status: Shut down on February 3, 2015

Joystiq was a video gaming blog which was part of the Weblogs, Inc. family later owned by AOL. It was active from 2004 to 2015, acting as the primary video game blog for the group, and operating alongside Engadget and sister blogs such as Massively. From 2007 it hosted The Joystiq Podcast, which was hosted by editor-in-chief Chris Grant, reviews editor Justin McElroy and Ludwig Kietzmann. The website's staff also included Justin's brother Griffin McElroy as weekend editor. The original podcast was discontinued in 2011, but similar shows continued for the remainder of the site's lifetime in various formats.

Grant and the McElroy brothers left the site in 2012 to found the gaming website Polygon, with Kietzmann taking over as editor-in-chief. The site's readership declined through the following years, and Joystiq was shut down by AOL on February 3, 2015. The web address today redirects to Engadget Gaming, which hosts much of the site's old content. Joystiq's Massively team branched off during the closure and launched Massively Overpowered.

== History ==
=== Origins (2004–2006) ===
In the early 2000s, the blog network Weblogs, Inc. was exploring their video game coverage. Peter Rojas, the founder and leader of Engaget, acknowledged that video games were too broad a subject to be covered by their flagship blog alone. Joystiq was therefore intended to cover that area. The site first began with a soft launch in April 2004, and Rojas formally unveiled the site on June 16. Joystiq emerged at a time when gaming websites were limited to large corporate-owned entities. It emerged as a smaller player in the space, primarily competing with Kotaku, which launched around the same time.

In June 2005 senior editor Ben Zackheim, after being offered a position at AOL's Games division, announced his resignation due to a conflict of interest. He was succeeded by Vladimir Cole.

Joystiq broadened its coverage with dedicated blogs for different consoles from late 2005. The move towards specialised blogs came shortly after Weblogs was acquired by AOL, which was announced in October 2005. The first of the new blogs launched in November 2005- coinciding with the North American launch of the Xbox 360. Joystiq launched Xbox 360 Fanboy, a blog devoted solely to the in-depth coverage of its namesake hardware. New staff were hired that month, including Jennie Lees, Blake Snow and Chris Grant. For the next three weeks Joystiq unveiled additional console-specific spinoffs, including PSP Fanboy on November 28, WoW Insider on December 6, and DS Fanboy on December 12. On February 15, 2006, a sixth blog was introduced: Revolution Fanboy, (which was later renamed to Nintendo Wii Fanboy), while March 29 heralded the arrival of PS3 Fanboy, completing Joystiq's trifecta of specialized next-gen coverage. While some criticized the practice of splintering off Joystiq's primary areas of expertise, Jason Calacanis justified these actions by asserting that separate blogs were necessary to fulfill these specialized niches.

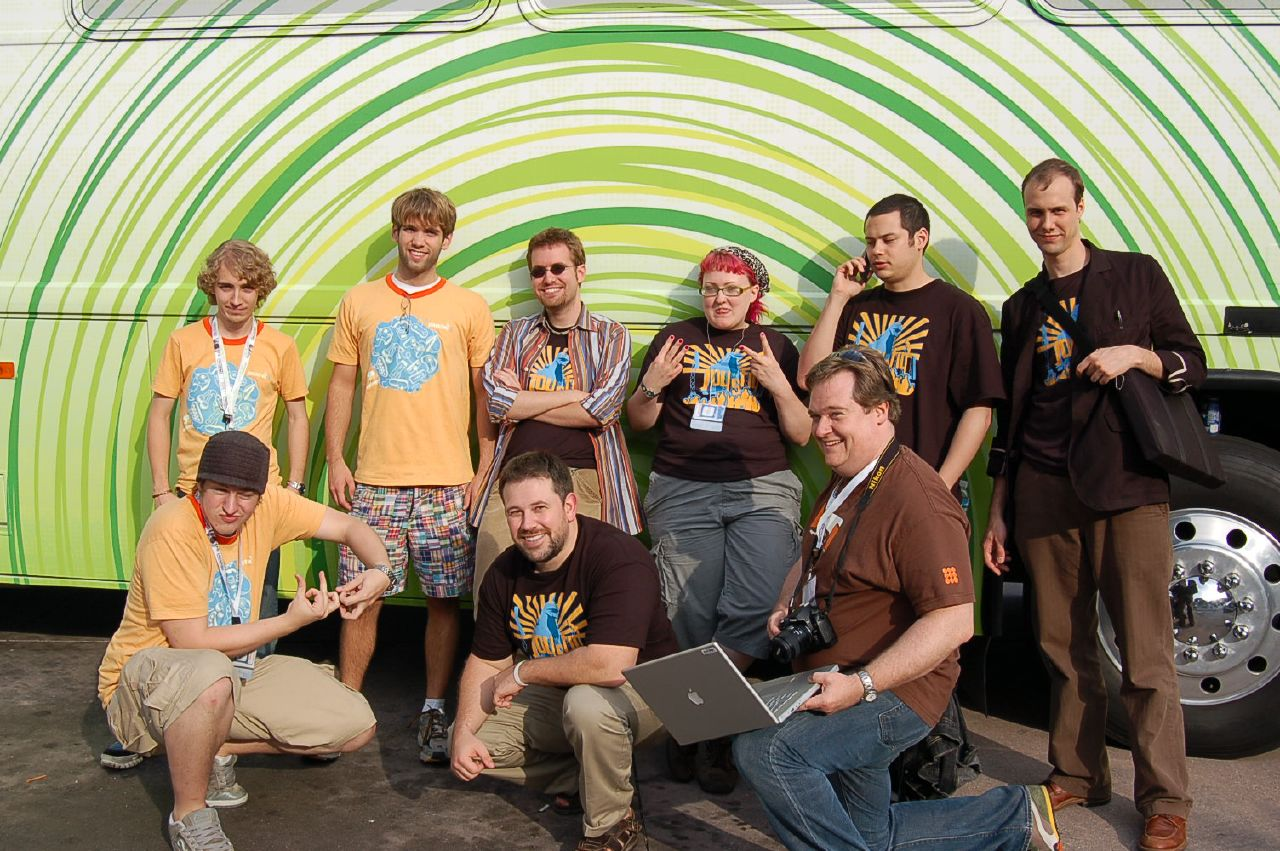
Joystiq's E3 2006 crew

On January 26, 2006, Joystiq coined the phrase "DS phat", a nickname for the old-style Nintendo DS that helps differentiate between the launch model DS and the DS Lite. The nickname remained in informal use for decades.

=== Grant era (2007–2012) ===
Cole moved to Microsoft's Xbox division in 2007, and Chris Grant became editor-in-chief for the website. He was also one of the inaugural hosts for The Joystiq Podcast, a weekly discussion show for video game news and culture. The other hosts for the show were Ludwig Kietzmann and Justin McElroy. The podcast would become an enduring feature that persisted in various forms for the remainder of the site's lifetime. Grant's tenure also saw one further blog launched, in the form of Massively. The new blog was designed to cover MMOs in general (as opposed to the World of Warcraft specific WoW Insider). It launched on November 2, 2007.

From 2009 Joystiq underwent a period of consolidation, merging several of the spinoff blogs back into the main site. This began with the "Fanboy" pages that January, which were rebranded and integrated directly into the main Joystiq site. DS and Wii Fanboy were merged into Joystiq Nintendo, the PSP and PS3 Fanboy merged into Joystiq PlayStation, and Xbox 360 Fanboy became Joystiq Xbox. Until 2010, these sites continued to feature specialized posts in addition to relevant content from the main Joystiq site. The arrangement was ultimately only briefly in effect, as in June 2010 the site rebranded and folded all three back into the main site as part of the "Futurestiq" overhaul. The staff from those companion blogs were folded into Joystiq full-time.

=== Kietzmann era (2012-2015) ===
In January 2012, the website lost several key staff members. The editor-in-chief Chris Grant, along with managing editor Justin McElroy and reviews editor Griffin McElroy left to form their own gaming website. The three were co-founders of Polygon under Vox Media. Ludwig Kietzmann replaced Grant as editor-in-chief, moving from South Africa to the United States to take the role. That April, the site cancelled The Joystiq Show to launch Super Joystiq Podcast, returning to the more conversational format used in the original show Kietzmann hosted with McElroy and Grant.

In January 2015, co-owned blog TechCrunch reported that AOL was planning to shutter underperforming content properties, particularly in the technology and lifestyle verticals, to focus on its stronger properties, video, and advertising sales. On January 27, 2015, Re/code reported that Joystiq was among the sites that were "likely" to be shut down as part of this restructuring plan. Readership of Joystiq had seen sharp declines, falling by at least 18% over the previous year. On January 30, 2015, various Joystiq staff members, and eventually the site itself, confirmed that the site, along with its spin-offs Massively and WoW Insider, and fellow AOL property TUAW, would cease operations after February 3, 2015. Gaming-oriented coverage was assumed by Engadget. The closure drew an outpouring of sympathy from the wider sector. Kotaku called for "A moment to reflect on what would have been had not Joystiq helped usher in this age of gaming and coverage."

== Legacy ==
Griffin and Justin McElroy, along with their brother Travis McElroy, started the podcast My Brother, My Brother and Me in 2010, around a year before the discontinuation of The Joystiq Podcast. The podcast gained popularity quickly at launch, "largely on the back of their existing Joystiq podcast base". Grant and the McElroy's departure from Joystiq in 2012 allowed them to found the games journalism website Polygon. The McElroys also began The Besties that year, a video game talk show which included Chris Plante and Russ Frushtick from Polygon. The McElroys ultimately retired from journalism in 2018 to focus on their podcasting careers. Grant remained editor-in-chief of Polygon until 2019, and now serves as its publisher.

On February 10, 2015, the staff of Joystiq's former Massively column launched their own successor site. Massively Overpowered is dedicated to the continuation of their MMO coverage, and remains active as of 2025.

Kietzmann briefly became U.S. Editor-in-Chief for GamesRadar+, and then retired from journalism in 2016 to become the editing director for Assembly Media.

== Editors ==
The final configuration of Joystiq staff included editor-in-chief Ludwig Kietzmann, managing editor Susan Arendt, feature content director Xav de Matos, reviews content director Richard Mitchell, news content director Alexander Sliwinski, senior reporter Jess Conditt, and contributing editors Sinan Kubba, Danny Cowan, Mike Suszek and Earnest Cavalli. Thomas Schulenberg and Sam Prell maintained the blog on the weekends as the weekend editors and Anthony John Agnello served as community manager.

Previous Joystiq staff members included editor-in-chief Chris Grant, managing editor James Ransom-Wiley, features editor Kevin Kelly, reviews editor Justin McElroy, editors Griffin McElroy, J.C. Fletcher, and Mike Schramm, East Coast Editor Andrew Yoon, and West Coast Editor Randy Nelson.

== Podcasts ==
=== The Joystiq Podcast (2007–2011) ===
The Joystiq Podcast
- Genre: Podcast

Cast and voices
- Hosted by: Chris Grant, Justin McElroy, Ludwig Kietzmann

Music
- Opening theme: Gravity (Don't Let Me Go) - Jon Black
- Ending theme: Red Eye - Ben Kweller

Publication
- No. of episodes: 178 (Note: A total of 214 episodes were released, but were numbered erratically from 1 to 178. For example, in order to delay "episode 100" in 2009 so that the full cast could be present for the milestone, the preceding episodes were released as 99, 99.5, 99.75 and 99a.)
- Original release: February 6, 2007 – May 13, 2011 (Note: The holiday special was released after the end of the main run, on October 28, 2011.)
- Updates: Weekly

The Joystiq Podcast launched in 2007 and was hosted by Chris Grant, Ludwig Kietzmann and Justin McElroy. The three would discuss various gaming-related news stories. From 2009, the theme song for The Joystiq Podcast was Gravity (Don't Let Me Go) by Jon Black; the song narrates the experience of an Orbital Drop Shock Trooper (ODST) from the Halo franchise. Black was interviewed by Justin McElroy in episode 99. Some special episodes were also produced for industry events such as Game Developers Conference (GDC).

The original podcast ended in 2011, with the final episode recording livestreamed on May 12 for release on May 13. Several specials were released after that point, including two for E3 2011 and a holiday special that October. The final special episode was released a few months before McElroy and Grant departed to found Polygon. When Joystiq shut down in 2015 the episodes were not made available on Engadget, however a complete collection was uploaded to the internet archive and is freely available.

==== Segments ====
- What Have you Been Playing?: The hosts discuss games they have played in the last week.
- The Big Three: Discussion of the top three industry news items from the week.
- The Big Story: A dedicated section for major game news items, replacing The Big Three for the week.
- The Do It Line!: The hosts play often humorous voice mails left on the company phone line.
- Reader Mail: Listener submitted questions and answers.
- Brush with Fame: Call-outs to random fans from social media pages.

==== Guests ====
It would sometimes feature guests from other gaming websites such as CheapyD, Chris Remo, and Stephen Totilo. A number of other McElroy family members would appear as guests over the show's run. Justin's brother Griffin McElroy- who was also employed at Joystiq- appeared occasionally as a guest host, often to fill in for a vacant member of the core cast. Both he and their father Clint McElroy appeared in episode 100. Justin's wife Sydnee McElroy also appeared as a guest in episode 115 to answer questions about the 2009 swine flu pandemic.

==== Community projects ====
In 2008 a Facebook group for fans of the show, The Joystiq Podcast Appreciation Group, often abbreviated to the JPAG, launched their own podcast called The JPAG Show. Justin McElroy posted a short article on the subject at the launch of the spin-off, commenting "Lesser podcasts would probably be weirded out by such meta-admiration, but not us, we kind of expect it. Nay ... we demand it." The JPAG would regularly be referenced by The Joystiq Podcast, and Chris Grant made a guest appearance in episode 22. There was in tongue-in-cheek fashion also a Joystiq Podcast Appreciation Group Podcast Appreciation Group Podcast (JPAGPAG) by 2009.

=== The Joystiq Show (2011–2012) ===
The Joystiq Show
- Genre: Podcast

Cast and voices
- Hosted by: Chris Grant, Xav de Matos

Publication
- No. of episodes: 29
- Original release: June 17, 2011 – April 13, 2012
- Updates: Weekly

The Joystiq Show launched in June 2011 as a replacement for the podcast, promising a more serious, academic format, with a multifaceted examination of Duke Nukem Forever including an interview with voice actor Jon St. John and a review roundtable. Over time, the show's format evolved to include more off-the-cuff discussion, while maintaining the topical nature. The JPAG persisted beyond the cancellation of the original podcast, moved to a new website and "refused to recognise" the launch of The Joystiq Show.

=== Super Joystiq Podcast (2012–2015) ===
Super Joystiq Podcast
- Genre: Podcast

Cast and voices
- Hosted by: Xav de Matos

Publication
- No. of episodes: 128
- Original release: May 4, 2012 – January 16, 2015
- Updates: Weekly

Related
- Website: http://www.joystiq.com/tag/super-joystiq-podcast

The third and final iteration, Super Joystiq Podcast, was announced at Joystiq's PAX East 2012 panel and officially released on May 4, 2012. This podcast featured every editor, grouped together in a different configuration every week, each participating in an intro, news, preview, or "Joystiq Research Institute" segment. The intention was to move the format back towards that of the original, with conversations about the industry from the staff. The final episode, discussing The Legend of Zelda: Majora's Mask 3D, aired on January 16, 2015, several weeks before the site's closure.

== Awards ==
In 2005, Joystiq was listed at #19 of the Feedster 500. In 2007, it was also listed in Forbes.com's Best of the Web.

== See also ==
- GameDaily
