= Maximum Fun =

Podcast company and network

- Type: Podcast and radio show
- Country: United States
- Availability: Global
- Key people: Jesse Thorn; Jordan Morris; Dave Shumka; Graham Clark; Griffin McElroy
- Affiliations: National Public Radio, Public Radio International (formerly)
- Official website: www.maximumfun.org

Maximum Fun is an independent, worker-owned cooperative podcast and radio show production organization founded by Jesse Thorn. The organization originated with Thorn's college radio show The Sound of Young America which continued in an adapted format and with a new name, Bullseye with Jesse Thorn. Maximum Fun has since grown to include several other programs. Shows on the network cover a wide variety of topics.

In May 2014, Rolling Stone included three Maximum Fun shows on its list of "The 20 Best Comedy Podcasts Right Now": Judge John Hodgman, RISK!, and Throwing Shade.

== Operations ==
Maximum Fun officially converted into a worker-owned cooperative on June 30, 2023. According to Thorn, this decision was made as a result of his own burnout and as a way to avoid selling the organization to a larger company. This decision made Maximum Fun, at the time, one of the only worker-owned co-ops in media, following in the footsteps of Defector Media.

While the original management team remains in place, the co-op is now overseen by a Board of Directors made up of five worker-owners. The current Board of Directors (as of August 2024) are Jennifer Marmor, Julian Burrell, April Pendergraft, David Goldstein, and K.T. Wiegman. Founder Jesse Thorn stayed on as a worker-owner and board advisor, and is not a voting member of the Board. There are currently twenty worker-owners. All full-time employees at Maximum fun are eligible to become a worker-owner, which required a buy-in fee of "three figures". Most hosts of Maximum Fun podcasts are not full-time employees, and therefore are ineligible to join the co-op.

== Current shows ==
=== The Adventure Zone ===
The Adventure Zone is an actual play podcast in which Griffin, Justin, and Travis McElroy play Dungeons & Dragons and other role-playing games with their father, Clint.

=== Beef and Dairy Network Podcast ===
Beef and Dairy Network Podcast is a surrealist comedy podcast hosted by Benjamin Partridge, taking the form of a serious companion podcast to a fictional beef and dairy industry trade magazine relating the bizarre happenings in the aforementioned industries.

=== Bullseye with Jesse Thorn ===
Bullseye, formerly The Sound of Young America, began as an interview, talk, and sketch comedy radio show at the University of California Santa Cruz. It now follows an interview-only format and is available both as a podcast and via National Public Radio on numerous public radio stations across the United States.

=== Dead Pilots Society ===
Dead Pilots Society presents readings of television pilots that for various reasons were never produced, picked up, or aired. Before the reading, the hosts interviews the writer or writers of the script about the script and the circumstances surrounding its initial creation or production.

From the Maximum Fun website, "In Dead Pilots Society, scripts that were developed by studios and networks but were never produced are given the table reads they deserve. Starring actors you know and love from television and film, a live audience, and a good time in which no one gets notes, no one is fired, and everyone laughs. Presented by Andrew Reich (Friends; Worst Week) and Ben Blacker (The Writers Panel podcast; co-creator, Thrilling Adventure Hour)."

=== Depresh Mode with John Moe ===
Both Depresh Mode and its predecessor, The Hilarious World of Depression, aim to remove the stigma surrounding mental health through frank and sometimes funny conversations about the struggles of daily life with depression and other mental health conditions. Depresh Mode, produced in partnership with Maximum Fun, allows Moe to expand beyond depression to cover topics like burnout, obsessive-compulsive disorder and how to navigate mental health apps.

=== Dr. Gameshow ===
A podcast where Jo Firestone and Manolo Moreno play listener-submitted games with comedian friends and listener call-ins.

=== Eurovangelists ===
Eurovangelists is a weekly podcast about the Eurovision Song Contest hosted by Jeremy Bent, Oscar Montoya, and Dimitry Pompee. The hosts discuss the latest Eurovision news, rate and review the songs competing in the current Eurovision season, and do deep dives into artists and events from the history of the Contest. Glen Weldon of NPR's Pop Culture Happy Hour praised the show, saying, "On one level, this podcast is 'Eurovision 101.' And if it was just that, I'd still recommend it to people, but I probably wouldn't keep listening myself because I'm good on the basics. But it is a lot more than that: It's enthusiasts enthusing with abject sincerity, but in a knowing kind of way. They're smart. They're funny...They're sharing why they love this ridiculous spectacle without even a trace amount of gatekeeping. Everything about the podcast is specifically pitched to invite you to love Eurovision as much as they do—and as much as I do." The first episodes aired on January 18, 2024.

=== The Flop House ===
The Flop House is a bi-weekly film review podcast hosted by Elliott Kalan, Dan McCoy, and Stuart Wellington. The hosts watch a "questionable" movie before each episode and then discuss its merits and shortcomings. It became part of the Maximum Fun network on September 29, 2014.

=== Free With Ads ===
Free With Ads is a weekly film review podcast hosted by Jordan Morris, Emily Fleming and Matt Lieb. The hosts watch a film that is available for free on any streaming service available in the United States. The review consists of a plot rundown, production details and deep dives on character actors. Common segments include identifying the "Oldest Teen", "The Worst Hat" and "Tallest Guy". It was announced as part of the Maximum Fun network on February 22, 2024.

=== Go Fact Yourself ===
Go Fact Yourself is a trivia game show podcast hosted by J. Keith van Straaten and co-hosted by Helen Hong. Each show features two guests that compete in a variety of trivia rounds, including a topic they choose for themselves.

=== International Waters ===
International Waters (formerly Troubled Waters) pits two teams of comedians compete against each other in order to settle their meaningless debates once and for all. The show originated as a comedy panel game hosted by Dave Holmes. The show features comedians from the US competing against UK-based comedians by answering questions about pop culture. Points are awarded for correct answers as well as for funny incorrect answers. The show was originally hosted by Jesse Thorn.

=== Jordan, Jesse, Go! ===
A talk podcast where hosts Jesse Thorn and Jordan Morris and usually a guest provide a comedic take on a variety of topics. The podcast's all time number one guest by appearances is "Big Time" Gene O'Neill.

=== Judge John Hodgman ===
Stemming from a popular segment on Jordan, Jesse, Go!, Judge John Hodgman debuted as a standalone Maximum Fun podcast in November 2010. Hodgman serves as judge and jury, hearing cases brought by listeners on topics ranging from which kind of soap goes in the dispenser on the sink to whether a high schooler is responsible for the theft of a life-sized Ernie doll that he had previously stolen. Jesse Thorn serves as the "bailiff", though this role is occasionally filled by guest bailiffs when Jesse is preoccupied.

=== Let's Learn Everything! ===
Let's Learn Everything! is a science podcast hosted by Dr. Ella Hubber, Tom Lum, and Caroline Roper. The first episode came out on the 4th of October 2021. Initially produced independently, the podcast was picked up by Maximum Fun starting with its 23rd episode. In the initial episodes, the hosts discussed a science topic, answered a question and discussed a miscellaneous topic. However, since the 55th episode there has only been a science topic and a miscellaneous topic.

=== Maximum Film ===
Maximum Film is a spin-off of retired Maximum Fun podcast Wham Bam Pow, hosted by Ify Nwadiwe and with regular panel members Drea Clark and Alonso Duralde. The podcast features discussion of recent hit films through a racially diverse lens with rotating guests. Former regular panel members include host Ricky Carmona and April Wolfe.

=== Mission to Zyxx ===
A longform improv science fiction space opera radio drama that parodies various science fiction media properties. The cast are veteran comedians from groups like the Upright Citizens Brigade, and the show was co-created by Allie Kokesh, Alden Ford, Winston Noel, Moujan Zolfaghari, Jeremy Bent and Seth Lind, a staff member on This American Life and Serial. The plot concerns a motley crew of ambassadors, and each week a comedian guest appears and helps to shape that week's story. All improvised references are subsequently incorporated into the show's mythos. Guest stars have included Sasheer Zamata, Jon Gabrus, Alison Becker, Lennon Parham, and Bobby Moynihan. The series finale premiered in September 2022.

=== My Brother, My Brother and Me ===
On January 17, 2011, Jesse Thorn announced the addition of My Brother, My Brother and Me to the Maximum Fun family. The show is a comedy program that poses as an advice podcast, hosted by real-life brothers Justin, Travis, and Griffin McElroy. Over the course of the show, the brothers answer questions which listeners have written in, asking the brothers for their advice on difficult situations that they find themselves in. The show often contains non-advice related segments, notably 'Munch Squad,' described as a "podcast within a podcast," which features Justin satirically reviewing fast-food industry press releases. Prior to the discontinuation of the service in 2021, the brothers also answered questions from Yahoo! Answers, which were also submitted by listeners. Since the discontinuation, the brothers have reviewed listener-submitted articles from WikiHow, though this segment has appeared on the podcast with decreasing frequency.

=== Reading Glasses ===
Reading Glasses is a weekly podcast hosted by Brea Grant and Mallory O'Meara. It discusses tips and tricks for reading better, like how to vanquish that To-Be-Read pile and organize those bookshelves, climbing out of a reading slump, and supporting authors while still getting books on the cheap.

=== Sawbones ===
Sawbones, "a marital tour of misguided medicine", is a podcast hosted by Sydnee McElroy, a physician, and her husband Justin McElroy, who is also a co-host of My Brother, My Brother, and Me. The weekly show is a humorous exploration of medical history, focusing on the many ways the medical community has been wrong in the past. It premiered on the Maximum Fun network on June 21, 2013, with an episode about trepanation.

=== Secretly Incredibly Fascinating ===
Secretly Incredibly Fascinating is a weekly podcast hosted by Alex Schmidt and Katie Goldin that dives into topics that have a fascinating history. Topics include Lorem Ipsum, Silica Gel Packets and Ranch dressing. This is a podcast for people who like history, science, comedy and seeing their world a whole new way. Secretly Incredibly Fascinating is a top pick of The New York Times, Apple Podcasts, The A.V. Club, Lifehacker, Upworthy, and more. Schmidt, Goldin, and Robin Ince did a live episode of the podcast at the 2024 London Podcast Festival. Host Alex Schmidt is a comedy writer, Jeopardy! champion, viral TikToker, and the creator of the bison emoji. Co-host Katie Goldin also hosts the "Creature Feature" podcast, created the "@ProBirdRights" social media character, helped coin the "birb" Internet slang, and covered lizard mating strategies for the New York Times.

=== Shmanners ===
Shmanners is a weekly podcast hosted by Travis McElroy (of My Brother, My Brother and Me) and his wife, Teresa McElroy. The show focuses on teaching proper manners and etiquette, as well as the history behind various social guidelines. The podcast was launched in January 2016.

=== Sound Heap with John-Luke Roberts ===
John-Luke Roberts plays the CEO and "Fun Captain" of a fictional podcast network Sound Heap, which contains an endless catalogue of show. The show acts presents samples of the shows available on the network acting as a "podcast of infinite podcasts". Sound Heap was co-created with producer Ed Morrish and joined Maximum Fun in 2024.

=== Still Buffering ===
Still Buffering is a weekly podcast hosted by real-life sisters Sydnee McElroy (of Sawbones) and Rileigh Smirl, with their other sibling Teylor Smirl becoming a regular co-host in later episodes. The show focuses on experiences and issues faced by teenagers, comparing and contrasting those of current teen Rileigh with her older siblings' memories of their own teenage years. The show was first launched on Maximum Fun in January 2016. In 2020, the show was retooled to instead focus on the siblings analyzing pop culture and media that influenced each of them as teenagers.

=== Stop Podcasting Yourself ===
Stop Podcasting Yourself is a weekly comedy podcast hosted by Graham Clark and Dave Shumka. Each week the comedy duo invites a guest onto the program for a conversational interview. It is sometimes referred to by its acronym—pronounced "spy"—and its listeners are referred to as "bumpers" after Dave mistakenly referred to the audience that way in episode 1.

=== Tights and Fights ===
Tights and Fights is a weekly professional wrestling podcast hosted by Hal Lublin, Danielle Radford, Open Mike Eagle and Lyndsey Kelk, and produced by Julien Burell. They wrap up the week in wrestling focusing on the storylines of WWE, as well as highlighting some of their favourite things in wrestling. In a 2017 article, The Comeback stated: "These are people who genuinely enjoy pro wrestling from a storytelling perspective, but who also want to dig into what's going on behind the scenes and off-screen as well."

=== Triple Click ===
Triple Click is a podcast hosted by Kirk Hamilton, Maddy Myers, and Jason Schreier, the former hosts of Kotaku's podcast Splitscreen. Every week, they discuss video-game related topics.

=== TV Chef Fantasy League ===
A Fantasy League based on the results of competitive TV cooking shows. Hosted by Mike Cabellon, Sierra Katow, and Ify Nwadiwe

=== Valley Heat ===
Scripted narrative by Christian Duguay about a freelance insurance adjuster Doug Duguay investigating suspicious activity around the Rancho Equestrian District of Burbank, California.

=== Walking' About ===
An interview podcast by Allan McLeod recorded live during walks in public spaces.

=== We Got This with Mark & Hal ===
We Got This is a comedic debate-style podcast hosted by Thrilling Adventure Hour alumni Hal Lublin and Mark Gagliardi. In it suggestions are given for topics of discussion via social media, and the two hosts (And occasionally a special guest.) engage in an episode-long debate before reaching a final agreement meant to (jokingly) settle the argument permanently. Topics have ranged from "Best or Worst" scenarios (ex: "Best Halloween Candy", "Worst Christmas Song", "Best Season") to debates focused singularly on two outcomes. (ex: "Calling or Texting", "Batman or Superman", "Baths or Showers") After a decision has been reached Hal Lublin closes the show with an improvised speech addressing the "People of the World" with their verdict. Occasionally the two will engage in "Clean Slate" episodes, which consist of "lightning round"-style quick takes on multiple topics they would not otherwise have enough material to make a full episode out of.

Guests on the program have included notable comedians, musicians, authors, professional wrestlers, celebrities of geek/nerd culture, and numerous others. Frequently the show will feature fellow alumni of Thrilling Adventure Hour's "WorkJuice Players" collective as well as fellow podcasters as guests. Their theme song was written and performed by musical comedian/composer Mike Phirman.

=== Wonderful! ===
Wonderful! is a weekly podcast hosted by Griffin McElroy and his wife Rachel McElroy. The podcast features the hosts discussing a diverse assortment of things they love, with showcases of submitted topics that listeners are excited about. The podcast launched September 6, 2017, as a replacement for Rose Buddies.

== Limited series ==
=== The Art of Process with Aimee Mann and Ted Leo ===
Released every other week of 2019, singer-songwriters Aimee Mann and Ted Leo interview musician and artists about their creative process.

=== Bubble ===
Bubble is a scripted science fiction comedy that premiered June 13, 2018. From the Maximum Fun website, "Welcome to Fairhaven, a literal Bubble of corporate utopia set amid the wild, goblin-infested Brush. The first scripted comedy series from Maximum Fun, Bubble tells a tale that is both contemporary and otherworldly, as a small band of monster killers struggles to make ends meet and find love in a nightmarish version of the gig economy."

Starring: Alison Becker (Parks and Recreation), Keith Powell (30 Rock), Cristela Alonzo (Cristela), Eliza Skinner (The Late Late Show) and Mike Mitchell (Love), with appearances by Judy Greer, John Hodgman, Martin Starr, Paul F. Tompkins, and many more.

=== I, Podius ===
On each Episode of I, Podius, the hosts John Hodgman and Elliott Kalan discussed an episode of the 1970s BBC miniseries I, Claudius. They also interviewed several cast members of the miniseries. Originally a bonus podcast for donors of Maximum Fun, it was released publicly on a weekly basis from February 2020 to May 2020.

=== Magic Lessons with Elizabeth Gilbert ===
Author Elizabeth Gilbert provides advice based on her book Big Magic.

=== Round Springfield ===
Round Springfield is a Simpsons-adjacent 20-episode limited series podcast hosted by Allie Goertz and Julia Prescott. The hosts interview writers, directors, showrunners, and voice-actors from the Simpsons-verse on their various paths to Springfield—failed pilots, other projects, and beyond. Notable guests include David X. Cohen, Josh Weinstein, and Yeardley Smith.

The show was reformatted from the original podcast Everything's Coming Up Simpsons, a weekly show where the hosts interview comics, writers, animators and show creators about their favorite episode of The Simpsons. The show joined the network in March 2018.

=== The Turnaround ===
The Turnaround was a series where Jesse Thorn interviewed other professional interviewers to gain insight into interviews and "how and why they do what they do." Guests included Katie Couric, Ira Glass, and Werner Herzog. The series ran from June 2017 to January 2018.

=== The Outer Reach: Stories from Beyond ===
The Outer Reach was a limited scifi anthology series meant to imitate the style of science fiction of the 50s and 60s. Originally a bonus feed for donors of Maximum Fun, it was released publicly on May 8, 2020.

== Retired programs ==
=== Adam Ruins Everything ===
Adam Ruins Everything was an interview podcast hosted by Adam Conover where he talked to the experts and people who appeared on the TV show by the same name. The last episode was released in November 2017.

=== Baby Geniuses ===
Baby Geniuses was a weekly podcast hosted by comedian Emily Heller and cartoonist Lisa Hanawalt. The first episode was released on August 22, 2012, and the show joined Maximum Fun on September 29, 2014 and ran until January 2024 The show featured segments such as "Chunch Chat", "Endorse Horse", "One on Fun", "What Did I Learn", and "Butt Pics".

=== Can I Pet Your Dog? ===
Can I Pet Your Dog? is a comedy podcast on dogs originally hosted by "small dog owner" (formerly just "dog owner") Allegra Ringo, "big dog owner" (formerly "dog wanter") Renee Colvert, and producer Alexis B. Preston. The hosts discuss dogs among themselves and their guests. Allegra Ringo left the show in April 2019 and was replaced as co-host by Alexis Preston.

=== Coyle and Sharpe: The Imposters ===
This show was a series of rebroadcasts of audio comedy pranks performed and recorded by Jim Coyle and Mal Sharpe in the 1960s. Coyle and Sharpe met in 1959 in a San Francisco boarding house and hatched a plan to make a living performing pranks. Using a hidden tape recorder, they recorded themselves doing comedic interviews with people on the streets of San Francisco. Some of these recordings were released by Warner Bros. Records as an LP. The duo also had a nightly radio show on KGO Radio. Many of the recordings were preserved by Mal Sharpe's daughter, Jennifer Sharpe, and these form the basis of the podcast. Maximum Fun released 100 episodes of the show from March 2007 to September 2010.

=== The Dave Hill Goodtime Hour ===
A weekly podcast recorded live every Monday at 8pm ET on Twitch, hosted by comedian Dave Hill alongside producers/sidekicks James "Dez" Fernandez and Chris Gersbeck, similar to Hill's former WFMU radio show The Goddamn Dave Hill Show.

=== Dave Hill's Podcasting Incident ===
From the Maximum Fun website: "This incredible podcast features comedian/musician/writer/actor/artist/man-about-town/thinking man Dave Hill sitting down and having a delightful conversation with various notable people, including but not limited to fellow comedians, musicians, actors, authors, supermodels, convicts and whoever else he can talk into it." The podcast has since been revived by Hill as an independently produced show.

=== FANTI ===
FANTI was a weekly podcast where journalists Tre'vell Anderson and Jarrett Hill bring their pop culture and political expertise to things they enjoy and stand up against. The first episode aired on February 6, 2020 and ran until January 2024.

=== Friendly Fire ===
Friendly Fire was a weekly war movie review podcast hosted by John Roderick, Adam Pranica and Benjamin Ahr Harrison. The podcast launched on January 12, 2018. It went on a brief hiatus in January 2021 following controversial comments made by Roderick on Twitter, before announcing it would not be returning.

=== Heat Rocks ===
Heat Rocks is a podcast co-hosted by film and TV music supervisor Morgan Rhodes and music critic and historian Oliver Wang in which the pair invite a different guest each week to talk about one of the guest's favorite albums. Beginning in 2017, the podcast has covered albums in many genres of popular music including hip hop, soul, R&B, synth pop, funk, disco, punk rock, folk, bossa nova and jazz, often avoiding the typical canon of critic faves and hits in favor of more slept-on cult favorites. Heat Rocks also included special episodes on soundtracks, sampling culture and feminist icons. A few artists have received more than one episode devoted to their music. Prince is the artist most often covered on the podcast, with six albums covered. Guests on the podcast range from musicians and artists to journalists and academics. Artists such as Meshell Ndegeocello, Ali Shaheed Muhammad and Nite Jewel have guested on Heat Rocks.

=== Inside Pop ===
From Maximum Fun website: "Inside Pop is the weekly podcast that dives deep inside the world of pop culture. Television producers Amita Patel and Sean David Johnson bring their knowledge of the entertainment industry and their passion for pop culture to cover the stories you need to know about and care about. Together this dynamic duo brings a welcome diversity (they are African American and Indian American; Male and Female, Gay and Straight, Married and Single and wannabe residents of Sunnydale, CA and Dillon, TX) into the pop culture podcasting landscape."

=== The Kasper Hauser Podcast ===
Selections of sketch comedy performed by the Kasper Hauser comedy group.

=== Minority Korner ===
Minority Korner is a discussion of pop culture, politics, and nostalgia through the lens of race, gender, and queer experiences. It's hosted by Nnekay FitzClarke and James Arthur, with new episodes released every Friday.

=== Oh No, Ross and Carrie! ===
Oh No, Ross and Carrie! joined the Maximum Fun network in January 2014. The hosts, Ross Blocher and Carrie Poppy, personally investigate claims about spirituality, fringe science, religion, and the paranormal, then discuss their findings on the show. They have investigated a number of religious groups, fringe science claims, and alternative medicine modalities, including Mormonism, dowsing, and Reiki healing. The motto of the podcast is "We show up so you don't have to."

=== One Bad Mother ===
One Bad Mother is a weekly podcast hosted by Theresa Thorn and Biz Ellis. It is a comedy podcast about the realities of parenting. Episodes typically feature an interview with a guest on a specific topic. Additionally, each episode has a segment called Genius and Fails where Biz and Theresa share their parenting wins and failures from the week. Listeners call into a hotline to leave their own genius moments, fails, or rants. The episodes end with the listener rants in the Mom Having a Breakdown segment.

=== Pop Rocket ===
Pop Rocket was a discussion of pop culture hosted by comedian Guy Branum developed as a chat show counterpart to Bullseye with Jesse Thorn. The regular panel included Wynter Mitchell, Karen Tongson, and Margaret Wappler. Combining comic, journalistic, academic and digital media expertise, the Pop Rocket team discussed what's most exciting in pop culture that week. Generally the panel explores issues with diversity, feminism, sociology and provide music recommendations called "That's My Jam" and select topics "I'm All About..." of what they were most interested in from the prior week. In May 2019, Pop Rocket ceased production due to the departures of host Guy Branum and panelist Margaret Wappler, declining listenership, and production costs.

=== Rendered ===
Rendered, hosted and produced by Julie Sabatier, was a monthly public radio show and podcast about "do it yourself" culture and creativity. Rather than a how-to show of DIY projects, Rendered (formerly "Destination DIY") centered around creative people as well as the processes and resources used to create various skills, communities, and ideas. The shows featured in-studio interviews, recorded sounds from the field, and narration. It was distributed by Public Radio Exchange to several public radio stations in the US. The podcast was added to the Maximum Fun network on September 29, 2014. Rendered retired from publication on August 31, 2015.

=== Rose Buddies ===
Rose Buddies was a weekly podcast hosted by Griffin McElroy (of My Brother, My Brother and Me) and his wife Rachel McElroy. The show featured the hosts recapping and discussing the most recent episodes of the television series The Bachelor, along with spinoff series such as The Bachelorette and Bachelor in Paradise. The podcast originally premiered in January 2016, later joining Maximum Fun in January 2017. Rose Buddies retired from publication on August 30, 2017, and was replaced with Wonderful!

=== Story Break ===
Story Break was a weekly podcast hosted by Freddie Wong, Matt Arnold, and Will Campos, each episode the three constructed a hypothetical movie or TV show from various influences such as video games, breakfast cereals or board games. The podcast launched on November 17, 2017 and aired its last episode on October 8, 2021.

=== The Sound of Young America: The College Years ===
The Sound of Young America was a college radio show on KZSC, the college radio station at the University of California, Santa Cruz. The show was co-hosted by Jesse Thorn, Jordan Morris, and Jim Real (the "Master of Would You Rather"). The show included serious pieces (often interviews with comedians) and less serious banter and comedy bits. The more serious elements were included in the subsequent "The Sound of Young America" podcast, now the Bullseye with Jesse Thorn radio program distributed by NPR and available as a podcast. The less serious parts of the show were later resurrected as the Jordan Jesse, GO podcast.

=== Switchblade Sisters ===
A podcast hosted by April Wolfe providing deep dives into genre (i.e., horror, science fiction, exploitation) films from a female perspective. Each episode provided a conversation between film critic April Wolfe and a woman working as a writer, actor, and/or director in the film industry. The show ended on 25th of February 2021.

=== Trends Like These ===
Trends Like These was a weekly podcast hosted by Travis McElroy (of My Brother My Brother and Me and others), Brent Black, and writer Courtney Enlow in which the three spent each episode discussing and analyzing various topics and stories trending on online social media. The podcast was launched in May 2015, and later joined the Maximum Fun network in February 2016. The final episode aired in April 2020.

== Former programs ==
=== Bunker Buddies with Andie and Ben ===
Bunker Buddies with Andie and Ben is a comedy survival podcast hosted by comedian Andie Bolt and gear/tech expert Ben Ellis. Ellis had previously appeared as a guest on the show, and replaced Travis McElroy as the co-host in 2018. The hosts discuss survival strategies for "every single Apocalyptic scenario" they can think of. The show left Maximum Fun to be independently produced in 2019.

=== Getting Curious with Jonathan Van Ness ===
Getting Curious is a podcast where Jonathan Van Ness follows his varied interests into topics like menstrual cups, lupus, modeling, and mass extinction by talking to experts in those fields. The show premiered in 2015 and was retired from Maximum Fun on March 3, 2017. The show has since moved to Earwolf.

=== The Goosedown ===
The Goosedown hosted by comedians Kimberly Clark and Jasper Redd places an African-American spin on pop culture past and present. They are no longer on Maximum Fun.

=== The Greatest Generation / Greatest Trek ===
The Greatest Generation is a weekly comedy podcast in which hosts Adam Pranica and Benjamin Harrison describe and review episodes of Star Trek: The Next Generation, Star Trek: Deep Space Nine, Star Trek: Voyager, and Star Trek: Enterprise.

A spin-off of The Greatest Generation, Greatest Trek (named The Greatest Discovery from 2016 to 2022) is a comedy podcast in which hosts Adam Pranica and Benjamin Harrison describe and review Star Trek: Discovery, Star Trek: Picard, Star Trek: Lower Decks, Strange New Worlds and Star Trek: Starfleet Academy. The podcast left the network in April 2026.

=== Jonah Raydio ===
Jonah Raydio is a music podcast hosted by Jonah Ray. The show was initially part of the Nerdist podcast network, joined Maximum Fun in 2018, and left in 2019 to help launch short lived Sklarbro Country podcast network.

=== Lady to Lady ===
Lady to Lady is a podcast hosted by comedians Barbara Gray, Brandie Posey, and Tess Barker. Each week, Barbara, Brandie, and Tess, are joined by a guest for an unfiltered session of sleepover games, pop culture discussion, and hilarious admissions. Each episode ends with the earnest advice segment "Lady Problems". They are now hosted by Exactly Right Media.

=== The Memory Palace ===
The Memory Palace is a monthly historical podcast hosted by Nate DiMeo. The show joined Maximum Fun in July 2012. The show became independent in early 2015 and joined Radiotopia in June 2015.

=== Nobody Listens to Paula Poundstone ===
Nobody Listens to Paula Poundstone is an advice show where comedian Paula Poundstone, co-host Adam Felber, and guests use their unique comedic sensibilities to help navigate life in the 21st century. The show debuted on Maximum fun in 2018 and left in December 2019 to join Starburns Audio.

=== Risk! ===
Risk! is a weekly podcast and live storytelling show hosted by writer and actor Kevin Allison. The show's official website describes Risk! as a place "where people tell true stories they never thought they'd dare to share in public". RISK! started as a weekly live storytelling series in August 2009 and the podcast is currently independently produced by Kevin Allison.

=== Throwing Shade ===
Throwing Shade is a weekly comedy podcast centered around discussions of pop culture, politics, gay rights, and issues important to women, hosted by Erin Gibson (a.k.a. "Feminasty") and Bryan Safi (a.k.a. "Homosensual"). Gibson and Safi are "equal-opportunity offenders", and their comedic repartee frequently features adult topics and a politically incorrect sense of humor, even as they explore serious cultural and political issues. The podcast launched on November 9, 2011, and on March 5, 2012, it was announced that Throwing Shade was joining the Maximum Fun podcast network. The podcast left the network in June 2017 and has since moved to the Earwolf network.

== Other projects ==
Begun in 2009, MaxFunCon is an annual weekend convention where fans of Maximum Fun can spend time with Maximum Fun hosts and other celebrities held in Lake Arrowhead, CA. In fall 2012 MaxFunCon East was offered in the Poconos. The Atlantic Ocean Comedy and Music Festival (also known as boatparty.biz) was held in summer 2013 in lieu of Max Fun Con East.

Begun in 2011, the JoCo Cruise is an annual week-long cruise started by Jesse Thorn and other Maximum Fun hosts and artists. Festivities include live concerts from artists like Jonathan Coulton, comedy performances, and gaming.
