= Clint McElroy =

American writer, podcaster, and radio broadcaster (born 1955)

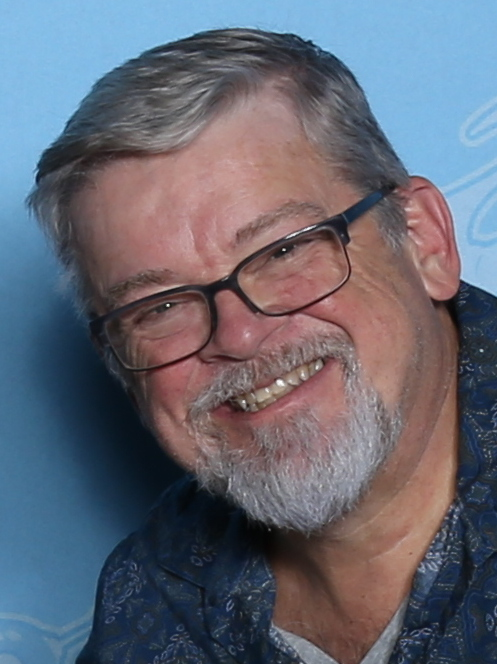
- McElroy at GalaxyCon Louisville in 2019
- Born: August 10, 1955 (age 70)
- Occupations: Podcaster, comic book writer, radio personality
- Years active: 1975–present
- Notable work: The Adventure Zone
- Spouses: Leslie McElroy (m. 1977; died 2005) Carol McElroy (m. 2010)
- Children: 3: Justin, Travis, Griffin

Clinton Emil McElroy Jr. (/ˈmæk.əlˌrɔɪ/ MACK-əl-roy, born August 10, 1955) is an American podcaster, comic book writer and former radio personality. He is known for his work on the podcast The Adventure Zone, as well as for hosting several FM radio shows in West Virginia. Additionally, McElroy is an adjunct professor in the Department of Theatre at Marshall University.

== Career ==
=== Radio ===
Clint McElroy is an alumnus of Marshall University, at which he worked with campus radio station WMUL. He then worked as news director at WKEE-FM in 1975, followed by roles at WRVC and WEMM-FM, as well as a sports director role at WWBA in Florida. Beginning in 1994, he co-hosted the morning show at WTCR-FM, along with co-host Judy Eaton. In 2017, he retired from radio.

=== Podcasting ===
Clint McElroy, his sons and their wider relations have been nicknamed the "first family of podcasting", owing to their large volume of work and the popularity of their various podcasts. Clint McElroy refers his work in the format as a natural extension of his work in radio, where would occasionally perform on-air skits with his children. He first appeared as a guest on The Joystiq Podcast in 2009. For the 100th episode, he was called up live on air to tell an embarrassing story about his son, co-host of the show, Justin McElroy.

In 2014, Clint McElroy and his sons – Justin, Travis, and Griffin – launched a tabletop role-playing game podcast entitled The Adventure Zone. Initially playing Dungeons & Dragons, the show moved into other game systems in later arcs. Clint acted as Game Master during the 'experimental' campaign Commitment, which made use of the Fate system. During the first arc, Balance, Clint portrayed Merle Highchurch, a dwarf cleric. In the second campaign, Amnesty, he portrayed Ned Chicane, and later Arlo Thacker. For the show's third campaign, Graduation, he portrayed Argo Keene, a water genasi rogue. In the fourth campaign, Ethersea, he portrayed Zoox, a Brinarr ranger. In the fifth campaign, Steeplechase, he portrayed Emerich Dreadway. In the sixth campaign, “Versus Dracula”, he portrayed Brother Phileaux, an artificer.

In 2018, Clint McElroy appeared as a guest star on Adventure Impractical as part of the Stream of Many Eyes, a Dungeons & Dragons event promoting the new Waterdeep storyline. He also appeared at the following year's event, The Descent.

In 2020, Clint McElroy appeared as a guest voice in Sidequesting.

Amid the COVID-19 pandemic in 2020, Clint began the daily YouTube series Stories from Your Gaffer, in which he reads chapters from books, in lieu of bedtime stories for his grandchildren. He began with The Hobbit, though had to switch to The Wonderful Wizard of Oz for copyright reasons. Neil Gaiman granted permission for his books, and so Clint then moved on to Coraline.

=== Comics ===
Clint wrote several comic books for NOW Comics in the early 1990s, such as Green Hornet: Dark Tomorrow and adaptations of the movies Freejack and Universal Soldier. He also wrote for Eclipse Comics with Blood is the Harvest in 1992. This was among the final comics printed by the group, which ceased operation in 1994.

Beginning with Here There Be Gerblins in 2018, Clint McElroy co-wrote a series of graphic novel adaptations of The Adventure Zone: Balance, releasing one volume each summer. The four volumes released to date were highly successful, becoming New York Times bestsellers.

Along with his sons, Clint co-wrote Journey into Mystery, a five-part limited series as part of Marvel's War of the Realms storyline. Alongside this, McElroy would work on Marvel Team-up #4 that year.

== Personal life and family ==
Clint McElroy is the great nephew of Hugh McElroy, the chief purser aboard the RMS Titanic.

He spent his early years in Ironton, Ohio, where he attended Ironton High School and eventually Ohio University Southern Campus and then Marshall University, located in Huntington, West Virginia.

He married Leslie Gail McElroy (née Kitchen) in 1977. They had three children: Justin, Travis, and Griffin. Leslie died in 2005. McElroy remarried in 2010. He has one stepdaughter.

== Works ==
- Freejack, NOW Comics, 1992
- Universal Soldier, NOW Comics, 1992
- Blood Is the Harvest, Eclipse Comics, 1992
- The Green Hornet vol. 2, #10, 23, NOW Comics, 1992
- The Green Hornet: Dark Tomorrow, NOW Comics, 1993
- 3 Ninjas Kick Back, NOW Comics, 1994
- The Adventure Zone: Here There Be Gerblins, First Second Books, 2018
- War of the Realms: Journey into Mystery, Marvel, 2019
- Marvel Team-Up vol. 4, #4–6, Marvel, 2019
- The Adventure Zone: Murder on the Rockport Limited!, First Second Books, 2019
- Marvel Comics #1001, Marvel, 2019 (limited 80th anniversary series)
- The Adventure Zone: Petals to the Metal, First Second Books, 2020
- The Adventure Zone: The Crystal Kingdom, First Second Books, 2021
- Sonic the Hedgehog 30th Anniversary Special ("Sonic Learns to Drive"), 2021
- Goldie's Guide to Grandchilding, First Second Books, 2022 (picture book)
- The Adventure Zone: The Eleventh Hour, First Second Books, 2023
- The Adventure Zone: The Suffering Game, First Second Books, 2024

== Awards and achievements ==
In 2009, Clint McElroy was inducted into the Greater Huntington Wall of Fame, in recognition of his contributions to local radio as well as local theater.

In 2021, a newly discovered species of millipede was named Nannaria mcelroyorum in recognition of the McElroy family's podcasts, which entertained the scientists during their field work. The millipede is found in West Virginia as well as the wider Appalachian region.
