= List of fantasy podcasts =

The following is a list of fantasy podcasts. The list contains podcasts that have been explicitly categorized as fantasy by reliable secondary sources that demonstrate each podcast's notability. The type of release can be either episodic or serial. The delivery of each podcast can vary significantly from a fully scripted audio drama to an entirely improvised skit. Other styles include conversational, interview, or narrated short stories. The contents of each podcast can vary from stories of fiction to nonfiction discussions revolving around fiction in media.

== List ==
Podcast	Year	Style	Starring, Narrator(s), or Host(s)	Produced by	Ref
Alba Salix, Royal Physician	2014–present	Audio drama, audio play, audio fiction, or scripted	Barbara Clifford, Julian Sark, and Olivia Jon	Fable and Folly Productions	
Clarkesworld Magazine (Note: Fiction from the magazine is available in audio format.)	2008–present	Narrated Short Stories or Prose	Kate Baker and Mary Robinette Kowal	Clarkesworld	
Critical Role (Note: Web series with a podcast adaptation.)	2017–present	Improvised, Role-play, or Actual Play	Matthew Mercer, Brennan Lee Mulligan, Critical Role cast	Critical Role Productions	
Dark Dice	2018–present	Improvised, Role-play, or Actual Play	Travis Vengroff, Kaitlin Statz, Jeff Goldblum	Fool and Scholar Productions	
Flyest Fables	2018–present	Narration and audio drama	Morgan Givens	Independent	
Friends at the Table	2014–present	Audio drama, audio play, audio fiction, or scripted	Austin Walker	Independent	
Hello from the Magic Tavern	2015–present	Improvised, Role-play, or Actual Play	Arnie Niekamp, Matt Young, and Adal Rifai	Earwolf	
Imaginary Worlds	2014–present	Nonfiction, discussion, critique, news, or review	Eric Molinsky	Independent	
Inn Between	2018–2024	Audio drama, audio play, audio fiction, or scripted	Marquis Dijon Archuleta, Kaleigh Christopher, Riley Jones, Kira Mills, and Austin Mowat	Independent	
Jarnsaxa Rising	2018	Audio drama, audio play, audio fiction, or scripted	Ethan Bjelland, Anissa Siobhan Brazill, Katherine Kupiecki, Marylynn Mennicke	6630 Productions	
Join the Party	2017–present	Improvised, Role-play, or Actual Play	Eric Silver, Brandon Grugle, Amanda McLoughlin, and Julia Schifini	Multitude	
Kalila Stormfire's Economical Magick Services	2017–present	Audio drama, audio play, audio fiction, or scripted	Lisette Alvarez	Stormfire Productions	
Love and Luck	2017–present	Audio drama, audio play, audio fiction, or scripted	Erin Kyan and Lee Davis-Thalbourne	Passer Vulpes Productions	
Marvel's Squirrel Girl: The Unbeatable Radio Show	2022	Audio drama, audio play, audio fiction, or scripted	Ryan North (writer), Giovanna Sardelli (director), and Milana Vayntrub	Radio Point, Marvel Entertainment, SiriusXM	
MOREVI: the chronicles of Rafe & Askana	2008	Audio drama, audio play, audio fiction, or scripted	Tee Morris	Podiobooks.com	
PodCastle	2007–present	Audio drama, audio play, audio fiction, or scripted	Setsu Uzume	Escape Artists	
Queer Dungeoneers	2018–present	Improvised, Role-play, or Actual Play		Independent	
Rivals of Waterdeep (Note: Web series with a podcast adaptation.)	2018–2022	Improvised, Role-play, or Actual Play		Wizards of the Coast	
Roll For Wenches	2017–2020	Improvised, Role-play, or Actual Play		Independent	
SFF Yeah!	2017–present	Nonfiction, discussion, critique, news, or review	Jenn Northington and Sharifah	Book Riot	
Speculate	2010–present	Nonfiction, discussion, critique, news, or review	Gregory A. Wilson, Bradley Beaulieu, Michael R. Underwood, Brandon O'Brien	Independent	
Supernatural Sexuality with Dr Seabrooke	2019–present	Audio drama, audio play, audio fiction, or scripted	Mama Boho	Passer Vulpes Productions	
Sword and Laser	2007–present	Nonfiction, discussion, critique, news, or review	Tom Merritt and Veronica Belmont	Independent	
Tavern Tales Junior	2017–present	Improvised, Role-play, or Actual Play		Independent	
The Adventure Zone	2014–present	Improvised, Role-play, or Actual Play	Justin, Travis, Griffin, and Clint McElroy	Maximum Fun	
The Alexandria Archives	2016–2019	Audio drama, audio play, audio fiction, or scripted	Nicole Jorge, Uri Sacharow, and Aaron Rehdactedd	Independent	
The Axe & Crown	2017–present	Audio drama, audio play, audio fiction, or scripted	Sean Howard	Fable and Folly Productions	
The BCS Audio Vault	2014–2017	Narrated Short Stories or Prose	Folly Blaine, Tina Connolly, Michael J. DeLuca, and M.K. Hobson	Beneath Ceaseless Skies Online Magazine	
The Chronicles of Wild Hollow	2020–present	Audio drama, Fantasy, Musical, Adventure, Scripted	Christian Powlesland, Heather Gourdie, Angus Maxwell, Harvey Badger, Alice E Mayer	Shouting Is Funny	
The End of Time and Other Bothers	2018–present	Improvised, Role-play, or Actual Play	Marisa King, Carter Siddall, Michael Howie, and Sean Howard	Fable and Folly Productions	
The Magical History of Knox County	2017	Audio drama, audio play, audio fiction, or scripted	Mordecai Dogwood, Ned Jones, and Abigail Redwine	Independent	
The Once and Future Nerd	2014–present	Audio drama, audio play, audio fiction, or scripted	Garrett Armyn, Dan Dobransky, Anya Gibian, Ian Harkins	Independent	
The Penumbra Podcast	2017–present	Audio drama, audio play, audio fiction, or scripted	Harley Takagi Kaner, Kevin Vibert, Kat Buckingham, Alice Chuang, and Noah Simes	Independent	
The Prickwillow Papers	2018–2019	Audio drama, audio play, audio fiction, or scripted	Maddy Searle, Lewis Robertson and David Devereux	Snazzy Tapir Productions	
The SFF Audio Podcast	2008–present	Nonfiction, discussion, critique, news, or review	Jesse Willis	SffAudio.com	
The Steamrollers Adventure podcast	2016–present	Improvised, Role-play, or Actual Play	Michael Rigg	Independent	
The Two Princes	2019–present	Audio drama, audio play, audio fiction, or scripted	Noah Galvin and Ari'el Stachel	Gimlet Media	
Victoriocity	2017–present	Audio drama, audio play, audio fiction, or scripted	Tom Crowley, Layla Katib, and Peter Rae Chris and Jen Sugden	Independent	
Welcome to Warda	2017–2019	Improvised, Role-play, or Actual Play	Aly Grauer & Drew Mierzejewski	Independent	
Words to That Effect	2017–present	Nonfiction, discussion, critique, news, or review	Conor Reid	Words To That Effect	
Worlds Beyond Number	2023–present	Improvised, Role-play, or Actual Play	Brennan Lee Mulligan, Aabria Iyengar	Fortunate Horse	
The Mysterious Secrets Of Uncle Bertie's Botanarium	2016	Audio drama, audio play, audio fiction, or scripted	Jemaine Clement	South Coast Shenanigans and Stitcher	
Third Eye	2023	Audio drama, audio play, audio fiction, or scripted	Felicia Day	Audible	
Sidequesting	2019–present	Audio drama, audio play, audio fiction, or scripted	Tal Minear	Realm	

== See also ==
- Fantasy
- Fantasy film
- Fantasy podcast
- Fantasy literature
