= Kalila Stormfire's Economical Magick Services =

Fantasy podcast

- Cover design by Kristina Lakeway
- Genre: Fantasy podcast
- Language: English

Creative team
- Created by: Lisette Alvarez
- Written by: Idris Grey; Ashley Mitchell; D. B. Wansel

Cast and voices
- Voices: Lisette Alvarez; Zayn Thiam; Whitney Johnson; Alex Christian; Chris Magilton; Sena Bryer; Anairis Quinones; Karim Kronfli; Forenza ASMR; Sam "Raethr" Nguyen

Production
- Length: 20 minutes

Publication
- No. of seasons: 3
- No. of episodes: 42
- Original release: February 1, 2018
- Updates: Bi-monthly

Related
- Related shows: Love and Luck; Alba Salix, Royal Physician; Tides
- Website: www.kalilastormfire.com

Kalila Stormfire's Economical Magick Services is a fantasy podcast about a young witch named Kalila running a business. The podcast was independently created and produced by Lisette Alvarez, a Cuban-American Queer content creator.

== Background ==
The podcast is about a witch named Kalila who has been cast out by her coven for making a mistake. Every episode is a case file discussing how she has diagnosed her patient. During the first couple episodes Kalila learns that she is being sabotaged. Lisette Alvarez is a Cuban-American. The show contains LGBT characters. Gavin Gaddis of thepodreport.com praised the show saying that "Kalila is one of the best indie audio fiction shows out there."

=== Awards ===
Award	Date	Category	Recipient	Result	Ref.
Audio Verse Awards	2020	Vocal Direction of a Production	Lisette Alvarez	Won	
Audio Verse Awards	2018	Writing of a new drama	Lisette Alvarez	Nominated	
Audio Verse Awards	2018	Writing of an ongoing short-form drama	Lisette Alvarez	Nominated	
Audio Verse Awards	2018	Best new drama	Kalila Stormfire's Economical Magick Services	Nominated	
Audio Verse Awards	2018	Best ongoing short-form drama	Kalila Stormfire's Economical Magick Services	Nominated	

== See also ==
- List of fantasy podcasts
