= Join the Party =

Actual play podcast

- Genre: Dungeons & Dragons; Role-playing game; Actual play; Fantasy podcast
- Language: English

Creative team
- Created by: Eric Silver; Brandon Grugle

Cast and voices
- Voices: Eric Silver; Brandon Grugle; Amanda McLoughlin; Julia Schifini

Music
- Theme music composed by: Brandon Grugle

Production
- Production: Brandon Grugle; Mischa Stanton
- Length: 30–60 minutes

Publication
- Original release: May 23, 2017
- Provider: Multitude

Related
- Related shows: Hello from the Magic Tavern; Critical Role; The Adventure Zone
- Website: www.jointhepartypod.com

Join the Party is a Dungeons and Dragons podcast created by Multitude and hosted by Dungeon Master Eric Silver.

== Background ==
The show features Eric Silver, Amanda McLoughlin, Brandon Grugle and Julia Schifini. The show is produced by Multitude, a podcast collective founded by Amanda McLoughlin. In July 2019, Join the Party and the four other podcasts from Multitude collectively received more than two million downloads.

The show's Dungeon Master, Eric Silver, learned about Dungeons and Dragons through other actual play podcasts and television programs. Silver has used the show as a platform to make Dungeons and Dragons easier for newcomers to learn the mechanics of the game and demonstrate how games can be used to explore real world issues. The show even provides episodes dedicated solely to helping people learn how to play. The show also provides one set of episodes for experienced players and another set of episodes that include explanations of rules and game mechanics. The show has "Afterparty" episodes where the players are provided the chance to ask the Dungeon Master questions and listeners of the show can submit questions as well. The show engages its audience by naming characters in the campaigns after fans of the show.

The storyline begins during a wedding party where the adventures learn that something has gone wrong in the world. The first season involves a warlock with knowledge of the gods, an amateur assassin, and a robot detective. The three protagonists of the story include Inara Harthorn played by Amanda McLoughlin, Johnny B. Goodlight played by Michael Fische, and TR8C played by Brandon Grugle.

Season 2 is set in the modern day with superheroes.

== Format ==
The show provides full transcripts of every campaign. Each episode of the show is about an hour long. The show uses the 5th edition of Dungeons and Dragons. The show has a Patreon account.

== Reception ==
Rohan Salmond recommended the podcast on ABC News, saying that "Join the Party is a great introduction to the genre. ... The rules are explained clearly right up front and never get in the way of the story".

== See also ==
- List of fantasy podcasts
