= Honey Heist =

One-page tabletop role-playing game

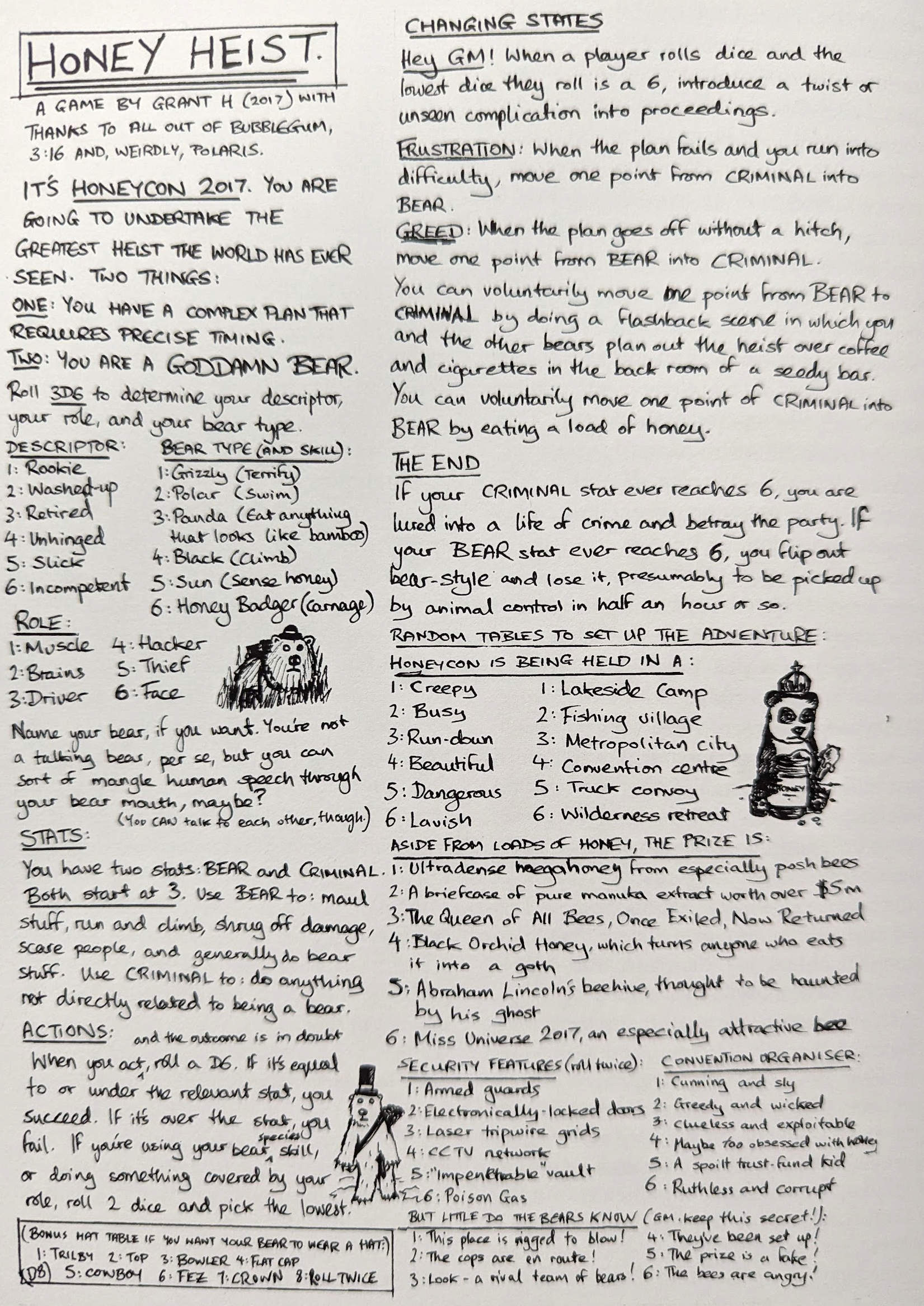
- Original one-page RPG by Grant Howitt, reproduced via Creative Commons license
- Designers: Grant Howitt
- Publication: 2017
- Genres: Simple indie role-playing game
- Skills: role-playing

Honey Heist is a very simple one-page indie role-playing game self-published by creator Grant Howitt in 2017 in which players take on the roles of disguised bears who are trying to get away with a large heist of honey.

== Description ==
The game description starts with three statements:

1. "It's Honeycon 2017. You are going to undertake the greatest heist the world has ever seen."
2. "You have a complex plan that requires precise timing."
3. "You are a goddamn Bear."

The goal of the players is to plan out and execute the perfect heist that will net them all the honey that is at Honeycon, a human convention.

=== Set-up ===
Each player randomly determines their Bear character:

- Descriptor (Rookie, Retired, Unhinged, etc.)
- Bear Type and Skill (Grizzly — Terrify, Black — Climb, Honey Badger — Carnage, etc.)
- Role (Muscle, Brains, Driver, etc.)

Players have the option of randomly determining a type of hat their bear will wear. Each player then names their bear.

While the players are creating their player characters, the gamemaster randomly determines where Honeycon is being held, what, besides a load of honey, is the prize, what the personality of the convention organizer is, the security features at the convention, and (not revealed to the player), what additional secret will happen.

=== Gameplay ===
The game mechanics are based on Lasers & Feelings by John Harper (designer of Blades in the Dark). Every Bear has two ability scores, "Bear" and "Criminal", which both start at 3. The Bear ability allows the player to do Bear actions like mauling, scaring people, etc.; and the Criminal ability allows any actions not related to Bear. Ability scores change either up or down as either successes (take one point from Bear score and move it to Criminal score) or failures (take one point from Criminal score and add to Bear score) occur. A player can voluntarily move a point of Criminal to Bear by eating some honey, or move a point of Bear to Criminal by planning the heist in the back of a seedy bar over coffee and cigarettes.

The Bears plan their heist based on information they are able to glean about the convention. Any time a Bear tries something and the outcome is in doubt, the player rolls a six-sided die against the relevant ability (Bear or Criminal). A roll over the ability score is a failure. If the player invokes their Bear's special Bear Skill, the player rolls two dice and uses the lowest.

If a character's Bear score reaches 6, the Bear goes berserk and attacks everyone and everything in sight. If the character's Criminal score reaches 6, the Bear is lured into a life of crime and betrays the party. In both of these cases, the game ends in failure.

== Publication history ==
Grant Howitt creates one-page role-playing games each month for Patreon subscribers. One such game in 2017 was Honey Heist.

== Reception ==
Honey Heist was featured in three episodes of Critical Role, one episode of Dungeons and Daddies, two episodes of Rude Tales of Magic, and a special episode of Tales from the Stinky Dragon. It has also been a top seller on Itch.io's physical games section since 2017 and inspired new indie role-playing game designers to make their own games. It also has a popular response on the Tabletop RPGs subreddit.

J. Zambrano, writing for Bell of Lost Souls, noted that it was simple to learn and easy to run.

Review Geek noted with approval the quick and easy character creation rules.

In his 2023 book Monsters, Aliens, and Holes in the Ground, RPG historian Stu Horvath noted, "If there is a perfect archetype for Howitt's one-page RPGs, my money is on Honey Heist, a heist game in which players are bears (or, in rare cases, a badger) ... It's absurd beyond any reasonable use of the word — and wonderful. Get that honey!"
