= The Once and Future Nerd =

Fantasy podcast

- Genre: Fantasy podcast
- Language: English

Creative team
- Created by: Zach Glass Christian T. Kelley-Madera
- Written by: Zach Glass; Rhiannon Angell; Anya Gibian; Ian Harkins; Shannon Harris; Gregory M. Schulz

Cast and voices
- Voices: Rhiannon Angell; Garrett Armyn; Dan Dobransky; Anya Gibian; Ian Harkins; Shannon Harris; Paul Notice; Juliet Prather; Frank Queris; Julie Reed; Gregory M. Schulz; Christian T. Kelley-Madera

Music
- Theme music composed by: Jared Paul; Tom Lee; Chris Montalbo

Production
- Production: Zach Glass; Jess Kelley-Madera; Oliver Morris; Pedro Tarrago; Sandra Ramirez
- Length: 15–45 Minutes

Publication
- Original release: September 18, 2013
- Provider: Glass & Madera

Related
- Related shows: Join the Party; Alba Salix
- Website: onceandfuturenerd.com

The Once and Future Nerd (TOAFN) is a fantasy podcast produced by Glass & Madera.

== Background ==
The show was co-written by Zach Glass and Christian Kelley-Madera. The show is a high fantasy serialized audio drama that provides commentary and real-world issues such as institutional racism and corrupt power structures. The show begins as a comedy series. The storyline follows the adventures of three teenagers from Pennsylvania who find themselves in a world full of magic. The three high schoolers' names are Billy, Jenn, and Nelson. The three protagonists find themselves in a world called "Iorden" and are caught up in the politics of a kingdom at war. The cast of characters include LGBTQ+ people and people of color.

== Format ==
The show provides transcripts for each episode. The show has a large back-catalogue of episodes. The show has a large cast of characters.

== Reception ==
In 2014, the show won the Audioverse award for "Best Ongoing Original Long-form Production of the Year" and Paul Notice won "Best Actor in an Original Ensemble Role" for his role in the show. The show won "Best Original Composition in an Original, Short-Form Production", "Best Ensemble Cast in an Original, Short-Form, Serial Production", and "Best Original Short-Form, Serial Comedy" in the 2015 Audio Verse Awards. The show was also nominated for the 2015 Geekie Awards. The show was nominated and became a finalist in the 2015 Parsec Awards.

== See also ==
- List of fantasy podcasts
