= Whirled News Tonight =

Whirled News Tonight is a weekly improvised satire that has performed since 2003 at the iO Theater in Chicago, Illinois.

== History ==
The show premiered in September, 2003 as "Whirled News Tonight presents Newspeak" but soon shortened the title. Since its premiere, they have been performing weekly on Saturday nights in The Del Close Theater at iO Chicago. Since the 2022 reopening of the theater, the show performs in the Kingsbury Theater.

A review in The Chicago Reader said "This satire of current events features players who exhibit a genuine rapport: articulate dialogue unfolds logically, swiftly, and concisely.". A feature piece in The Daily Herald said "Catch up on the latest news lampooned I.O.-style and deftly filtered through the sly sensibilities of the 'Whirled News Tonight' cast. The whip-smart improvisers craft sketches out of news stories clipped from local and national publications.". A review in Time Out Chicago said "The uncommonly witty and smart performers in this long-form improv show satirize current events by creating scenes based on articles that audience members literally rip from the week's papers."

In early 2008, Whirled News Tonight launched a free weekly Podcast that features an audio recording of their improvised performances.

In 2020, the iO Theater founded by Charla Halpern and David Shepherd closed due to the COVID-19 pandemic, temporarily halting the show. In late 2022, it was announced that Halpern had sold the iO Theater and the new owners and management had restored the theater and reopened it for shows. Since then, Whirled News Tonight has resumed its Saturday evening timeslot.

== Premise ==
As audience members enter the theater, they are invited to clip articles from newspapers and magazines and tack them to a corkboard on stage. When the show begins, performers enter dressed in professional newscaster attire and introduce the show with its motto "The News is Real, Everything Else is Improvised."

One performer reads the opening paragraphs from a randomly selected article, which the troupe uses as the inspiration for a string of improvised scenes. Soon, another random article is pulled and a new set of scenes are performed. As the show develops, characters and situations cross over into multiple scenes creating a cohesive longform improvisational piece.

== Cast ==
The show was created by Producer/Director Jason R. Chin. Since its inception, Scott Brady has been the Stage Manager.

Since the show's opening in September 2003, the resident cast of "Whirled News Tonight" has included: Emily Anderson, Atra Asdou, Becca Barish, Brooke Breit, Marla Caceres, John Patrick Coan, Simon Collier, Padraic Connelly, Luis Cortes, Alex Eilhauer, John P. Glynn, Sarah Haskins, Erin Keif, Jordan Klepper, Cynthia Kmak, Brett Lyons, Arnie Niekamp, Megan O'Neill, Eddie Piña, Sean Price, Alison Reese, Adal Rifai, Steve Waltien, Rob White, Shane Wilson, Sarah Wonak, and Matt Young.

Current cast includes: Mo Phillips-Spotts, James Dugan, Sean Price, Fiona Stephens, Lauren Williams, Cynthia Kmak and Erin Washington.

== Other projects ==
In addition to their regular weekly performances, Whirled News Tonight has appeared at the Chicago Improv Festival, The Del Close Marathon in New York City and the Piccolo Spoleto Festival in Charleston, SC. The cast was also invited to perform for Saturday Night Live talent scouts and, in 2006, partnered with NBC Universal to produce the short film "Kyle's in a Coma" for the network's online subsidiary DotComedy.

In 2004, 2008 and 2012, the cast hosted an election night special, Electopalooza, to coincide with the presidential elections. In 2008, the group also created their first sketch show leading up to the election that year titled Yes We Can't.

Several podcasts have emerged from the cast members, including Hello from the Magic Tavern in 2015 and Hey Riddle Riddle in 2018.

== Wikipedia Listing ==
In early 2008, a listing for "Whirled News Tonight" was created on Wikipedia but was soon removed following a brief discussion by site administrators who were split on the importance of such an entry. Several weeks later, author and columnist Nicholson Baker mentioned the deletion in his article "The Charms of Wikipedia" which appeared in The New York Review of Books.
