= Janet Varney =

American actress, comedian, writer and producer

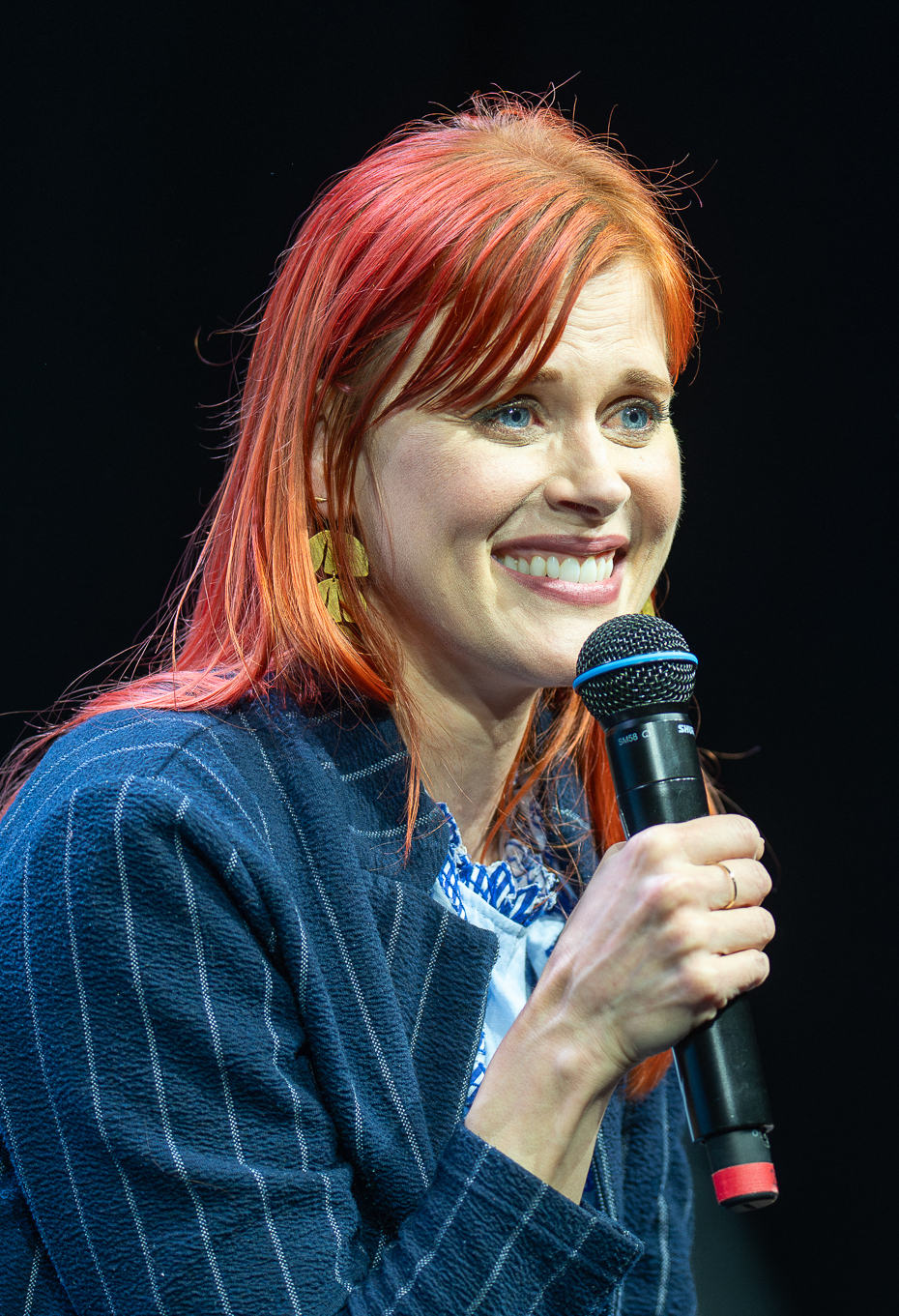
- Varney at Animate! Raleigh in 2026
- Born: Tucson, Arizona, U.S.
- Education: San Francisco State University (BA)
- Occupations: Actress; comedian; writer; producer
- Years active: 2003–present
- Website: janetvarney.com

Janet Varney is an American actress, comedian, writer and producer. She is known for voicing the character of Korra in the Nickelodeon animated television series The Legend of Korra, co-starring as Sheriff Evie Barret in the television series Stan Against Evil, and a recurring role as Becca Barbara in You're the Worst.

Varney has hosted The JV Club podcast since 2012 and is also the co-host of the Avatar: Braving the Elements podcast along with Dante Basco. She is the co-founder, creative director and producer of the long-running comedy festival SF Sketchfest in San Francisco.

== Early life ==
Varney was born and raised in Tucson, Arizona. She graduated as salutatorian from Rincon High School in 1993 and is an alumna of San Francisco State University, where she majored in theater, graduating with a Bachelor of Arts in 1997. She later pursued a career in interior design before eventually finding her way back into acting. Varney was raised Mormon, but left the church at 17 and began to identify as an agnostic. Varney is of English and Scottish descent.

== Career ==
=== Television projects ===
Varney made her television debut in 2004 as a guest on the Comedy Central debate show Crossballs. She has appeared as a guest star in series including Bones, Better Off Ted, How I Met Your Mother, Hot in Cleveland, and Psych. Varney has had recurring roles on the shows Entourage (HBO), Burning Love (Yahoo! Screen), Country Comfort (Netflix), You're the Worst (FX), and Take My Wife (Seeso).

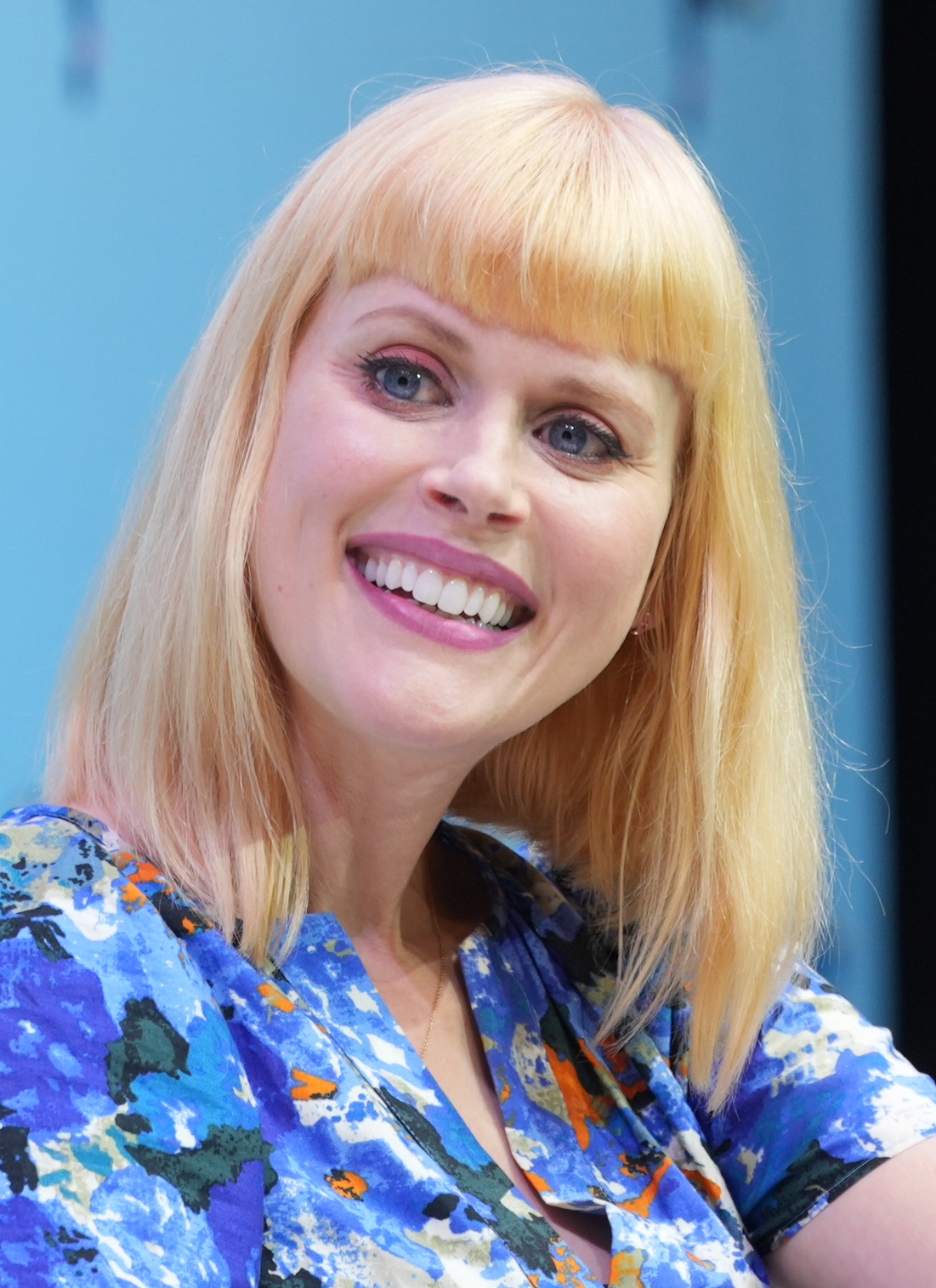
Varney at GalaxyCon Raleigh in 2024

In 2012, she co-created Neil's Puppet Dreams with Neil Patrick Harris and David Burtka. That same year, Varney also began her role voicing the main character of Korra on the Nickelodeon animated series The Legend of Korra, a spin-off of the series Avatar: The Last Airbender. Varney voiced the character of Korra for all four seasons of the show, which ended in 2014. After a decade of voicing Korra in both the series and several video games, Varney later stepped down from the role with her final outing as the character being in Nickelodeon Kart Racers 3: Slime Speedway in 2022.

In 2016, Varney was nominated for an Emmy for Outstanding Actress in a Short Form Comedy or Drama Series for her role on Everyone's Crazy But Us, a web series produced on Funny or Die.

Varney was a main cast member on IFC's Stan Against Evil, playing Sheriff Evie Barret. The show ran for three seasons from 2016 to 2018. She was also the host of ESCAPE!, a web series broadcast on Geek & Sundry where teams of celebrities work together to get out of an escape room. The show ran for one season in 2017.

In 2018 Varney created, produced and starred in Fortune Rookie, an 8-episode web series presented by IFC.

=== Dinner and a Movie ===
In 2005, Varney replaced Lisa Kushell as the host of the TBS cooking and entertainment show Dinner and a Movie. She appeared with Paul Gilmartin and Claud Mann in each episode, introducing films and injecting humor during the preparation of a creative dinner for some themes. The series was cancelled in 2011.

=== RiffTrax ===
Varney has written and performed several comedic audio commentaries for films along with fellow SF Sketchfest co-founder Cole Stratton. These appear on the RiffTrax website under the RiffTrax Presents branding, as they are officially sanctioned by RiffTrax founder and Mystery Science Theater 3000 alumnus Michael J. Nelson.

She has performed in Rifftrax commentaries for the following films:

- Footloose
- Poltergeist
- Ghost
- Dirty Dancing
- Jaws 3-D
- Flatliners
- The Lost Boys
- Dreamscape
- Batman vs Superman
- Ladyhawke

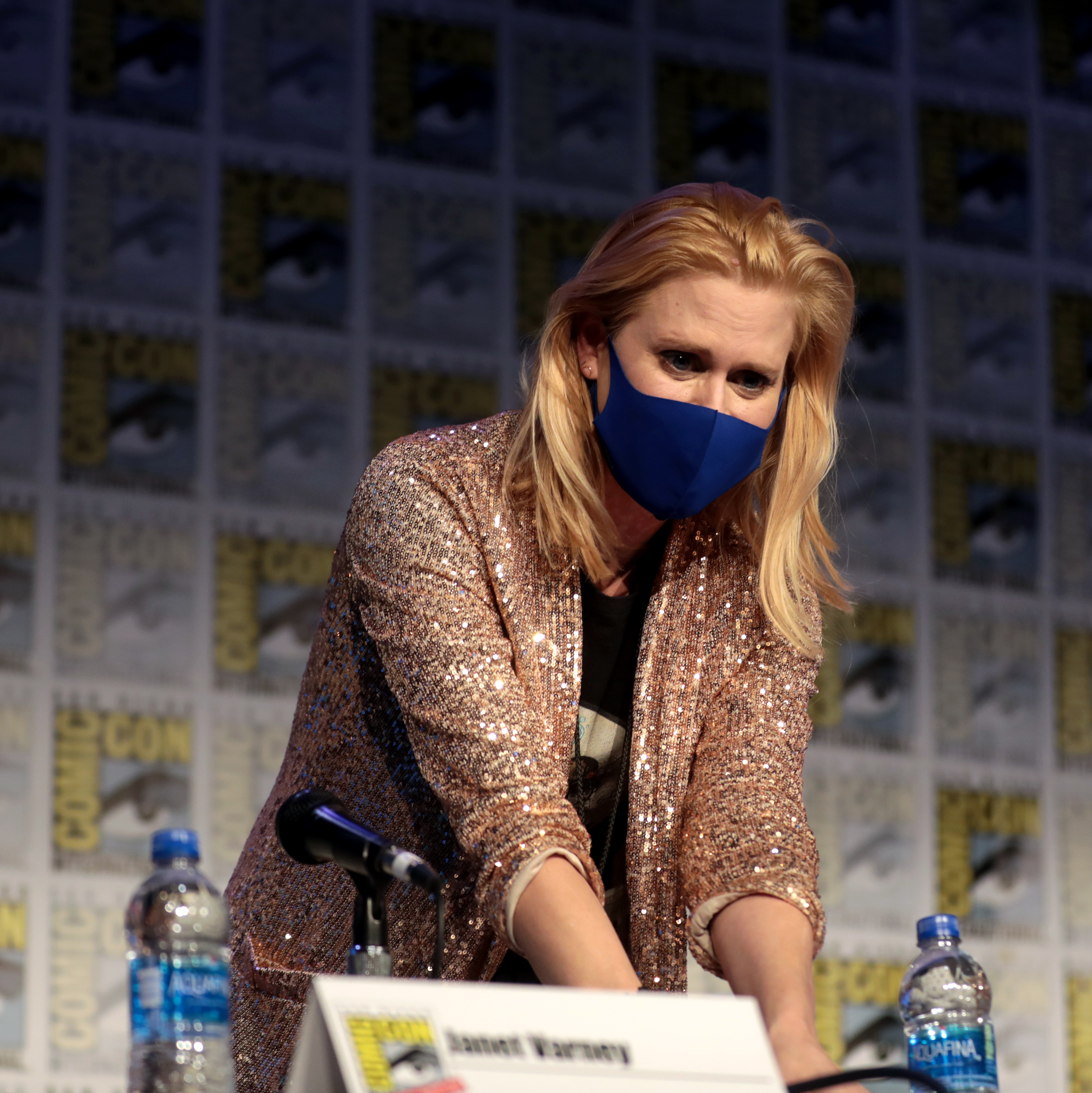
Varney at the 2021 San Diego Comic-Con

=== Podcasts ===
In March 2012, Varney launched a podcast titled The JV Club, hosted on Nerdist.com from 2012 to 2018. In November 2018, it was announced that The JV Club would be moving to the Maximum Fun network. The podcast released its 500th episode in Jan 2023.

Varney has participated on a regular basis on the improv comedy podcast Spontaneanation with Paul F. Tompkins, where she is referred to as "Little Janet" Varney. She is also one of the core cast members of the improvised SciFi podcast Voyage to the Stars, and the podcast Thrilling Adventure Hour.

Avatar: Braving the Elements, an official Nickelodeon companion podcast to Avatar: The Last Airbender, premiered on June 22, 2021, hosted by Varney (the voice of Korra) and Dante Basco (the voice of Zuko). Varney and Basco discuss key moments and behind-the scenes information from each episode.

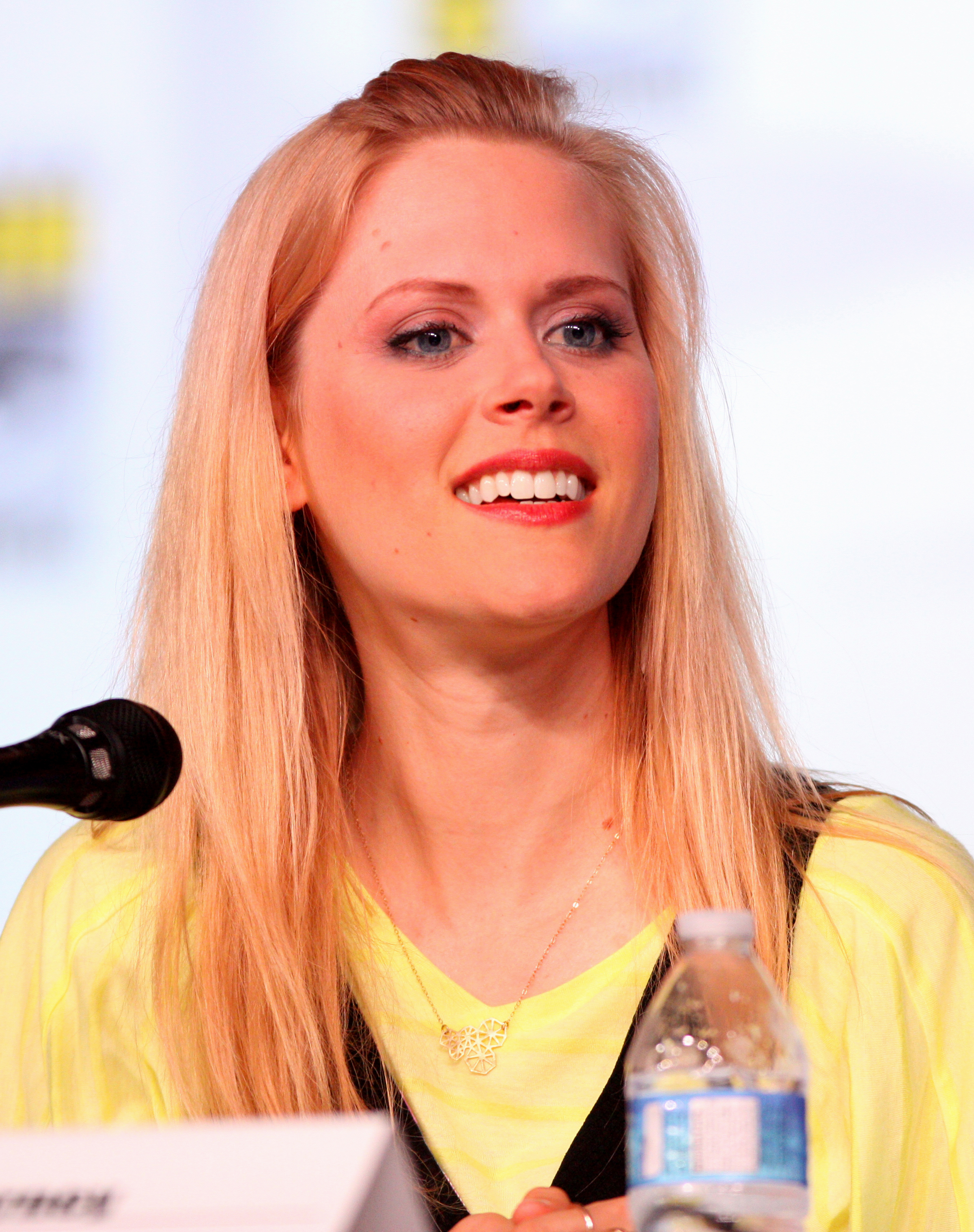
Varney at the 2012 San Diego Comic-Con

Between 2017 and 2020, she appeared in three episodes on the improvised comedy fiction podcast Hello from the Magic Tavern as Braidwynn, an Elven warrior who later returns under the disguise of Crone Bakeress. From 2023 onwards, she returned as a different character, the evil queen Red Queen Merzia. She is also a frequent guest on the comedy puzzle, riddle and lateral thinking podcast Hey Riddle Riddle.

Since 2022, Varney has voiced the character of Janet Lubelle on Welcome to Night Vale.

=== Other professional projects ===
Varney is the co-founder, creative director and producer of SF Sketchfest, the San Francisco Comedy Festival, and is also the co-founder of the San Francisco sketch group Totally False People. She is a core member of the Los Angeles based improv group Theme Park Improv. She performed with the Los Angeles and San Francisco-based group Sequel 4000.

== Personal life ==
Varney dated comedian Chris Hardwick from 2004 to 2011. In 2018, Varney came out as bisexual. In young adulthood, Varney was diagnosed with depersonalization disorder.

== Filmography ==
=== Film ===
Year	Title	Role	Notes
2003	Stuck	Jane	
2004	Catwoman	Party Girl	
2007	Humble Pie	Joleen	
2007	Dante's Inferno	Cleopatra / Dis Intercom / Teacher / Ulysses' Usher	Voice
2008	Bill	Amelia	Short film
2008	Drilbit Taylor	Attractive Blonde Woman	
2009	Still Waiting...	Haley	Direct-to-video
2010	Nic & Tristan Go Mega Dega	Sylvia Fishtickle - Mom	
2011	The Selling	Mary Best	
2011	Judy Moody and the Not Bummer Summer	Mrs. Kate Moody	
2014	Present Tense	Cynthia	Short film
2016	Norm of the North	Janet	Voice
2016	Diani & Devine Meet the Apocalypse	Shana	
2021	See You Next Christmas	Lenora	
2021	Injustice	Wonder Woman / Diana Prince	Voice
2023	Urkel Saves Santa: the Movie	Old Lady Buechler, Amber, and Woman	Voice

=== Television ===
Year	Title	Role	Notes
2004	Crossballs: The Debate Show	Additional Characters	Unknown episodes
2005	Back to Norm	Christine MacDonald	Television film
2006	Free Ride	Megan	Episode: "Up the Aunty"
2006	Love, Inc.	Glenda	Episode: "Full House"
2006	Happy Hour	Molly	Episode: "The Mix CD"
2006	What About Brian	Carol	Episode: "What About First Steps"
2007	Home Purchasing Club	Debbie Driscoll	Unknown episodes
2007	The Untitled Rob Roy Thomas Project	Ellie Tennant	Television film
2007	Halfway Home	Kimberly Costas	2 episodes
2007	Die Hardly Working	Heroine	Television film
2007	Eternal Waters	Lead	Television film
2007	How I Met Your Mother	Stacey Gusar	Episode: "Little Boys"
2007	The Weekend	Madelaine	Television film
2008	Chocolate News	Trina Johns	2 episodes
2008	Man Stroke Woman	Various	Television film
2008, 2014	Psych	Mindy Howland / Connie Camp	2 episodes
2008–09	Back on Topps	Bev Cleary	Series; Unknown episodes
2008–09	Entourage	Amy Miller	3 episodes
2009	Memory Lanes	Tracy Morris	Television film
2009	Bones	Maureen Perot	Episode: "The Bones That Foam"
2009	Better Off Ted	Lawyer	Episode: "Trust and Consequence"
2009	Married Not Dead	Susan	Television film
2011	Hot in Cleveland	Ellen	Episode: "Bad Bromance"
2011	Best Player	Tracy Saunders	Television film
2012	The Game	Summer Grayson	2 episodes
2012	Sullivan & Son	Kim Elliot	Episode: "The Bar Birthday"
2012	Childrens Hospital	Stacy	Episode: "Ladies Night"
2012	Neil's Puppet Dreams	Patron	3 episodes; Also co-creator, writer, and executive producer
2012–13	Burning Love	Carly	Regular role (23 episodes)
2012–13	Key & Peele	Campaign Advisor / White Woman #1	2 episodes
2012–14	The Legend of Korra	Korra	Voice, main role (52 episodes)
2012–14	The Exes	Lorna	2 episodes
2013	MyMusic	Nancy Spackman	2 episodes
2013–14	Kroll Show	Wife / Mrs. Wilson / Jessica	2 episodes
2014	Warehouse 13	Elise	Episode: "Secret Services"
2014	Maron	Delphine	Episode: "Therapy"
2014–19	You're the Worst	Becca Barbara	Recurring role (28 episodes)
2014–16	Sanjay and Craig	Various	Voice, 4 episodes
2015	Shameless	Park Mom	Episode: "Rite of Passage"
2015	Other Space	Host	Episode: "Getting to Know You"
2016	Comedy Bang! Bang!	Movie Trailer Wife	Episode: "Kaley Cuoco Wears a Black Blazer and Slip on Sneakers"
2016	American Housewife	Jenn	Episode: "Power Couple"
2016	ESCAPE!	Host	Web series
2016–17	Mutt & Stuff	Janine / Pilot	Voice, 3 episodes
2016–18	Take My Wife	Melina Marquez	5 episodes
2016–18	Stan Against Evil	Evie Barret	Main role: 18 episodes
2017	Adam Ruins Everything	Mandy	Episode: "Adam Ruins Weight Loss"
2017	Hidden America with Jonah Ray	Leona	Episode: "Cleveland: Can't Win Them All"
2017	HarmonQuest	Sedona	Episode: "The Barely Cursed Bazaar of Commerce"
2018	Bravest Warriors	Ambulance Driver	Voice, episode: "I Just Can't Cope Without My Soap"
2020	Dicktown	Tracey	Episode: "The Mystery of the Moaning Ghost"
2020	The Loud House	Dr. Carol Linnaeus / Automated Voice	Voice, episode: "Blinded by Science"
2020	The George Lucas Talk Show	Self	2 episodes
2021	Country Comfort	Summer	8 episodes
2021	Bless the Harts		Voice, episode: "Betty's Birthday"
2023–24	The Legend of Vox Machina	Vilya	Voice, 2 episodes
2023	Harley Quinn	Mera	Voice, episode: "A Very Problematic Valentine's Day Special"
2023–present	Platonic	Vanessa Miller	5 episodes
2024	Um, Actually	Herself	Season 9, Episode 12
2025–present	Splinter Cell: Deathwatch	Anna Grimsdottir	Voice, 8 episodes

=== Video games ===
Year	Title	Voice role	Notes
2014	The Legend of Korra	Korra	
2014	Smite	Korra	
2021	Nickelodeon All-Star Brawl	Korra	Voiceover added in the June 2022 update
2022	Nickelodeon Kart Racers 3: Slime Speedway	Korra	Final time voicing Korra

=== Audio ===
Year	Title	Voice role	Notes
2017–2020	Hello from the Magic Tavern	Braidwynn / Crone Bakeress	3 episodes
2023–2025	Hello from the Magic Tavern	Red Queen Merzia	3 episodes

== Awards and nominations ==
Year	Award	Category	Work	Result
2016	Primetime Emmy Award	Outstanding Actress in a Short Form Comedy or Drama Series	Everyone's Crazy But Us	Nominated
