= Friends at the Table =

Actual play podcast

- Genre: Actual play; Fantasy podcast; Horror podcast; Science fiction podcast
- Language: English

Cast and voices
- Hosted by: Austin Walker

Publication
- Original release: September 2014

Related
- Website: friendsatthetable.net

Friends at the Table is an actual play podcast hosted by Austin Walker. The podcast has been active since September 2014, and episodes are released weekly. The collaboration between the gamemaster and the players is a major component of the show, in contrast to many tabletop role-playing games where the gamemaster has total control over worldbuilding.

== Production ==
The show is an actual play podcast, but due to its heavy editing, the show is similar in presentation to a radio drama or audiobook. Players on the show contribute to worldbuilding more than in many tabletop role-playing games, where worldbuilding is often left to the gamemaster. The show has been producing episodes since September 2014, and releases episodes on a weekly basis.

=== Cast ===
- Austin Walker (gamemaster)
- Art Martinez-Tebbel
- Alicia Acampora (editor, producer)
- Jack de Quidt (composer)
- Sylvia Clare
- Janine Hawkins
- Keith J. Carberry (editor, producer)
- Darcy Swan
- Nick Scratch (former)

== Seasons ==
The show is split across two feeds: the main feed, which is accessible for free on the website and on podcast platforms, and a paid feed via Patreon. The main feed includes weekly episodes, which are split into seasons. The end of a season is marked with a "post mortem" episode, where the cast answers questions about the season.

Seasons one and two of the show were based on Apocalypse World. According to Walker, he drew inspiration for season six from Mobile Suit Gundam Thunderbolt, Code Geass, Legend of the Galactic Heroes, Aldnoah.Zero, and Mobile Suit Gundam: The 08th MS Team. Various other seasons of the show have drawn elements from many different tabletop role-playing systems, including Dungeon World.

Main Feed
Season no.	Season name	Originally released		Systems used
Season no.	Season name	First episode	Last episode	Systems used
1	Autumn in Hieron (formerly Seasons of Hieron)	September 12, 2014	June 19, 2015	Dungeon World Sherlock Holmes: Consulting Detective (holiday special) The Sundered Land (episode 20)
2	COUNTER/WEIGHT	July 15, 2015	June 26, 2016	The Sprawl TechNoir (beginning episodes) Stars Without Number (faction game episodes) Microscope (faction game episodes) Kingdom (interlude) Mobile Frame Zero: Firebrands (finale)
2.5	Marielda	July 14, 2016	October 14, 2016	Blades in the Dark The Quiet Year (beginning episodes)
3	Winter in Hieron	November 18, 2016	June 28, 2017	Dungeon World Follow (holiday special) Sherlock Holmes: Consulting Detective (holiday special)
4	Twilight Mirage	June 29, 2017	September 10, 2018	The Veil Follow Scum and Villainy Futura Free (finale)
5	Spring in Hieron	October 10, 2018	September 19, 2019	Dungeon World The Quiet Year (finale)
5.5	The Road to PARTIZAN	October 3, 2019	August 3, 2020	Dialect: A Game About Language and How It Dies Armour Astir: Advent Ech0 Dusk To Midnight Beam Saber For the Queen Microscope
6	PARTIZAN	December 19, 2019	February 5, 2021	Beam Saber Kingdom (holiday special) War in the Year 3000 (finale)
7	Sangfielle	March 11, 2021	June 16, 2022	Heart: The City Beneath The Ground Itself (beginning episodes) Inhuman Conditions (episode 21) Anamnesis (episode 52) A Visit to San Sibilia (episode 56)
7.5	The Road to PALISADE	August 26, 2022	January 20, 2023	HOUNDs Stealing the Throne Last Shooting Wagon Wheel Lancer Orbital Serious Reading My Way Upstairs & Downstairs City Planning Department
8	PALISADE	March 10, 2023	August 30, 2024	Armour Astir: Advent Questlandia (Palette of Colors arc)
9	Perpetua	March 13 2025	Ongoing	Fabula Ultima Cartograph: Atlas Edition (Prelude arc)

The Patreon feed consists of two main campaigns (Bluff City and Realis) along other show formats and extras.

Patreon Feed
Show name	Release period	Description
Bluff City	2017-Ongoing	The main Patreon campaign, released parallel to any ongoing main feed seasons.
Clapcast	2017-Ongoing	A collection of bloopers and off-topic discussions cut from various episodes.
Live at the Table	2017-Ongoing	Oneshots or short series played live, usually on a stream previously only available to Patreon patrons.
Tips at the Table	2017-2021	An advice show where the cast answers questions about roleplaying.
Drawing Maps	2018-2023	Austin Walker's show where he discusses preparations for games as a GM.
Gathering Information	2023-Ongoing	A behind the scenes show where Alicia Acampora discusses specific aspects of the current ongoing season with other cast members.
Realis	2025-Ongoing	An actual play show in Austin Walker's Realis system, released parallel to the main feed seasons.

Since 2023, Friends at the Table has also produced podcasts outside of the actual play genre, which appear in their own public feeds.

Other Shows
Show name	Release period	Description
Media Club Plus	2023–Ongoing	A discussion show about specific pieces of media, beginning with Hunter x Hunter and moving on to the films of M. Night Shyamalan.
Side Story	2025–Ongoing	A discussion show about video games.

== Reception ==
The podcast had more than 3,929 Patreon supporters as of July 2021. The show was featured on iTunes in 2020. Dan Neilan wrote in The A.V. Club that it is an "intimidating podcast to jump into" and a "bit overwhelming", but despite this the story had "rich, complex lore." It was cited by The Adventure Zone GM Griffin McElroy as an inspiration for elements of that podcast's first campaign.

=== Awards ===
Award	Date	Category	Recipient	Result	Ref.
Discover Pods Awards	2019	Best Overall Podcast	Friends at the Table	Finalist	
Audio Verse Awards	2019	Instrumental Composition in a Production	"Spring In Hieron" by Jack de Quidt	Won	
Audio Verse Awards	2019	Vocal Composition in a Production	"Tell Me" by Jack de Quidt	Won	
Audio Verse Awards	2019	Player Direction of a Production	Austin Walker	Won	
Audio Verse Awards	2019	Player in an Improvised Production	Ali Acampora as Hella Varal	Won	
Audio Verse Awards	2019	Improvised Production	Friends at the Table	Won	
Audio Verse Awards	2020	Instrumental Composition in a Production	"RADIOSTATIC. HIATUS. REDSKY" by Jack de Quidt	Finalist	
Audio Verse Awards	2020	Instrumental Composition in a Production	"TANAGER. PERFECT. TOUCHPAPER." by Jack de Quidt	Finalist	
Audio Verse Awards	2020	Player Direction of a Production	Austin Walker	Finalist	
Audio Verse Awards	2020	Cover Art for a Production	Craig Sheldon	Finalist	
Audio Verse Awards	2020	Improvised Production	Friends at the Table	Finalist	

== See also ==
- List of fantasy podcasts
- List of Dungeons & Dragons web series
