= Grant Howitt =

UK game designer and journalist

- Born: United Kingdom
- Education: University of East Anglia
- Occupations: Game designer, Publisher, Journalist
- Employer(s): Rowan, Rook and Decard
- Website: https://rowanrookanddecard.com/

Grant Howitt is a tabletop role-playing game designer, publisher, and journalist. He won six ENNIE Awards for his game Heart: The City Beneath. His game Honey Heist, which inspired an online trend of self-published games with one-page rulesets, has been featured on Critical Role, The Adventure Zone, and Friends at the Table. Through his publishing company Rowan, Rook and Decard, Howitt is a co-designer on Kieron Gillen's DIE: The Roleplaying Game.

== Early life and education ==
Howitt began creating games in grade school, running downloaded PDF files through a text processor.

While in college he discovered live action role-playing and there he met Mary "Maz" Hamilton and his best friend Christopher Taylor. He married Hamilton. After college, Howitt and Hamilton moved to Australia and started a Patreon while he was legally unable to work there. While living in Australia he started a Kickstarter to produce role-playing games.

== Career ==
Grant Howitt and Maz Hamilton designed a live-action zombie roleplaying game together.

Howitt began designing a new version of the Paranoia role-playing game with James Wallis and Paul Dean in 2014 for Mongoose Publishing.

While living in Australia, Howitt designed his own role-playing game Goblin Quest, writing it on dozens of pages and spending weeks of work on it. Goblin Quest was 132 pages and he published it in 2015, and when he found this production schedule too difficult Hamilton suggested he start designing one-page role-playing games instead. He started writing one-page RPGs beginning with Force-Blade Punk (2016). He since created many other one-page RPGs. Howitt has a Patreon supporting an ongoing project with plans to create 100 one-page RPGs, and he has created Sexy Battle Wizards, Pride and Extreme Prejudice, and Jason Statham's Big Vacation.

Howitt later became the co-owner of Rowan, Rook, and Decard. The first collaborative release between Howitt and Christopher Taylor was the role-playing game Unbound. He created the game One Last Job. Howitt created the tabletop role-playing game Honey Heist in 2017 as part of his promise to make one game per month. He was the co-creator of Spire: The City Must Fall. He designed Heart: The City Beneath.

Kieron Gillen teamed up with Howitt to adapt his Die comic into a tabletop role-playing game. Howitt created the game Eat the Reich, inspired after Gen Con 2022 and the game A Conventional Disaster inspired after Fan Convention Pyrkon.

== Games ==
Howitt designed the games Heart: The City Beneath, Honey Heist, Eat the Reich, and Spire: The City Must Fall. In 2022, Howitt became a co-designer and publisher for Kieron Gillen's DIE RPG. In a featured interview on Gizmodo, Howitt described DIE as "a game about why we play games" and his goal for the final product as "a machine to manufacture heartbreak." Howitt has also self-published a large number of games with rules that fit on one page. As of July 2023, Howitt has published 79 games on Itch.io.

=== Publishing company ===
In 2017, Howitt co-founded the games publishing company Rowan, Rook and Decard, with spouse Maz Hamilton as business director. The company currently publishes DIE RPG, Heart: The City Beneath, Spire: The City Must Fall, Honey Heist, Unbound, and Goblin Quest.

=== Awards and nominations ===
Eat the Reich won three Gold ENNIE Awards in 2024 including "Best Cover," "Best Art – Interior," and "Best Adventure – Short Form." It was also nominated for "Product of the Year."

Heart: The City Beneath won six ENNIE Awards in 2021: Gold winner for Best Setting, Best Writing and Best Layout, and Silver winner for Best Art, Best Art - Interior, Best Game, and Best Monster/Adversary.

In the 2020 ENNIE Awards, Royal Blood was nominated for Best Game and Sexy Battle Wizards for Best Free Game/Product. In addition to winning six ENNIE Awards in 2021, Heart was also nominated for Product of the Year. In 2023, DIE: The Roleplaying Game was nominated for an ENNIE for Best Production Values.

== Influence ==
Howitt's design inspired a trend of "experimental zines" and "poetic lyric games" on Imgur and Itch.io. In a feature article on Grant Howitt, Chase Carter for Polygon called him "one of the foundational voices in the current generation of tabletop RPG creators" because the success of Honey Heist inspired other designers to create and self-publish one-page games. Howitt expressed the hope that his game design legacy would be, "Showing people that you don’t need to have a bunch of money or time to create something which is resonant and give people a fun experience". Game Rant refer to him as "veteran TTRPG designer Grant Howitt" and to their request advice for homebrew developers looking to publish their game systems, Howitt responds "Get on itch.io and publish whatever crud you've got as soon as you can. Don't worry too much about it being perfect—it won't be!"

Several of Howitt's games have featured on actual play programs. In 2017, his game Honey Heist was used by Critical Role in three one-shot episodes. In 2018, Howitt's game Crash Pandas was used by Critical Role in one-shot Crash Pandas: Too Trashed, Too Curious and by Twitch stream Surprise Round in 4 raccoons, a car, and a dream. In 2019, The Adventure Zone used Howitt's Honey Heist system as part of their event MaxFunDrive "Fur". Heart: The City Beneath provided the game engine for the 2021 campaign of the actual play podcast Friends at the Table. In 2022, Howitt worked with Marisha Ray on the one-page RPG A Familiar Problem, used on the Critical Role one-shot Sprinkle's Incredible Journey, and later published by Critical Role imprint Darrington Press.

In her PhD thesis, Susan Haarman wrote that Honey Heist by Howitt was one of the smaller independent games "that either minimize or eliminate combat altogether. These games have experienced high levels of commercial and critical success" as "the player base for tabletop games continues to diversify, both patience and interest has diminished for games models that still manifest 1970’s mentalities and/or focus solely on violence".

== Journalism ==
Howitt has worked as a freelance writer for mainstream publications such as the Daily Mirror and The Guardian and indie organizations such as Video Brains. He has described his style as "Gonzo Tech Journalism".
