= Love and Luck =

Love and Luck may refer to:

- Love and Luck (album), a 1994 album by Marty Stuart
- Love and Luck (podcast), a fictional queer love story set in Melbourne, Australia
- Love and Luck (film), a 1932 French comedy film
