= Imaginary Worlds =

Imaginary Worlds may refer to:

- Fictional universes
- Imaginary Worlds: The Art of Fantasy, a 1973 study of the modern literary fantasy genre by Lin Carter
- Imaginary Worlds (podcast), an episodic science fiction and fantasy podcast
