= Beth May =

American podcast host (born 1992)

- Born: January 10, 1992 (age 34)
- Occupations: Podcast host, game master, chief marketing officer (formerly)
- Years active: 2019-present
- Known for: Dungeons & Daddies

Beth May (born 1992) is an American author and actor best known for her performance on the podcast Dungeons & Daddies.

== Career ==
May has been a principal cast member of the podcast Dungeons & Daddies since it first aired in January 2019. As of February 2025, the podcast had over 66,000 supporters on Patreon and has been in the top 100 podcasts by listeners on Spotify. May played step-dad Ron Stampler in season one, goth teen Terry "Scary" Marlowe in season two, homemaker Trudy Trout in season three, and grandpa Herb "The Worm" Quiggly in season four. She has appeared on other podcasts including Roll For Persuasion, Foes and Fables, Hey Riddle Riddle, Story Break, and The Mental Illness Happy Hour, in addition to Dropout shows Dirty Laundry and Um, Actually.

May's first book, The Immortal Soul Salvage Yard, was published on December 15, 2020 by Sideshow Media Group. It is a small poetry book, about 88 pages, that is a collection of memories and scraps of paper from her past. Sunday Scaries, a spoken word album written and performed by May, was released in 2023.

May was a supporting screenwriter for the indie feature film We're All Gonna Die, directed by Dungeons and Daddies co-stars Matthew Arnold and Freddie Wong. The film premiered at South by Southwest in 2023.

In 2023, May wrote and starred in Beth Wants The D, an autobiographical comedy play about her bipolar disorder. Beth Wants The D was directed by Riley Rose Critchlow. The play raised over $40,000 on Kickstarter to enter the Hollywood Fringe Festival and Edinburgh Festival Fringe and was first performed at the Lyric Hyperion in Los Angeles. In 2025, the show went to Edinburgh Festival Fringe, playing at the Pleasance Courtyard from July 30th to August 24th and winning the Mental Health Foundation Fringe Award.

In 2026, May met and interviewed Buddy, the golden retriever starring in the upcoming Air Bud reboot, Air Bud Returns at San Diego Comic Con.

== Personal life ==
May was born in Florida, but grew up in Tucson, Arizona and attended Arizona State University, graduating with a B.A. in Screenwriting. She has been open about her struggle with bipolar disorder.
