= Laura Stachel =

Former medical doctor and founder of We Care Solar

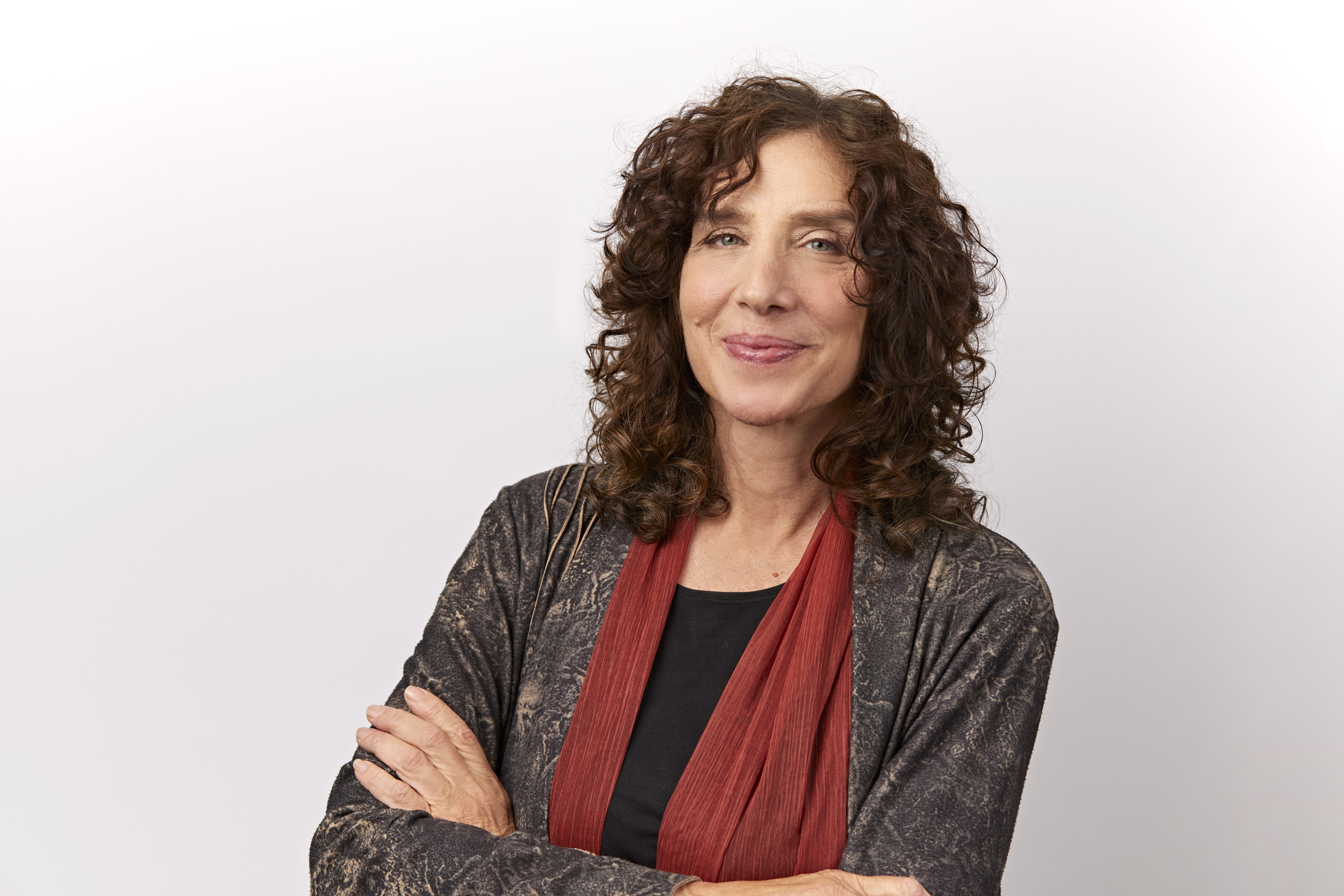
Dr. Laura Stachel

Laura Stachel is a former medical doctor who founded and leads We Care Solar, a nonprofit that manufactures and deploys solar electric systems the size of a suitcase for use in medical clinics in the developing world. She is also the mother of actor and singer Ari'el Stachel.

== Education and early life ==
Laura Stachel was born in New York City and brought up in the Boston area. She earned her undergraduate degree in Psychology graduating summa cum laude at Oberlin College. She earned her medical degree at University of California, San Francisco in 1985, and in 2006 earned a master's in public health from UC Berkeley. In 2020, she received her doctorate in Public Health at UC Berkeley

== Career ==
Stachel practiced as an Ob/Gyn doctor after finishing medical school, but in 2002 pain from degeneration in the vertebrae in her neck forced her to quit delivering babies and eventually to leave clinical medicine. She went back to school to earn a masters in public health and began lecturing at UC Berkeley. In 2008, while studying for her doctorate, she traveled to Nigeria to study why rates of maternal mortality were so high. During that time she witnessed how lack of electricity directly affected health outcomes for women and infants during childbirth.

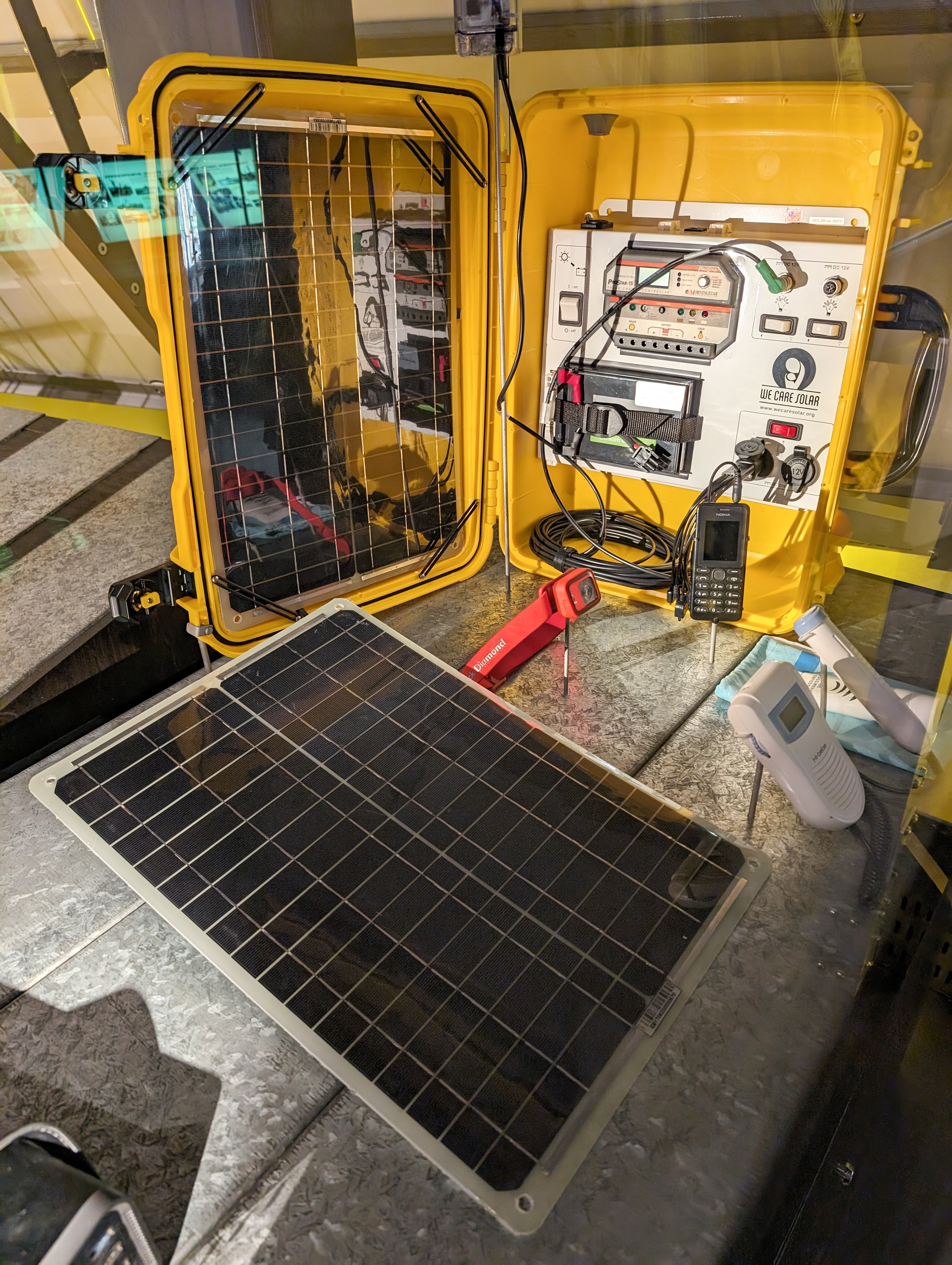
Solar suitcase produced by We Care Solar

Her husband, Hal Aronson, was creating solar education programs in the San Francisco Bay area. She asked if he could design a system that would target areas of the Nigerian hospital most important for maternal health. The solar electric system he created for the maternity ward, labor room, operating theater, and laboratory, helped the hospital achieve a 70% drop in maternal mortality the next year. Surrounding clinics began to ask for solar power, and Hal designed solar power for ob/gyn clinics in the developing world. Aronson designed a system the size of a suitcase to allow Laura to transport these to Africa. The Solar Suitcase had solar panels to be removed and mounted on the roof, a charge controller, a 12-volt battery, LED lights, and multiple outlets; the "Solar Suitcase" was eventually further developed to include phone chargers, a fetal monitor, and customized long-lasting LED lights. Stachel brought the first one back to Nigeria in 2009 and the clinic asked to keep it. Hal and Laura received further help from an engineer, Brent Moellenberg, and support from Bay area solar companies Everbright Solar and Holly Solar Products, to perfect the design and work out the manufacturing.

The couple established a nonprofit, We Care Solar (formerly WE CARE — an acronym for Women's Emergency Communication and Reliable Electricity), and it received its IRS nonprofit ruling in 2011. The couple at first built the solar devices in their garage and backyard. They sought ways to fund it; Stachel competed in a technology for social good competition in 2009, earning only an "honorable mention," but one of the judges connected them with the Blum Center for Developing Economies at UC Berkeley which provided the nonprofit with office space and financial support.

In 2010 the nonprofit received an order from WHO for 20 devices in clinics in Liberia, and received a grant from the MacArthur Foundation, allowing them pilot Solar Suitcases in Nigeria and Uganda and to hire an engineer. Stachel entered several more social entrepreneurship business competitions and received mentoring and scholarships to understand how to run a nonprofit. Over the next few years, We Care Solar built a team of finance, programmatic, and engineering staff. They launched the Light Every Birth initiative in 2017, calling upon governments, UN agencies, and international NGOs to ensure that every woman can access safe childbirth in a facility equipped with clean, reliable energy. By 2021, according to Stachel, there were more than 6,500 Solar Suitcases installed in more than 20 countries, and We Care Solar had worked with 75 other NGOs and UN agencies to serve more than 8.9 million mothers and newborns.

== Awards and honors ==
Stachel is one of the 2024 AARP Purpose Prize winners. She was one of the Top 10 CNN Heroes of 2013. For her work with We Care Solar, she received the 2019 Zayed Sustainability Prize, the 2017 UNFCCC Momentum for Change Award, The 2017 Drucker Innovation Prize, the 2017 Bloomberg New Energy Pioneer Award, the 2015 UN DESA “Powering the Future We Want” Award, the 2015 UBS Optimus Award, the 2015 UCSF Alumni Award, the 2014 Katerva Gender Equality Award, the 2012 Clean Energy, Education and Empowerment Award, the 2012 United Nations Association Global Citizens Award, the 2011 Tech Award, the 2010 Jefferson Award for Public Service, a Savvy Award in 2019 and the 2010 UC Berkeley Chancellor’s Award for Civic Engagement. Stachel was selected for the inaugural 2021 Forbes 50 Over 50; made up of entrepreneurs, leaders, scientists and creators who are over the age of 50.
