= Eat the Reich =

2023 tabletop role-playing game

- Designers: Grant Howitt
- Illustrators: Will Kirkby
- Publication: 2023
- Genres: Tabletop role-playing game

Eat the Reich is a tabletop role-playing game about heroic vampires sucking the blood of Nazis during World War II. It was designed by Grant Howitt. Players choose from a set of six predetermined characters. Eat the Reich won three Gold ENNIE Awards in 2024.

== Themes ==
In an interview with Gizmodo, Howitt's partner Maz Hamilton explained the game's use of anti-fascist vampires:

"I think there are an absolute ton of people from marginalized groups for whom the idea of adopting, even embracing, a monstrous-ness and embracing a monstrous identity in order to violently commit direct antifascist action is an extremely relevant thing right now.”

== Reception ==
Eat the Reich won three Gold ENNIE Awards in 2024 including "Best Cover," "Best Art – Interior," and "Best Adventure – Short Form." It was also nominated for "Product of the Year."

Samantha Nelson for Polygon named Eat the Reich as one of the best new tabletop RPG books of 2024, recommending it for fans of Inglourious Basterds and Suicide Squad. She praised the game for "keeping descriptions short while providing plenty of wild settings and antagonists."
