= Alba Salix, Royal Physician =

Fantasy podcast

- Genre: Fantasy podcast
- Language: English

Cast and voices
- Voices: Barbara Clifford; Julian Sark; Olivia Jon; Elaine O’Neal; Marisa King; George Bertwell; Carter Siddall; Abbas Hussain; Jasmin Cheng

Production
- Production: Carter Siddall; Eric Portelance; Mark Fenwick; Josh Clavir; Dave Addison; Heather Collins; Michael Hudson; Keiko Kanda; Jack Pevyhouse; Julian Sark; Paul Tedesco; Kim Bellinger
- Length: 15–30 Minutes

Publication
- No. of episodes: 58
- Original release: November 6, 2014
- Provider: Fable and Folly

Reception
- Ratings: 4.63855421686747/5, 4.7/5

Related
- Related shows: Kalila Stormfire’s Economical Magick Services; Love and Luck; Mission to Zyxx; The Horror of Dolores Roach; Join the Party
- Website: albasalix.com

Alba Salix, Royal Physician is a comedy fantasy podcast.

== Background ==
The show has had difficulty generating funds. The show focuses on magical ailments that Alba Salix diagnoses and cures. The show is set in the fantastical world of Farloria. The show is similar to a sitcom.

== Cast and characters ==
- Barbara Clifford as Alba Salix
- Julian Sark as Magnus of Hezelford
- Olivia Jon as Holly
- George Bertwell as King Gunther
- Marisa King as Queen Parabel
- Carter Siddall as Helbard Krankel

== Reception ==
The show was nominated for four awards at the 2015 Audio Verse Awards. The show won a Gold in "The Ogle Award for Fantasy" at the 2015 Mark Time Awards. The show was a 2020 Nominee for the T.O. Webfest. The show was nominated for a Parsec award in 2015. The show was nominated in the 2020 Canadian Podcast Awards.

== See also ==
- List of fantasy podcasts
