= Spire: The City Must Fall =

Tabletop role-playing game

- Cover art by Adrian Stone
- Designers: Grant Howitt and Chris Taylor
- Illustrators: Adrian Stone, Tim Wilkinson Lewis
- Publishers: Rowan, Rook and Decard
- Publication: 2018
- Genres: Tabletop role-playing game, fantasy

Spire: The City Must Fall is a fantasy tabletop role-playing game that reimagines the drow (a Dungeons & Dragons race of evil predators) as a race subjugated and enslaved. The game was designed by Grant Howitt and Chris Taylor and released by the indie publisher Rowan, Rook and Decard in 2018.

== Description ==
The players take on the roles of drow who are members of a secret society dedicated to overthrowing their oppressors. As RPG historian Stu Horvath notes:

In D&D, the drow are emblematic of a kind of racial essentialism that enables the game's underlying power fantasy — the entire dark-skinned, subterranean, spider-worshipping race is known to be inherently evil, so players can attack and kill them without upending their moral compasses.

In Spire, the tables are turned. It is the formerly righteous and good high elves who have conquered the drow's massive city structure known as the Spire and enslaved its citizens, justifying their actions by claiming that the drow are a lesser race.

The game uses a set of rules titled "Resistance System".

=== Character generation ===
Each player must first determine their character's Durance (a kind of forced labour) to the ruling high elves (aelfir): In what role did they serve (Assistant, Guard, Worker, etc.) before they decided to rebel? The player then chooses one of eleven Classes such as Carrion Priest, Knight, Midwife, or Vermissian Sage. The chosen Class defines what traits, equipment, and proficiencies the character now possesses, as well as the ability to use magic.

=== Action resolution ===
When a character attempts a skill check, the player rolls a pool of 10-sided dice and consults a table to see if the check is a success or failure. A failure causes Stress in one of five categories:

- Blood (physical damage)
- Mind (mental strain)
- Silver (monetary resources)
- Shadow (Secrecy inherent in living a double life)
- Reputation (Approval within the community)

The player rolls a die to see if the failure caused Fallout, which will affect the relevant Stress — Blood Fallout can lead to Bleeding or Dying, Silver Fallout can force the character to borrow money from loan sharks, and Shadow Fallout can cause the character's double life as a rebel to be unmasked. The only two ways to repair Fallout damage are to rest, or take a specific action.

== Publication history ==
Grant Howitt and Chris Taylor created a new RPG and used Kickstarter to crowdsource enough funds to publish it . The result was Spire: The City Must Fall, released by indie role-playing game publishers Rowan, Rook and Decard (RRD) as a 232-page book designed by Howitt and Taylor, with cover and interior art by Adrian Stone. RRD also released a number of supplements, including Kings of Silver (2018), Blood & Dust (2018), Eidolon Sky (2018), Strata (2019), and Sin (2021).

In 2020, Howitt followed up with the thematically-linked spin-off RPG Heart: The City Beneath, which shared the same setting as Spire but shifted focus to the underground chasms and ruins known as the Heart.

== Reception ==
Andy Lingua reviewed the Italian edition and warned, "Are you looking for something light and joyful? Don't go further ... Spire: The City Must Fall is not for you." Lingua commented, "Few titles have dealt with [intrigue and alliance] with the same depth as Spire: The City Must Fall ... There are mechanics to describe power games; the text underlines the importance of watching your back." Lingua commended the artwork of Adrian Stone, saying, "The manual is studded with incredibly beautiful illustrations. Consistency in style is impeccable, the effect is powerful. Few times I have seen such a particular setting supported by equally particular but at the same time coherent series of illustrations." Lingua concluded, "the attention to detail relating to the setting is incredible; ... if you like narrative role-playing games, I can advise you to give it a chance. The mix of classic and innovative elements is perfectly balanced."

Jared Rascher noted, "the mechanics of stress and fallout are both familiar and combined in a new and exciting fashion, and I think that even people that are a little burned out on fantasy may want to keep an eye on these mechanics and how they managed to promote and resolve story elements." Rascher concluded, "This product is exceptional, and may contain content that would interest you even if the game or genre covered is outside of your normal interests. I think if you have even a passing interest in fantasy settings, the information in this book is going to make for a solid purchase, even if you never use the ruleset."

In his 2023 book Monsters, Aliens, and Holes in the Ground, RPG historian Stu Horvath commented "Spire: The City Must Fall takes all those assumptions D&D players might have about drow (and regular elves and the hyena-like gnolls, too) and throws them right out the window ... The game is built around causing and sustaining damage — inflict every bit of suffering back onto the unjust system that caused it." Horvath noted the continual focus on stress, saying, "Stress and Fallout accrue rapidly, ensuring the characters are fragile and uncertain, while also keeping players fully aware of how much a character has left to give." Horvath concluded, "Player characters regularly perform both wonderful and terrible deeds in the service of noble goals, but no matter their successes, no matter how wounded the system of oppression is, it persists while the characters burn up in their resistance."
