= Charlie McCrackin =

Charlie McCrackin is an American comedian, writer, and actor. He is best known as the character Coach Dick Novak on the comedy series A.P. Bio (2018–2021).

== Life and career ==
McCrackin was raised in the small town of Stanley, Wisconsin. He attended Stanley-Boyd High School, where he was co-captain when the football team won the Division Four State Championship. He graduated in 1996. McCrackin enrolled at University of Wisconsin–Eau Claire to study English. However, he was primarily interested in comedy. He dropped out of school one semester before graduation to move to Chicago in pursuit of a comedy career.

He studied improv at iO Theater and Second City, eventually joining the improv troupe The Reckoning. While in Chicago he also wrote a musical called The Raven & the Messenger, about Jim Jones, that was staged at Annoyance Theater.

McCrackin, his wife, and their two children relocated to Los Angeles in 2015. Soon after he was hired for his first television writing and acting job for A.P. Bio, on which he portrayed Coach Dick Novak. The show was created by his former The Reckoning teammate Mike O'Brien.

McCrackin has voiced the character Spintax the Green on the improv comedy podcast Hello from the Magic Tavern since 2015. He is also a frequent guest on Comedy Bang! Bang!.
