= Adal Rifai =

American comedian and podcaster

Adal Rifai (born 1982) is an American comedian and podcaster based in Chicago. He is best known as the co-host of the improv comedy podcasts Hello From the Magic Tavern and Hey Riddle Riddle. He has performed with and coached improv teams in Chicago since 2007.

== Career ==
Rifai moved to Chicago in 2005 to study acting. His improv training began when he received a scholarship to take classes at Second City. He later joined improv teams at iO theater, including the Harold team Revolver. He joined the theater's improv comedy show Whirled News Tonight in 2008, where he met his eventual co-hosts of the improvised podcast Hello from the Magic Tavern. Rifai portrays Chunt, a shapeshifter that typically takes the form of a badger. The podcast premiered in 2015.

Rifai created Hey Riddle Riddle in 2018, co-hosted by fellow comedians John Patrick Coan and Erin Keif, due to his interest in riddles and puzzles. The podcast, which features the hosts solving puzzles and creating improv comedy scenes based on them, is produced by Headgum.

== Personal life ==
Rifai married Jemma Rifai in 2022. They reside in Chicago.
