= Dungeons & Daddies =

Comedy podcast

- Genre: Fantasy; Actual play Comedy; Adventure; Roleplaying
- Language: English

Cast and voices
- Hosted by: Anthony Burch; Freddie Wong; Matt Arnold; Will Campos; Beth May

Music
- Opening theme: "Alright" (season 1) "On My Way" (season 2) by Maxton Waller "A Hole In The Stars" (season 3) by Maxton Waller "Conventional Wisdom" (season 4) by Maxton Waller

Production
- Production: Freddie Wong

Publication
- Original release: January 2019
- Provider: Acast
- Updates: Fortnightly

Related
- Website: dungeonsanddaddies.com

Dungeons & Daddies is an actual play RPG comedy podcast hosted by Matt Arnold, Anthony Burch, Will Campos, Beth May, and Freddie Wong, playing Dungeons & Dragons and Call of Cthulhu. First aired in January 2019, the podcast features four main seasons, as well as some mini campaigns.

== Description ==
Dungeons & Daddies is an unscripted comedy podcast recorded as an ongoing series of role-playing sessions. The first two seasons were loosely based on the fifth edition of Dungeons & Dragons; the third season uses the Call of Cthulhu game system. The fourth season uses a science fiction conversion of the 5th edition of D&D called Dark Matter. The podcast first aired in January 2019.

It has received popular and critical acclaim and is consistently ranked as one the best D&D podcasts of all time, with favorable comparisons to series like Critical Role, Dimension 20, Not Another D&D Podcast and The Adventure Zone.

=== Plot ===
During a trip to a soccer tournament, four suburban dads and their sons are teleported into the Forgotten Realms. When their children are kidnapped, the dads begin a quest to rescue them. Season two takes place 25 years later, in a post-apocalyptic version of San Dimas, California. The teenage grandchildren of season one's characters are tasked with finding their fathers, who have disappeared with little explanation. The early episodes of season two loosely follow a "Monster of the Week" format.

Season three of Dungeons and Daddies is not connected to the characters or events of the first two seasons, and follows four citizens of Peachyville, a fictional 1950s suburban town. The season uses the Call of Cthulhu system, as opposed to D&D 5th edition used for the other seasons.

Season four of Dungeons and Daddies, subtitled "Grandpas and Galaxies" is self-described as a "...grand space popera..." and follows four grandfathers attempting to rescue their grandchildren who get abducted by aliens during a video game tournament.

=== Cast ===
Being an actual-play podcast, the principal cast features not only players but a gamemaster responsible for game management and the portrayal of most minor characters. This role is taken by Anthony Burch in seasons one, two and four, and by Will Campos in season three. There are four other principal cast members, who play four dads in season one, and four of those characters' grandchildren in season two. Both seasons one and two have had guest players, though not all guests have had characters with standard player classes. Season three departed from the characters and events of the first season and uses the Call of Cthulu game system. Season four introduced new characters who are grandparents lost in a science fiction setting, utilizing the Dark Matter variant D&D system.

Dungeons & Daddies Player Characters
Player	Season 1 character	Season 2 character	Season 3 character	Season 4 character	Ref
Anthony Burch	Gamemaster	Gamemaster	Francis Farnsworth	Gamemaster	
Freddie Wong	Glenn Close – Human Bard (Shifter stats)	Taylor Swift – Tiefling Ranger (Tiefling Rogue after se. 2 ep. 44)	Tony Collette and Blake Lively	Ashley Birch – Human Gadgeteer	
Matt Arnold	Darryl Wilson – Human Barbarian (Goliath stats)	Lincoln "Link" Li-Wilson – Human Paladin	Kelsey Grammar	Dale Elliot – Human Monk	
Will Campos	Henry Oak – Human Druid (Wood Elf stats)	Normal "Norm" Oak – Human Cleric	Gamemaster	Ralph Estarellas – Human Sorcerer	
Beth May	Ron Stampler – Human Rogue (Tiefling stats)	Theresa "Scary" Marlowe – Human Warlock	Trudy Trout	Herb "The Worm" Quigley – Human Barbarian	
Ashly Burch	Dennis Anderson – Human Rogue	-			
Jenna Stoeber	Ratticus Finch	-			
Jimmy Wong	Jodie Foster – Human Paladin	Jodie Foster – Demon Oathbreaker Paladin			
Elyse Willems	-	Erica Drippins			

=== Campaigns ===
Major and minor campaigns are listed below. Includes Patreon-only campaigns as well.

Campaign	Episodes	Game system	Game master	Release date	Ref
Season 1: Odyssey	68.5 (69)	D&D 5th edition	Anthony Burch	January 22, 2019 – October 19, 2021	
At The Mountains of Dadness	3	Call of Cthulhu	Anthony Burch	November 1, 2019 – December 3, 2019	
Gungans and Daddies: All That Jizz	3	Edge of the Empire	Anthony Burch	March 29, 2021 – June 22, 2021	
Fetch Quest	3	D&D 5th edition	Will Campos	November 16, 2021 – December 13, 2021	
Sons and Sonsability	3	Custom-made (Cross between The Good Society and Marrying Mister Darcy: The Board Game)	Anthony Burch Amanda Shuckman	May 7, 2022 – July 3, 2022	
Season 2: Quest	53	D&D 5th edition	Anthony Burch	January 25, 2022 – March 26, 2024	
Season 3: The Peachyville Horror	39	Call of Cthulhu	Will Campos	May 7, 2024 – Dec 2, 2025	
DADHAMMER 40,000	3	Wrath and Glory	Matt Arnold	October 22, 2024 – February 7, 2025	
Season 4: Grandpas and Galaxies	TBD	Dark Matter (science fiction variant of D&D 5th edition)	Anthony Burch	February 11, 2026 – present	

=== Mini-campaign characters ===
Major and minor characters from the self-contained mini-campaigns.

Campaign	Player	Character
At The Mountains of Dadness	Freddie Wong	Meryl Streep: Actor
At The Mountains of Dadness	Matt Arnold	Robert Wilson: Line producer
At The Mountains of Dadness	Will Campos	Hildy Russet: Makeup girl / Journalist
At The Mountains of Dadness	Beth May	Stuart "Stud" Stampler: Carpenter
Gungans and Daddies: All That Jizz	Freddie Wong	Beef Himbo: Droid / Manager
Gungans and Daddies: All That Jizz	Matt Arnold	Yap Yappa Yowza: Yuzzum / Bass player
Gungans and Daddies: All That Jizz	Will Campos	Olp Mondez: Human / Kloohorn player
Gungans and Daddies: All That Jizz	Beth May	Gurdy Vanda: Pa'Lowick / Singer
Fetch Quest	Freddie Wong	Mochi: Cat
Fetch Quest	Matt Arnold	Donut: Truck stop dog
Fetch Quest	Anthony Burch	Beignet: Influencer dog
Fetch Quest	Beth May	Cookie: Spy dog
Sons and Sonsability	Freddie Wong	Fanny Mothman: Piano player
Sons and Sonsability	Matt Arnold	Cynthia Nixon née Mothman: Cowboy
Sons and Sonsability	Will Campos	Eunice Mothman: Sickly / Religious
Sons and Sonsability	Beth May	Elizabeth Mothman: Crazy / Dancer

== Reception ==
=== Viewership and listenership ===
As of August 2026, the Dungeons & Daddies podcast averages millions of monthly downloads. It has over 84,000 paid subscribers on Patreon and Discord. It remains in the Top 100 Comedy Podcasts on Spotify.

Cast member Freddie Wong said that early in the COVID pandemic, the podcast, which earns money via subscription and Patreon donations, had lost subscribers, many of whom had been laid off. However, by July 2020, the podcast had regained subscribers and the audience grew well beyond its initial numbers.

=== Critical response ===
In 2023, Book Riot rated Dungeons & Daddies as one of the "10 Best D&D Podcasts" alongside Critical Role and Not Another D&D Podcast.

In 2025, ComicBook.com ranked Dungeons & Daddies among the "Top 10 Best D&D Actual Play Podcasts", comparing it favorably to Dimension 20 and The Adventure Zone as a comedic alternative to Critical Role. Later that year, Inverse made a similar comparison.

The website Collider wrote, "Dungeons and Daddies is an often hilarious, often heartfelt, and always entertaining podcast that manages to both be an insightful look at life and parenting, while also being silly, with characters who are both playing into the dad stereotypes and have an impressive depth. If you're looking for a well-written, funny, and almost addicting campaign to listen to as you go through your daily tasks, this is the one."

Molly Olmstead of Slate hailed the series as her current obsession. "Maybe it's that Dungeons & Daddies essentially ignores real complex gameplay in favor of creating chaos; maybe it's that I had room for only one D&D podcast in my life. Whatever it was, it worked." Later, she admitted she kept her sanity in a tumultuous election year by binging "68 hour-plus episodes of five nerds playing a board game."

The website MovieWeb praised the series for its anarchical humor and depictions of healthy masculinity, as the dads embark on a quest "to break cycles of generational trauma and give their sons more love and protection than their fathers ever gave them... alongside the jokes, the tears, and the epic combat, Dungeons & Daddies: Odyssey is a story about family."

On the website Geekiary, Em Rowntree gave the series a highly positive review, noting that knowledge of Dungeons & Dragons was not necessary, the content was hilarious, and the technical production values were very high. Rowntree concluded, "Once you've listened to the podcast, you will feel the urge to share your love for it with others. You'll want to spread the word of its hilarity to your nearest and dearest."

The website Lifehacker gave Dungeons & Daddies a very positive recommendation, positioning the series as a less intimidating version of Critical Role. "You’ll be laughing hard enough to chisel your dad bod gut into a six pack, but the storytelling is also deceptively clever."

Durant Welsh of Grimdark Magazine gave Dungeons & Daddies a highly positive review. "The production is so slick and choreographed that one suspects it is scripted to a degree, with some room for improv, but that doesn't at all detract from the enjoyment... And it is hilarious. In fact, I'd go so far as to say it is the one of the funniest podcasts I've ever listened to." Durant concluded, "The chaotic humor of the series lends the show a realism that really makes you feel like you're sitting around the table with a bunch of old mates. It's just damn good fun, plain and simple. Thoroughly recommended, and not just for D&D buffs."

== Live shows and other media ==
=== Live performances ===
Since 2023, Dungeons & Daddies has sold out multiple national and international live theatre tours featuring actual play RPG comedy performances and music from the podcast.

=== Books and publishing ===
Since 2020, Dungeons & Daddies has published and released multiple zines featuring art and fiction pieces from the cast and fandom, initially available on Patreon and eventually sold on their official website.

In May 2026, a Dungeons & Daddies tabletop RPG sourcebook was announced. On July 21st, Dungeons & Daddies: Not a BDSM Sourcebook was launched as a crowdfund on BackerKit, reaching $1.1 million dollars in less than 24 hours. The book campaign went on to raise nearly $3.2 million dollars for its initial publication.

=== Original music ===
Dungeons & Daddies has produced two music albums based on songs and comedy from the show. Released in 2020, Rocks Rock! purports to be a geology-themed educational rap-rock album written by the Season One character Henry Oak. Released in 2023, Sophomore Slump is an angsty high school garage rock-inspired album from the perspective of the goth teen Scary Marlowe, a character from Season Two. Both albums were released on vinyl and digital formats.

== Awards ==
At the 2019 AudioVerse Awards, Dungeons & Daddies won the award for "New Improvised Production", and Anthony Burch won the award for "Player Direction of a New Production".
