= Heart: The City Beneath =

Tabletop role-playing game

- Designers: Grant Howitt and Christopher Taylor
- Publishers: Rowan, Rook & Decard
- Publication: 2020
- Genres: tabletop role-playing game
- Chance: High

Heart: The City Beneath is a tabletop role-playing game about surreal underground labyrinths, designed by Grant Howitt and Christopher Taylor. It shares a setting with Spire: The City Must Fall.

== Gameplay ==
The game uses ten-sided dice in dice pools. Failure results in added stress.

== Reception ==
Heart: The City Beneath was funded by a 2019 Kickstarter that raised £99,612 from 2,448 backers. The game won seven ENNIE Awards in 2021: Gold ENnies for Best Setting, Best Writing and Best Layout, and Silver ENnies for Best Art, Best Art - Interior, Best Game, and Best Monster/Adversary. It was also nominated for Product of the Year.

Kristina Manente for Syfy recommended it for fans of dark fantasy. Robin Valentine for PC Gamer listed it as one of the best alternatives to Dungeons & Dragons.
