= The Two Princes =

Fantasy action adventure podcast

- Genre: Fantasy; LGBT romance; Fantasy podcast

Cast and voices
- Starring: Noah Galvin; Ari'el Stachel

Publication
- No. of seasons: 3
- No. of episodes: 21
- Original release: June 4, 2019 – October 20, 2020
- Provider: Gimlet Media

Related
- Website: gimletmedia.com/shows/the-two-princes

The Two Princes is a scripted fantasy action adventure podcast from Gimlet Media. It was created and written by Kevin Christopher Snipes and directed by Mimi O'Donnell. The story focuses on two princes from warring kingdoms who become unwitting allies when they journey into a mysterious forest in order to try and save their realms. Along the way, the two heroes fall in love with each other.

== Cast ==
The official cast was revealed on May 23, 2019.

- Noah Galvin as Prince Rupert of the West
- Ari'el Stachel as Prince Amir of the East
- Christine Baranski as Queen Lavinia of the West
- Shohreh Aghdashloo as Queen Atossa of the East
- Samira Wiley as Joan
- Alfredo Narciso as Barabbas and The Lord Hieronymus Chamberlain
- Mandi Masden as Lady Cecily and Crazy Tooth
- Richard Kind as Cedric Strangelove
- Matthew Rhys as Sir Percy
- Omar Metwally as The King of the East
- Sean Pertwee as The King of the West
- Laura Benanti as Flora
- Daphne Rubin-Vega as Arachne
- C. J. Wilson as Brutus
- Cynthia Erivo as Queen Malkia of the Midlands
- Tonya Pinkins as Upendo
- Gideon Glick as Percy Junior
- Ali Stroker as Lorelei
- Michael Braun as The Hydra
- Kathryn Kates as The Barkeep
- Jonah Fields as Wenceslaus
- Wesley Taylor as Prince Darling of the North

== Episodes ==
All episodes of season one were released on June 4, 2019, and all episodes of season two were released on December 11, 2019. The third season was released on October 20, 2020.

Season One
Episode	Title	Original Release Date
Teaser	Introducing: The Two Princes	May 20, 2019
1	Once Upon a Time	June 4, 2019
2	Prince and Thief	June 4, 2019
3	Cracking Up and Crashing Down	June 4, 2019
4	Life Upon the Wicked Stage	June 4, 2019
5	That Sinking Feeling	June 4, 2019
6	The Battle of the Phoenix	June 4, 2019
7	The Hollow of the Kings	June 4, 2019
8	How to Ruin a Royal Wedding	December 11, 2019
9	The Woman of the Wolves	December 11, 2019
10	The Play's The Thing	December 11, 2019
11	The Song of the Sirens	December 11, 2019
12	The Seventh Riddle	December 11, 2019
13	Holding Out for a Hero	December 11, 2019
14	Lost and Found	December 11, 2019
15	Happily Ever After	October 20, 2020
16	Something's Coming	October 20, 2020
17	Adventures in Babysitting	October 20, 2020
18	The Enemy Within	October 20, 2020
19	Love is a Battlefield	October 20, 2020
20	The Three Princes	October 20, 2020
21	The Song of the Heartland	October 20, 2020

== Reception ==
The Guardian named The Two Princes as the Week's Best Home Entertainment for June 2019. It later named the show one of the Six Best Serialized Podcasts of 2019.

Podcast reviewer Wil Williams wrote positively about The Two Princes, stating that while it "isn't perfect, it is fun, sweet and incredibly enjoyable", citing the "high genre, borderline camp setup" and "fantastical plot" alongside a "contemporary sense of humor" as reasons why she believes the podcast works so well. Williams praised the "star-studded" cast, explain that she found herself "laughing out loud throughout the entire first season" and adding that there is "a feeling of joy that comes through in each performance" and that "every actor not only commits, no matter how silly the role, but commits so gleefully, it's infectious and is one of the key reasons The Two Princes is so genuinely charming". The romance between the two leads was also praised with the reviewer noting that "the tropes here don't make the romance feel cheesy or contrived, especially in the familiar trappings of the fairytale. Instead, they feel familiar enough to sink into, a sort of predictability that feels comforting versus boring. The Two Princes isn't trying to reinvent the wheel. It's trying to let a marginalized group actually take that wheel for once". Although critical of the sound design which felt "inorganic and impersonal", Williams concluded that the podcast is "sweet and fun in a way LGBTQ+ audiences don't often get to hear" and admitted that she "powered through the first season in a day and immediately wanted more".

The Nerd Daily provided 7 reasons to listen to The Two Princes: "A truly epic LGBTQ+ romance that ends happily, a dragon named Porridge, strong female characters, complex parent/child relationship that's handled exceptionally well, the sound effects really stand out, the narrative never gets overwhelming, and all the members of the star-studded cast deliver delightful performances!"

== Adaptation ==
In February 2020, Deadline reported that Spotify was in talks with HBO Max to adapt The Two Princes into an hour-long animated TV special, though several other parties were also interested in developing the special. Original writer Kevin Snipes is set to work on the adaptation but it has not yet been announced whether the voice cast will reprise their roles. Warner Bros. Animation will animate the special, which will be produced by Chris Giliberti and Justin McGoldrick from Gimlet Media. There has been no new information since then.

== See also ==
- Fantasy podcast
- List of LGBT characters in radio and podcasts
