= Ari'el Stachel =

American actor (born 1991)

- אריאל סטאצ'ל
- Stachel in 2026
- Born: July 29, 1991 (age 35); Berkeley, California, U.S.
- Education: New York University (BFA)
- Occupations: Actor, singer
- Years active: 2014–present

Ari'el Stachel (born July 29, 1991) is an American actor. He won the 2018 Tony Award for Featured Actor in a Musical for his role in The Band's Visit.

== Early life ==
Stachel was born and raised in Berkeley, California. His father, Aaron Yeshayahu, the son of Yemenite Jewish immigrants, was born and raised in Israel; his mother, Laura Stachel, is an Ashkenazi Jew from New York. The two met while at Jewish yiddish folk dancing in San Francisco.

Stachel has said that while growing up, he was uncomfortable with his ethnic heritage. His parents divorced when he was young, and he chose to use his mother's last name in part to avoid being associated with his father's Middle Eastern background. He was in fifth grade when the 9/11 terror attacks occurred, and rather than be mistakenly identified as part Arab, he told friends he was half Black. As a teenager, he avoided being seen in public with his father, and even excluded him from his high school graduation, as he "didn’t want to be seen with somebody who looked like an Arab." He finally embraced his heritage after being cast in The Band's Visit.

Stachel had his first role in a school musical at age 15, after which he left Berkeley High School to attend the Oakland School for the Arts. He went on to study drama at the NYU Tisch School of the Arts.

== Career ==
Following graduation, Stachel landed several stage roles and appeared on the CBS drama Blue Bloods and the Netflix series Jessica Jones before reading the script for The Band's Visit. He auditioned seven times over nine months before landing the role, for which he received Lortel Award and Drama Desk Award nominations before winning the Tony Award. In an emotional acceptance speech, Stachel thanked his parents and acknowledged his long struggle to accept his heritage. He stated, "I want any kid that's watching to know that your biggest obstacle may turn into your purpose." In 2019, Stachel began starring in the LGBTQ+ fantasy podcast The Two Princes as Prince Amir.

In 2020, Stachel became a recurring cast member on Law & Order: Special Victims Unit as Sergeant Hasim Khaldun.

Stachel appeared in the 2021 film Zola as Sean, the title character's fiancé.

In 2020, Stachel was set to appear in a starring role alongside David Hyde Pierce in The Public Theater's new musical adaptation of the 2007 film The Visitor. Stachel was cast to play the character of Tarek, an undocumented Syrian refugee. Stachel publicly discussed his frustration over his character’s accent. During an interview with Playbill, Stachel stated his intent to "speak English without any hint that [his character] was not raised in the United States," unlike in the original film. Due to COVID-19 pandemic lockdowns, the show’s Off-Broadway premiere was postponed. A few weeks into lockdowns, The Public Theater released a video of a musical number from the show that featured lead vocals from Stachel. By October 2021, the show was set to return to the stage for its official opening. However, a few days before previews were slated to begin, the show was delayed to address depictions of race and Arab-American representation. A few days later, it was announced that Stachel and The Public Theater's leadership had made a “mutual decision” that Stachel, who is Jewish, would depart the production. Stachel was replaced by his understudy, Ahmad Maksoud.

Stachel wrote and performed a one-man show titled "Out of Character," which was directed by Tony Taccone and ran at the Unicorn Theatre in Stockbridge, Massachusetts in 2025. The play dealt with Stachel's struggles with his complicated ethnic and religious identity, and his struggles with anxiety. In September 2025 it was announced that LaChanze Productions would be bringing his show to Off-Broadway under a new name. Now known as Other, the show opened on October 19, 2025 as a limited engagement at the Greenwich House Theatre and ran through December 6.

== Personal life ==
Stachel is in a relationship with KiKi Layne, whom he met on the set of Don't Worry Darling in the fall of 2020.

== Filmography ==
=== Film ===
Year	Title	Role	Notes
2020	Zola	Sean	
2022	Don't Worry Darling	Ted	

=== Television ===
Year	Title	Role	Notes
2015	Blue Bloods	Chuck Murtaugh	Episode: "Rush to Judgment"
2015	Jessica Jones	Victor	Episode: "AKA You're a Winner!"
2019	Billions	Brian Dana	Episode: "Infinite Game"
2020–2022	Law & Order: Special Victims Unit	Sergeant Hasim Khaldun	6 episodes
2025	The Night Agent	Artoun	3 episodes

== Stage credits ==
Year	Title	Role	Venue	Ref.
2016	The Band's Visit	Haled	Off-Broadway, Atlantic Theatre Company	
2017	The Band's Visit	Haled	Broadway, Ethel Barrymore Theatre	
2025	Other	Actor	Off-Broadway, Greenwich House Theatre	

== Awards and nominations ==
Year	Award	Category	Work	Result	Ref.
2017	Drama Desk Award	Outstanding Featured Actor in a Musical	The Band's Visit	Nominated	
2017	Lucille Lortel Award	Outstanding Featured Actor in a Musical	The Band's Visit	Nominated	
2018	Tony Award	Best Featured Actor in a Musical	The Band's Visit	Won	
2019	Grammy Award	Best Musical Theater Album	The Band's Visit	Won	
2019	Daytime Emmy Award	Outstanding Musical Performance in a Daytime Program (with the cast of The Band's Visit)	The Band's Visit	Won	
2026	Drama League Award	Distinguished Performance	Other	Nominated	
