= The Far Meridian =

Magic realism podcast

- Genre: Magic realism
- Language: English

Creative team
- Created by: Eli Barraza
- Written by: Eli Barraza
- Directed by: Mischa Stanton, Eli Barraza, Danielle Shemaiah

Publication
- No. of seasons: 2
- No. of episodes: Main: 28; Bonus: 7
- Original release: 25 May 2018 – TBA
- Provider: The Whisperforge
- Updates: Alternating Mondays

Related
- Website: The Far Meridian official website

The Far Meridian is a podcast following the protagonist Peri, who wakes one day to find that her home, a lighthouse, has moved. It is written and created by Eli Barraza and is the second podcast produced by the Whisperforge podcast collective, which has also produced ars Paradoxica, StarTripper!!, Caravan, Remarkable Provinces, and Brimstone Valley Mall. The podcast is directed by Eli Barraza, Danielle Shemaiah, and Mischa Stanton, and the sound design is by Mischa Stanton. The opening and closing theme is "Window" by The Album Leaf. The genre has been described as both magical realism and "hopepunk".

== Content ==
=== Synopsis ===
The Far Meridian is a series of vignettes following Peri, short for Hesperia, as she adjusts to her lighthouse disappearing every sunset and reappearing in a new location at sunrise. The podcast is episodic, with Peri visiting new locations and meeting new people as she searches for her missing brother, Ace.

=== Characters ===
- Hesperia (Peri) – voiced by Eli Barraza
- Horace (Ace) – voiced by Noah Gildermaster
- Ruth – voiced by Danielle Shemaiah
- Benicio (Benny) – José Donado
- The Tattered Woman – Lily Richards

== Accolades ==
=== The Audioverse Awards ===
Year	Category	Recipient	Result	Ref
2017	Best New, Ongoing, Dramatic Production	The Far Meridian	Won	
2017	Best Actress in a Leading Role for a New, Ongoing, Dramatic Production	Eli Barraza	Won	
2017	Best Audio Engineering for a New, Ongoing, Dramatic Production	Mischa Stanton	Won	
2018	Best Ongoing, Short-form, Dramatic Production	The Far Meridian	Won	
2018	Best Audio Engineering of an Ongoing, Short-form, Dramatic Production	Mischa Stanton	Won	
