= Love and Luck (podcast) =

Fantasy podcast

- Genre: LGBTQ+; Drama; Love story
- Language: English

Production
- Length: 5–15 minutes

Publication
- Original release: August 12, 2017
- Provider: Passer Vulpes Productions

Related
- Related shows: Kalila Stormfire's Economical Magick Services; Alba Salix, Royal Physician; The Far Meridian; Making Gay History
- Website: www.loveandluckpodcast.com

Love and Luck is a fictional queer love story set in Melbourne, Australia. The show is hosted by Erin Kyan and produced by Passer Vulpes Productions.

== Background ==
The show is produced by Lee Davis-Thalbourne and Erin Kyan who describes themself as a "fat, queer, disabled, trans man". The show follows the fictional relationship of Jason and Kane through their voicemail. As the story progresses the two characters learn that they have magical abilities. The first season contained forty-eight episodes. The show stopped producing episodes during the COVID-19 pandemic, but later produced an episode about the characters experiences with the isolation imposed by the pandemic.

== Cast and characters ==
- Erin Kyan as Jason Flint
- Lee Davis-Thalbourne as Kane Baxter
- Nicola Rummery as Julie Baxter
- DL Turnbull as Victor
- Ashe Connor as Helen
- Justin Jones Li as Ricardo
- Tahlia Celenn as Mira
- Creatrix Tiara as Storm
- Oscar Sabogal as Michael
- Jai Moore as CJ/Cindy
- Abigail Michell as Eileen
- Shelley Dunlop as Maggie
- Ben Harberts as News Anchor
- Gemma Mahadeo as Priya Singh

== Reception ==
The show was one of the Emerging Writers' Festival recommendations. Peter Wells wrote in the Sydney Morning Herald that "Love and Luck is a breath of fresh air". The show was a finalist in the Australian Podcast Awards for "Best Fiction Podcast".
