= Imaginary Worlds (podcast) =

Fantasy podcast

- Genre: Science fiction podcast; fantasy podcast
- Format: Audio
- Language: English

Cast and voices
- Hosted by: Eric Molinsky

Production
- Length: 15-30 mins.

Technical specifications
- Audio format: MP3

Publication
- No. of episodes: 167
- Original release: September 10, 2014 – present
- Provider: Independent
- Updates: Bi-weekly

Related
- Website: www.imaginaryworldspodcast.org

Imaginary Worlds is an episodic science fiction and fantasy podcast that deconstructs the genres and their themes.

== History ==
Podcast creator and host Eric Molinsky worked in public radio at WNYC and NPR, but was drawn to podcasting because of the freedom it provided the host. Molinsky deconstructs fantasy and science fiction stories and examines the real-world influences and implications.

== Format ==
The podcast releases content on a bi-weekly basis and is an interview style or talk show format. The podcast format has been described as documentary style or a non-fiction analysis of fictional works.

== Reception ==
Imaginary Worlds was on the 2016 list of best podcasts published by Business Insider. The podcast was also a 2017 top pick by The Christian Science Monitor. Charles Pulliam-Moore of Gizmodo included the podcast on a list of ten sci-fi and fantasy podcasts. Miranda Sawyer of The Guardian recommended the podcast saying that "Eric Molinsky is a clever and generous host who knows his stuff, and, at their heart, these shows explore just why we need and want worlds that don't exist."

== See also ==
- Fantasy podcast
