= Hello from the Magic Tavern =

Improvised comedy podcast

- Hello from the Magic Tavern logo
- Genre: Improvisational; comedy; fantasy podcast
- Country of origin: United States
- Language: English

Production
- Production: Arnie Niekamp, Evan Jacover, Ryan DiGiorgi, Matt Young, Adal Rifai
- Length: 30–60 minutes (approximate)

Technical specifications
- Audio format: MP3

Publication
- Original release: March 9, 2015
- Provider: Magic Tavern, LLC
- Updates: Weekly (Mondays)

Reception
- Cited as: One of iTunes' Best Podcasts of 2015

Related
- Website: hellofromthemagictavern.com

Hello from the Magic Tavern is an improvised comedy podcast hosted and produced by Arnie Niekamp, Matt Young, and Adal Rifai. The podcast is set in the fictional world of Foon, a magical realm where a fictionalized version of Niekamp is trapped after falling through a dimensional rift in Chicago. Niekamp and his co-hosts—a wizard named Usidore the Blue (Young), and a shapeshifter, Chunt (Rifai)—interview various magical creatures at the Vermillion Minotaur later relocating to the Strange Familiar tavern. The first episode was released in March 2015. New episodes are released every Monday.

Niekamp, Young, Rifai, and many of their guests are regulars of the Chicago improv comedy community. The podcast has generated a strong fanbase and received generally positive reviews. iTunes has named it as one of the Best Podcasts of 2015 and The Guardian ranked it one of the "10 best new podcasts of 2015 (that aren't Serial)."

== Concept ==
Hello from the Magic Tavern is hosted by a fictionalized version of Arnie Niekamp, who fell into a trans-dimensional portal behind a Burger King restaurant in Chicago and landed in Foon, a magical land in the style of Narnia or Middle-Earth. Although unable to return to Earth, Arnie starts a podcast using equipment that he happened to have with him and a weak Wi-Fi signal from the Burger King through the portal to teach people of Earth about Foon. He is joined each week by co-hosts Usidore the Blue (Matt Young), a wizard, and Chunt (Adal Rifai), a shapeshifter who is in the form of a badger for most of the podcast.

The podcast is recorded in The Vermilion Minotaur, a tavern located in a town called Hogsface near McShingleshane Forest. Each week, Arnie, Usidore, and Chunt interview magical creatures to introduce the listener to new aspects of the world of Foon. The town of Hogsface was destroyed at the end of season 2, so as of season 3 the group travels around Foon in a quest to defeat the Dark Lord.

Real-life fans and listeners of the podcast can interact with the characters by sending email messages to Arnie and Chunt (some of which are read on the show) and through in-character Twitter accounts set up for Usidore and Chunt. A Discord server is also available for Patreon backers.

== Production ==
The podcast was conceived by Arnie Niekamp, who said he enjoyed podcasts that felt like a "laid-back chat show" and relished the idea of introducing a "really weird story". He said that a podcast had to "do something sort of high-concept or a little more niche" to distinguish itself and be successful. Niekamp pitched the idea of the podcast to Matt Young and Adal Rifai, who ultimately became his co-hosts. The trio recorded a pair of "test episodes" to ensure the concept worked, and they eventually became the first two episodes of the actual podcast.

Niekamp, Young, and Rifai are improv comedians from the Chicago area who have performed together for more than a decade prior to Hello From the Magic Tavern. They worked together on the weekly satire show Whirled News Tonight at the iO Theater, in which they would improvise scenes based on newspaper clippings. Nearly all of the guest stars interviewed on the podcast each week are also improv comedians from Chicago.

== Cast ==
=== Regular cast ===
- Arnie Niekamp as a fictionalized version of himself. Arnie is the host of the podcast. The character is an audience surrogate who leads the podcast's interviews and guides listeners through the magical land of Foon, and also often serves as the straight man to Usidore and Chunt. The real Niekamp had previously hosted other comedic podcasts prior to Hello From the Magic Tavern, and is a writer for the video games You Don't Know Jack and Fibbage, both by Jackbox Games.
- Adal Rifai as Chunt, a shapeshifter who usually takes the form of a badger. During the show's earlier episodes, Rifai moved to Chicago to pursue acting and received a scholarship to The Second City improvisational comedy school. His classmates there encouraged him to enroll in classes at the iO Theater. After graduating there, he was placed on a few improv teams, and eventually began performing at the Whirled News Tonight. Rifai, along with Erin Kief and John Patrick Coan, both of whom have guested on Hello from the Magic Tavern, hosts another comedy podcast called Hey Riddle Riddle.
- Matt Young as Usidore the Blue, a loud and boisterous wizard who constantly speaks of his quest to defeat a villain named "the Dark Lord". In each episode, he introduces himself by his extremely-long full name: "I am Usidore! Wizard of the 12th Realm of Ephysiyies, Master of Light and Shadow, Manipulator of Magical Delights, Devourer of Chaos, Champion of the Great Halls of Terr’akkas. The elves know me as Fi’ang Yalok. The dwarves know me as Zoenen Hoogstandjes. And I am also known in the Northeast as Gaismunēnas Meistar." Young also appears in the comedic podcast Improvised Star Trek.
- Tim Sniffen as the Mysterious Man, an unidentified announcer living on a space station who records introductions and outros for each episode of the podcast, explaining to listeners that the podcast is entirely fictional. Arnie, Chunt, and Usidore have no knowledge of the Man or his messages, and when questioned about it through emails answered on the podcast they believe that the emails were sent to the wrong address. The show often implies that the Man is not actually human; multiple references have been made to unconventional anatomy, such as a carapace. It was revealed in season 3 that the Man lived on Earth as one of Arnie's neighbors during the 1980s.

=== Recurring guest stars ===
- Nick Baer as Otok Barleyfoot, the owner of The Vermilion Minotaur, who allows Arnie, Usidore, and Chunt to record their podcast in his establishment and is a sponsor of the podcast.
- Martin Wilson as Blemish, a creepy half-dwarf employee of The Vermilion Minotaur.
- Charlie McCrackin as Spintax the Green/The Pandenomicon, a wizard whom Usidore considers a rival. The Pandenomicon is utilized as a sentient encyclopedia.
- Nick Gage and Meredith Stepien as Glenn Miller and Spants, two traveling bards who travel throughout Foon performing songs.
- Sean Kelley as Jak Vorpal, the greatest swordsman in Foon. Kelley appears with Young in the podcast Improvised Star Trek.
- Brooke Breit as Flower, a foul-mouthed talking flower.
- Tom Gottlieb as Bungaree Chubbins, the owner of Chubbins Chamber Pots and a sponsor of the podcast.
- Erin Kief as Momo, a mouse with human strength.
- Kate James as Tricia, one of a series of clones that intern in the Mysterious Man's space station.
- Ryan DiGiorgi as Craig, a vending machine technician who finds himself stuck and now working in the Mysterious Man's space station. Craig was later revealed to be a robot, and during season 3 he was removed from the main show's roster, instead introducing episodes of the spinoff podcasts available on the show's Patreon.
- Sarah Maher as a fictionalized version of herself. She was Arnie's wife. After an attempt by Usidore to send Arnie back home backfires and has Arnie and Sarah briefly switch places, Sarah's week in Foon ends with the two re-swapping places, and losing their memories of their times swapped, though Sarah now has a psychic connection with Usidore.
- Marla Caceres and Eddie Piña as Inta and Nerf: A goblin couple, with 47 kids. They and their children were accidentally teleported to Chicago when Sarah was sent back.
- Chris Rathjen as Baron Ragoon: Loyal follower of the Dark Lord. Rathjen appears with Young on the "Improvised Star Trek".

== Reception ==
Hello from the Magic Tavern has generated a fanbase, particularly through social media platforms like Reddit and Tumblr. The show has received generally positive reviews, and was named one of iTunes' best podcasts of 2015. The Guardian also ranked it one of the "10 best new podcasts of 2015 (that aren't Serial)". Guardian writer Melissa Locker called the show "unabashedly goofy" and "incredibly entertaining and binge-worthy", particularly praising the comedic chemistry of Niekamp, Young, and Rifai.

The A.V. Club also ranked it among the best podcasts of 2015, and declared the Vermilion Minotaur the "best fictional place we want to go to." Writer Ben Cannon called the podcast Hello From the Magic Tavern "comic podcasting's most continually rewarding achievement", and praised it for its worldbuilding abetted by consistent callbacks to jokes and references from past episodes. He added, "There is simply no other podcast recording today which contains as vast and vivid a collection of fantastic oddities as Hello From The Magic Tavern."

NPR's Pop Culture Happy Hour included the 59th episode "Dr Ward" among its Favorite Podcast Episodes Of 2016. Panelist and author Glen Weldon states that "Ok, yes, I've talked about this podcast a lot. And Linda, Stephen and I even appeared on it once. But this episode represents such a hugely satisfying listen I had to include it. HOWEVER. It's not an episode to jump in on. Instead, I'd recommend starting with the very first episode, to determine if it's your thing. If it is, this episode, which arrives after the show's been building out its huge, improv-driven world for over a year, cracks open everything that came before in a rich and powerful way. To say how it does this would spoil it."

Max Temkin, co-creator of the card game Cards Against Humanity, has been a strong proponent of the show, calling it in a blog entry "probably my favorite comedy thing happening right now". He said the show is effective because of the "special comedy relationship" of Niekamp, Young, and Rifai, of whom he said, "their instincts are incredible, and they have the kind of rapport that only comes from a decade of working together."

Steve Guntli of The Northern Light praised the show's consistency and world-building, which he said makes Foon "feel like a real and lived-in place." He also praised the voice acting, particularly the performance of Matt Young, who he said plays Usidore to "pompous perfection."

== See also ==
- Fantasy podcast
