= Hey Riddle Riddle =

Comedy podcast

- Genre: Comedy
- Country of origin: United States
- Language: English

Cast and voices
- Hosted by: Adal Rifai; John Patrick Coan; Erin Keif

Publication
- Original release: July 25, 2018
- Provider: Headgum

Related
- Website: www.heyriddleriddle.com

Hey Riddle Riddle is a comedy podcast about puzzles and riddles. The hosts are Erin Keif, John Patrick Coan, and Adal Rifai. The show is produced by Headgum. The show contains improv based on the puzzles and riddles presented to the hosts. Each episode consists of multiple riddles and puzzles, but the number and length of each varies depending on the episode. The first episode of the podcast was titled "Stuck In The Riddle With You". The podcast won a 2022 Podcast Award and was a finalist for a 2020 Discover Pods Award.

== Guest stars ==
- Arnie Niekamp (Episode 8: My Riddle Pony)
- Justin McElroy (Episode 12: Three Men and A Riddle Lady)
- Brooke Breit (Episode 21: Jester Tester)
- Zach Reino (Episode 24: Hey Year's Re:SOLUTIONS!, Episode 259: Go and Be Good, Episode 370, Little Miss 2nd Breakfast)
- Jess McKenna (Episode 24: Hey Year's Re:SOLUTIONS!, Episode 259: Go and Be Good)
- Becca Barish (Episode 29: Dungeons & Dragons & Riddles, Episode 229: Paul Turkey Mall Turkey)
- Jon Gabrus (Episode 45: Lucky Songbird!, Episode 428: The Snorkeling Pervert)
- Hayes Davenport (Episode 48: Boat Detective, Episode 318: Hat Pack)
- Janet Varney (Episode 51: JANETMORPH!, Episode 178: ... and Whatnot, Episode 189: Escape!, Episode 200: John Travolta's Half Birthday, Episode 221: Planchette Poltergeist, Episode 253: Are Grandmas Lisas?, Episode 276: Rayzle Dayzle, Episode 296: Skip this one!, Episode 297: There's No Rules That Say A Dog Can't Not Do Riddles, Episode 315: Daisy in the Naisy, Episode 329: New Old Man Puzzles, Episode 392, Wrist Cyst, Episode 402: Imagining a Dune Buggy, Episode 425: JeopRiddie!)
- Jeffrey Cranor (Episode 54: A Star Is Wars!, Episode 197: Leprechaun Lingerie)
- The Teachers Lounge (Episode 57: The Question Is The Answer!)
- Demi Adejuyigbe (Episode 92: Unicorn Boner)
- Geoffrey James (Episode 105: Milk Store)
- Reilly Anspaugh (Episode 105: Milk Store, Episode 240: Butt. Teeth. Brains.)
- Freddie Wong (Episode 112: Riddies & Daddies)
- Beth May (Episode 112: Riddies & Daddies)
- Will Campos (Episode 112: Riddies & Daddies)
- Mary Holland (Episode 115: Bug!)
- Dan Lippert (Episode 124: Big Grande Part 1, Episode 211: Or Else Forget About It!)
- Drew Tarver (Episode 124: Big Grande Part 1)
- Ryan Rosenberg (Episode 124.5: Big Grande Part 2, Episode 211: Or Else Forget About It!, Episode 323: Sexy Reading)
- Jon Mackey (Episode 124.5: Big Grande Part 2, Episode 270L Guess This Mess, Episode 415 New Voice, Who Dis?)
- Branson Reese (Episode 168: Riddles Tales of Magic)
- Carly Monardo (Episode 168: Riddles Tales of Magic)
- Holly Laurent (Episode 169: Edward Splinterhands, Episode 417: Two Little Twinkie Boats)
- Greg Hess (Episode 169: Edward Splinterhands)
- Johnny O'Mara (Episode 185: Dr. Very Good Body)
- Elizabeth Andrews (Episode 187: Edge of the Couch)
- Michael Hitchcock (Episode 205: The Ol' Happy Cabbage, Episode 247: Hollywood Hot Takes)
- Emily Gonzalez (Episode 212: Too Riddies; Didn't Puzzies)
- Kyle Ayers (Episode 224: Duckman Joe Millionaire)
- Sandy Weisz (Episode 226: SANDY?!)
- Thomas Sanders (Episode 236: Thomas the Riddle Engine)
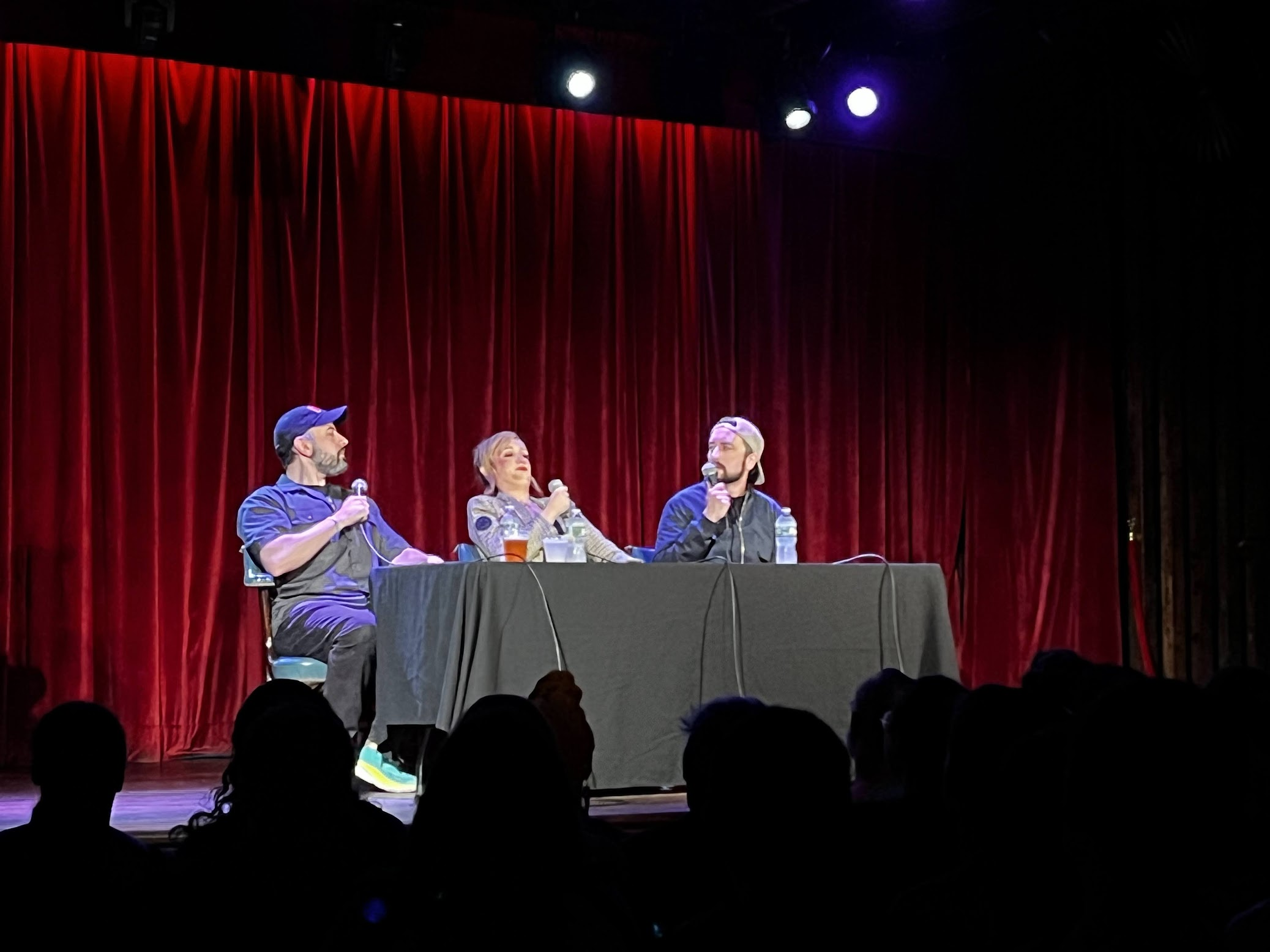
  Hey Riddle Riddle at The Bell House in October 2024
- Alfred Bardwell-Evans (Episode 240: Butt. Teeth. Brains.)
- Jasper Cartwright (Episode 242: Cool Ranch Latte)
- Mano Agapion (Episode 246: Hey Factoid Factoid)
- Mark McConville (Episode 260: Garson Arson Larson)
- Tim Platt (Episode 262: Mummy Issues)
- Ali Fisher (Episode 262: Mummy Issues)
- Peih-Gee Law (Episode 266: SAW(LVE))
- Joe Lepore (Episode 267: Tub Gin & Flagons)
- Christopher Hastings (Episode 267: Tub Gin & Flagons)
- David Brown (Episode 270: Guess This Mess)
- Seth Morris (Episode 271: BudWizArd)
- Ian Karmel (Episode 273: Three Donatellos)
- Erin Whitehead (Episode 281: A Tale of Two Erins)
- Jordan Morris (Episode 294: Never Stand Behind a Batman)
- Casey Toney (Episode 295: Can You See My Muscles Through the Phone?)
- Josh Gondelman (Episode 298: 2 Hams in a Clam, Episode 368: Swan Dong, Episode 418: Catcel Culture)
- Anthony Burch (Episode 308: PsyCoco, Episode 367: 7 Year Anniversary!)
- Rekha Shankar (Episode 209: I'm Actually Quite Cool!)
- Katie Rich (Episode 312: Answer Hogs, Episode 417: Two Little Twinkie Boats)
- Paul F. Tompkins (Episode 315: Daisy in the Naisy)
- Vic Michaelis (Episode 316: The Birth Order Game)
- Niccole Thurman (Episode 317: Steam In Two!)
- Sean Clements (Episode 318: Hat Pack)
- Luke Null (Episode 319: I'm A Frumpster Man, Myself, Episode 348: The Three Shaqs of Riddles)
- Brennan Lee Mulligan (Episode 320: Horton Stands His Ground)
- Nnamdi Ngwe (Episode 321: No Cheese Please
- Allison Reese (Episode 322: Shreked by Lightning)
- Brendan Jennings (Episode 324: Rambling Goo)
- Mark Raterman (Episode 324: Rambling Goo)
- Paul Sabourin (Episode 329: New Old Man Puzzles)
- Colin Mochrie (Episode 331: There Goes My Isaac Streak)
- Paul Scheer (Episode 337: Kite Flub)
- Elliott Kalan (Episode 338: Fiddler On the Dune)
- Elyse Willems (Episode 341: Sex at the Swim Hotel)
- Betsy Sodaro (Episode 347: Greetings From Santorini!)
- Marcy Jarreau (Episode 347: Greetings From Santorini!)
- Tony Hale (Episode 353: Rope Bowls)
- Matt Oberg (Episode 355: Hart of Riddixie)
- Paul Rust (Episode 371: Shakira Weekly)
- Neil Campbell (Episode 371: Shakira Weekly)
- Joey Bland (Episode 372: My Hearts Don't Lie)
- Ross Bryant (Episode 376: All Pervert's Eve)
- Will Hines (Episode 424: Boston Superman)
- Amal El-Mohtar (Episode 420: Do it for the Anagram)
- Julian Feeld (Episode 428: The Snorkeling Pervert)

== Episodes ==
Episodes 1-100
Episode	Title	Release date	Guest star
1	Stuck in the Riddle with You	7/25/2018	
2	My Puzzle Lies Over The Ocean	8/1/2018	
3	Everyone's Dead!	8/8/2018	
4	Guilty Beyond a Reasonable Mrs. Doubtfire	8/15/2018	
5	Greased Lightnin' Round	8/22/2018	
6	Sheep Impact!	8/29/2018	
7	Riddle Miss Sunshine	9/5/2018	
8	My Riddle Pony	9/12/2018	Arnie Niekamp
9	Quiz Bop	9/19/2018	
10	Judge, Jury, and Riddlecutioner	9/26/2018	
11	Night of the Living DEAD STOP	10/3/2018	
12	Three Men and A Riddle Lady	10/10/2018	Justin McElroy
13	Throw another Riddie on the Barbie	10/17/2018	
14	A Riddle A Day Saves Nine	10/24/2018	
15	Bleh Riddle Riddle! a.k.a. RiddleWeen	10/31/2018	
16	Riddle Nation	11/7/2018	
17	The Episode That Sounds a Riddle Bit Different	11/14/2018	
18	Hey Gobble Gobble!	11/21/2018	
19	A Puzzle a Day Keeps the Riddle Away	11/28/2018	
20	School Runnings	12/5/2018	
21	Jester Tester	12/12/2018	Brooke Breit
22	Sleigh Riddle Riddle	12/19/2018	
23	A Year End Riddie-view	12/26/2018	
24	New Year's Re:SOLUTIONS!	1/2/2019	Zach Reino, Jess McKenna
25	Puzzies and Wizzys	1/9/2019	
26	Rip Van Puzzies	1/16/2019	
27	Kiss, Kiss, Riddle Riddle	1/23/2019	
28	Thank you, Snake!	1/30/2019	
29	Dungeons & Dragons & Riddles	2/6/2019	Becca Barish
30	Love Arrow Arrow! (AKA Hey Kissy Kissy!)	2/13/2019	
31	Take a Riddle Bit Off the Top!	2/20/2019	
32	LOST Boyz!	2/27/2019	
33	The One With The Most	3/6/2019	
34	The More You Know!	3/13/2019	
35	JUST Trains & Automobiles	3/20/2019	
36	Dear Diary...	3/7/2019	
37	Raccoon Penis Bone!	4/3/2019	
38	The Great Butterbeer Showdown!	4/10/2019	
39	Horse Court	4/17/2019	TJ Jagodowski
40	All Sherlock!	4/24/2019	
41	Dr. Funny Comedy	5/1/2019	
42	Post Potatoes	5/8/2019	
43	He's Mimble!!!	5/15/2019	
44	Adal's $100 Give Away!!!	5/22/2019	
45	Lucky Songbird!	5/29/2019	Jon Gabrus
46	It Came from the Basement!	6/5/2019	
47	Pyramid-Life Crisis!	6/12/2019	
48	Boat Detective	6/19/2019	Hayes Davenport
49	Carrot Bottom!	6/26/2019	
50	Fifty Riddles GUARANTEED!	7/3/2019	
51	JANETMORPH!	7/10/2019	Janet Varney
52	Body Magic!	7/17/2019	
53	It's Been... ONE YEAR!	7/24/2019	
54	A Star is Wars!	7/31/2019	Jeffrey Cranor
55	Just Plain Comedy!	8/7/2019	
56	Hey Riddle City! A Pod Noir, Part 1	8/14/2019	
57	The Question Is The Answer!	8/21/2019	The Teachers Lounge
58	Flirty Chef!	8/28/2019	
59	That Sucks! That Rules!	9/4/2019	
60	Floor Soup!	9/11/2019	
61	Fun At Songs	9/18/2019	
62	Hey Riddle City Part 2!	9/25/2019	
63	A Pun in the Pool	10/2/2019	
64	The Purple Episode	10/9/2019	
65	Watson Can You Hear Me?	10/16/2019	
66	On The Ground, In Disguise	10/23/2019	
67	Bleh Riddle Riddle 2!	10/30/2019	
68	The Birds, the Bees, the Nicholas Cages	11/6/2019	
69	Dirty Sexy Riddles	11/13/2019	
70	Hundie Dollie Giveaway Returns! AKA Rap For Daddy!	11/20/2019	
71	Kid Friendly Episode (really!)	11/27/2019	
72	Skull & Boneheads	12/4/2019	
73	Sharkest Heart	12/11/2019	
74	Booty Butt	12/18/2019	
75	The Night Before Puzzmas w/J.P. Riddles	12/25/2019	
76	How Far Up The Egg Do The Pants Go?	1/1/2020	
77	ON MY GIRLFRIENDS BIRTHDAY???	1/8/2020	
78	James Bond's Cousins	1/15/2020	
79	I Used To Be An Improviser	1/22/2020	
80	Beef Thief!	1/29/2020	
81	Hey Riddle City Part 3!`	2/5/2020	
82	A Female Robot With A Cowboy Hat	2/12/2020	
83	Kiss Your Clone!	2/19/2020	
84	Riddle Me Shakespeare	2/26/2020	
85	EduCake	3/4/2020	
86	Hey Nintendo Cafe!	3/11/2020	
87	Not Enough Buckles	3/18/2020	
88	Sopa De Ropa	3/25/2020	
89	Puzzbot's April Fools	4/1/2020	
90	Bad Riddles Unit	4/8/2020	
91	Gotcha From The Magic Castle	4/15/2020	
92	Unicorn Boner	4/22/2020	Demi Adejuyigbe
93	Smart Dog/Dumb Dog	4/29/2020	
94	Good Will Farting	5/6/2020	
95	Alone Together For The First Time!	5/13/2020	
96	It's Opposite Day	5/20/2020	
97	Take Me To Your Riddles	5/27/2020	
98	Degrees!	6/3/2020	
99	Bottles of Beer on the Wall	6/10/2020	
100	A Hundred Episodes, A Dozen Laughs!	6/17/2020	

Episodes 101-200
Episode	Title	Release date	Guest star
101	All The Mimosas You Can Carry	6/24/2020	
102	We're Buying the Knicks	7/1/2020	
103	Tux On Top. Diaper On Bottom	7/8/2020	
104	The Baron, The Countess and The Fool	7/15/2020	
105	Milk Store	7/22/2020	Geoffrey James Reilly Anspaugh
106	OH YEAH!	7/29/2020	
107	Tell Me Something, College Boy	8/5/2020	
108	We Also Make The Ducks	8/12/2020	
109	Dollar Signs & Question Marks!	8/19/2020	
110	Don't Matter to Me, Broccolis	8/26/2020	
111	The Heart is the Greatest Weapon	9/2/2020	
112	Riddies & Daddies	9/9/2020	Freddie Wong Beth May Will Campos
113	Auto-tune Bird Sounds	9/16/2020	
114	Carl Talk	9/23/2020	
115	Bug!	9/30/2020	Mary Holland
116	Three Butlers Living in the Very Same House	10/7/2020	
117	HARcut	10/14/2020	
118	Slamlet	10/21/2020	
119	Bleh Riddle Riddle 3!	10/28/2020	
120	TWO Harmonica Solos	11/4/2020	
121	Pizza Talk Chony	11/11/2020	
122	Rebel With A Cause!	11/18/2020	Jake & Amir
123	Grandma Puzzles	11/25/2020	
124	Big Grande Part 1!	12/2/2020	Dan Lippert Drew Tarver
124.5	Big Grande Part 2!	12/2/2020	Ryan Rosenberg Jon Mackey
125	The Brunch Bunch	12/09/2020	
126	Seven Seventeen	12/16/2020	
127	Best of 2020	12/23/2020	
128	Those Poor Pigs	12/30/2020	
129	A Diaper and a Sash	1/6/2021	
130	Papa Bear's Honey	1/13/2021	
131	Help... (The Hundie Dollie Giveaway)	1/20/2021	
132	Artificial Sweeteners	1/27/2021	
133	Riddleternational Gibberish	2/3/2021	
134	VelenStein's Monster!	2/10/2021	
135	Cards and Flards	2/17/2021	
136	Frodoian Slip	2/24/2021	
137	The Origin of Snark!	3/3/2021	
138	Nose Fish	3/10/2021	
139	My Honk Will Go On	3/17/2021	
140	The Sweater	3/24/2021	
141	Welcome to the Riddle Dome	3/31/2021	
142	She Was a Secret Genius	4/7/2021	
143	Candle Store	4/14/2021	
144	Flork Family Road Trip	4/21/2021	
145	Suit-Casey	4/28/2021	
146	Second Location	5/5/2021	
147	Leg Day	5/12/2021	
148	Yes and and and and and pie	5/19/2021	
149	JustinVernon42069	5/26/2021	
150	Spice Up Your Life	6/2/2021	
151	The Wheel of Perversion	6/9/2021	
152	Silly Clown Valley!	6/16/2021	
153	Welcome to Jamba Juice	6/23/2021	
154	Beer Up The Bank Tube	6/30/2021	
155	Eat at Tootie Poots!	7/7/2021	
156	Espresso	7/14/2021	
157	Can I Pitch a Podcast	7/21/2021	
158	Three Beer Canniversary!	7/28/2021	
159	HRR Enterprises	8/4/2021	
160	Percy Pig Fun Dippin'	8/11/2021	Max & Ivan
