= Fantasy podcast =

Genre of media

A fantasy podcast is a podcast related to or discussing the fantasy genre, which usually focuses on the magical, supernatural, mythical, or folkloric. Fantasy stories are set in fictional universes or fantasy worlds that are often reminiscent of the Middle Ages and the early modern period. Despite having a fictional setting, fantasy stories can contain or reference locations, events, or people from the real world. Characters in these stories often encounter fictional creatures such as dwarves, elves, dragons, and fairies. Common types of fantasy podcasts are audio dramas, narrated short stories, role-playing games, or discussions and reviews of fantasy topics such as fantasy films, books, games, and other media. The intended audience of a fantasy podcast can vary from young children to adults. Fantasy podcasts emerged from storytelling and the creation of the radio. Fantasy podcasts have often been adapted into television programs, graphic novels, and comics. Fantasy podcasts are a subgenre of fiction podcasts and are distinguished from science fiction podcasts and horror podcasts by the absence of scientific or macabre themes, respectively, though these subgenres regularly overlap.

== Genre ==
As of 2021, The longest running fantasy podcast is PodCastle, which has been actively releasing content since 2007. The most common subgenre of fantasy podcasts is high fantasy, however, other subgenres include urban fantasy, modern fantasy, and dark fantasy.

=== Science fiction and fantasy podcasts ===
The content of fantasy podcasts often overlaps with science fiction podcasts. These two genres are often grouped together under the label science fiction and fantasy podcasts, which is sometimes shortened to sci-fi/fantasy podcasts or simply SFF. Some examples of podcasts that cover both science fiction and fantasy topics include SFF Yeah!, The SFF Audio Podcast, and Sword & Laser. Two of the longest running science fiction and fantasy podcasts, as of 2021, are Sword and Laser and the Clarkesworld Magazine podcast, which have both been regularly releasing episodes since 2008.

== Style ==
=== Audio drama ===
The Two Princes is a popular audio drama style LGBT fantasy podcast. Other fantasy podcasts include Carcerem and Roommate From Hell. Aja Romano, for Vox, compiled a list of seven fantasy audio drama podcasts that included Kalila Stormfire's Economical Magick Services, The Magical History of Knox County, Victoriocity, The Alexandria Archives, Love and Luck, Alba Salix, and Supernatural Sexuality with Dr Seabrooke. Other fantasy audio dramas or audio fiction podcasts include Inn Between, The Once and Future Nerd, The Penumbra Podcast, and The Prickwillow Papers.

=== Narrated short stories ===
Based on an Audio Publishers Association report, the audiobook industry grew thirty-four percent between 2015 and 2016. According to Andrew Liptak, for The Verge, this increasing listenership has contributed to the success of podcasts released by science fiction and fantasy magazines. For instance, the Clarkesworld Magazine releases a science fiction and fantasy podcast containing short stories read by Kate Baker. As opposed to an audio drama, the stories are read by an individual rather than a cast of voice actors. Other example of fantasy magazines that release short stories as podcast episodes include The BCS Audio Vault and PodCastle.

=== Improvisation ===
The fantasy podcast Hello from the Magic Tavern is entirely improvised except for the premise of the fantasy world in which the characters reside. The improv science fiction podcasts Mission to Zyxx and Voyage to the Stars both have fantasy themes.

==== Role-playing games ====
Dungeons & Dragons, a tabletop role-playing game, is often adapted into fantasy podcasts. Marion Frayna, of AsiaOne, recommends learning how to play the game by watching or listening to other people play on live streams (such as Critical Role) or podcasts (such as The Adventure Zone). These fantasy podcasts often include players asking questions and actively learning the rules of the game and regularly involve players making jokes and improvising rather than following a script. Other Dungeons & Dragons role-playing or actual play podcasts include The Broadswords, Rivals of Waterdeep, Tavern Tales Junior, and Roll For Wenches.

Other role-playing game systems have been used to create fantasy podcasts such as Welcome to Warda which uses the Fate system, Queer Dungeoneers which uses Dungeon World, and Very Random Encounters which uses a different role-playing system for each campaign.

=== Discussion and critique ===
Fantasy podcasts such as SFF Yeah! and Sword & Laser cover news of fantasy related media and discuss or review the latest releases. For instance, SFF Yeah! discusses the latest science fiction and fantasy books. Rather than discuss or review fantasy related media, nonfiction podcasts like Imaginary Worlds and Words to That Effect explore, analysis, and deconstruct fantasy worlds and the themes and tropes used in the genre.

== Adaptions ==
Some web series have been adapted into podcast form, including shows such as Critical Role, High Rollers, and Girls, Guts, Glory.

Fantasy podcasts have been adapted into books, comics, and film. For instance, Sword and Laser has been adapted into a book and The Adventure Zone has been adapted into both books and comics. The Two Princes has been adapted into film. Fantasy magazines have been adapted into podcasts or vice versa. For instance, the Clarkesworld Magazine podcast and The BCS Audio Vault produced by Beneath Ceaseless Skies Online Magazine.

Fantasy podcasts have been used by businesses as marketing campaigns to increase brand visibility. For instance, the German software company, SAP, produced a podcast entitled Searching for Salaì.

== See also ==
- Fantasy
- Fantasy film
- Fantasy literature
- List of fantasy podcasts
- Horror podcast
