= Eisner Award for Best Humor Publication =

American comic book award

- Awarded for: Best Humor Publication
- Country: United States
- First award: 1992
- Most recent winner: Physics for Cats, by Tom Gauld
- Website: www.comic-con.org/awards/eisner-awards-current-info

The Eisner Award for Best Humor Publication, established in 1992 as part of the Eisner Awards, is an American comic book award presented annually to recognize creative achievement in humorous graphic novels and comics.

== Winners and nominees ==
| Year | Title | Authors | Publisher | Result | Ref. |
|---|---|---|---|---|---|
2010s
| 2010 | Scott Pilgrim vol. 5: Scott Pilgrim vs. the Universe | Bryan Lee O'Malley | Oni Press | Winner | |
| 2010 | Drinky Crow's Maakies | Tony Millionaire | Fantagraphics | Finalist | |
| 2010 | Everybody Is Stupid Except for Me, And Other Astute Observations | Peter Bagge | Fantagraphics | Finalist | |
| 2010 | Little Lulu, vols. 19-21 | John Stanley and Irving Tripp | Dark Horse | Finalist | |
| 2010 | The Muppet Show Comic Book: Meet the Muppets | Roger Langridge | BOOM Kids! | Finalist | |
| 2011 | I Thought You Would Be Funnier | Shannon Wheeler | BOOM! | Winner | |
| 2011 | Afrodisiac | Jim Rugg and Brian Maruca | Adhouse | Finalist | |
| 2011 | Comic Book Guy: The Comic Book | Ian Boothby, John Delaney, and Dan Davis | Bongo | Finalist | |
| 2011 | Drinking at the Movies | Julia Wertz | Three Rivers Press/Crown | Finalist | |
| 2011 | Literature: Unsuccessfully Competing Against TV since 1953 | Dave Kellett | Small Fish Studios | Finalist | |
| 2011 | Prime Baby | Gene Luen Yang | First Second | Finalist | |
| 2012 | Milk & Cheese: Dairy Products Gone Bad | Evan Dorkin | Dark Horse | Winner | |
| 2012 | The Art of Doug Sneyd: A Collection of Playboy Cartoons | Doug Sneyd | Dark Horse | Finalist | |
| 2012 | Chimichanga | Eric Powell | Dark Horse | Finalist | |
| 2012 | Coffee: It's What's for Dinner | Dave Kellett | Small Fish | Finalist | |
| 2012 | Kinky & Cosy | Nix | NBM | Finalist | |
| 2013 | Darth Vader and Son | Jeffrey Brown | Chronicle | Winner | |
| 2013 | Adventure Time | Ryan North, Shelli Paroline, and Braden Lamb | KaBOOM! | Finalist | |
| 2013 | BBXX: Baby Blues Decades 1&2 | Jerry Scott and Rick Kirkman | Andrews McMeel | Finalist | |
| 2013 | Naked Cartoonists | Gary Groth | Fantagraphics | Finalist | |
| 2014 | Vader's Little Princess | Jeffrey Brown | Chronicle | Winner | |
| 2014 | The Adventures of Superhero Girl | Faith Erin Hicks | Dark Horse | Finalist | |
| 2014 | The Complete Don Quixote | Miguel de Cervantes and Rob Davis | SelfMadeHero | Finalist | |
| 2014 | The (True!) History of Art | Sylvain Coissard and Alexis Lemoine | SelfMadeHero | Finalist | |
| 2014 | You're All Just Jealous of My Jetpack | Tom Gauld | Drawn & Quarterly | Finalist | |
| 2015 | The Complete Cul de Sac | Richard Thompson | Andrews McMeel | Winner | |
| 2015 | Dog Butts and Love. And Stuff Like That. And Cats | Jim Benton | NBM | Finalist | |
| 2015 | Groo vs. Conan | Sergio Aragonés, Mark Evanier, and Tom Yeates | Dark Horse | Finalist | |
| 2015 | Rocket Raccoon | Skottie Young | Marvel | Finalist | |
| 2015 | Superior Foes of Spider-Man | Nick Spencer and Steve Lieber | Marvel | Finalist | |
| 2016 | Step Aside, Pops: A Hark! A Vagrant Collection | Kate Beaton | Drawn & Quarterly | Winner | |
| 2016 | Cyanide & Happiness: Stab Factory | Kris Wilson, Rob DenBleyker, and Dave McElfatrick | BOOM! | Finalist | |
| 2016 | Deep Dark Fears | Fran Krause | Ten Speed Press | Finalist | |
| 2016 | Sexcastle | Kyle Starks | Image | Finalist | |
| 2016 | UR | Eric Haven | AdHouse | Finalist | |
| 2017 | Jughead | Chip Zdarsky, Ryan North, Erica Henderson, Derek Charm | Archie | Winner | |
| 2017 | The Further Fattening Adventure of Pudge, Girl Blimp | Lee Marrs | Marrs Books | Finalist | |
| 2017 | Hot Dog Taste Test | Lisa Hanawalt | Drawn & Quarterly | Finalist | |
| 2017 | Man, I Hate Cursive | Jim Benton | Andrews McMeel | Finalist | |
| 2017 | Yuge! 30 Years of Doonesbury on Trump | G. B. Trudeau | Andrews McMeel | Finalist | |
| 2018 | Baking with Kafka | Tom Gauld | Drawn & Quarterly | Winner | |
| 2018 | Batman/Elmer Fudd Special #1 | Tom King, Lee Weeks, and Byron Vaughn | DC | Finalist | |
| 2018 | The Flinstones | Mark Russell, Steve Pugh, Rick Leonardi, and Scott Hanna | DC | Finalist | |
| 2018 | Rock Candy Mountain | Kyle Starks | Image | Finalist | |
| 2018 | Wallace the Brave | Will Henry | Andrews McMeel | Finalist | |
| 2019 | Giant Days | John Allison, Max Sarin, and Julia Madrigal | BOOM! | Winner | |
| 2019 | Get Naked | Steven T. Seagle | Image | Finalist | |
| 2019 | MAD magazine | Bill Morrison | DC | Finalist | |
| 2019 | A Perfect Failure: Fanta Bukowski 3 | Noah Van Sciver | Fantagraphics | Finalist | |
| 2019 | Woman World | Aminder Dhaliwal | Drawn & Quarterly | Finalist | |
2020s
| 2020 | The Way of the Househusband, vol. 1 | Kousuke Oono, trans. by Sheldon Drzka | VIZ Media | Winner | |
| 2020 | Anatomy of Authors | Dave Kellett | SheldonComics.com | Finalist | |
| 2020 | Death Wins a Goldfish | Brian Rea | Chronicle Books | Finalist | |
| 2020 | Minotäar | Lissa Treiman | Shortbox | Finalist | |
| 2020 | Sobek | James Stokoe | Shortbox | Finalist | |
| 2020 | Wondermark: Friends You Can Ride On | David Malki | Wondermark | Finalist | |
| 2021 | Superman's Pal Jimmy Olsen | Matt Fraction and Steve Lieber | DC Comics | Winner | |
| 2021 | The Complete Fante Bukowski | Noah Van Sciver | Fantagraphics | Finalist | |
| 2021 | Department of Mind-Blowing Theories | Tom Gauld | Drawn & Quarterly | Finalist | |
| 2021 | FANGS | Sarah Andersen | Andrews McMeel | Finalist | |
| 2021 | Wendy, Master of Art | Walter Scott | Drawn & Quarterly | Finalist | |
| 2021 | What If We Were... | Axelle Lenoir | Top Shelf | Finalist | |
| 2022 | Not All Robots | Mark Russell andMike Deodato Jr. | AWA Upshot | Winner | |
| 2022 | Bubble | Jordan Morris, Sarah Morgan, and Tony Cliff | First Second/Macmillan | Finalist | |
| 2022 | Cyclopedia Exotica | Aminder Dhaliwal | Drawn & Quarterly | Finalist | |
| 2022 | The Scumbag | Rick Remender | Image | Finalist | |
| 2022 | Thirsty Mermaids | Kat Leyh | Gallery 13/Simon and Schuster | Finalist | |
| 2022 | Zom 100: Bucket List of the Dead | Haro Aso and Kotaro Takata, trans. by Nova Skipper | VIZ Media | Finalist | |
| 2023 | Revenge of the Librarians | Tom Gauld | Drawn & Quarterly | Winner | |
| 2023 | Cryptid Club | Sarah Andersen | Andrews McMeel | Finalist | |
| 2023 | I Hate This Place | Kyle Starks and Artyom Topilin | Image Skybound | Finalist | |
| 2023 | Killer Queens | David Booher and Claudia Balboni | Dark Horse | Finalist | |
| 2023 | Mr. Lovenstein Presents: Failure | J. L. Westover | Image Skybound | Finalist | |
| 2024 | It's Jeff: The Jeff-Verse #1 | Kelly Thompson and Gurihiru | Marvel | Winner | |
| 2024 | How to Love: A Guide to Feelings & Relationships for Everyone | Alex Norris | Candlewick/Walker Books | Finalist | |
| 2024 | I Was a Teenage Michael Jackson Impersonator, and Other Musical Meanderings | Keith Knight | Keith Knight Press | Finalist | |
| 2024 | Macanudo: Optimism is for the Brave | Liniers | Fantagraphics | Finalist | |
| 2024 | The Yakuza's Bias | Teki Yatsuda, trans. by Max Greenway | Kodansha | Finalist | |
| 2025 | Processing: 100 Comics That Got Me Through It | Tara Booth | Drawn & Quarterly | Winner | |
| 2025 | Adulthood is a Gift! | Sarah Andersen | Andrews McMeel | Finalist | |
| 2025 | Forces of Nature | Edward Steed | Drawn & Quarterly | Finalist | |
| 2025 | Kids Are Still Weird: And More Observations from Parenthood | Jeffrey Brown | NBM | Finalist | |
| 2025 | A Pillbug Story | Allison Conway | Black Panel Press | Finalist | |
| 2026 | Physics for Cats | Tom Gauld | Drawn & Quarterly | Winner | |
| 2026 | And To Think We Started as a Book Club | Tom Toro | Andrews McMeel | Finalist | |
| 2026 | Ew, It's Beautiful: A False Knees Comics Collection | Joshua Barkman | Andrews McMeel | Finalist | |
| 2026 | The Great British Bump-Off: Kill or Be Quilt | John Allison and Max Sarin | Dark Horse | Finalist | |
| 2026 | Jeff the Land Shark | Kelly Thompson and Tokitokoro | Marvel | Finalist | |
| 2026 | Spent: A Comic Novel | Alison Bechdel | Mariner Books | Finalist | |
