= Shannon Watters =

American comics writer and editor

- Occupations: Comics writer, former editor
- Writing career
- Notable works: Lumberjanes, Hollow
- Website: https://www.shannonwatters.com/

Shannon Watters is an American comics writer and editor. She is known for co-creating and writing for the comics series Lumberjanes, as well as the graphic novel Hollow. She is also a former senior editor for Boom! Studios and the founder of its imprint Boom! Box.

== Career ==
In 2013, Watters launched Boom! Box, an imprint of Boom! Studios. She originally joined Boom! Studios in 2009 as an editorial assistant. In 2018, she was promoted to senior editor of Boom! Studios. She left her position in 2021.

Alongside ND Stevenson, Gus Allen, and Grace Ellis, Watters co-created Lumberjanes, a comic series about five girls at a summer camp who go on adventures where they encounter various supernatural creatures. The series was published by Boom! Box and ran from 2014 to 2020, with Watters writing for the series throughout its run. It received various accolades across its six-year publication, including winning the Eisner Awards for Best Publication for Teens and Best New Series in 2015 and the GLAAD Media Award for Outstanding Comic Book in 2016.

In 2022, she published the graphic novel Hollow, which was co-written by Branden Boyer-White and illustrated by Berenice Nelle. Inspired by The Legend of Sleepy Hollow, the book follows three teens, new girl Izzy Crane, Vicky Van Tassel, and Croc Byun, who live in the modern-day town of Sleepy Hollow and find themselves facing off with the Headless Horseman, who plots to kill Vicky.

== Publications ==
=== Hollow ===
- Watters, Shannon; Boyer-White, Branden (October 4, 2022). Hollow. Illustrated by Berenice Nelle. Boom! Box. ISBN 978-1684158522.
- Watters, Shannon; Boyer-White, Branden (August 5, 2025). Hollow: The Woman in White. Illustrated by Berenice Nelle. Boom! Box. ISBN 978-1684151233.

=== Lumberjanes ===
- ND, Stevenson; Watters, Shannon; Ellis, Grace; Allen, Gus; Laiho, Maarta; Aiese, Aubrey (April 7, 2015). Lumberjanes Vol. 1: Beware The Kitten Holy. Boom! Studios. ISBN 978-1608866878.
- ND, Stevenson; Watters, Shannon; Ellis, Grace; Allen, Gus (October 13, 2015). Lumberjanes Vol. 2: Friendship To The Max. Boom! Studios. ISBN 978-1608867370.
- ND, Stevenson; Watters, Shannon; Ellis, Grace; Allen, Gus (April 5, 2016). Lumberjanes Vol. 3: A Terrible Plan. Boom! Studios. ISBN 978-1608868032.
- ND, Stevenson; Watters, Shannon; Ellis, Grace; Allen, Gus (July 12, 2016). Lumberjanes Vol. 4: Out Of Time. Boom! Studios. ISBN 978-1608868605.
- ND, Stevenson; Watters, Shannon; Ellis, Grace; Allen, Gus (December 13, 2016). Lumberjanes Vol. 5: Band Together. Boom! Studios. ISBN 978-1608869190.
- Stevenson, ND; Watters, Shannon; Ellis, Grace; Allen, Gus; Leyh, Kat; Pietsch, Carey; Laiho, Maarta; Sotuyo (April 11, 2017). Lumberjanes Vol. 6: Sink or Swim. Boom! Studios. ISBN 978-1608869541.
- ND, Stevenson; Watters, Shannon; Ellis, Grace; Allen, Gus; Leyh, Kat; Pietsch, Carey; Laiho, Maarta; Sotuyo, Ayme (December 12, 2017). Lumberjanes Vol. 7: A Bird's-Eye View. Boom! Studios. ISBN 978-1684150458.
- ND, Stevenson; Watters, Shannon; Ellis, Grace; Allen, Gus; Leyh, Kat; Pietsch, Carey; Laiho, Maarta (February 20, 2018). Lumberjanes, Vol. 8: Stone Cold. Boom! Studios. ISBN 978-1684151325.
- Leyh, Kat; Nowak, Carolyn; Watters, Shannon; Stevenson, ND; Ellis, Grace; Allen, Gus; Laiho, Maarta (July 24, 2018). Lumberjanes, Vol. 9: On a Roll. Boom! Studios. ISBN 978-1608869572.
- Leyh, Kat; Watters, Shannon; Stevenson, ND; Ellis, Grace; Allen, Gus; Sotuyo, Ayme; Laiho, Maarta (December 11, 2018). Lumberjanes Vol. 10: Parents' Day. Boom! Studios. ISBN 978-1684152780.
- Leyh, Kat; Watters, Shannon; Stevenson, ND; Ellis, Grace; Allen, Gus; Sotuyo, Ayme; Laiho, Maarta (April 2, 2019). Lumberjanes, Vol. 11: Time After Crime. Boom! Studios. ISBN 978-1684153251.
- ND, Stevenson; Watters, Shannon; Ellis, Grace; Allen, Gus (July 30, 2019). Lumberjanes, Vol. 12: Jackalope Springs Eternal. Boom! Studios. ISBN 978-1684153800.
- Leyh, Kat; Laiho, Maarta; Watters, Shannon; Stevenson, ND; Ellis, Grace; Allen, Gus; Dozerdraws (December 24, 2019). Lumberjanes, Vol. 13: Indoor Recess. Boom! Studios. ISBN 978-1684154500.
- Leyh, Kat; Laiho, Maarta; Watters, Shannon; Aiese, Aubrey; Dozerdraws (May 26, 2020). Lumberjanes, Vol. 14: X Marks the Spot. Boom! Studios. ISBN 978-1684155507.
- Watters, Shannon; Leyh, Kat; Rogers, AnneMarie (August 18, 2020). Lumberjanes, Vol. 15: Birthday Smarty. Boom! Studios. ISBN 978-1684155514.
- Watters, Shannon; Leyh, Kat; Rogers, AnneMarie (December 22, 2020). Lumberjanes, Vol. 16: Mind over Mettle. Boom! Studios. ISBN 978-1684156672.
- Watters, Shannon; Leyh, Kat; Bryant, Kanesha C (February 9, 2021). Lumberjanes, Vol. 17: Smitten in the Stars. Boom! Studios. ISBN 978-1684156672.
- Watters, Shannon; Leyh, Kat; Bryant, Kanesha C; Madrigal, Julie (May 25, 2021). Lumberjanes, Vol. 18: Horticultural Horizons. Boom! Studios. ISBN 978-1684156986.
- Watters, Shannon; Leyh, Kat (August 24, 2021). Lumberjanes, Vol. 19: A Summer to Remember. Boom! Studios. ISBN 978-1684156993.
- Watters, Shannon; Leyh, Kat; Allen, Gus; Bosy, Alexa; Bryant, Kanesha C (November 9, 2021). Lumberjanes, Vol. 20: End of Summer. Boom! Studios. ISBN 978-1684157433.
