= Gus Allen =

American comics artist

- Notable work: Lumberjanes

Gus Allen (previously credited as Brooke A. Allen or Brooklyn Allen) is an American comics artist. He is primarily known for his work as a co-creator and artist for the comic series Lumberjanes.

== Career ==
=== Lumberjanes ===
Allen is a co-creator of the Boom! Studios comic series Lumberjanes alongside ND Stevenson, Shannon Watters, and Grace Ellis. The series, which launched in 2014, follows five girls who go on supernatural adventures while attending a summer camp. Allen created the initial character designs for the series, and provided art for the series when it started. After leaving the series, he returned in 2020 for the series finale in the one-shot issue Lumberjanes: End of Summer #1. In addition to the main comic, he illustrated four tie-in novels which were written by Mariko Tamaki, as well as The Lumberjanes BEASTiary, a guidebook about the creatures depicted in the series also by Tamaki.

=== Other works ===
In 2011, Allen published A Home for Mr. Easter, a graphic novel about a teenage girl who encounters an egg-laying rabbit she believes is the Easter Bunny and must protect him from various people who wish to harm him.

In 2016, he illustrated Welcome to Wonderland: Home Sweet Motel by Chris Grabenstein. He also drew the artwork for its 2017 sequel, Welcome to Wonderland: Beach Party Surf Monkey.

== Publications ==
- A Home for Mr. Easter. NBM Publishing. June 2010. ISBN 978-1561635801.
- Grabenstein, Chris (October 4, 2016). Welcome to Wonderland: Home Sweet Motel. Random House. ISBN 978-0553536027.
- Grabenstein, Chris (May 23, 2017). Welcome to Wonderland: Beach Party Surf Monkey. Random House. ISBN 978-0553536102.

=== Lumberjanes comics ===
- ND, Stevenson; Watters, Shannon; Ellis, Grace; Allen, Gus; Laiho, Maarta; Aiese, Aubrey (April 7, 2015). Lumberjanes Vol. 1: Beware The Kitten Holy. Boom! Studios. ISBN 978-1608866878.
- ND, Stevenson; Watters, Shannon; Ellis, Grace; Allen, Gus (October 13, 2015). Lumberjanes Vol. 2: Friendship To The Max. Boom! Studios. ISBN 978-1608867370.
- ND, Stevenson; Watters, Shannon; Ellis, Grace; Allen, Gus (April 5, 2016). Lumberjanes Vol. 3: A Terrible Plan. Boom! Studios. ISBN 978-1608868032.
- ND, Stevenson; Watters, Shannon; Ellis, Grace; Allen, Gus (July 12, 2016). Lumberjanes Vol. 4: Out Of Time. Boom! Studios. ISBN 978-1608868605.
- ND, Stevenson; Watters, Shannon; Ellis, Grace; Allen, Gus (December 13, 2016). Lumberjanes Vol. 5: Band Together. Boom! Studios. ISBN 978-1608869190.
- Stevenson, ND; Watters, Shannon; Ellis, Grace; Allen, Gus; Leyh, Kat; Pietsch, Carey; Laiho, Maarta; Sotuyo (April 11, 2017). Lumberjanes Vol. 6: Sink or Swim. Boom! Studios. ISBN 978-1608869541.
- ND, Stevenson; Watters, Shannon; Ellis, Grace; Allen, Gus; Leyh, Kat; Pietsch, Carey; Laiho, Maarta; Sotuyo, Ayme (December 12, 2017). Lumberjanes Vol. 7: A Bird's-Eye View. Boom! Studios. ISBN 978-1684150458.
- ND, Stevenson; Watters, Shannon; Ellis, Grace; Allen, Gus; Leyh, Kat; Pietsch, Carey; Laiho, Maarta (February 20, 2018). Lumberjanes, Vol. 8: Stone Cold. Boom! Studios. ISBN 978-1684151325.
- Leyh, Kat; Nowak, Carolyn; Watters, Shannon; Stevenson, ND; Ellis, Grace; Allen, Gus; Laiho, Maarta (July 24, 2018). Lumberjanes, Vol. 9: On a Roll. Boom! Studios. ISBN 978-1608869572.
- Leyh, Kat; Watters, Shannon; Stevenson, ND; Ellis, Grace; Allen, Gus; Sotuyo, Ayme; Laiho, Maarta (December 11, 2018). Lumberjanes Vol. 10: Parents' Day. Boom! Studios. ISBN 978-1684152780.
- Leyh, Kat; Watters, Shannon; Stevenson, ND; Ellis, Grace; Allen, Gus; Sotuyo, Ayme; Laiho, Maarta (April 2, 2019). Lumberjanes, Vol. 11: Time After Crime. Boom! Studios. ISBN 978-1684153251.
- ND, Stevenson; Watters, Shannon; Ellis, Grace; Allen, Gus (July 30, 2019). Lumberjanes, Vol. 12: Jackalope Springs Eternal. Boom! Studios. ISBN 978-1684153800.
- Leyh, Kat; Laiho, Maarta; Watters, Shannon; Stevenson, ND; Ellis, Grace; Allen, Gus; Dozerdraws (December 24, 2019). Lumberjanes, Vol. 13: Indoor Recess. Boom! Studios. ISBN 978-1684154500.
- Watters, Shannon; Leyh, Kat; Allen, Gus; Bosy, Alexa; Bryant, Kanesha C (November 9, 2021). Lumberjanes, Vol. 20: End of Summer. Boom! Studios. ISBN 978-1684157433.

=== Lumberjanes novels ===
- Tamaki, Mariko (October 10, 2017). Unicorn Power!. Illustrated by Gus Allen. Amulet Books. ISBN 978-1419727252.
- Tamaki, Mariko (May 8, 2018). The Moon Is Up. Illustrated by Gus Allen. Amulet Books. ISBN 978-1419728686.
- Tamaki, Mariko (October 30, 2018). The Good Egg. Illustrated by Gus Allen. Amulet Books. ISBN 978-1419731310.
- Tamaki, Mariko (September 10, 2019). Ghost Cabin. Illustrated by Gus Allen. Amulet Books. ISBN 978-1419733611.
- Tamaki, Mariko (July 7, 2020). The Lumberjanes BEASTiary. Amulet Books. ISBN 978-1419736445.
