= Carey Pietsch =

American cartoonist, illustrator and artist

Caroline Elizabeth Pietsch (born November 11, 1988), known professionally as Carey Pietsch, is an American cartoonist, illustrator and artist. She is best known for her work on several webcomics and on The Adventure Zone series of graphic novels.

== Early life and career ==
Pietsch grew up in Ossining, New York, and graduated from Swarthmore College in 2010. She worked on several webcomics like the Mages of Mystralia Webcomic, Lumberjanes Issues 29–32, Adventure Time: Marceline Gone Adrift, as well as original, self published work.

== The Adventure Zone graphic novels ==
In 2015, Pietsch started drawing fan art of the popular Dungeons & Dragons podcast The Adventure Zone by Justin, Travis and Griffin McElroy and their father Clint McElroy. When the idea came up of turning the successful story into a graphic novel, the McElroy family approached Pietsch for the artwork. She had previously collaborated with them to design a poster for their live shows of The Adventure Zone as well as My Brother, My Brother and Me. Clint McElroy said, "We were spending so much time sending each other links to her stuff we figured it would be easier to just collaborate with her. We realized she 'gets it'..."

The first part of the graphic novel series, The Adventure Zone: Here There Be Gerblins, written by the McElroys and illustrated by Pietsch, was released in July 2018 and published by First Second Books. It quickly topped the New York Times' Paperback Trade Fiction Best-Sellers list, and came third overall in the Combined Print and E-Book Fiction list, the highest placement for a graphic novel on the fiction list as of August 2019.

The second part, The Adventure Zone: Murder on the Rockport Limited! was released in July 2019. It also reached the number 1 spot on the New York Times' Paperback Trade Fiction Best-Seller list, and number 4 on the Combined Print & E-Book Fiction list.

The third part, The Adventure Zone: Petals to the Metal, was released in July 2020. It reached number 1 on the New York Times Bestseller list.

The fourth installment, The Adventure Zone: Crystal Kingdom, was released July 13, 2021. Pietsch was involved in a New York Comic Con panel in September 2020 to discuss Crystal Kingdom along with adapting The Adventure Zone into a graphic novel series.

The fifth graphic novel, The Adventure Zone: The Eleventh Hour, was released in February 2023, followed by The Adventure Zone: The Suffering Game in July 2024.

== Bibliography ==
- Oath Anthology of New (Queer) Heroes (contributor, 2016)
- Adventure Time: Marceline Gone Adrift (with Meredith Gran, 2015)
- Lumberjanes Vol. 6: Sink or Swim (with ND Stevenson, Shannon Watters, Grace Ellis, Gus Allen, Kat Leyh, Maarta Laiho, 2017)
- Lumberjanes Vol. 7: A Bird's-Eye View (ND Stevenson, Shannon Watters, Grace Ellis, Gus Allen, Kat Leyh, Maarta Laiho, Ayme Sotuyo, 2017)
- Lumberjanes Vol. 8: Stone Cold (with ND Stevenson, Shannon Watters, Grace Ellis, Gus Allen, Kat Leyh, Maarta Laiho, 2017)
- Mages of Mystralia (with Brian Clevinger, 2018)
- The Adventure Zone: Here There Be Gerblins (with Clint McElroy, Justin McElroy, Travis McElroy, Griffin McElroy, 2018)
- The Adventure Zone: Murder on the Rockport Limited! (With Clint McElroy, Justin McElroy, Travis McElroy, Griffin McElroy, 2019)
- The Adventure Zone: Petals to the Metal (With Clint McElroy, Justin McElroy, Travis McElroy, Griffin McElroy, 2020)
- The Adventure Zone: The Crystal Kingdom (With Clint McElroy, Justin McElroy, Travis McElroy, Griffin McElroy, 2021)
- The Adventure Zone: The Eleventh Hour (With Clint McElroy, Justin McElroy, Travis McElroy, Griffin McElroy, 2023)
