= Snapdragon (graphic novel) =

2020 graphic novel by Kat Leyh

- Author: Kat Leyh
- Language: English
- Genre: Graphic novel; Fantasy
- Publisher: First Second Books
- Publication date: February 4, 2020
- Publication place: United States
- Pages: 240
- ISBN: 978-1-250-17112-2

Snapdragon is a graphic novel written and illustrated by Kat Leyh, which was published in 2020 by First Second Books. It tells the story of a teenage girl called Snapdragon, who becomes friends with the neighborhood witch, and focuses on her life and relationships.

== Plot ==
Snapdragon, nicknamed Snap, lives in a town where a witch who eats roadkill is rumored to live in. She meets the "witch", only to discover she is an old woman named Jacks who harvests roadkill to create statues out of their skeletons to be sold. Nevertheless, Snap takes an interest in Jacks' work and asks to be mentored. Snap finds an old picture of Jacks with her grandmother Jessamine; the woman explains that she and Jessamine were in love with each other but ultimately broke up. While releasing a group of baby possums into the woods, Snap is surprised that she and Jacks are able to see the ghost of the possum's mother around them. Jacks explains that she is in fact a witch, and Snap asks her to teach how to perform magic.

Jacks instructs Snap on how to focus on her energy in order to interact with ghosts, but she is disappointed in her failures. She instead practices magic herself in a more haphazard way. She shows her technique to Jacks, but when it almost gets someone hurt, Jacks tells her to stick to her method of controlling one's energy.

The abusive ex-boyfriend of Snap's mother returns to her home one day while Snap is home alone. Jacks is alerted by her magic and quickly brings her mother home while Snap fends him off with her own magic. Snap and her mother invite Jacks to Thanksgiving, where Jacks reunites with Jessamine and they fall back in love. As Snap becomes more confident in her powers, she reflects that the rumor of a witch living in their town is almost true; there's just more than one.

== Development ==
The book was originally intended to be titled Roadkill Witch.

== Reception ==
Kirkus Reviews gave Snapdragon a starred review saying "Leyh expertly blends fantasy and realism in her energetic debut solo middle-grade graphic novel." They considered the cast of the novel to be well written, and praised its diversity, which includes a trans woman and characters "coded as black—all, refreshingly, presenting with a realistic variety of skin tones and hair colors and textures." Matisse Mozer, who wrote for the School Library Journal, also gave the novel a starred review, noting the author "draws from her experience working on the 'Lumberjanes' series to craft a work that centers inclusion and acceptance." Commenting on the art style, Mozer says the choice for an "anime-esque panel structure and imagery" helped create a lighter atmosphere for the story, despite the complex themes Snapdragon deals with.

A starred review published by Publishers Weekly praised the "variety of ethnicities, sexualities, and gender expressions" and concluded it by saying "this intersectional, layered tale offers joyful and affirming depictions of social outsiders and comfortably complicated families." Télérama's review of the book compared its setting to The Goonies movie and the Stranger Things show, but noted Snapdragon differs from those media in its tone, as fantasy is not its main focus, and for happening in a more modest neighborhood. They also compared its art style and themes to that of The Witch Boy by Lee Knox Ostertag, and ended by saying Leyh was able to create a "sensitive and benevolent story" about choices and second chances.

== Accolades ==
Year	Awards	Result	Reference
2020	Cybils Award for Graphic Novel	Shortlisted	
2021	Eisner Award for Best Publication for Kids	Shortlisted	
2021	Mythopoeic Fantasy Award for Children's Literature	Shortlisted	
2021	American Library Association Rainbow Book List - Young Readers	Top Ten	
2021	Great Graphic Novels for Teens	Top Ten	
2021	Quick Picks for Reluctant Young Adult Readers	Top Ten	

== Animated adaption ==
In 2024, it was announced that Gaumont Animation was planning to create an animated project based on the book.

== See also ==
- Thirsty Mermaids - another graphic novel by Leyh
- Lumberjanes
- Check, Please!
- The Deep and Dark Blue
