= Thirsty Mermaids =

2021 graphic novel by Kat Leyh

- Date: February 9, 2021
- Publisher: Gallery 13/Simon & Schuster

Creative team
- Creator: Kat Leyh
- ISBN: 9781982133573

Thirsty Mermaids is a comedy fantasy graphic novel by Kat Leyh. It was published on February 9, 2021 by Gallery 13.

== Plot ==
Stripe-tailed Pearl, horned Tooth, and eel-like sea witch Eez are mermaids and friends who drink wine they find on a shipwreck. Once their supply runs out, Eez uses her magic to transform the trio to humans to go on land to continue their drinking binge. However, when they wake up hungover the following day, they realize they have no idea how to change back into mermaids. Taken in by bartender Vivi, Pearl and Tooth take up jobs while Eez attempts to reverse their transformation.

== Reception ==
Publishers Weekly gave the book a starred review, discussing the book's themes of themes of "social alienation and queer “found family”", with Vivi being a trans woman of color. They gave particular praise to the art, saying "each page vibrates with glowing colors, lending energy to Leyh’s already raucous (and bodily diverse) character designs."

Kirkus Reviews noted the diversity among the cast, with characters being varied in terms of race, LGBTQ+ identity, body type, and appearance in mermaid form, and concluded that the book was a "bright, bold shot of fun with a chaser of feels."

The Hub, a blog for the Young Adult Library Services Association, commented that although the book was mainly appealing due to its cast and comedic moments, it also covered heavier topic such as chosen family and body dysmorphia. The reviewer compared the book to Rat Queens.

Thirsty Mermaids was a finalist both the 2022 Eisner Award for Best Humor Publication and the 2022 Lambda Literary Award for LGBTQ+ Comics.

== See also ==
- Snapdragon - another graphic novel by Leyh
- Lumberjanes
