= Lenoir =

Lenoir may refer to:

== Locations ==
- Lenoir, North Carolina, United States
- Lenoir County, North Carolina, United States
- Lenoir City, Tennessee

== Universities ==
- Lenoir-Rhyne University
- Lenoir Dining Hall, a dining hall at the University of North Carolina at Chapel Hill

== Other ==
- USS Lenoir (AKA-74), a World War II attack cargo ship
- Lenoir cycle, the basis of the first commercially produced internal combustion engine

== Names ==
- Lenoir (surname)

== See also ==
- Richard-Lenoir (Paris Metro)
