= Edward Steed =

British cartoonist and illustrator

Edward Steed (born 1987) is a British cartoonist and illustrator, best known for his work for The New Yorker.

== Early life ==
Steed was born in 1987 in Suffolk, England, where he grew up in the countryside. He describes his East Anglian upbringing as a major influence on his humor. While he enjoyed drawing as a young child, he had stopped by the time he was in high school. He studied to become an architect and worked in the field in London and Beijing for a few years, but he never obtained his full qualification.

== Cartooning career ==
Steed began drawing again in 2012, when he decided to change careers and became interested in becoming a New Yorker cartoonist, having seen examples of New Yorker cartoons online. His first cartoon was published in the magazine in March the following year. He subsequently moved to New York—where he continues to live—only reading a print issue of The New Yorker for the first time on the plane to America. Since then, he has been a regular contributor of cartoons and cover illustrations for the magazine. In 2015, he was featured in the documentary Very Semi-Serious, about cartooning at The New Yorker.

His work has been noted for its "signature scratchy line mark" and its "succinct, oblique humor" and "dark hilarity." He cites Charles Barsotti, John Glashan, William Steig, Saul Steinberg, and André François among his influences.

A collection of his cartoons was published by Drawn & Quarterly in 2024, under the title Forces of Nature. The collection was nominated for an Eisner Award for Best Humor Publication the following year. It was followed by the collection Happy Hour in 2026.

Steed has also produced illustrations for other magazines and projects, including the album cover for Father John Misty's Pure Comedy in 2017, for which he won the Grammy Award for Best Recording Package. The cover was also ranked second in the 2017 Best Art Vinyl awards.
