= Cheshire Crossing =

Webcomic by Andy Weir

- Cheshire Crossing. Cover art by Sarah Andersen.

Publication information
- Publisher: Ten Speed Press (2019); Random House (audio play); Tapas (syndicate)
- Schedule: Bimonthly (2006–2008); Biweekly (2017–2019)
- Genre: Fantasy
- Publication date: June 2006 – August 2019
- No. of issues: 4
- Main characters: Alice Liddell; Dorothy Gale; Wendy Darling

Creative team
- Written by: Andy Weir
- Artist(s): Andy Weir (2006–2008); Sarah Andersen (2017–2019)
- Letterer: Dave Lanphear (2017–2019)
- Colorists: Alison Georg (2017–2019); Kayla Bickers (2017–2019); Dojo Gubser (2017–2019)

Collected editions
- Cheshire Crossing: ISBN 978-0-876179-15-4

Cheshire Crossing is a fantasy webcomic written and originally illustrated by Andy Weir from 2006 to 2008, and later re-illustrated by Sarah Andersen for Tapas from 2017 to 2019. The latter version was published as a graphic novel by Ten Speed Press, an imprint of Random House, in 2019. The story, taking place in the early 1900s, takes characters from Alice's Adventures in Wonderland, The Wizard of Oz, and Peter Pan, and follows Alice Liddell, Dorothy Gale, and Wendy Darling after they are united at "Cheshire Crossing" by the mysterious Dr. Ernest Rutherford and Miss Mary Poppins (renamed Miss Poole in some versions) (Note: While called Miss Mary Poppins in the original, the nanny character goes mostly unnamed in the Tapas version, though is called "Poppins" at least once. She is named "Miss Poole" in the print version (with a background document establishing her first name as "Gwendolyn") and in the audio play version, due to the rights to use the Mary Poppins character not being owned by Random House. The other characters are public domain.) to study their abilities to travel between worlds before facing the combined forces of the reconstituted Wicked Witch of the West and Captain Hook.

The graphic novel was adapted into an audio drama, and has also been optioned for a film adaptation.

== Plot ==
Cover of Issue 1, drawn by Weir in 2006. Weir described his own art as "utter crap" and said "art is... an annoying and necessary evil".

=== Overview ===
Wendy Darling, Dorothy Gale, and Alice Liddell are all teenagers who have been diagnosed with "dissociative psychosis" following their respective travels to other worlds. The three have been committed to various wards and sanitariums, including Dorothy receiving electroshock therapy. By 1910, the characters are teenagers and are no longer sweet or naive as in the original works. The three are all sent by their parents to Cheshire Crossing, an English boarding school and research facility where they are the only patients. Dr Rutherford, who leads the institution, genuinely believes the girls can travel between worlds and wants to help them with their powers, and has appointed a nanny to care for them who carries an umbrella and has some powers of her own. Alice uses Dorothy's slippers to travel to Oz; Wendy is taken along with her while trying to stop her.

Their adventures continue between Earth, Neverland, Wonderland, and Oz, dealing with the Wicked Witch of the West and Captain Hook, who team up both for villainy and love. Many other characters from the original works appear, including the Cheshire Cat, the Knave of Hearts, The Mad Hatter, Tinkerbell, Munchkins, flying monkeys, and Peter Pan, who ages up during the story and obsesses over Alice.

=== Detailed synopsis ===
There are some small changes between the various versions of the story. Most notably, the name of the nanny was changed from Mary Poppins to Ms. Gwendolyn Poole. The plot summary below describes the original version, with any changes marked with footnotes.

==== Issue 1 ====
In 1904, Alice Liddell's parents discover her unconscious on the grounds of their estate, after she was missing for six days. After having her see a doctor, they ponder aloud where she was for that time and what happened to her, as Alice sits silently in her bed.

Six years later, Alice is brought to the apparent mental institution "Cheshire Crossing" by Mary Poppins, where she meets Wendy Darling and is told to await a third girl. Alice finds the windows are locked while Wendy practices throwing knives. Both briefly discuss their diagnoses of "dissociative psychosis" (described in the comic as meaning "crazy by means of creating an imaginary world"), talking of "Neverland" and "Wonderland" and their histories in similar institutions, both seeing the other as mad. After the arrival of the third girl, the American Dorothy Gale, Poppins brings them before Dr. Ernest Rutherford, who reveals Cheshire Crossing is a research facility and that he knows all three girls are sane and capable of travelling to other worlds. He informs them that experiments will begin the following day, to Alice's dismay, who expresses her not wanting to be a lab rat. They are then sent to shared sleeping quarters by Poppins, who Rutherford says will be their nanny and tutor.

That night, Dorothy asks Alice and Wendy about Wonderland and Neverland, revealing she first travelled to Oz in a tornado, but now can go any time using a pair of ruby slippers (Note: In versions illustrated by Andersen, the slippers are silver-colored, but in the Tapas version at least they are both described as "silver shoes" and as "ruby slippers".) and calling out "There's no place like Oz". After prompting, Alice reveals she can travel to Wonderland via any reflective surface, most commonly mirrors, while Wendy states Neverland is located at "the second star to the right". After Alice attempts to escape, thwarted by Poppins, Alice takes Dorothy's slippers while she is asleep and uses them to flee to Oz, inadvertently taking Wendy with her.

After waking in Oz, Alice's arrival is detected by the Wicked Witch of the West with her crystal ball. West is surprised to see the slippers on someone other than Dorothy and sends a squad of flying monkeys to retrieve them. Both West and Alice are shocked when, after the flying monkeys lift her up into the air, Wendy flies into the air and rescues Alice. Wendy and Alice land in the poppy field which puts Wendy to sleep, but Alice resists due to a high laudanum tolerance. Alice flees to Wonderland through a nearby pond, where she is greeted by the Cheshire Cat.

==== Issue 2 ====
In a flashback, Dorothy is informed by Glinda the Good in Oz how to use the slippers to return to her home in Kansas, before she realizes Glinda could have told her earlier and had manipulated her into killing the Wicked Witch of the West for her. In the present, at Cheshire Crossing, Dorothy tells Poppins and Rutherford of Alice's actions. Rutherford says that Dorothy's "powers are inherent" and tells her to go to Oz. After saying "There's no place like Oz", Dorothy is transported to Oz with Poppins, who explains to her that rather than the slippers providing her the power to travel to Oz, she herself had provided the power to the shoes, having subconsciously brought herself and her house to Oz previously during the previous tornado. Dorothy and Poppins follow the Yellow Brick Road to the Munchkin Village, where Dorothy is surprised to learn from its mayor that the Wicked Witch of the West is alive again, having returned a few months prior, and has captured "a girl from afar". Dorothy is berated for "sheer carelessness" by Poppins upon revealing she had previously accidentally killed both the Wicked Witch of the West and her sister.

In Wonderland, Alice is greeted by Jack the Knave of Hearts and his playing card soldiers, who hail her as a hero for having previously stood up to the Queen of Hearts. Grateful for her having previously saved him at his trial, Jack introduces her to the rebel troupe she inspired (including the Hatter). Alice offers to bring Jack and his troupe to Oz in exchange for helping to find and save Wendy. In West's castle, a shackled Wendy attempts to escape before being knocked unconscious by West. West examines Wendy and finds she is a "conduit to another world". After consulting dark spirits about this world, West learns its name, Neverland, and that it has fairies. Now viewing the slippers as unimportant, West has Wendy brought to her casting chamber, and uses her to create a gate to Neverland.

Outside the castle, in the mountains of Oz, Dorothy and Poppins encounter Alice and Jack's troupe after being led to them by Glinda after Alice had re-entered Oz with Jack's troupe. After returning Dorothy's slippers, Alice uses a shrinking potion she acquired from Wonderland to sneak past the Winkies, (Note: Named "Winks" in the Sarah Andersen-illustrated Tapas and Random House version.) West's personal guards, then grows again with a magic cake and opens the castle's door from the inside. After overcoming the guards, the troupe reaches the Witch's casting room as she opens a portal to Neverland. Upon seeing Dorothy, West attempts to disintegrate her, but Poppins protects her with her umbrella. As Poppins battles West, the Cheshire Cat frees Wendy and she saves Alice and Dorothy from King Nikko of the flying monkeys. Recognizing Poppins as a fellow witch, and citing the "strange rules" of Oz, West splashes Poppins with a bucket of water, melting her. Enraged, Dorothy punches West through the portal to Neverland, closing it behind her. Dorothy believes Poppins can be restored, given that West had returned from Dorothy previously melting her, and Alice gathers Poppins' remains into a bucket to return her to Rutherford. Meanwhile, in Neverland, West wakes on the pirate ship of Captain James Hook, and explains to him that she had designed the portal to bring her to "the most evil being in Neverland".

==== Issue 3 ====
One month later, on his ship, Captain Hook and his crew have raided half the fairy villages of Neverland, and presents the fairies to the Wicked Witch of the West as Smee sends word of Peter's and "Tink" Tinker Bell's arrival to rescue them. West hits Peter with lightning, (Note: Instead of lightning, these scenes show a general magical wave in the Sarah Andersen-illustrated Tapas and Random House version.) rendering him unconscious, while Tink flees, all according to Hook's plan.

At Cheshire Crossing, Rutherford and his assistant Lem examine Poppins' remains to find that she is slowly reforming to her original configuration, but it would take her years to completely reform if left on her own. Meanwhile, while doing her hair, Dorothy finds she can now pass through mirrors like Alice. She tells Alice this who warns Dorothy not to do it again. Tink then crashes through the window and relays the circumstances of Peter's and the fairies' kidnapping to Wendy. After informing Alice and Dorothy of the situation, they agree to join her in rescuing them, and Tink provides the pair with fairy dust to allow them to fly like Wendy, powered by "happy thoughts". To fly, Dorothy thinks of her aunt, while Alice thinks of a man named Richard, which she is teased for. While flying to Neverland, Dorothy draws up a plan to rescue Peter, deciding that she will confront the Witch while Wendy distracts the pirates and Alice shrinks herself to rescue the fairies.

Upon arriving in Neverland and approaching Hook's ship, the trio put their plan into motion. While Hook and West are becoming romantically involved as he teaches her to how to pilot his ship, Wendy flies in above to distract them, while Dorothy throws a bucket of water at West from behind her, but it has no effect – witches are only weak to water in Oz. After Dorothy dodges West's lightning, West uses a spell to disable flight in the area, grounding both girls and Tink. After embarking in a duel with Hook, Wendy is stabbed in the gut and falls overboard. Elsewhere, a cornered Dorothy also throws the slippers overboard to keep them from West and tricks her into burning her own face, before being taken prisoner by Hook. Meanwhile Alice, having snuck into Hook's quarters, is unable to open the orb in which the fairies are imprisoned and hides in Wonderland through Hook's mirror before he and West enter. After they leave the room again, Alice returns and drags the unconscious Peter through the mirror into Wonderland. After waking Peter and explaining the situation, Alice decides they will require stronger magic to defeat West and ventures into the Tumtum Forest with Peter to retrieve the Vorpal Sword, while avoiding the Jabberwock.

Wendy is rescued by a mermaid, who delivers her and the slippers to the Neverland tribe of Tiger Lily, who knows Wendy as "Pan-Mother". After waking, Wendy is surprised that Tiger Lily has healed her, despite her wound having been a fatal one. After attempting to leave, Wendy feels woozy. Tiger Lily tells her that she needs a day of sleep to fully recover, and Wendy falls asleep again. The next day, Alice wakes in Wonderland to find Peter, having been eating the size-altering berries of Tumtum Forest, to have physically grown up. Peter now finds Alice pretty, and her chest "interesting", although he has no idea why. As Peter continues discussing his "weird feelings" with Alice, he remarks that he sees Wendy as his mother, as she had agreed to raise him and his friends.

Meanwhile, on Hook's ship, West punches Dorothy for having killed her sister, declaring that she will kill her over the course of several days. Hook, however, advises West not to do so given "beating prisoners is bad form", and so that she can serve as "alive and kicking" bait for a trap for Wendy and Alice. Hook and West announce that they will be invading the shores of Neverland once again to capture more fairies; subsequently, Dorothy calls out "There's no place like Oz.", taking not just her but all off Hook's ship to Oz. Hook's ship aground in the fields and Dorothy is knocked unconscious. While unconscious, Hook and West delight in Dorothy having fallen for their plan to get the ship to Oz, and West uses the power of the captured fairies to make the ship fly. Hook orders Smee to sail it to West's castle to reclaim it for her. Recognizing Hook as "evil and honorable", she hugs him, welcoming him to Oz. In Cheshire Crossing, Rutherford instantly causes Poppins' reconstitution using a teaspoon of table sugar as a catalyst.

==== Issue 4 ====
In a flashback, Dorothy has saved Emerald City for the seventh time. To repay her, King Scarecrow and Tik-Tok (the two smartest people in Oz) agree to teach Dorothy to be smart and "view every problem from every angle". In the present, as West insists Hook not use his cannons against her castle in reclaiming it, Tink sneaks on board and unties Dorothy. Dorothy decides to remain and pretend to still be bound and gagged while Tink warns the castle of West's return with Hook. After preventing the Cheshire Cat from eating her, Tink warns Jack, who prepares his troops for battle. Elsewhere, Wendy, having returned to Oz after recovering and being informed of the situation by mermaids that had been surrounding Hook's ship, encounters a Munchkin by the hole where the ship landed, who expresses his intent to turn it into a farm on behalf of his new ruler, "Prince Jack", and directs Wendy in the direction as the ship, towards Castle West, who flies after it.

As Hook and West invade the castle, Dorothy sneaks away to. As Hook duels Jack, he stabs him in the chest and is surprised by him not dying; Jack explains that as he is a living playing card, poking holes in him won't kill him, disappointing Hook. Meanwhile, in Wonderland, Peter and Alice face the Red Bishop, keeper of the Vorpal Sword, who offers to give it to them if they can solve his riddle. While Alice attempts to solve the riddle, Peter instead punches the bishop and flees with the sword(punch was the correct answer to the riddle). As the pair subsequently fly towards the portal which Alice left open to Hook's ship and Peter remarks his new urges are making it "harder and harder to fly" due to him being unable to "think straight", Alice promises to help him see to his "physical needs" later on. Upon entering the portal and finding the fairies gone, Alice is surprised to find they are in Oz, and Peter immediately runs outside to attack West with the sword, who apprehends both him and Alice from a distance with giant fists made of magic. Elsewhere, Dorothy finds herself surrounded by two pirates, (Note: These are unnamed pirates in the original version, but are Captain Hook and Smee in the Sarah Andersen-illustrated Tapas and Random House version.) and is rescued by an arriving Wendy, who knocks them out and hands Dorothy a sword, who in turn requests her slippers back for a plan of her own.

At Cheshire Crossing, Poppins discovers the girls are gone, and ascertains their current location as Oz after consulting "the spirits of naughty children", proceeds there through a drawing of Castle West given to her by Dorothy (inferring they had already known each other prior to Alice's and Wendy's arrival). (Note: While Poppins was given the drawing of Castle West by Dorothy in the original Weir version, the origin of the drawing is unspecified in the Sarah Andersen-illustrated Tapas and Random House version.) Landing on Hook's ship, Poppins informs West that she has "been very naughty and must be punished", and sets the spirits upon her, having promised them her soul, only for them to be quickly banished to "the light" by West. Recognizing that Poppins is much more powerful than her, West amplifies her power using the fairies and knocks Poppins off the ship in a wave of magical fire. (Note: That Poppins is amplifying her power using the fairies is unspecified in the Sarah Andersen-illustrated Tapas and Random House version.) After challenging Hook to a "duel-thingy", Dorothy cuts the ropes surrounding them, (Note: Dorothy cuts the ropes supporting the bridge they are standing on in the original version, and the ropes of Hook's sail in the Sarah Andersen-illustrated Tapas and Random House version.) causing Hook to fall to his apparent death while Dorothy remains flying thanks to the slippers, having realized that the actual power of the slippers to be mimicry of the inherent powers of whoever wore them last, being Wendy's flight. Dorothy is complimented by the Cheshire Cat as she flies away. Elsewhere, while Poppins recovers in a crater, she encounters Tink, who provides her with a plan to face West. Returning to the ship and announcing "Say hello to my little friend!", Poppins amplifies her own power with Tink's to partially negate that of the fairies West is using, leaving the pair evenly matched. Alice awakens on the ship, and, picking up the Vorpal Sword, breaks open the orb containing the fairies, engulfing West in fire. Recognizing herself to be defeated, West flees by teleporting in a puff of smoke. Elsewhere, rather than taking Hook's crew prisoner, Jack offers to make them his officers and requests use of Hook's still-flying ship, employing Smee as captain, while the Hatter, finding Hook alive, steals his hat and has him hidden away in the castle dungeon.

Later that evening, Wendy hugs Poppins upon seeing her alive, while Alice and Peter each drink a glass wine as they prepare to "see to [Peter's] physical needs" as he had requested; Peter shrinks, as Alice has slipped him shrinking potion in the wine. She says that Peter is "blind to things that are obvious to any woman" and that she "know[s] a woman in love when [she] see[s] one", placing Peter before Tink. Peter remarks he never noticed how good she looked before; Peter and Tink subsequently kiss, while Alice walks away. After Wendy inquires as to Peter's whereabouts, Alice assures her that he is "busy" and "doesn't have a scratch on him. Yet", before leaving to confront Poppins after being told she is looking for her.

Meanwhile, in Wonderland, the Knave of Spades reports Alice's theft of the Vorpal Sword to the Queen of Hearts, and that her court wizard, the Ace of Clubs, has discovered from studying Alice from afar that her body generates a weakness between her world and Wonderland, and were they to enter the rabbit hole that served as her initial entry point to Wonderland, it would take them to her general vicinity. Consequently, the Queen orders the Knave of Spades and the Ace of Clubs to track down Alice and decapitate her.

== Development ==
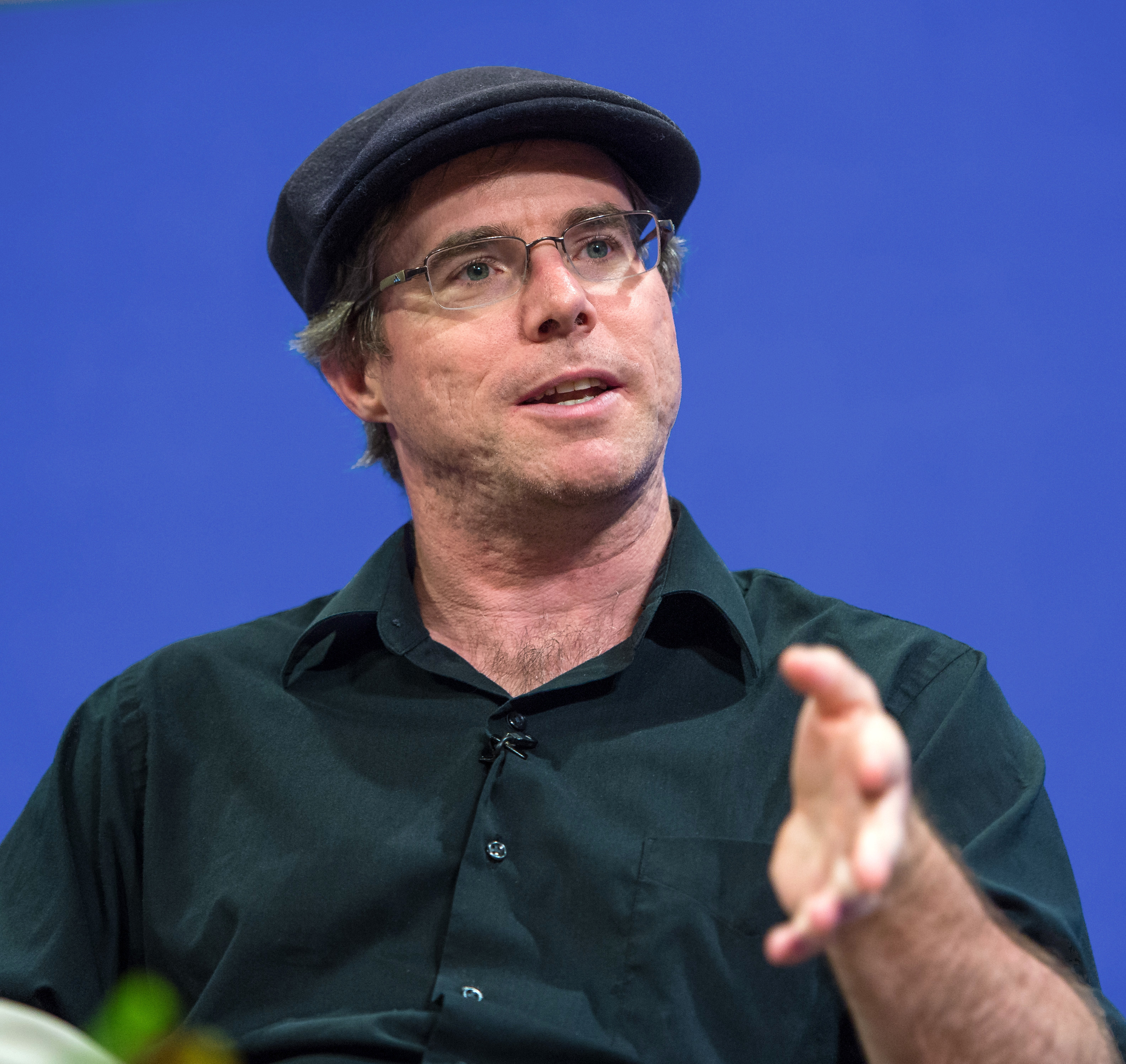
Andy Weir in April 2015.

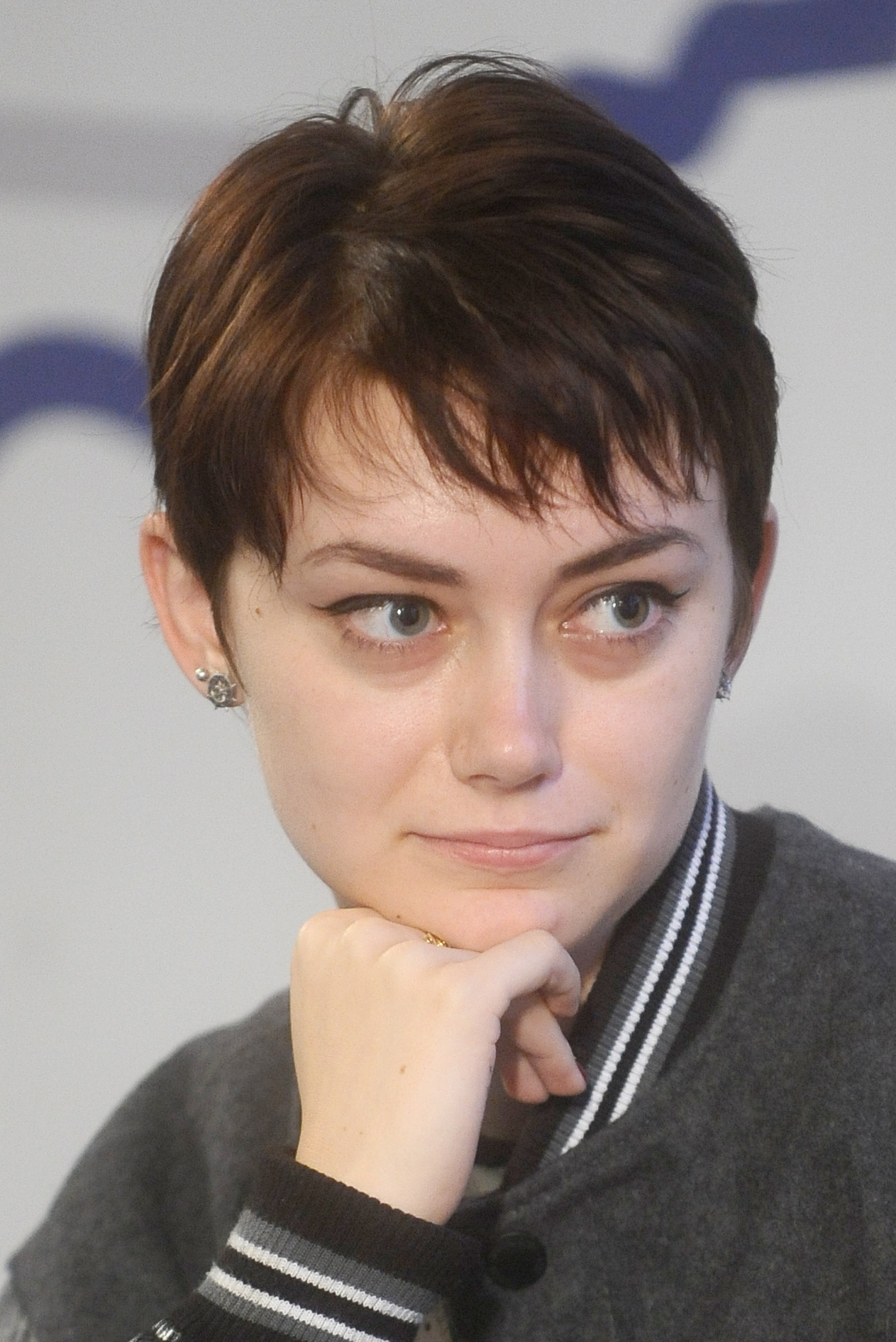
Sarah Andersen at Lucca Comics & Games in 2016.

In a 2008 interview, Weir said that he noticed Peter Pan and The Wonderful Wizard of Oz were both published in 1904 (though The Wonderful Wizard of Oz was actually published in 1900) and he imagined Wendy and Dorothy interacting. After thinking about other children who travel between worlds, Weir said that he thought of Alice, though had to move her story forward from the 1850s. At first he considered a story about girls would be uninteresting, but decided that "women are way more interesting than girls" so set the story several years after the respective books. Weir's comic used characters, settings, and premises from these three series, as well as from P. L. Travers' Mary Poppins series and Gulliver's Travels. Weir has described the comic as "nothing more than a fanfic if you think about it", aiming the comic at "readers of all ages... anyone who felt the magic of those original stories and would be intrigued at seeing the characters from them older, a little more jaded, and interacting with each other." Weir, who was working as a computer programmer at the time, put his webcomic Casey and Andy on hold to create Cheshire Crossing, publishing the webcomic on a personal website from June 2006 to January 2008. Comics were published when an issue was completed, rather than in strips. Weir said in an interview that while publishing Cheshire Crossing as a webcomic allowed him total control over the creative process, he still took feedback from his fanbase. Weir also criticized his own artistic skills, calling his art "utter crap", and said, "art is not at all an enjoyable part of the process. It's an annoying and necessary evil that is required for me to tell my story." The poor reception of the comic, Weir's difficulties with drawing, and the criticism of his artwork led him to end Cheshire Crossing after the first story arc of four issues. He turned to other forms of writing, including science fiction, and published The Martian in 2011. After the success of The Martian, publishers looked at Weir's older works. Weir talked with the syndicate Tapas about publishing some written fiction, during which Cheshire Crossing came up. Tapas proposed that Sarah Andersen illustrate a new version of the comic; Weir had already been a fan of Andersen's Sarah's Scribbles and Andersen was a fan of The Martian. The two worked through Tapas and did not communicate directly when producing the comic. Colors were done by Alison George. Cheshire Crossing was published serially on Tapas from 2017 to 2019. The Andersen-illustrated comic was then published as a stand-alone graphic novel in July 2019 by Ten Speed Press, an imprint of Random House. Due to copyright restrictions from the estate of P. L. Travers, the character of Mary Poppins from Weir's original version was called Miss Gwendolyn Poole in the printed version. Other differences from the original version include the skin colors of Dorothy Gale, Captain Hook, and the Wicked Witch of the West; Lemuel Gulliver only being known as "Lem"; (in the audio play only) Jack the Knave of Hearts being alternatively known as Jack of Knaves and Jack of Hearts; and reduced swearing. In the published graphic novel's foreword, Weir expressed interest in collaborating further with Andersen on the script in addition to her serving as illustrator in potentially developing sequels to Cheshire Crossing.

== Reviews ==
The printed version of Cheshire Crossing received mixed to positive reviews. Some reviewers considered Weir's writing in this story to be worse than his other works, and some thought the story jumped around a lot or was moving too fast. Others considered the story clever and funny and a fresh take on the characters. Andersen's illustrations were generally received well. Several reviewers questioned if the novel, with swearing, sexual references, and references to past trauma, was appropriate for the target age group.

Kirkus Reviews gave the printed version a starred review, describing it as "deliciously funny" and "a shrewd and spirited adaptation". The review describes each main character as each being "a fully three-dimensional protagonist with a distinctive personality that enables her to feel both timeless and timely", and saying that "Andersen's delightful cartoon drawing style meshes perfectly with Weir's prose, allowing the work to broaden its appeal beyond middle graders to young adults and adults." It rated the book as suitable for ages 12 to adult.

Reviewing the print comic for ICv2, Nick Smith gave it four stars out of five. He said that stories about kids coming back from magical adventures and then growing up in the real world was not a new theme, and that the writing was not the best that Andy Weir has done, with many unanswered questions and plot holes. However, he said that "it does give a delightful new side to Andy Weir's writing". He praised Sarah Andersen's artwork as being more detailed than her webcomic work, "and although still not perfect, it was just right for some truly weird moments in the story, which bounces from one world to another at a dizzying pace." He also felt that "the violence, mild sexual innuendo and fake cursing may put this into the middle school collection range".

Publishers Weekly's review was more mixed, saying: "Andersen's large-eyed characters are reminiscent of manga and scenes convey the crux of each world, but Captain Hook is portrayed as the lone protagonist of color, and the story retains stereotypical images of Native Americans in Neverland." (Unlike Publishers Weekly, Kirkus considered Dorothy to have brown skin.) "Other elements—Dorothy's history undergoing 'electric shocks' in sanitariums, a Peter Pan aged to his teenage years and feeling 'physical needs'—seem aimed at an audience older than the stated age range."

The Children's Book and Media Review, run by the Harold B. Lee Library, calls the novel "a complete departure from Andy Weir's Martian and Artemis" and says "his masterful crafting of plot did not quite translate into this work. There are times when the plot of Cheshire Crossing is a little confusing, jumping between different places and at times, losing some intensity. It is also a disappointment that the nanny ends up coming to the rescue of these girls, who in their own original stories, have enough strength to rescue themselves." However it adds that "seeing these characters as older, edgier versions of themselves in graphic novel format and romping through their fantasy worlds is still a lot of fun. The illustrations offer a fresh approach to these characters while still maintaining enough familiarity to be recognizable. Despite its shortcomings, the book is a still an amusing, fresh take on these characters."

Annie McCann, writing for The Nerd Daily, called the story "very clever" and said "this isn't like anything you would have read before". McCann said that the characters are very different, both in mannerisms and appearance, to how they were originally portrayed. She concluded: "The plot is fast paced and the story flowed quickly, it was easy to follow the dialogue in each box. The illustrations didn't look extravagant but were simplistic and elegant. The artwork is suitable for a younger audience, however, the dialogue does include coarse language so please exercise discretion if you choose to read this graphic novel. If you're a fan of graphic novels that features retellings of the classics then definitely give this one a go!"

Writing for her website Comics Worth Reading, Johanna Carlson offered one of the most negative reviews. Carlson said the book "sounds quite promising but turns out to be terrible." She criticized how the story "spends more time on explaining how various magic spells work than developing any of the characters", felt that "the girls all sound alike", and said that there was "battle after battle" where "the action scenes are flat, lacking suspense or a good movement flow." She disliked the aging up of Peter Pan into a horny teenager, and advised against buying it for kids, saying "it's inappropriate, with unsuitably adult topics (what with all the violence and sex jokes), thoroughly unpleasant, and overall, a muddled mess."

== Adaptations ==
=== Audiobook ===
On July 12, 2019, Penguin Random House Audio released an audio drama version of Cheshire Crossing. It was produced by Nick Martorelli and performed by an ensemble cast including Rebecca Soler, Lisa Flanagan, James Monroe Iglehart and Pete Bradbury.

- Sophie Amoss as Alice Liddell
- Brittany Pressley as Wendy Darling
- Kristen DiMercurio as Dorothy Gale
- Rebecca Soler as Miss Poole and the Queen of Hearts
- Lisa Flanagan as the Wicked Witch of the West/Miss West
- James Monroe Iglehart as Captain Hook
- Neil Hellegers as Dr. Ernest Rutherford, the Cheshire Cat and Smee
- Sean Patrick Hopkins as Lem and Jack, the Knave of Hearts
- Peter Coleman as Peter Pan
- Pete Bradbury as the Narrator

=== Film ===
On November 15, 2019, Amblin Partners was announced to be developing a film adaptation, to be produced by Michael De Luca and written by Erin Cressida Wilson.

== See also ==
- Lost Girls by Alan Moore, another comic using the same three main characters
- List of characters in the Oz books
- List of minor characters in the Alice series
- Characters of Peter Pan
- List of A Series of Unfortunate Events characters
