= Lenoir (surname) =

Lenoir or LeNoire is a surname that may refer to:

- Alban Lenoir (born 1980), French actor, screenwriter and stuntman
- Alexandre Lenoir (1761–1839), French archaeologist
- Axelle Lenoir, (born 1979), Canadian comics creator
- Billy Lenoir (1942–2007), American tennis player
- Charles-Amable Lenoir (1860–1926), French painter
- Deommodore Lenoir (born 1999), American football player
- Étienne Lenoir (1822–1900), Belgian engineer, inventor of the internal combustion engine
- Étienne Lenoir (instrument maker) (1744–1832), French instrument maker, inventor of the repeating circle
- Frédéric Lenoir (born 1962), French sociologist, philosopher and writer
- Jean-Charles-Pierre Lenoir (1732–1807), French lawyer and police administrator
- Jean Lenoir (composer) (1891–1976), French composer
- J. B. Lenoir (1929–1967), African American blues musician
- Lance Lenoir (born 1995), American football player
- Maxime Lenoir (1888-1916), French flying ace
- Noémie Lenoir (born 1979), French model and actress
- Pierre Charles Lenoir (1879-1953), French sculptor
- Rosetta LeNoire (1911–2002), American actress, producer, and casting agent
- William Lenoir (general) (1751–1839), American Revolutionary War officer
- William B. Lenoir (1939–2010), American engineer and NASA astronaut
- William Ballard Lenoir (1775–1852), American member of Tennessee state house of representatives
