= Hollow (graphic novel) =

2022 graphic novel

- Date: September 28, 2022
- Page count: 176 pages
- Publisher: Boom! Box

Creative team
- Writers: Shannon Watters and Branden Boyer-White
- Artists: Berenice Nelle and Naomi Franquiz (cover only)
- Letterer: Jim Campbell
- Colorists: Kaitlyn Musto, Kieran Quigley, Gonçalo Lopes
- ISBN: 978-1-68415-852-2

Hollow is a 2022 young adult graphic novel by Shannon Watters and Branden Boyer-White based on "The Legend of Sleepy Hollow". The graphic novel was illustrated by Berenice Nelle.

== Synopsis ==
The story is a modern retelling of the "Sleepy Hollow" legend and follows Isabel "Izzy" Crane, a high school student who recently moved to Sleepy Hollow from the West Coast. Izzy befriends Vicky Van Tassel and Croc Byun, but the three soon realize that an ancient curse is following the Van Tassel family.

== Publishing history ==
It was published by Boom! Box, as a print and digital comic.

== Reception ==
The graphic novel received praise for its art style and writing, as well as its portrayal of diverse characters, including the queer protagonist. An advance review by Ariel Dyer for Comicon.com wrote that it "adds its own unique spin touching on queer romance, high school pranks, and the pressures of family legacy and growing up- all while wrapping readers in a cozy, New England blanket for Halloween season."

Holly Woodbury of AIPT Comics wrote that the colorist's "paint the world of Sleepy Hollow with warm oranges and yellows in the day and cool blues and sickly greens at night" and that main and background characters are drawn with detail and variety.
