= Tom Gauld =

Scottish cartoonist and illustrator

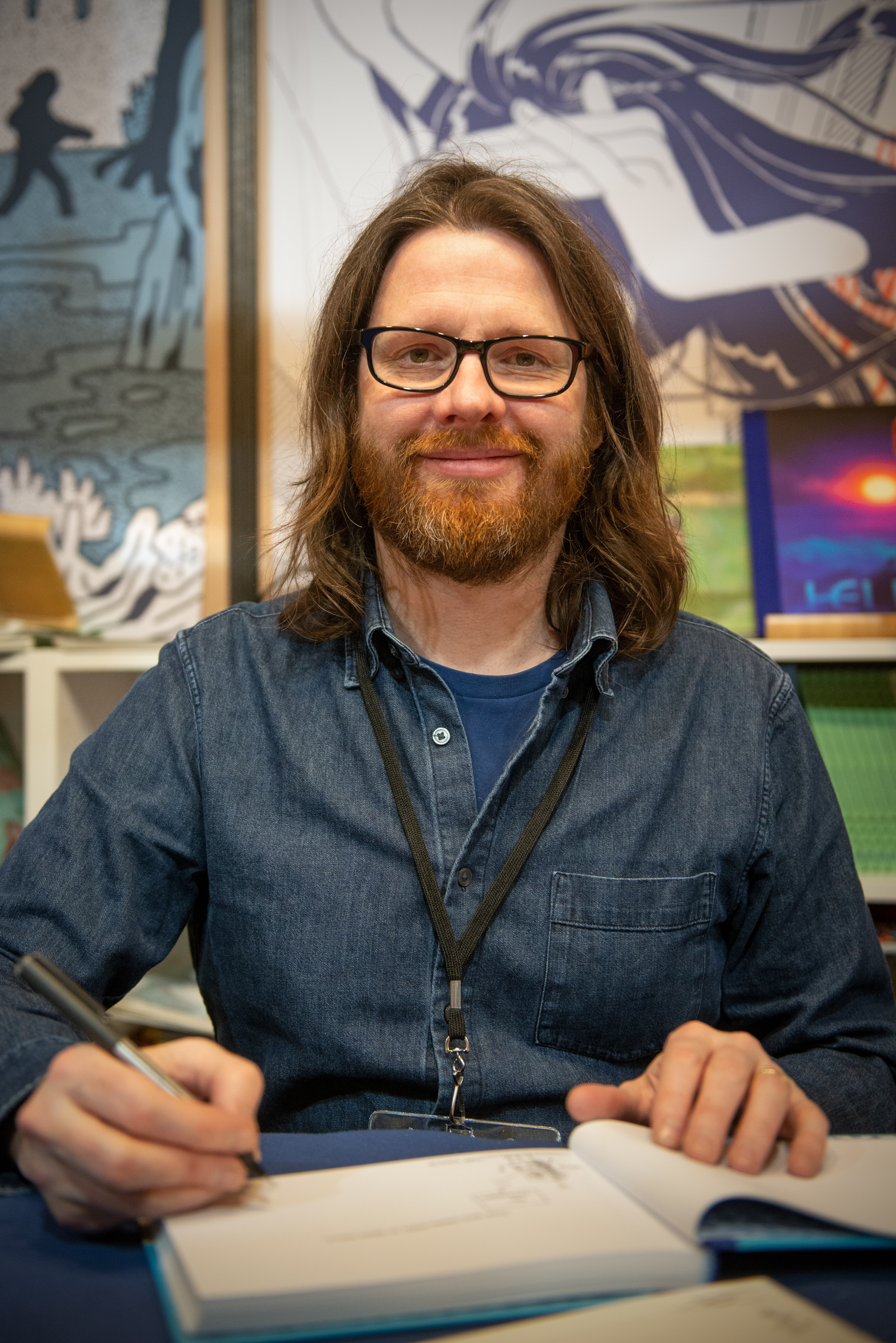
- Born: 1976 (age 49–50); Aberdeenshire, United Kingdom
- Education: Edinburgh College of Art; Royal College of Art
- Known for: Illustration, cartoonist
- Notable work: Goliath (2012); Mooncop (2016); Baking with Kafka (2017)
- Awards: Eisner Award for Best Humor Publication (2018, 2023)
- Website: http://www.tomgauld.com/

Tom Gauld (born 1976) is a Scottish cartoonist and illustrator. He has been awarded the Eisner Award for Best Humor Publication three times, for his books Baking With Kafka (2018), Revenge of the Librarians (2023), and Physics for Cats (2026).

His style reflects his self-professed fondness of "deadpan comedy, flat dialogue, things happening offstage and impressive characters". Others note that his work "combines pathos with the farcical" and exhibits "a casual reduction of visual keys into a more rudimentary drawing style".

== Career ==
Gauld is best known for his comic books Goliath and Mooncop as well as his collections of one-page cartoons. He has also authored a number of smaller-scale books such as Guardians of the Kingdom, Robots, Monsters etc., Hunter and Painter and his cartoon Move to the City, which ran weekly in London's Time Out in 2001–2002.

Gauld studied illustration at Edinburgh College of Art, where he first started to draw comics "seriously", and the Royal College of Art. At the Royal College of Art, he worked with friend Simone Lia. Together they self-published the comics First and Second under their Cabanon Press, which they started in 2001. (The two volumes were subsequently published together by Bloomsbury Publishing in 2003, as Both.)

As part of commercial projects, Gauld has done some animation work; in an interview, he commented that "Comics are a lot of work but animation ... was too much."

His books are now published by Drawn & Quarterly and he regularly produces cartoons and illustrations for The New Yorker (including cover art), The New York Times, The Guardian and New Scientist.

== Influences ==
In a 2011 interview, Gauld listed his "Cartooning heroes": William Heath Robinson, Gary Larson, Roz Chast, Richard McGuire, Ben Katchor, Daniel Clowes, Chris Ware and Jochen Gerner.

== Personal life ==
Gauld grew up in the countryside in North East Scotland, and has said that he had always wanted to be involved with something creative related to drawing. He now lives in London with his wife, artist Jo Taylor, and his children.

While his full-length book Goliath is based on the eponymous biblical figure, Gauld is not religious.

== Bibliography ==
- First (with Simone Lia) (2001)
- Guardians of the Kingdom (2001)
- Second (with Simone Lia) (2002)
- Three Very Small Comics vol. 1 (2002)
- Both (with Simone Lia) (2003)
- Move to the City (French) (2004)
- Three Very Small Comics vol. 2 (2004)
- Robots, Monsters etc. (2006)
- Three Very Small Comics vol. 3 (2007)
- The Hairy Monster: a guide (2006)
- Hunter and Painter (2007)
- The Wise Robot Will Answer Your Question Now (2008)
- The Gigantic Robot (2009)
- 12 Postcards (2010)
- Goliath (2012)
- You're All Just Jealous of My Jetpack (2013)
- Endless Journey: a myriorama (2015)
- Mooncop (2016)
- Goliath (2017)
- Baking With Kafka (2017)
- The Snooty Bookshop: Fifty Literary Postcards (2018)
- Twenty-Four Cartoons (2019)
- Department of Mind-Blowing Theories (2020)
- The Little Wooden Robot and the Log Princess (2021)
- Revenge of the Librarians (2022)
- Physics for Cats (2025)
