= Fangs (webtoon) =

Webcomic and graphic novel by Sarah Andersen

- Cover of published edition
- Author: Sarah Andersen
- Illustrator: Sarah Andersen
- Website: Fangs on Tapas
- Current status/schedule: Completed, published online daily/weekly for its first 76 episodes and physically for its last 25 episodes
- Launch date: October 31, 2019
- End date: July 2, 2020 (Tapas); September 1, 2020 (physical)
- Syndicate: Tapas
- Publisher: Andrews McMeel Publishing
- Genres: Slice of life; Romantic comedy; Comedy horror

Fangs is a slice of life romantic comedy horror comic series written and drawn by Sarah Andersen, following the love story between 326-year-old vampire Elsie "Vamp" and 20-something werewolf Jimmy. Originally published as a webcomic on Tapas for its first 76 episodes from October 31, 2019 to July 2, 2020, a graphic novel of Fangs was published on September 1, 2020 compiling the first 76 and the final 25 episodes, concluding the series with a total of 101 episodes.

Written in a six-month period while Andersen was working on re-illustrating the Andy Weir webcomic Cheshire Crossing, Fangs received a positive critical reception, becoming a New York Times bestseller, winning the 2021 Ringo Award for Best Webcomic and being nominated for the 2021 Eisner Award for Best Humor Publication.

== Plot ==
Elsie "Vamp" is a 326-year-old vampire in a 26-year-old body, and Jimmy is a 20-something werewolf. When Jimmy and Elsie meet at a bar one night, they quickly bond over their shared monster identity. The pair get to know each other through enjoying horror films and novels, shady strolls, fine dining (though never with garlic), and a genuine fondness for each other's unusual habits, macabre lifestyles, and monstrous appetites. Eventually, through a series of humorous moments and mishaps, they fall in love.

== Characters ==
- Elsie "Vamp" – A 326-year-old (Note: In "Childhood Photos", this is revealed to refer to how long Elsie had been a vampire, having been over 26 and freshly turned into a vampire by the year 1693, 326 years earlier, making her 352+.) vampire who was turned at the age of 26, with a like of gothic culture. As a Satan worshipping "vegan vampire", she gets her blood from blood banks.
- Jimmy – A 20-something werewolf with a like of flannel, able to turn into a large white wolf.

== Reception ==
=== Critical reception ===
Comic Book Resources lauded the series for "tak[ing] monster tropes and creat[ing] beautiful parallels with real-world relationship issues", praising Elsie's and Jimmy's "pitch-black humor [which] adds a refreshing openness to their interactions", making for "an utterly charming series [whose] romantic elements make it a light and entertaining read". Screen Rant praised the series' "adorable characters and wholesome chemistry" with a style "so well-written that it's impossible not to love", with Comics Beat similarly complimenting its "breezy, funny" writing style. In October 2020, Fangs made the New York Times Best Sellers list.

=== Accolades ===
Year	Award	Recipient	Category	Result	Ref.
2020	Ringo Award	Fangs	Fan Favorite Award for Best New Series	Won	
2020	Goodreads Choice Awards	Fangs	Graphic Novels & Comics	Runner-up	
2021	Eisner Award	Fangs	Best Humor Publication	Nominated	
2021	Ringo Award	Fangs	Best Webcomic	Won	

== Collected edition ==
Witch Creek Road collections
#	Title	Material collected	Publication date	Pages	Publisher	ISBN
Fangs		Episodes 1–76 + 25	September 1, 2020	112	Andrews McMeel Publishing	978-1524860677
