= Sarah's Scribbles =

Webcomic

- Cover of the first print edition of Sarah's Scribbles, Adulthood is a Myth
- Author: Sarah Andersen
- Website: sarahcandersen.com
- Current status/schedule: Ongoing
- Launch date: 2011

Sarah's Scribbles is a webcomic by Sarah Andersen started in 2011. Andersen initially published the webcomic on Tumblr, but has since released it on various services, such as Facebook, Instagram, Tapas and her own website. Sarah's Scribbles follows Andersen's experiences as a millennial and focuses on themes such as adulthood and maturity. The comic receives millions of views on the Tapas platform and has won multiple Goodreads Choice Awards and a Ringo Award. Andersen has published four print collections of the webcomic: Adulthood is a Myth; Big Mushy Happy Lump; Herding Cats; and Oddball.

== Overview ==
Sarah's Scribbles focuses on adulthood and the maturity of the millennial generation. Andersen described millennials as "liking to laugh at themselves," making common use of self-deprecating humour. The Independent described Sarah's Scribbles as "relatable comics capturing the dilemmas of a bug-eyed millennial who feels ill-equipped for grown-up life." The webcomic is semi-autobiographical, following Andersen's experiences as well as those of her friends and pets. Andersen has said that the main character is "technically" called Sarah, as the character is her, but she avoids using her name, saying: "I feel like people project themselves onto her... I feel like calling her Sarah within the panels has this strange effect of making her more of an individual and less relatable."

Andersen's webcomic follows the messy-haired protagonist, who has to deal with social anxiety, body image issues and laziness. One comic shows Andersen 'borrowing' a sweater from her boyfriend; other topics include being made to feel inadequate by fitness fanatics, dreading Mondays, considering matching socks an achievement while former school friends raise children. The comic has also been described as a satire of "toxic masculinity" by some sources. Andersen said in 2016 she mainly gains inspiration from her own life and from seeing what people on the internet are thinking and feeling.

== Development ==
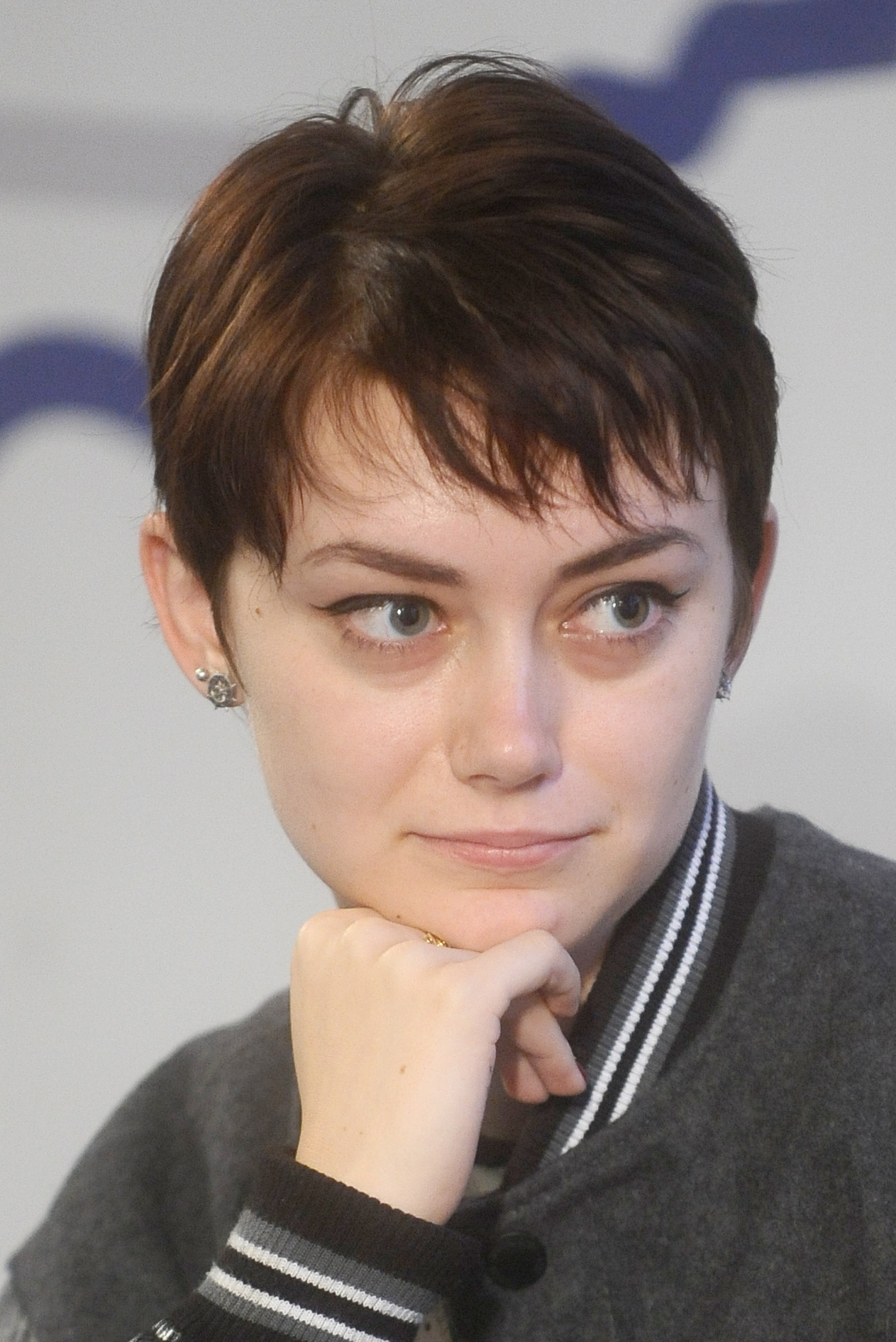
Sarah Andersen at Lucca Comics & Games in 2016.

Andersen started creating and uploading Sarah's Scribbles on Tumblr in 2013. She was studying at the Maryland Institute College of Art at the time, and after she graduated in 2014 she worked on the webcomic full-time. According to Andersen, the comic was originally called Doodle Time, but GoComics asked Andersen to change the name when they syndicated it. Andersen has said that publishing Sarah's Scribbles as a webcomic allows her to observe the reactions of her readership in real time, which she said allows her to do a better job. Andersen's webcomic has a five-panel format, which Andersen developed because it worked well with the scroll display of Tumblr and continues to work well on other websites, such as Instagram.

In March 2016, Andersen released a print collection of Sarah's Scribbles comics titled Adulthood is a Myth. The book was published by Andrews McMeel Publishing. A follow-up was published in March 2017, titled Big Mushy Happy Lump, and a third volume, Herding Cats was released in March 2018, all from the same publisher. Oddball was later released. She has also released a calendar and planner featuring her comics. The first book, Adulthood is a Myth, has been translated into multiple languages, and there are several fan translations of the webcomic.

Andersen said that she is often asked what the character of Sarah "would be like all grown up", and has said that "in some ways Fangs [another comic by Andersen] has the answer."

== Reception ==
Sarah's Scribbles was the second-most read comic on the Tapas platform in 2019, with 46.9 million views and 176,000 subscribers.

Every Sarah's Scribbles book has won the Goodreads Choice Award in the "Graphic Novel & Comics" category, winning in 2016, 2017, and 2018. The webcomic won the Ringo Award for Best Comic Strip or Panel in 2018, and was nominated for Best Comic Strip or Panel and for Best Cartoonist in 2020. In 2024 Andersen won the Reuben Award in the category "Online Comic Short Form".

The Independent has described her first book as "hilarious" and "relatable" and her webcomic as capturing the horrible realization that being a grown-up is pretty awful. The Beat said of Sarah's Scribbles, "bottom line, people like a short laugh that reflects their live as it is lived."
