= The Yakuza's Bias =

Japanese manga series

- First tankōbon volume cover

やくざの推しごと (Yakuza no Oshigoto)
- Genre: Comedy, slice of life
- Manga
- Written by: Teki Yatsuda
- Published by: Ichijinsha
- English publisher: NA: Kodansha USA
- Magazine: Comic Pool
- Original run: June 11, 2021 – May 20, 2022
- Volumes: 2

The Yakuza's Bias (Japanese: やくざの推しごと, Hepburn: Yakuza no Oshigoto) is a Japanese web manga series written and illustrated by Teki Yatsuda. It was serialized on Ichijinsha's digital platform Comic Pool from June 2021 to May 2022, with its chapters collected in two tankōbon volumes.

== Publication ==
Written and illustrated by Teki Yatsuda, The Yakuza's Bias was serialized on Ichijinsha's digital platform Comic Pool from June 11, 2021, and finished on May 20, 2022; a special chapter was published on July 25 of that same year. Ichijinsha collected its chapters in two tankōbon volumes released on November 25, 2021, and July 25, 2022.

The manga has been licensed for English release in North America by Kodansha USA.

=== Volumes ===
| No. | Original release date | Original ISBN | English release date | English ISBN |
|---|---|---|---|---|
| 1 | November 25, 2021 | 978-4-7580-2312-2 | May 16, 2023 | 978-1-64651-801-2 |
| 2 | July 25, 2022 | 978-4-7580-2421-1 | August 15, 2023 | 978-1-64651-802-9 |

== Reception ==
The series has been nominated for the 2024 Eisner Awards in the Best Humor Publication category.
