= Sarah Andersen =

American cartoonist, illustrator and author

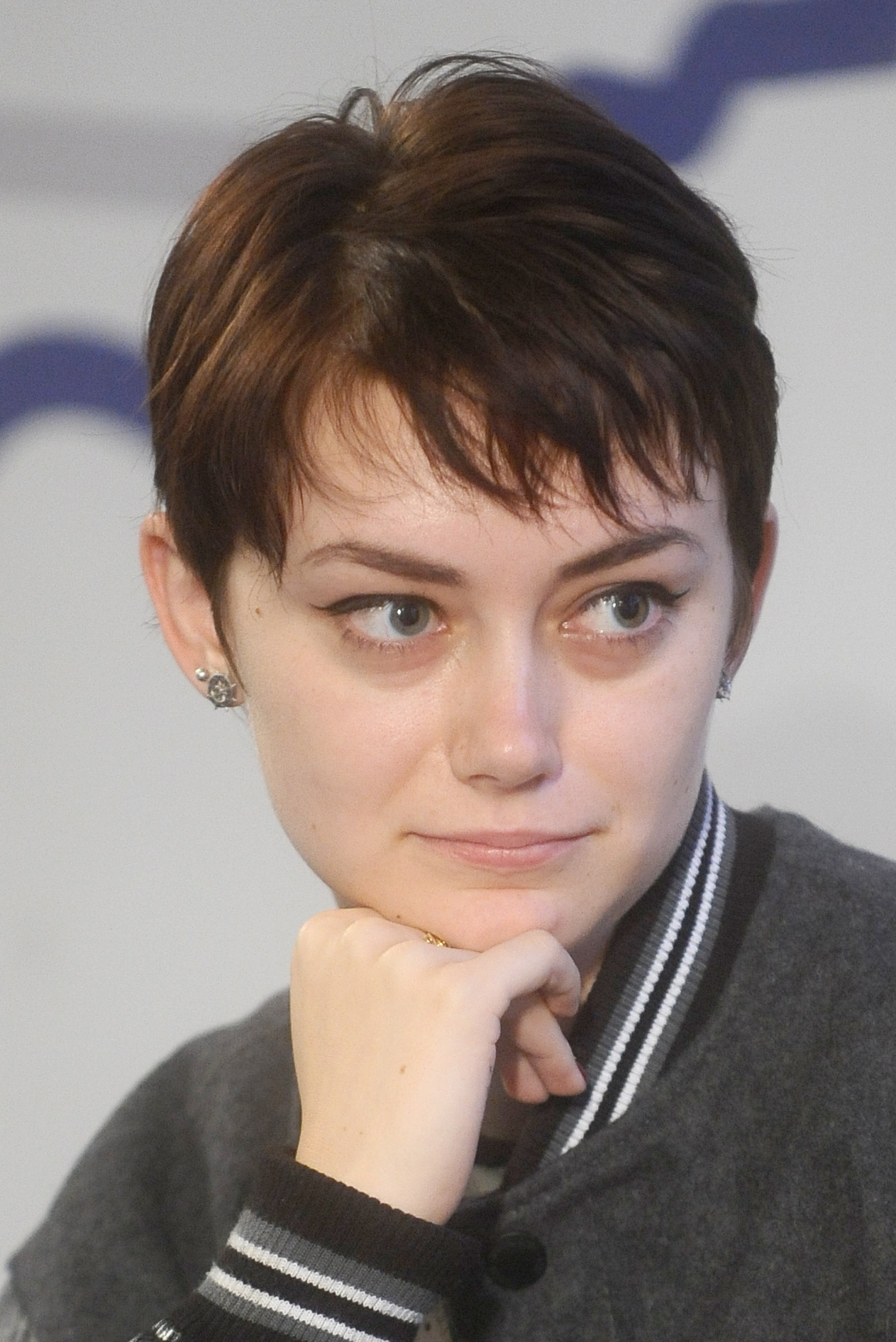
- Sarah Andersen at Lucca Comics & Games 2016
- Born: June 15, 1992 (age 34); Norwalk, Connecticut
- Education: Maryland Institute College of Art
- Writing career
- Notable works: Sarah's Scribbles; Cheshire Crossing; Fangs
- Website: sarahcandersen.com

Sarah C. Andersen (born June 15, 1992) is an American cartoonist and illustrator best known for the webcomics Sarah's Scribbles and Fangs. Currently based in Portland, Oregon, she has collaborated with artists and writers like Andy Weir over the course of her career, and has been recently noted for her public opposition to the rise of text-to-image models and generative AI illustrations.

== Early life ==
Sarah Andersen was born in Norwalk, Connecticut and lived in multiple countries during her childhood, "hopping between Denmark, Germany, and Connecticut." While a student at the Maryland Institute College of Art (MICA), she started drawing and uploading Sarah's Scribbles on Tumblr in 2013; after graduating in 2014, she worked on the webcomic full-time. Originally, the comic was called Doodle Time, but GoComics asked for the name to be changed in order for them to syndicate it.

== Career ==
In March 2016, Andersen released her first print collection of Sarah's Scribbles comics, titled Adulthood is a Myth and published by Andrews McMeel Publishing. They would go on to publish the follow-up Big Mushy Happy Lump the following year, as well as the subsequent volumes Herding Cats, Oddball, and Adulthood Is a Gift! in 2018, 2021, and 2024 respectively. The first book was described as "hilarious" and "relatable" by The Independent, who also praised the webcomic's depiction of "that horrible realisation (...) that being a grown-up is actually pretty awful."

Andersen collaborated with the novelist Andy Weir on the graphic novel Cheshire Crossing, which was released in July 2019. Based on an earlier comic by Weir, the story follows Wendy Darling from Peter Pan, Dorothy Gale from The Wizard of Oz, and Alice Liddell from Alice's Adventures in Wonderland at a boarding school called "Cheshire Crossing."

In late 2019, Andersen began releasing a supernatural romance webcomic called Fangs on the Tapas platform. In September 2020, Fangs was published as a book by Andrews McMeel Publishing. It became a Publishers Weekly Bestseller that month and a New York Times Bestseller in October 2020. It was nominated for the Eisner Award for Best Humor Publication in 2021.

In January 2020, Andersen painted a mural of her characters as part of a public art project in Mexico City, but it was graffitied over within days.

On September 20, 2022, the book Cryptid Club was published by Andrews McMeel Publishing. It was nominated for two Eisner Awards in 2023 for Best Humor Publication and Best Writer/Artist but did not win.

On December 31, 2022, she authored a guest essay in the New York Times about the rise of artificial graphist systems such as Stable Diffusion, pointing out threats it presents on graphic creators such as increased confusion, appropriation, reputational impact, and income reduction. In January the following year, Andersen was listed as a plaintiff in a class action lawsuit against AI companies Stability AI, Midjourney, and online art community DeviantArt. On July 19, 2023, Judge William Orrick III stated he would dismiss most of the case, requesting they elaborate on issues and "provide more facts".

== Bibliography ==
=== Sarah's Scribbles ===
1. Adulthood is a Myth (2016) Andrews McMeel Publishing. ISBN 9781449474195
2. Big Mushy Happy Lump (2017) Andrews McMeel Publishing. ISBN 9781449479619
3. Herding Cats (2018) Andrews McMeel Publishing. ISBN 9781449489786
4. Oddball (2021) Andrews McMeel Publishing. ISBN 9781449489793
5. Adulthood Is a Gift! (2024) Andrews McMeel Publishing. ISBN 9781524890407

=== Graphic novels ===
- Fangs (2020) Andrews McMeel Publishing. ISBN 9781524860677
- Cryptid Club (2022) Andrews McMeel Publishing. ISBN 9781524875541

=== As illustrator ===
- Cheshire Crossing (2019) (with Andy Weir) Ten Speed Graphic. ISBN 9780399582073

== Awards and nominations ==
Published editions of Sarah's Scribbles won Andersen the Goodreads Choice Award in Best Graphic Novels & Comics three years in a row. She won in 2016 for her debut book, Adulthood is a Myth. The following year, she was awarded for her book Big Mushy Happy Lump, and in 2018 for Herding Cats.

In 2021, Fangs won two Ringo Awards for Best Webomic and Best Humor Webcomic.

Andersen won the 2023 Silver Reuben Award in the category Best Online Comics – Short Form for Sarah's Scribbles.
