= Axelle Lenoir =

Canadian comic book author (born 1979)

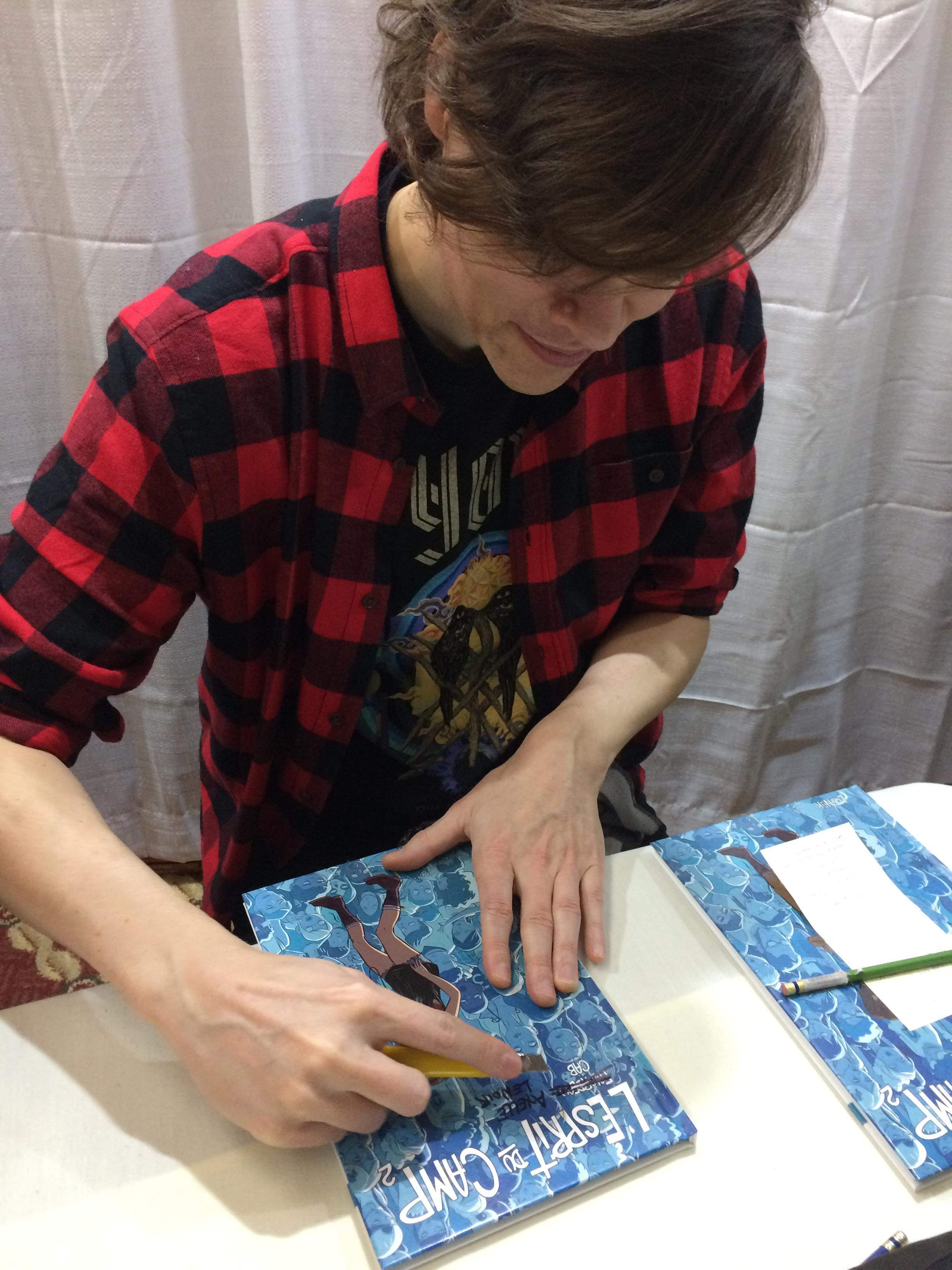
- Born: 1979 (age 46–47); Notre-Dame-du-Lac, Quebec
- Occupation: Comics artist
- Website: https://www.axellelenoir.com/

Axelle Lenoir (born 1979, Notre-Dame-du-Lac) is a Canadian comic book author who lives in Quebec.

== Early life ==
Axelle Lenoir was introduced to comics very early; between the ages of 6 and 9, she discovered Philémon and Spirou and Fantasio in her father's comics collection.

She left home at the age of 16 to study visual arts at the Cégep de Sainte-Foy. In 1998, she moved to Rivière-du-Loup to take a course in graphic design.

== Career ==
After graduating, she returned to Quebec, where she was hired by a video game company. After four years, the company closed its animation department and she decided to start a career in comics

In 2005, she published her first comic book series, Mertownville. It has two volumes: Lydia and 1951.

In 2020, Axelle Lenoir removed references to Harry Potter in her comic What if we were... because of J K Rowling's views on trans people. She replaced them with a reference to the heroines Adora and Catra from the animated series She-ra and the Princesses of Power, known for having featured LGBT characters.

== Personal life ==
Lenoir is transgender. She publicly announced her transition in 2019, in an interview with Curium, a magazine for teenagers where her comic series, What if we were... (Si on était...) was published every week.

== Works ==
=== In English ===
- What If We Were #2 (2023)
- Secret Passages (2022)
- Camp Spirit (2020)
- What If We Were... (2019)

=== In French ===
- Si on était, #2 (2022)
- Passages Secrets (2020)
- Si on était, #1 (2019)
- L'Esprit du Camp #2 (2018)
- L'Esprit du Camp #1 (2017)
- Le Domaine Grisloire #2 (2015)
- Le Domaine Grisloire #1 (2014)
- French Kiss 1986 (2012)
- Luck (2010)
- Mertownville #3 (2007)
- Mertownville #2 (2005)
- Mertownville #1 (2005)

== Awards and nominations ==
- Best First Volume (2006), Lycéens Picards, for Mertownville #1
- Best Volume Published Abroad by a Québécois Writer (2011), Albéric-Bourgeois Prize, for Luck
- Bédéis Causa Prize (2013) for French Kiss 1986.
- Québec Booksellers Prize (finalist, 2018), Comics Category, for L'Esprit du camp #1.
- Québec Booksellers Prize (finalist) for L'esprit du camp, #2
- Eisner Awards nominee in the Best Humor Publication 2021 categorie for What If We Were? (English version of Si on était)
- Comic Book Prize (finalist, 2023) Trois-Rivières Book Fair, Youth Comics Category, for Si on était..., #2
