= Kat Leyh =

American comics writer and artist

- Born: 1988 or 1989 (age 37–38)
- Occupations: Writer, illustrator
- Writing career
- Notable works: Lumberjanes, Snapdragon, Thirsty Mermaids
- Website: katleyh.com

Kat Leyh is an American comics writer and artist. She is known for her work on Lumberjanes, as well as the graphic novels Snapdragon and Thirsty Mermaids.

== Career ==
=== Comics ===
In 2014, Leyh published SuperCakes, a webcomic about two superheroines, one with super-strength and another with the ability to transform into vapor, who are in a relationship. The series began as a minicomic called Pancakes. It received a print release through Yeti Press in 2015.

She is a co-writer and cover artist for Lumberjanes. She has also written for Bravest Warriors.

=== Graphic novels ===
In 2014, Leyh wrote the fantasy graphic novel Bird Witch, about a girl who befriends a tengu.

In 2020, she published Snapdragon, which follows a young girl named Snapdragon who befriends a local woman who is rumored to be a witch. It was a finalist for both the Eisner Award for Best Publication for Kids and the Mythopoeic Fantasy Award for Children's Literature. An animated project based on the book was announced in 2024 by Gaumont Animation.

In 2021, Leyh released Thirsty Mermaids, a fantasy comedy focusing on a trio of mermaids who use magic to transform themselves into humans to get drunk on land only to discover they cannot transform back the next morning. It was a finalist for the Eisner Award for Best Humor Publication and the Lambda Literary Award for LGBTQ+ Comics.

In October 2026, she published Spoke, about a Deaf bike courier in a post-apocalyptic world.

== Personal life ==
As of 2026 Leyh lives in Forest Glen, Chicago.

== Accolades ==
Year	Title	Award	Result	Reference
2020	Snapdragon	Cybils Award for Graphic Novel	Shortlisted	
2021	Snapdragon	Eisner Award for Best Publication for Kids	Shortlisted	
2021	Snapdragon	Mythopoeic Fantasy Award for Children's Literature	Shortlisted	
2021	Snapdragon	American Library Association Rainbow Book List - Young Readers	Top Ten	
2021	Snapdragon	Great Graphic Novels for Teens	Top Ten	
2021	Snapdragon	Quick Picks for Reluctant Young Adult Readers	Top Ten	
2022	Thirsty Mermaids	Eisner Award for Best Humor Publication	Shortlisted	
2022	Thirsty Mermaids	Lambda Literary Award for LGBTQ+ Comics	Shortlisted	

== Publications ==
=== Original graphic novels ===
- Bird Witch. Yeti Press. January 1, 2014.
- SuperCakes. Yeti Press. June 1, 2015.
- Snapdragon. First Second. February 4, 2020. ISBN 978-1250171115.
- Thirsty Mermaids. Gallery 13. February 9, 2021. ISBN 978-1982133573.
- Spoke. Gallery 13. October 13, 2026. ISBN 978-1668052426.

=== Lumberjanes ===
- Stevenson, ND; Watters, Shannon; Ellis, Grace; Allen, Gus; Leyh, Kat; Pietsch, Carey; Laiho, Maarta; Sotuyo (April 11, 2017). Lumberjanes Vol. 6: Sink or Swim. Boom! Studios. ISBN 978-1608869541.
- Stevenson, ND; Watters, Shannon; Ellis, Grace; Allen, Gus; Leyh, Kat; Pietsch, Carey; Laiho, Maarta; Sotuyo, Ayme (December 12, 2017). Lumberjanes Vol. 7: A Bird's-Eye View. Boom! Studios. ISBN 978-1684150458.
- Stevenson, ND; Watters, Shannon; Ellis, Grace; Allen, Gus; Leyh, Kat; Pietsch, Carey; Laiho, Maarta (February 20, 2018). Lumberjanes, Vol. 8: Stone Cold. Boom! Studios. ISBN 978-1684151325.
- Leyh, Kat; Nowak, Carolyn; Watters, Shannon; Stevenson, ND; Ellis, Grace; Allen, Gus; Laiho, Maarta (July 24, 2018). Lumberjanes, Vol. 9: On a Roll. Boom! Studios. ISBN 978-1608869572.
- Leyh, Kat; Watters, Shannon; Stevenson, ND; Ellis, Grace; Allen, Gus; Sotuyo, Ayme; Laiho, Maarta (December 11, 2018). Lumberjanes Vol. 10: Parents' Day. Boom! Studios. ISBN 978-1684152780.
- Leyh, Kat; Watters, Shannon; Stevenson, ND; Ellis, Grace; Allen, Gus; Sotuyo, Ayme; Laiho, Maarta (April 2, 2019). Lumberjanes, Vol. 11: Time After Crime. Boom! Studios. ISBN 978-1684153251.
- Leyh, Kat; Laiho, Maarta; Watters, Shannon; Stevenson, ND; Ellis, Grace; Allen, Gus; Dozerdraws (December 24, 2019). Lumberjanes, Vol. 13: Indoor Recess. Boom! Studios. ISBN 978-1684154500.
- Leyh, Kat; Laiho, Maarta; Watters, Shannon; Aiese, Aubrey; Dozerdraws (May 26, 2020). Lumberjanes, Vol. 14: X Marks the Spot. Boom! Studios. ISBN 978-1684155507.
- Watters, Shannon; Leyh, Kat; Rogers, AnneMarie (August 18, 2020). Lumberjanes, Vol. 15: Birthday Smarty. Boom! Studios. ISBN 978-1684155514.
- Watters, Shannon; Leyh, Kat; Rogers, AnneMarie (December 22, 2020). Lumberjanes, Vol. 16: Mind over Mettle. Boom! Studios. ISBN 978-1684156672.
- Watters, Shannon; Leyh, Kat; Bryant, Kanesha C (February 9, 2021). Lumberjanes, Vol. 17: Smitten in the Stars. Boom! Studios. ISBN 978-1684156672.
- Watters, Shannon; Leyh, Kat; Bryant, Kanesha C; Madrigal, Julie (May 25, 2021). Lumberjanes, Vol. 18: Horticultural Horizons. Boom! Studios. ISBN 978-1684156986.
- Watters, Shannon; Leyh, Kat (August 24, 2021). Lumberjanes, Vol. 19: A Summer to Remember. Boom! Studios. ISBN 978-1684156993.
- Watters, Shannon; Leyh, Kat; Allen, Gus; Bosy, Alexa; Bryant, Kanesha C (November 9, 2021). Lumberjanes, Vol. 20: End of Summer. Boom! Studios. ISBN 978-1684157433.
