= Lumberjanes =

Comic series published by BOOM! Studios

Publication information
- Publisher: Boom! Studios
- Genre: Action; Comedy drama; Coming-of-age
- Publication date: 2014–2020
- No. of issues: 75, plus specials

Creative team
- Created by: ND Stevenson; Grace Ellis; Shannon Watters; Gus Allen
- Written by: ND Stevenson; Grace Ellis; Shannon Watters; Kat Leyh; Faith Erin Hicks
- Artists: Gus Allen; Brittney Williams; Aimee Fleck; Faith Erin Hicks; Becca Tobin; Casey Nowak; AnneMarie Rogers; Felicia Choo; T. Zysk
- Letterer: Aubrey Aiese
- Colorist: Maarta Laiho
- Editors: Dafna Pleban; Bones Leopard

Lumberjanes is a comic book series created by Shannon Watters, Grace Ellis, Gus Allen, and ND Stevenson and published via the Boom Box! imprint of Boom! Studios. The story follows a group of girls spending summer at a scout camp, and the strange creatures and supernatural phenomena they encounter there. Originally planned as an eight-part series, the comic was made an ongoing series following strong sales and critical acclaim. The comic series came to a close after 75 issues with a one-shot finale in December 2020, ending its six-year-run.

== Publication history ==
Lumberjanes came about as the result of Boom! Studios editor Shannon Watters approaching writer Grace Ellis in the hopes of creating a girl-centric comic series. After settling on a story set at a summer camp, the pair brought in Gus Allen for initial character designs and ND Stevenson as a co-writer. The series would be the second published on Boom! Studios' Boom! Box imprint, which aimed to feature experimental, creator-driven work by writers and artists from outside the mainstream comics industry. A single eight-issue story arc was originally planned, but shortly after the release of the second issue, Boom! Studios announced that Lumberjanes would become an ongoing series.

The Lumberjanes characters were featured in a six issue crossover miniseries with DC Comics's Gotham Academy series written by Chynna Clugston Flores with art by Rosemary Valero-O'Connell. The series titled Lumberjanes/Gotham Academy, was released between June and November 6, 2016.

== Overview ==
The story is set in and around Miss Qiunzella Thiskwin Penniquiqul Thistle Crumpet's Camp for Hardcore Lady-Types, a summer camp whose attendees are known as "Lumberjane Scouts". The five scouts of the Roanoke cabin — Jo, April, Molly, Mal and Ripley — witness a mysterious old woman transforming into a bear, and after following her into the woods, encounter a hostile pack of three-eyed supernatural foxes. As more three-eyed creatures start to appear, the girls task themselves with solving the mysteries surrounding the camp.

Over the course of the story, characters earn or refer to various Lumberjane scout badges. The characters frequently invoke the names of notable female pioneers, with phrases such as "Oh my Bessie Coleman!" and "What the Joan Jett?" Each of the first seven issues ends with a track listing for a mixtape prepared by one of the characters.

== Characters ==
=== Campers ===
- Jo is the most cool-headed and analytical member of the group. She is a Navajo transgender girl. She acts as the de facto leader and specializes in the more mathematical puzzles the group faces, and is the most by-the-book of the scouts, knowing the Lumberjane pledge by heart. She has a strong bond with April, including a secret handshake. When Jen is absent, Jo is the most likely to worry about the safety of the group and attempt to rescue her friends. In Vol. 10, "Parents' Day", she and April refer to each other's parents as "uncle", but it is not clarified whether they are related, or that this is meant to imply that their families are close friends.
- April has a flair for the dramatic and a love of puns, and habitually takes notes on the various puzzles the group encounters in her diary. Though outwardly the least physically imposing Lumberjane, she is revealed to be the strongest after successfully arm wrestling a giant living statue. She is also the fact-finder and knowledge base for most of their adventures, and is always ready to face the unknown. She is Jo's best friend, and was the first person Jo came out to. As of issue 73, she has every badge available to Lumberjanes.
- Molly is a skilled archer, but being shy, she sometimes worries that she doesn't contribute enough to the group. However, it is revealed that she has a head for word games and puzzles, and likes to read, loves history, and has the second-most patches of anyone. While Jo or April take the lead and forge ahead, Molly will watch the back of the group, preferring to look after Mal (often anxious), or Ripley (often distracted). She has a raccoon companion named Bubbles whom she wears as a hat and has a mutual crush on Mal. She has a rocky relationship with her family, particularly her mother, while her relationship with her father appears to be relatively neutral.
- Mal, despite her punk appearance, is the most cautious and sensitive of the group. She is Korean-American. She specializes in crafting elaborate plans. She is often paranoid about the dangers facing them at the camp, has a fear of rivers, lakes, and other bodies of water, and is watched over and protected by Molly, whom she loves romantically. They often hold hands and share panels together as a couple.
- Ripley is the youngest and most energetic of the girls, liable to launch herself towards danger without any fear. Her famous move includes drop-kicking things in the stomach, including foxes, yetis, statues, and even Mal, and she sometimes gets her friends to throw her at enemies. She loves animals, from kittens to dinosaurs, and sweet things such as cookies and candy. Despite often being the catalyst for trouble (forcing the others to follow her to rescue her from jumping into white water rapids, for example) she possesses keen insight into other people's feelings, and notices things others will overlook. Molly and Mal are often Ripley's unofficial guardians, and if not them, then Jen. She has a large family, and often bickers with her siblings. She is shown to have a very close relationship with her Abuela. She is half Irish-American and half Afro-Mexican.

=== Camp staff ===
- Jen is Roanoke cabin's scout-leader and is a student in high school. The girls consider her an adult figure, meaning that they are likely on the younger end of their teen years, though it is never specified. Though Jen takes her job very seriously and is often stern with her campers, she genuinely cares for them and tries to protect them from harm. She is extremely knowledgeable about various fields such as botany and astronomy, and usually tries in vain to interest her adventurous campers in safer activities before catching on to the odd happenings at Camp.
- Rosie is the camp scout-master, an easy-going, tattooed woman who enjoys woodcarving (and by dress, tattoos, name, and hobbies, is an obvious nod to Rosie the Riveter, playing into the theme of "Hardcore Lady Types" and feminist empowerment). She seems to know more about the mysterious events surrounding the camp than she is willing to reveal, and encourages the Lumberjanes to keep their eyes peeled, tacitly encouraging them to solve the mystery.

== Collected editions ==
Title	Authors	ISBN	Release date	Comments
Lumberjanes Vol. 1: Beware The Kitten Holy	ND Stevenson, Shannon Watters, Grace Ellis, Gus Allen, Maarta Laiho, and Aubrey Aiese	978-1608866878	April 7, 2015	collects issues #1–4
Lumberjanes Vol. 2: Friendship To The Max	ND Stevenson, Shannon Watters, Grace Ellis, and Gus Allen	978-1608867370	October 13, 2015	collects issues #5–8
Lumberjanes Vol. 3: A Terrible Plan	ND Stevenson, Shannon Watters, Grace Ellis, and Gus Allen	978-1608868032	April 5, 2016	collects issues #9–12
Lumberjanes Vol. 4: Out Of Time	ND Stevenson, Shannon Watters, Grace Ellis, and Gus Allen	978-1608868605	July 12, 2016	collects issues #14–17
Lumberjanes Vol. 5: Band Together	ND Stevenson, Shannon Watters, Grace Ellis, and Gus Allen	978-1608869190	December 13, 2016	collects issues #13 & 18–20
Lumberjanes Vol. 6: Sink or Swim	ND Stevenson, Shannon Watters, Grace Ellis, Gus Allen, Kat Leyh, Carey Pietsch, and Maarta Laiho	978-1608869541	April 11, 2017	collects issues #21–24
Lumberjanes Vol. 7: A Bird's-Eye View	ND Stevenson, Shannon Watters, Grace Ellis, Gus Allen, Kat Leyh, Carey Pietsch, Maarta Laiho, and Ayme Sotuyo	978-1684150458	December 12, 2017	collects issues #25–28
Lumberjanes Vol. 8: Stone Cold	ND Stevenson, Shannon Watters, Grace Ellis, Gus Allen, Kat Leyh, Carey Pietsch, and Maarta Laiho	978-1684151325	February 20, 2018	collects issues #29–32
Lumberjanes, Vol. 9: On a Roll	Kat Leyh, Carolyn Nowak, Shannon Watters, ND Stevenson, Grace Ellis, Gus Allen, and Maarta Laiho	978-1608869572	July 24, 2018	collects issues #33–36
Lumberjanes Vol. 10: Parents' Day	Kat Leyh, Shannon Watters, ND Stevenson, Grace Ellis, Gus Allen, Ayme Sotuyo, and Maarta Laiho	978-1684152780	December 11, 2018	collects issues #37–40
Lumberjanes, Vol. 11: Time After Crime	Kat Leyh, Shannon Watters, ND Stevenson, Grace Ellis, Gus Allen, Ayme Sotuyo, and Maarta Laiho	978-1684153251	April 2, 2019	collects issues #41–44
Lumberjanes, Vol. 12: Jackalope Springs Eternal	ND Stevenson, Shannon Watters, Grace Ellis, and Gus Allen	978-1684153800	July 30, 2019	collects issues #45–48
Lumberjanes, Vol. 13: Indoor Recess	Kat Leyh, Maarta Laiho, Shannon Watters, ND Stevenson, Grace Ellis, Gus Allen, and Dozerdraws	978-1684154500	December 24, 2019	collects issues #49–52
Lumberjanes, Vol. 14: X Marks the Spot	Kat Leyh, Maarta Laiho, Shannon Watters, Aubrey Aiese, and Dozerdraws	978-1684155507	May 26, 2020	collects issues #53–56
Lumberjanes, Vol. 15: Birthday Smarty	Shannon Watters, Kat Leyh, and AnneMarie Rogers	978-1684155514	August 18, 2020	collects issues #57–60
Lumberjanes, Vol. 16: Mind over Mettle	Shannon Watters, Kat Leyh, and AnneMarie Rogers	978-1684156160	December 22, 2020	collects issues #61–64
Lumberjanes, Vol. 17: Smitten in the Stars	Shannon Watters, Kat Leyh, and Kanesha C Bryant	978-1684156672	February 9, 2021	collects issues #65–68
Lumberjanes, Vol. 18: Horticultural Horizons	Shannon Watters, Kat Leyh, Kanesha C Bryant, and Julia Madrigal	978-1684156986	May 25, 2021	collects issues #69–72
Lumberjanes, Vol. 19: A Summer to Remember	Shannon Watters and Kat Leyh	978-1684156993	August 24, 2021	collects issues #73–74
Lumberjanes, Vol. 20: End of Summer	Shannon Watters, Kat Leyh, Gus Allen, Alexa Bosy, and Kanesha C Bryant	978-1684157433	November 9, 2021	collects issue #75 and End of Summer special
Lumberjanes: Bonus Tracks	Faith Erin Hicks, Jen Wang, Kelly Thompson, Holly Black, Gabby Rivera, Chynna Clugston Flores, Rosemary Valero-O'Connell, Christine Norrie, Savanna Ganucheau, Mariana Julia, Gaby Epstein, Maarta Laiho, and Joie Foster	978-1684152162	April 3, 2018	A collection of Lumberjanes short stories.
Lumberjanes: Campfire Songs	Nicole Andelfinger, Maddi Gonzalez, Brittney Williams, Seanan McGuire, Alexa Bosy, Mari Costa	978-1684155675	May 5, 2020	A collection of Lumberjanes short stories.
Lumberjanes: To The Max Edition, Volume 1	ND Stevenson, Shannon Watters, Grace Ellis, and Gus Allen	978-1608868094	December 8, 2015	Hardcover; collects issues #1–8
Lumberjanes: To The Max Edition, Volume 2	ND Stevenson, Shannon Watters, Grace Ellis, and Gus Allen	978-1608868896	September 13, 2016	Hardcover; collects issues #9–16
Lumberjanes: To The Max Edition, Volume 3	ND Stevenson, Shannon Watters, Grace Ellis, Gus Allen, Kat Leyh, Carey Pietsch, and Maarta Laiho	978-1684150038	June 13, 2017	Hardcover; collects issues #17–24
Lumberjanes: To The Max Edition, Volume 4	ND Stevenson, Shannon Watters, Grace Ellis, Gus Allen, Kat Leyh, Carey Pietsch, Maarta Laiho, and Ayme Sotuyo	978-1684151837	June 12, 2018	Hardcover; collects issues #25–32
Lumberjanes: To The Max Edition, Volume 5	Kat Leyh, Carolyn Nowak, Shannon Watters, ND Stevenson, Grace Ellis, Gus Allen, Ayme Sotuyo, and Maarta Laiho	978-1684153121	February 26, 2019	Hardcover; collects issues #33–40
Lumberjanes: To The Max Edition, Volume 6	Kat Leyh, Shannon Watters, ND Stevenson, Grace Ellis, Gus Allen, Ayme Sotuyo, and Maarta Laiho	978-1684154944	March 24, 2020	Hardcover; collects issues #41–48
Lumberjanes Book 1	Shannon Watters, ND Stevenson, Grace Ellis, Gus Allen and Casey Nowak	979-8892155410	September 30, 2025	collects issues #1-12
Lumberjanes Book 2	Shannon Watters, ND Stevenson, Kat Leyh, Gus Allen	979-8892155922	December 23, 2025	collects issues #13-24
Lumberjanes Book 3	Carey Pietsch, Shannon Watters, ND Stevenson, Kat Leyh and Gus Allen	979-8892157292	February 3, 2026	collects issues #25-36
Lumberjanes Book 4	Shannon Watters, ND Stevenson, Kat Leyh, Gus Allen	979-8892157490	April 14, 2026	collects issues #37-48
Lumberjanes Book 5	Shannon Watters, Kat Leyh, Dozerdraws and AnneMarie Rogers	979-8892158473	June 9, 2026	collects issues #49-60
Lumberjanes Book 6	Shannon Watters, Kat Leyh, AnneMarie Rogers, Kanesha C. Bryant and Julia Madrigal	979-8892158732	August 4, 2026 (planned)	collects issues #61-72 and Lumberjanes: Bonus Tracks

== Novels ==
Author Mariko Tamaki and artist Gus Allen expanded the series into a four-book series of middle-grade novels, published by Amulet Books:

1. Unicorn Power! (3 October 2017, ISBN 9781419727252)
2. The Moon Is Up (8 May 2018, ISBN 9781419728686)
3. The Good Egg (30 October 2018, ISBN 9781419740923)
4. Ghost Cabin (10 September 2019, ISBN 9781419733611)

Tamaki and Allen also released The Lumberjanes BEASTiary, a guidebook about the creatures in the series.

1. The Lumberjanes BEASTiary (7 July 2020, ISBN 9781419736445)

== Original graphic novels ==
Boom! Box released a series of original graphic novels, written by Lilah Sturges and drawn by polterink:

1. The Infernal Compass (23 October 2018, ISBN 9781684152520)
2. The Shape of Friendship (26 November 2019, ISBN 9781684154517)
3. True Colors (20 October 2020, ISBN 9781684156177)

== Webtoon ==
In September 2025, it was announced that the series would be rereleased as a vertical scrolling webcomic on Webtoon. The webcomic premiered on October 1, 2026.

== Reception ==
Lumberjanes launched to positive reviews. Many reviewers commented on the importance of the comic as an all-ages, female-led and female-authored title. Alison Berry of Comicosity said that "Lumberjanes is the book that so many have asked for, both accessible and girl friendly without sacrificing entertainment value for the older set... Girls doing for girls is important in comics especially, because it is traditionally dominated by male characters and creators."

Mey Rude of Autostraddle praised issue 17 of the comic where Jo, a "girl of color with two dads", talks about how she is a trans girl, and how it will affect other trans youth. She added that representation like Jo gives kids an opportunity to see themselves in a new light, calling her appearance and role in the comic "something radical", while wondering what this would mean for then-"upcoming Lumberjanes movie", later turned into a series. Caitlin Chappell of CBR argued that the comic easily appeals to kids who like Scooby-Doo, Gravity Falls, and Adventure Time. She further argued that the cast includes several LGBTQ characters like Jo, a de facto leader and trans girl, while saying that Molly and Mal are an "adorable couple." At the same time, she stated that those behind the creation of the series not only talk about the "wonder of camp", but prove that "accepting queer identities should be the norm for children and adults." Finally, Tina Howard of Teen Vogue pointed to "queer leads" in the comics as a whole. She specifically stated that the series writes "LGBT stories that are completely appropriate for young people", while calling it funny, smart, and noting that "features queer and trans young women". She also called it "vital for LGBT kids".

=== Awards and nominations ===
Year	Award	Result	Reference	Notes
2015	Eisner Award for Best New Series	Won		
2015	Eisner Award for Best Publication for Teens	Won		
2015	GLAAD Media Award for Outstanding Comic Book	Shortlisted		
2015	Harvey Award for Best Original Graphic Publication for Younger Readers	Won		
2016	Dwayne McDuffie Award for Kids' Comics	Shortlisted		Vol. 1: Beware the Kitten Holy
2016	GLAAD Media Award for Outstanding Comic Book	Won		
2016	Harvey Award for Best Original Graphic Publication for Younger Readers	Won		
2017	GLAAD Media Award for Outstanding Comic Book	Shortlisted		
2017	Prism Comics Award for Best Comic from a Mainstream Publisher	Shortlisted		Lumberjanes #17
2018	GLAAD Media Award for Outstanding Comic Book	Shortlisted		
2019	Dwayne McDuffie Award for Kids' Comics	Shortlisted		Lumberjanes: The Infernal Compass
2019	GLAAD Media Award for Outstanding Comic Book	Shortlisted		Lumberjanes: The Infernal Compass
2019	Prism Comics Award for Best Comic from a Mainstream Publisher	Won		Lumberjanes: The Infernal Compass
2020	GLAAD Media Award for Outstanding Comic Book	Shortlisted		

== Animated adaptation ==
In May 2015, 20th Century Fox announced it was working on a live-action adaptation. In August 2016, Emily Carmichael was announced to direct the film. In August 2019, the film was canceled by Disney after its acquisition of 21st Century Fox. In October 2020, HBO Max won a bid against Apple and Peacock to release an animated television adaptation of the series. The one-hour animated special introducing the characters will be executive produced and written by ND Stevenson. He will also write and direct episodes for the main series, while serving an executive producer. Additionally, Ross Richie and Stephen Christy, from BOOM! Studios, will be executive producers, as will Mette Norkjaer, Shannon Watters, Grace Ellis, and Gus Allen. After the adaptation was announced, fellow animators, like Matt Braly of Amphibia, Rad Sechrist of Kipo and the Age of Wonderbeasts, Aaron Waltke of Tales of Arcadia, Shadi Petosky of Twelve Forever and Danger & Eggs praised the development. There were similar sentiments from voice actors Liam O'Brien, Sam Riegel, Aimee Carrero, Felicia Day, and Cissy Jones, comic artists Alex Z. Zhang and Victoria Ying, TV writers Shane Lynch and Benjamin Siemon, and comic writers Jackson Lanzing and Dan Slott, among others.

On October 22, 2020, Stevenson stated that the show is in "development, not production" and that there is "no crew at this time." In January 2021, Gumroad said that Stevenson is "steering" the animated Lumberjanes adaptation. as did Morgan Shaunette of CBR. In 2021, Out, ITV, and Polygon described the series as in development, noting the role of Stevenson. In December 2022, Multiversity Comics reported that they were "still waiting for the Lumberjanes TV show", with no news in 2022.

In a June 2023 interview for Deadline Hollywood, Stevenson said he was still "developing Lumberjanes" and "figuring out that world." A New York Times profile of Stevenson, also in June 2023, described him as working on developing the series. In February 2025, ComicsBeat noted that there has no word on Lumberjanes for many years nor any confirmation that the "show was canned" due to the merger of WarnerMedia and Discovery, Inc. into Warner Bros. Discovery in April 2022. In April 2025, Liz Wyatt of Comic Book said that people were "waiting very patiently" for the animated adaptation, noting that "the project isn't dead", said it was likely that "ND Stevenson is still working on adapting the script," and stated that if Max did scrap the series, Netflix could pick it up. The following month, Wyatt wrote that fans are "eagerly awaiting any and all news" about the adaptation.

On September 17, 2025, Stevenson told Comic Book Club that production of the animated adaptation had ended, noting adaptations of the comic went through "many iterations," saying certain issues, including corporate mergers, made working on it "untenable." He noted that the most recent adaptation is "sort of on ice," but opined that it is "a long way from dead" and that he is down to "keep playing with different iterations of it" with the possibility of a stage musical, an RPG, or something else, adding "those conversations are happening. It's just there's nothing solid at this point."
