= Grace Ellis =

American journalist, comic, and television writer

- Born: Grace Ellis Sandusky, Ohio
- Area: Writer
- Notable works: Lumberjanes, Moonstruck, Bravest Warriors, Flung Out of Space

Grace Ellis is an American journalist, comics and television writer. She won the Eisner Award for Best New Series and Best Publication for Teens in 2015 for Lumberjanes and Best Reality-Based Work in 2023 for Flung Out of Space and was nominated for Best Writer.

== Career ==
After college, Ellis worked for Autostraddle where, during an annual sleepaway camp the site hosted, she met Shannon Watters, who was a writer and editor at Boom! Studios. Watters recommended that they make a comic together and they came up with the idea for Lumberjanes. The first issue of Lumberjanes was the first comic Ellis had ever written. Lumberjanes would go on to win the 2016 GLAAD Media Award for Outstanding Comic and to be nominated several more times.

In 2017, she began working on Moonstruck, a romantic comedy set in a world with mythological creatures, alongside artists Shae Beagle and Kate Leth. The comic started as a class project in the Columbus College of Art & Design, where the professor, Laurenn McCubbin, assigned student artists to work with professional writers. After Shae was placed with Ellis, McCubbin liked their story so much, she helped pitch it to Image Comics. It was listed by Entertainment Weekly as one of "10 LGBTQ comics to read this Pride Month."

In 2018, she began writing for Bravest Warriors, where she would write three episodes of its fourth season. In 2020, she and artist Brittney Williams published the middle-grade graphic novel Lois Lane and the Friendship Challenge through DC Comics.

In 2022, her first graphic novel, Flung Out of Space, was published by Abrams Books' new imprint Surley Books, a graphic novel line dedicated to queer creators and curated by Mariko Tamaki. With artist Hannah Templer, the comic looks at the life of Patricia Highsmith and her struggles as a "self-loathing lesbian" writer in the 1940s. Per Ellis, "I want to dig into narratives that we haven't seen before. There's a certain way we talk about influential women and LGBTQ people like they're saints or rebellious in just the right ways, but the truth is more interesting." In addition to winning the Eisner Award for Best Reality-Based Work, it was also on the New York Times's list of 100 Notable Books of 2022.

In 2023, her next middle-grade graphic novel from DC Comics, Diana and the Hero's Journey, was published with artist Penelope Rivera Gaylord.

== Personal life ==
Originally from Sandusky, Ellis currently lives in Columbus, Ohio and went to Ohio State for theater and journalism. She is a lesbian.

== Bibliography ==
=== Boom! Studios ===
- Lumberjanes #1-8 (2014)

=== Image Comics ===
- Moonstruck #1-6 (2017-2018)
- Moonstruck: Some Enchanted Evening (2019)
- Moonstruck: Troubled Waters (2020)

=== DC Comics ===
- Diana and the Hero's Journey OGN (2023)
- Harley Quinn vol. 4 #34, short story "Harley's Big Exit" (2024)
- Harley Quinn vol. 4 #40, short story "Harley Quinn and the Scales of Justice" (2024)
- Lois Lane and the Friendship Challenge OGN (2020)
- Poison Ivy #25, short story "Mushroom Hunters" (2024)
- Titans: Beast World Tour: Gotham #1, short story "Wild Harleys I have Known" (2024)
- Truth & Justice #5 (2021)
