= Casey and Andy =

Webcomic series by Andy Weir

- Author: Andy Weir
- Website: Galactanet
- Current status/schedule: Completed
- Launch date: 28 February 2001
- End date: 25 August 2008
- Publisher(s): LiveJournal, Galactanet
- Genre(s): Action, comedy, superhero
- Followed by: Cheshire Crossing

Casey and Andy (stylised as Casey & Andy, or simply C&A) is a webcomic series written and illustrated by Andy Weir. Following the adventures of two mad scientists (fictionalized versions of Weir himself and his best friend Casey Grimm) and of their friends and acquaintances (such as writer Jennifer Brozek), it was typically updated three times a week, on Mondays, Wednesdays, and Fridays throughout the early 2000s, primarily with a gag-a-comic format, including ongoing storylines and running gags.

The comic has a strong flavor of science and history fact, often from obscure sources, as well as featuring strong parallels between Weir's and Grimm's actual lives and the events in the comic. Some strips are inspired by then-current events, such as with the Opportunity mission to Mars, the 2003 invasion of Iraq and the 2004 United States presidential election. The strip was turned into a roleplaying game titled GURPS Casey and Andy for the GURPS system by David Morgan-Mar in conjunction with Weir, with a PDF sourcebook published by Steve Jackson Games.

On 1 May 2006, Weir announced that the strip would come to an end on Strip 666, due to Weir's recent dread for creating each strip to standard and of the potential for a downturn in the quality of the humor, and also so he could devote his time to Cheshire Crossing, his new webcomic project. Casey and Andy concluded with its 666th strip on 25 August 2008. The character of Bob was later featured in Weir's 2017 novel Artemis.

On 31 December 2021, a Casey and Andy subreddit, created and overseen by David Morgan-Mar, Casey Grimm, and John Gillman, with Weir's approval, was created for the social news and discussion website Reddit. The subreddit published an official crossover comic with the Tredlocity science fantasy webcomic Val and Isaac, starring the character of Space Dread, in January 2022, along with an authorised offline-accessible Mega archive of the webcomic.

== Development ==
In October 2008, Weir revealed the "original idea [behind Casey and Andy to be] based on real life. Casey [Grimm] and I would often do stupid stuff, or have stupid conversations that I thought might be good comedy. That was the original inspiration. The characters quickly took on a life of their own from there, and the “based on real life" aspect of it quickly went away[...] That general strategy of making new characters willy-nilly benefited the strip a lot, I think. There were a few instances of characters I threw in for a gag or two that became excellent sources of plot and humor. For instance, Quantum Cop was originally slated to show up rarely if ever, and always in the context of giving Casey and Andy a ticket. The King of Sweden hanging out on the couch... I never would have expected that to be funny for more than one or two strips, but that well never ran dry." Weir additionally revealed a spin-off series, Anti-Stupid-Science Man, had been considered, but that he could "never figure out how to make it funny". At the 2016 Silicon Valley Comic-Con, Weir sat on the “Master of Webcomics" panel in response to his series, with Tapas App's 2016 promotion on Weir's webcomic start (prior to the launch of Principles of Uncertainty and Cheshire Crossing) additionally citing Bob the Angry Flower as a primary influence for Casey and Andy.

== Synopsis ==
Casey and Andy are 21st-century mad scientists focused on time and dimensional travel, instantaneous cloning, and doomsday devices. They live in suburbia with their girlfriends, Mary and Satan. Also in the mix are a past friend, the now dictator of Japan, a neighbor who wants them dead, and a physics savvy cop intent on their arrest for the breaking the laws of nature.

== Characters ==
Storylines

Key
Main	Indicates character had a main role in the arc
Supporting	Indicates character had a supporting role in the arc
Cameo	Indicates character had a minor or cameo appearance in the arc
Flashback	Indicates character had a flashback appearance in the arc
Mentioned	Indicates character was mentioned in the arc

Characters	Arcs							
Characters	The Story Arc	Overthrow of Hell	Quantum Crook!	Jenn in Time	Great Orb of Power!	Rob Petrone	The Land Pirates	The Finale Arc
Characters	90 – 98	138 – 152	197 – 230	311; 320 – 362	446 – 482	492 – 501	598 – 612	621 – 666
Casey Grimm Dr. X	Main	Main	Main	Main	Main	Main	Main	Main
Andy Weir (ASS)-Man	Main	Main	Main	Main	Main	Main	Main	Main
Mary MacTavish The Pun Police Pun Paladin	Main	Main	Main	Main	Supporting	Cameo	Supporting	Main
Satan Frances Cleveland	Main	Main	Supporting	Main	Cameo	Main	Cameo	Main
Quantum Cop	Main	Supporting	Main	Cameo	Main			Main
The Mime Assassin	Main	Supporting	Supporting	Cameo		Cameo		Cameo
Lord Milligan Milligawain	Main		Main	Main	Main	Cameo		Main
Religious Zealot	Cameo			Cameo		Main		Main
Azrael		Main				Cameo		Cameo
The Cauldron of Fate		Main						Main
Jenn Brozek Queen Jena		Supporting	Main	Main	Main	Cameo		Main
Cujo		Cameo			Main	Cameo		Cameo
Quantum Crook			Main	Cameo		Cameo		Main
Don Cindy Weir			Main	Cameo		Main		
God Zogor			Cameo	Cameo	Main	Cameo		Cameo
Andi Weir Andina			Supporting	Cameo	Main	Cameo		
J.J.				Main	Main			Main
King Carl XVI Gustaf of Sweden					Main	Cameo	Main	Cameo
The Planet Devourer					Main	Supporting		Main
Kasor					Main	Cameo		
Quantum Ninja					Main			
The Bug Fairy					Supporting	Main		
Rob Petrone						Main		
Bob							Main	Main
Grover Cleveland								Main

Most of the comic's events occur in this dimension, and the main characters live here. Due to the high number of characters in this dimension, they are further divided into three categories. The main characters are those most strips focus on, the secondary characters are recurring supportive characters, and single-use characters are characters that appeared only once or twice, or whose role were limited to a single story arc. In an interview with Leesa Hanagan of Sequential Tart on 7 January 2008, Weir cited Peanuts, Bloom County and Stephen Notley's Bob the Angry Flower as the inspiration behind Cheshire Crossing and the then-on-hiatus Casey and Andy.

=== Main characters ===
==== Casey Grimm ====
Casey T. Grimm is the archetype of the mad scientist bent on global domination, based on the man of the same name. One way or another, all of his inventions have something to do with that goal. Having grown up in Fremont as best friends with Andy, they ended up splitting the expenses of maintaining a home. He is totally loyal to Mary, proposing to her in the strip's last story arc. He seems to like and trust Andy, despite Andy's having inadvertently spoiled a number of Casey's evil schemes, but occasionally tries to murder him. His alter-ego is Dr. X, a supervillain whose attempts at evil often cause good instead, although he does easily become dictator of France (before becoming bored with the country and accidentally having them surrender themselves over to Germany).

Casey sports a pointy spike of yellow hair swept forward over his forehead, which only accentuates his large nose. He tinkers more than Andy but spends less time on his computer. Not having his own hovercraft, Casey prefers to improve the house's nuclear arsenal and early warning systems when not working on mad science projects, or burning the house down, a gag later referenced in Ryan Pagelow's Buni Comics.

Not one for mundane ambitions, Casey desires nothing less than to rule the world. He indulges in this pursuit as the black-masked "Dr. X," a secret identity he firmly believes is unknown even to his closest friends. This is despite clear evidence to the contrary, such as when Andy intentionally used the mask to clean the litter box, and delivered him a new mask (mistakenly one meant for Cobra Commander). One time Casey went so far as to clone himself so he and Dr. X could appear together on Casey & Andy's Snooty Discussion Hour. Fortunately (or unfortunately) for the rest of his universe, once Casey realized the clone would not share the fruits of world conquest, he quite sensibly shot the new Dr. X. Casey did get to indulge his passion for ruling (briefly) when Satan asked him to mind Hell while she fought the rebellious demon Azrael, later joining the League of Recurring Antagonists alongside him, and running for President of the United States.

==== Andy Weir ====
Andrew T. "Andy" Weir is a mad scientist, less interested in world domination than in creating mad inventions for their own sake, based on the writer of the same name. His research interests include astronomy, dark, magic, and hamsters. He dates Satan, absolutely hates Casey's girlfriend Mary, and as for Casey, their relationship is complicated, alternating between being best friends and worst enemies, finally fully embracing their friendship after Casey eventually has him move out. His secret alter-ego is Anti-Stupid-Science (ASS) Man. He is the only known male version of himself across the multiverse.

His family recognized his talents when he was young and took the precaution of leaving him at home when they went on vacations to Europe. While still at school, he performed his first Satanic summoning ritual and helped Casey build their first time machine, later naming the units of time travel power "Weirs" after himself. However, it was only as an adult that he and Satan hooked up after she got "stars in her eyes" for the (literally) Hell-bent boy, as foreseen thousands of years before his birth. Andy's best friend is Casey, although the two also compete at everything they do, which more than occasionally escalates to the use of deadly weapons and the usual consequences. Besides mad science, Andy spends time programming, tinkering with his hovercraft, and detonating hamsters. Barely more stable than Casey, he's mostly content to live a placid suburban life of building dimensional portals and dating Satan, including selling out Neo to the Agents. For fun, he likes arguing with evangelists about the logical inconsistencies in religious doctrine. He's sent more than one zealot gibbering to the Fremont Insane Asylum.

Andy's primary vices amount to greed and lust. Despite not needing any more money, he covets it enough to rob the Fremont National Bank on occasion. Sleeping with Satan is usually enough to satisfy his desire for sins of the flesh, but Andy also nurses an anachronistic crush on President Grover Cleveland's young wife, Frances, unaware that she is also Satan, born out of his time-stretched rivalry with Grover himself. In The Finale Arc, their feud is revealed to have been borne on Grover's end of the timeline from Andy travelling back in time to save Jenn after she was stranded in 1886, as well as a later incident in GURPS Casey and Andy, where Grover has access to his own time machine.

==== Mary MacTavish ====
Mary "Mac" MacTavish is Casey's girlfriend and shares the house with him, Andy, and Satan. A grade ahead of Casey and Andy at school, she ran a good line loan-sharking her fellow students – including Andy. This established a long-standing mutual hatred between them. On the other hand, Mary gets along well with Satan, especially when rolling their eyes at their boyfriends' strange antics. Satan, however, is not much for "girl talk". Andy once used Mary as the subject of an experiment, which resulted in her hands acquiring long steel talons that she can extend and retract at will. She fights frighteningly well with them and keeps them sharp for emergencies, while taking care to ensure they never cut her hair, no matter how long it gets.

Mary also hates puns to the point of suffering physical pain when exposed to them. She takes this seriously enough to moonlight as a "Pun Police" officer, complete with uniform and guns. She has shot people more than once for transgressing in her presence. Lord Milligan still gloats that he got her to kill Casey once by giving the mad scientist an irresistible pun opportunity.

Her parallel universe (originating from Dungeons & Dragons) counterpart is the sword-wielding "Pun Paladin".

==== Satan ====
Satan is the fallen archangel and Queen of Darkness, also known as Lucifer "Luci" Morningstar, the Light-Bringer, "grounded" from Heaven by her father, God, for attempting to usurp him. She can assume any shape, and she has chosen this one for now. She is the celestial embodiment of evil and Andy's girlfriend, living in their Fremont house with him, Casey, and Mary. Despite her job and reputation, she is polite and amicable. Satan in her normal form has a forked tongue, a small tuft of hair between her eyes, and horns inspired by the character Rook Bartley from Genesis Climber MOSPEADA and Robotech: The New Generation.

Despite being the ruler of Hell and the second most powerful being in the universe, Satan commutes to work much like any mortal – except that she jumps dimensions rather than taking the bus.

Being a diabolic immortal, Satan gets a lot of perks. Although she doesn't need to breathe, eat, drink, or sleep, she does so to fit in better with her mortal companions. She speaks all the languages of man but not alien tongues (since God only created life on Earth). She's is practically immune to all harm except holy water; turning insubstantial protects her from anything that causes physical damage. She can shapeshift into a dizzying array of demonic and mortal forms, produce fire at will, and shoot jets of fire from her hands. She can possess people, provoke unnatural terror in any who dare contravene her wishes and summon numerous low-grade demons to perform her bidding – even if their loyalty is grudging at best. Still, Satan practices appropriate paranoia since some of her demons are always looking for ways to increase their own power at her expense, having all shoulder demons (in particular Andy's) report to her.

But apart from all that, and despite being evil incarnate, Satan can be a pleasant enough person when she wants to be. She gets along well with her housemates most of the time, which for four people living under one roof is about as good as it gets. And despite her nature, her father – God – is still fond of her and typically overprotective of his little girl. He gave her a few important tasks in the Creation, including finishing off the design for women: she gave them breasts so women would forevermore possess the power to move men to evil. For fun, she occasionally annually works as a mall Santa whenever "Santa" is accidentally misspelled as "Satan" in letters. Satan, of course, likes people to do evil things and quietly encourages such behavior. She tempts mortals to sign over their souls by offering them incredible temptations – or, as in Casey's example, waiting until they're thoroughly distracted by some experiment and asking them to “sign here." However, she cannot directly cause mortals to behave in any particular way and instead so must rely on persuasion and trickery. She can deliberately hide the truth, twist meanings of words, and fail to correct misconceptions, but she cannot actually tell a lie or break her word.

===== Frances Cleveland =====
In The Finale Arc, the 1886-era Frances Folsom (whom Andy had already had an anachronistic crush on in the modern day, and had previously taken an older version of to modern times) is revealed to be Satan herself in an earlier human form, planning to marry Grover, and assume absolute power over mankind (which Grover is aware of but does not care about), who creates Lord Milligan to destroy Casey and Andy, before marrying Grover and becoming the First Lady of the United States, Frances Cleveland.

==== Quantum Cop ====
A very intelligent policeman who can deduce even the strangest courses of events through pure logic, Quantum Cop is never tricked by any excuses. He has won so many Nobel Prizes that he hardly even notices when he receives another one. His intelligence seemingly lapses only when it comes to Jenn, although he later admits he noticed her illegal actions all along. He has two ancestors in 1886, known as the "Newtonian Cop" and the "Cosplay Cop".

Quantum Cop is Officer 3.14 (the first three digits of pi) in Fremont's police force. As an idealist, he strongly believes that law and order are needed to maintain a stable, prosperous society, describing "Quantum probabilities [as] a dicey matter (no pun intended) . . .". In his eyes, nobody is above the law; he once ticketed God, booking Him for various crimes against common sense. God protested but got written up anyway. A true genius, Quantum Cop possesses comprehensive knowledge of all science, particularly modern physics, even beating Satan at chess to regain his life after being shot by Quantum Crook. Despite this astounding intellect, he is not good at applied science, particularly inventing and building gadgets, or lying, a skill which his captain instructs him to learn.

==== Jenn Brozek ====
Jennifer "Jenn" Brozek lives next door to Casey and Andy on Wasatch Drive, therefore repeatedly suffering collateral damage from their failed experiments, as well as being rendered incapable of socializing with more "normal" perople due to always ending up recounting various horrific tales she's involuntarily witnessed in front of them, including having been sent back in time, into hell, and into multiple parallel realities. Based on the writer of the same name, Jenn is later revealed by Quantum Cop to have an abnormal probability curve which results in strange things frequently happening in her vicinity; thus her many adventures are not as a result of her living so close to Casey and Andy, but rather Casey & Andy live next door to her because strange things are destined to happen in her vicinity. She has a crush on Quantum Cop and his parallel duplicate Quantum Crook, and has made repeated attempts to be noticed by them, both remaining clueless about Jenn's amorous intentions. She is the future mother of the time traveller J.J.. During The Finale Arc, it is revealed that she is an international jewel thief (based on Shanex from Weir's novel Theft of Pride) in the present day, after having a successful career publishing her plagiarised Star Wars/The Lord of the Rings-mashup fan-fiction in 1886 on being stranded there: "Sith Lord of the Rings", under the bearded persona of "J. Brozek", and inadvertently creating the first fanboys.

== Themes and story arcs ==
The Casey and Andy webcomic primarily features one-strip gags. Since the two main characters in the webcomic are evil scientists, the two main themes of the gags are science (current scientific events, obscure scientific facts, common mistakes) and evil (world domination ploys, bank robberies, evil inventions). Other common themes for the strip include "Diabolical Riddle Days", "cheesecakes", role-playing games and Christianity; Weir has noted all jokes involving Christianity as having been intended to be done in a completely respectful and non-offensive fashion.

The author does occasionally go into story arcs that span multiple strips.

== Merchandise ==
=== Clothing ===
From October 2004 onward, Weir selling a limited range of white and grey t-shirts, posters and mugs with designs based on the Casey and Andy series imprinted upon them from his website, having previously sold the clothing, alongside original artwork, posters and lapel pins. In both cases, every shirt made available was sold before the deadline set by Weir.

=== Role-playing game ===
On 22 April 2016, in conjunction with David Morgan-Mar, Weir designed and released a role-playing game for the GURPS system based on Casey and Andy, written by Morgan-Mar, and published by Steve Jackson Games. The game, titled GURPs Casey and Andy, follows the titular Andy as he brings Frances Cleveland (a past version of his girlfriend Satan to the present, leading to Grover Cleveland following them to reclaim his position as President of the United States.

=== Animation ===
Weir confirmed that a Flash animation based on Casey and Andy was in development for after the release of Strip No. 413 of Casey and Andy No. 2 via his personal website, releasing it on 24 November 2004. The short follows the minor Casey and Andy character of the Planet Devourer as they go about their day. On 9 April 2006, Weir released a theme song based on Casey and Andy to his website, sung by Corey Vidal and the a cappella group Moosebutter, which was subsequently animated on 12 May 2008.

== Reception ==
In December 2006, Lore Sjoberg of Wired praised the series for "finally address[ing] the still-important affliction of Stand-Up Smugness" with its protagonists, described as those who "assume that anything you don't understand must be stupid [and] repeat the rhetorical questions of stand-up comedians because you think your ignorance makes you look intelligent", in particular citing the "Comedian Night School" arc (from Strip #576).

In December 2008, Morgan Wick negatively described the art style of Casey and Andy, in particular its "Casey and Andy Eyes", as nonetheless having been highly influential across the webcomic genre of the early 2000s, in particular The Wotch, El Goonish Shive, and later issues of the early-started Sluggy Freelance, saying:

"This condition, afflicting many a webcomic but especially those drawn by marginal artists or those overly inspired by anime, has as its major symptom extremely large eyes, often taking up more than half the face, with outlines that stop in the inside. Also accompanying it is rather cartoonish-looking faces, with features formed very simply. No cure is known aside from a general improvement in art skills, either on the part of the artist or, in more extreme cases, a replacement of the artist with someone more skilled."

David Morgan-Mar of Irregular Webcomic! (with which Casey and Andy had a brief crossover) meanwhile described the quality of the series as being on par with, if not superior to, Calvin and Hobbes, stating that not since that series "have I been this excited about an ongoing series", additionally praising Weir for "that very rare thing in the webcomics world — a completed webcomic. Andy Weir actually wrapped up his storyline and wrote a conclusion to the comic, after 666 strips." after Casey and Andy had concluded.

RP Kitty of RPG.net has described the series as "rather hilarious in a completely bizarre way" and "a fun romp of an adventure presented in comic strip form" Speaking with regards GURPS Casey and Andy, Kitty describes the role-playing game as "[a] faithful and well-done adaptation of the Casey & Andy webcomic. Fans of the strip will find much to like here, as will any gamer that enjoys settings, characters, and adventures with a bizarre sense of humor."

Peter C. Hayward of The Chainsaw Blokes described Casey and Andy as an "[a]bsolutely fun read", calling the series "by far one of the best comic strips I've ever read", citing his love for Weir's method of characterisation of the main characters, finding "the rest of the characters [to be] just as likeable too", describing the characters of Casey and Mary as "the most lovable couple ever". Regarding the series' artwork, Reviews described it as "incredible", saying "[t]here's so much attention to detail that it's mind-blowing. I love the expressions people give in the comic whenever _ does something freaky. Their drawn faces and reactions are just priceless. Even [the Mime Assassin]'s expressions are entertaining. While he doesn't talk throughout the series, Andy found a way to let his mood and thoughts let the readers know what he's saying, and this method is brilliant. Also, it's nice to spot some cameos and easter eggs of classic movies in each comic strip".

Graham L. Wilson of icculus similarly lauded Casey and Andy as "one of the best web comics out there", in particular praising the recurring character of the Bug Fairy as "a poignant representation of the feeling that we software developers get that something unseen is wreaking our code", before presenting a homage GIF of the character for his own then-ongoing series Symel, a free content Internet cartoon project first created on 1 January 2006.

Rebecca Salek of Sequential Tart praised Casey and Andy as "geeky fun, [worth] a chance [to read]!", comparatively comparing its protagonists to Riff from Sluggy Freelance, and in particular praising Weir's characterisation of Satan as a "real softie", while WebSnark referred to it as "the future of geek comics [and] a journeyman strip", praising Weir's improving artistic style and the character development of the characters of Satan and Quantum Cop throughout the series.

Reviewing If I Were An Evil Overlord by Martin H. Greenberg and Russell Davis for the MIT Science Fiction Society of the Massachusetts Institute of Technology, Jake Beal favoured the novel in comparison to Casey and Andy as "an evergreen source of geek meta-humor", in particular the events of the webcomic's "Quantum Crook!" story arc.

Sergei and Morag Lewis of Toothy Cat comparatively compared the series to fellow webcomic College Roomies from Hell, described as "another 'me and my mates' comic", with both being "[n]otable for some really quite insane plots and a lack of characters", in addition to "[l]ong stretches of random gags, interspersed with long plots which require accurate quantum physics to navigate provides an interesting tempo", further praising the series' "occasional 'solve this riddle' strips, which would be better if the riddles used were less well known", but nonetheless as "[s]till a nice touch.".

Discussing the role of Death as a concept in the narratives of massively multiplayer online role-playing games, such as Final Fantasy XIV, Eliot Lefebvre of Engadget described the third major approach to the concept as "the Casey & Andy approach, which involves treating the whole thing as the most natural arrangement in the world. You die and come back from death over and over.".

While criticising the art style of the series as "look[ing] like it was drawn in MS Paint", Larsson of Trevliga Scenarion described the series as "prov[ing] the old thesis that a great cartoon can't do without a good script, while a simple cartoon will do as long as the script is great", concluding the series to be a "wonderfully funny and intelligent" read worth re-reading multiple times.

I. Hank of Ricochet praised the series as "a webcomic about mad science" which would "occasionally break into a story with some actual continuity", criticising the series' "character development [as] never Andy Weir's strong point" but complimenting "what he does really, really well is gadgets".

== See also ==
- Andy Weir
- Cheshire Crossing
