= Project Hail Mary =

2021 science-fiction novel by Andy Weir

- Author: Andy Weir
- Audio read by: Ray Porter
- Cover artist: Will Staehle
- Language: English
- Genre: Science fiction
- Publisher: Ballantine Books
- Publication date: May 4, 2021
- Publication place: United States
- Media type: Print, ebook, audiobook
- Pages: 496
- Awards: 2021 Dragon Award for Best Science Fiction Novel
- ISBN: 978-0-593-39556-1

Project Hail Mary is a 2021 hard science fiction novel by American writer Andy Weir. It is about a science teacher and former biologist named Ryland Grace, who wakes up aboard a spacecraft, afflicted with amnesia.

Project Hail Mary received generally positive reviews and was a finalist for the 2022 Hugo Award for Best Novel. The unabridged audiobook was read by Ray Porter and won the 2022 Audie Award for Audiobook of the Year.

The novel was adapted into a film of the same name starring Ryan Gosling, Sandra Hüller, and James Ortiz (as the voice of Rocky, and one of the five puppeteers). Drew Goddard wrote the screenplay (his second Andy Weir adaptation), and Phil Lord and Christopher Miller co-directed. It was released in cinemas on March 20, 2026.

As of the week ending July 11, 2026 the book has been on the New York Times' best-seller list for 57 weeks in total.

== Plot ==
In the near future, scientists observe the Sun dimming at an exponential rate, coinciding with the formation of a dim infrared line from the Sun to Venus (dubbed the Petrova line, after its first observer, Dr. Irina Petrova). As the dimming will cause a catastrophic ice age within thirty years, the world's governments appoint former European Space Agency administrator Eva Stratt to lead a task force to solve the problem, giving her almost unilateral authority. A space probe is sent to Venus to investigate the makeup of the Petrova line.

Stratt appoints Ryland Grace, a junior high school teacher with a PhD in molecular biology, to study a sample from the Petrova line. He discovers that it is made up of single-celled organisms which consume and release electromagnetic radiation, which he names "Astrophage" (Note: Derived from Ancient Greek ἄστρον ástron ("star") and φαγεῖν phageîn ("to eat"); literally, "star-eater".) and determines that Astrophage breeds by absorbing energy from the Sun and carbon dioxide from Venus.

Astrophage has also infected and dimmed nearby stars; however, one star, Tau Ceti, has resisted the infection. A starship, the Hail Mary, is created to travel to Tau Ceti to investigate, using a special engine fueled by Astrophage. Meanwhile, terraforming efforts are made on Earth to increase the greenhouse effect (prolonging the Earth's life) and to mass-produce Astrophage. They can only breed enough Astrophage for a one-way trip, so the mission will return its findings to Earth using unmanned mini-ships called "beetles". Grace trains the two science experts for the mission, but they are killed in an accident shortly before launch. With no time to train a comparably skilled replacement, Stratt forces Grace to join the suicide mission against his will; he is sedated, placed aboard the ship, and administered a temporary amnesia-inducing drug to ensure he does not sabotage the mission out of spite.

Four years and eight months later, (Note: Tau Ceti is 11.9 light-years from Earth, but due to time dilation at relativistic speeds, the time experienced by the Hail Mary is shorter.) Grace emerges from his coma aboard the Hail Mary as it approaches Tau Ceti. He has no memory of his identity or situation, and finds that the rest of the crew members have died en route; over the ensuing weeks, he gradually recovers his memory of the mission. The Hail Mary is approached by an alien starship, which Grace names "Blip-A", after its default display name on the radar. The starship sends a star-map sculpture, indicating it came from 40 Eridani. The ships dock, and Grace develops a system to communicate with the eyeless, spider-like, five-legged, rock-like alien, who he names "Rocky". A skilled engineer, Rocky has been in the Tau Ceti system for 46 Earth years, and is the last survivor of his crew, the rest having died of radiation sickness. As Rocky's planet, 40 Eridani A b (dubbed "Erid" by Grace), is also under threat from Astrophage, Grace and Rocky agree to co-operate.

Grace learns that the Eridians are unaware of relativity, and thus Blip-A has more than enough Astrophage fuel for both ships to return to their planets. Grace and Rocky find Tau Ceti has its own Petrova line and hypothesize that the connected planet, dubbed "Adrian," is home to an organism that preys on Astrophage, keeping its population in check. Grace and Rocky construct a 10-kilometer chain made of xenonite, an Eridian super-material, in order to collect a sample. A hull breach occurs during collection, and Grace and Rocky risk their lives to save each other. From the sample, they identify the predator microbe and name it "Taumoeba." During study, some Taumoeba get into the Hail Mary's fuel lines and eat all of the Astrophage fuel, leaving the Hail Mary stranded in a decaying orbit around Adrian. Grace and Rocky restore electrical power and utilize the beetles to propel the Hail Mary back to the Blip-A.

Grace and Rocky use selective breeding to produce Taumoeba that can survive the atmospheres of both Venus and the planet where Astrophage breeds around 40 Eridani, as the nitrogen found in both planets' atmospheres is deadly to it. Rocky repairs and refuels the Hail Mary before parting ways with Grace. En route to Earth, Grace discovers that he accidentally bred into the Taumoeba the ability to penetrate their xenonite containers. He quarantines them on the Hail Mary but realizes that the Blip-A is made almost entirely of xenonite, meaning that the Taumoeba will consume its Astrophage fuel and leave Rocky stranded.

Grace is forced to choose between returning to Earth as a hero, but dooming the Eridians, or saving the Eridians while facing his own starvation on Erid, where the food is toxic to humans. Grace sends the beetles back to Earth with Taumoeba farms and instructions to save the Sun. He locates the Blip-A and rescues Rocky, who is overjoyed and points out the possibility that Grace could survive by consuming Taumoeba.

Sixteen years later, Grace is living on Erid, now rid of its Astrophage infection. Using Grace's digital archive of human knowledge, the Eridians have built him a comfortable environment and synthetic food. Rocky tells Grace that Earth's Sun has returned to its original luminance, marking the success of Grace's mission. Knowing that humanity has survived on Earth, Grace contemplates going home before returning to his current job as a science teacher for young Eridian students.

== Writing process ==
In a profile in The New York Times, Weir says that after completing The Martian, he began a multi-volume space opera called Zhek, about a substance that could absorb electromagnetic radiation and be used as a fuel for interstellar travel. He wrote 75,000 words before abandoning the project and beginning his novel Artemis (2017). Several elements from Zhek were brought over to Project Hail Mary, including a ruthless bureaucrat character and an energy-absorbing substance used as starship fuel.

Weir told Science Friday that the idea for Astrophage arose out of his desire to have humans discover a fuel that converted matter into energy. He decided having a mad scientist invent it was not believable, and other interesting parts of a crashed alien spaceship would overcomplicate the idea. The idea of fuel that could convert matter into energy sounded biological.

== Publication ==
Project Hail Mary was released on May 4, 2021, by Ballantine Books. The audiobook narrated by Ray Porter uses melodic sound effects in the background whenever "Rocky" speaks.

== Reception ==
Writing for The New York Times, sci-fi author Alec Nevala-Lee wrote "For readers who can forgive its shortcomings, the result is an engaging space odyssey." Kirkus Reviews gave the book a starred review, describing it as "an unforgettable story of survival and the power of friendship—nothing short of a science-fiction masterwork."

In writing her review for The Washington Post, Science Fiction and Fantasy Writers of America president and science fiction writer Mary Robinette Kowal states that the book has several appealing qualities, such as Grace's infectious enthusiasm for science. However, Kowal writes that some of the problems that Grace encounters could have been avoided with common sense and the use of checklists, which are widely used in spaceflight to reduce human error.

A reviewer for Locus Magazine wrote, "Project Hail Mary, however, isn't a simple rehash of The Martian. Instead, it's a celebration of Weir's voice... Weir's jaunty blend of science and fiction in Project Hail Mary is a return to the work that got him where he is." The reviewer for The Boston Globe wrote that "Project Hail Mary is still a suspenseful space yarn that zigs and zags—sometimes literally—in ingenious directions."

Project Hail Mary debuted at number three on The New York Times Best Seller list for Combined Print & E-Book Fiction in May 2021. By August 2021, the book had been on the NYT list for nine weeks. The book reappeared on the list at the number 2 spot during the month of July 2025. Project Hail Mary additionally achieved the #1 spot on the New York Times Audio Fiction Best Seller List for three weeks in February 2022. The audio book briefly returned to the top spot in August 2025.

The novel debuted at number two on the Los Angeles Times SoCal Bestsellers for Hardcover Fiction and number 6 on The Wall Street Journal Bestselling Books List for Hardcover Fiction during the same month. The book was still on the L.A. Times list in mid-August.

In August 2021, Project Hail Mary debuted at number one on the Locus Bestsellers list for hardcovers while remaining at the top position for five consecutive months before dropping to a lower position while still remaining on the list for 11 consecutive months by June 2022.

Bill Gates and Barack Obama added the book to their respective 2021 book recommendations.

== Awards and nominations ==
Year	Award	Category	Result	Ref.
2021	Dragon Award	Best Science Fiction Novel	Won	
2021	Goodreads Choice Awards	Best Science Fiction Novel	Won	
2022	Audie Award	Audiobook of the Year	Won	
2022	Audie Award	Science Fiction	Won	
2022	Canopus Award	Published Long-Form Fiction	Finalist	
2022	Hugo Award	Best Novel	Finalist	
2022	Seiun Award	Best Translated Long Work	Won	
2022	Xingyun Award	Best Translated Fiction	Finalist	
2024	Premio Italia	International Science Fiction Novel	Finalist	

== Film adaptation ==
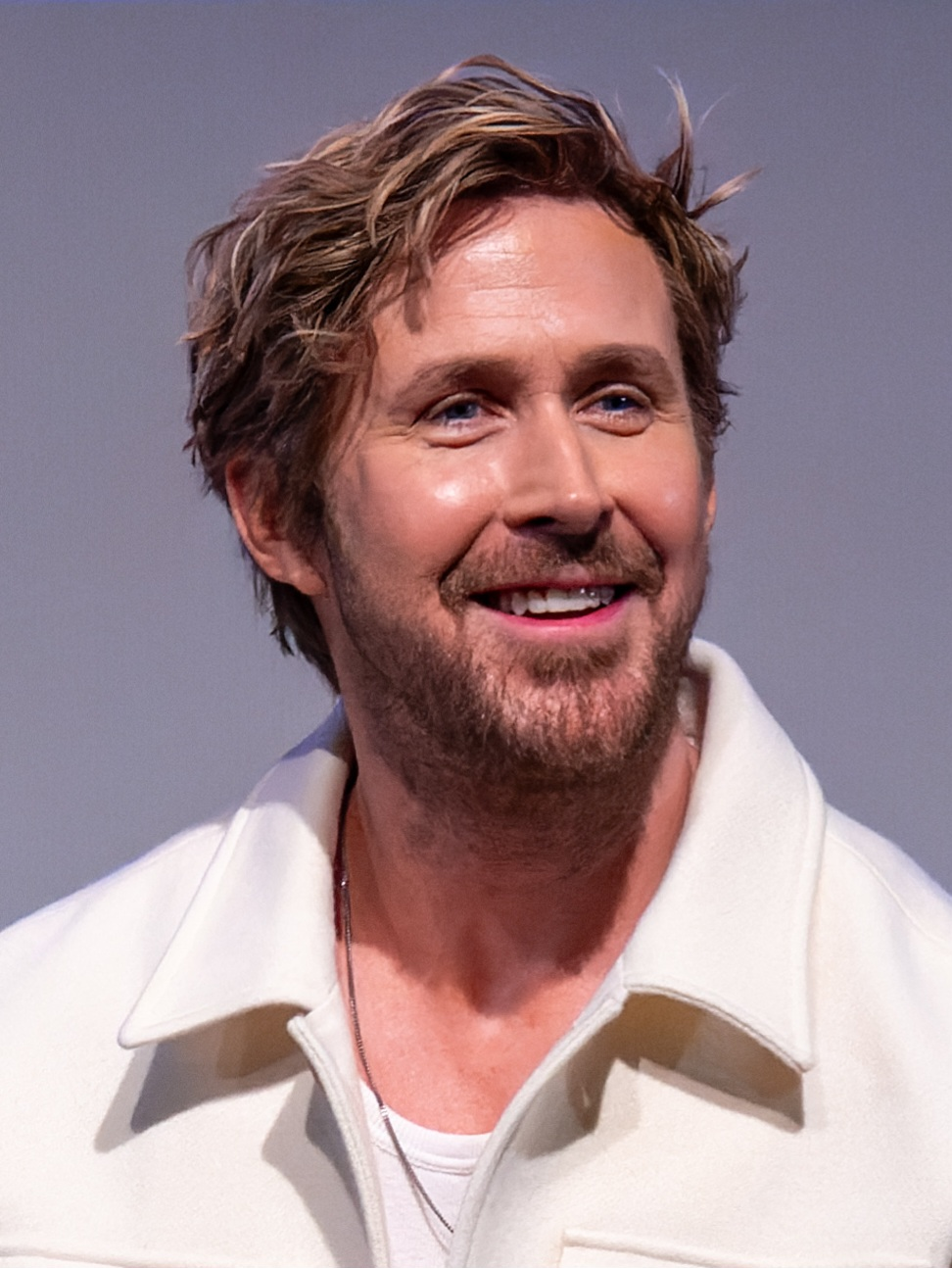
Ryan Gosling, who portrays Dr. Ryland Grace, also served as a producer on the film

Weir sold the book's film adaptation rights to Metro-Goldwyn-Mayer in early 2020 for $3 million. Ryan Gosling signed on to star in and produce the project in March 2020, with Phil Lord and Christopher Miller signing on to direct the film in May and Drew Goddard, who previously adapted Weir's debut novel The Martian into a film, signing on to write the screenplay in July. In May 2023, it was revealed the film would begin production in early 2024 in the United Kingdom. In April 2024, Amazon MGM Studios, which acquired MGM in 2022, announced a possible 2026 release window for the film. Later that month, a release date of March 20, 2026, was set. It was also revealed that Weir would serve as a producer for the adaptation of his novel; Amy Pascal, Aditya Sood, and Rachel O'Connor were announced as producers. Sandra Hüller was added to the cast as Eva Stratt in May 2024.
