= Narration =

Written or spoken commentary for storytelling

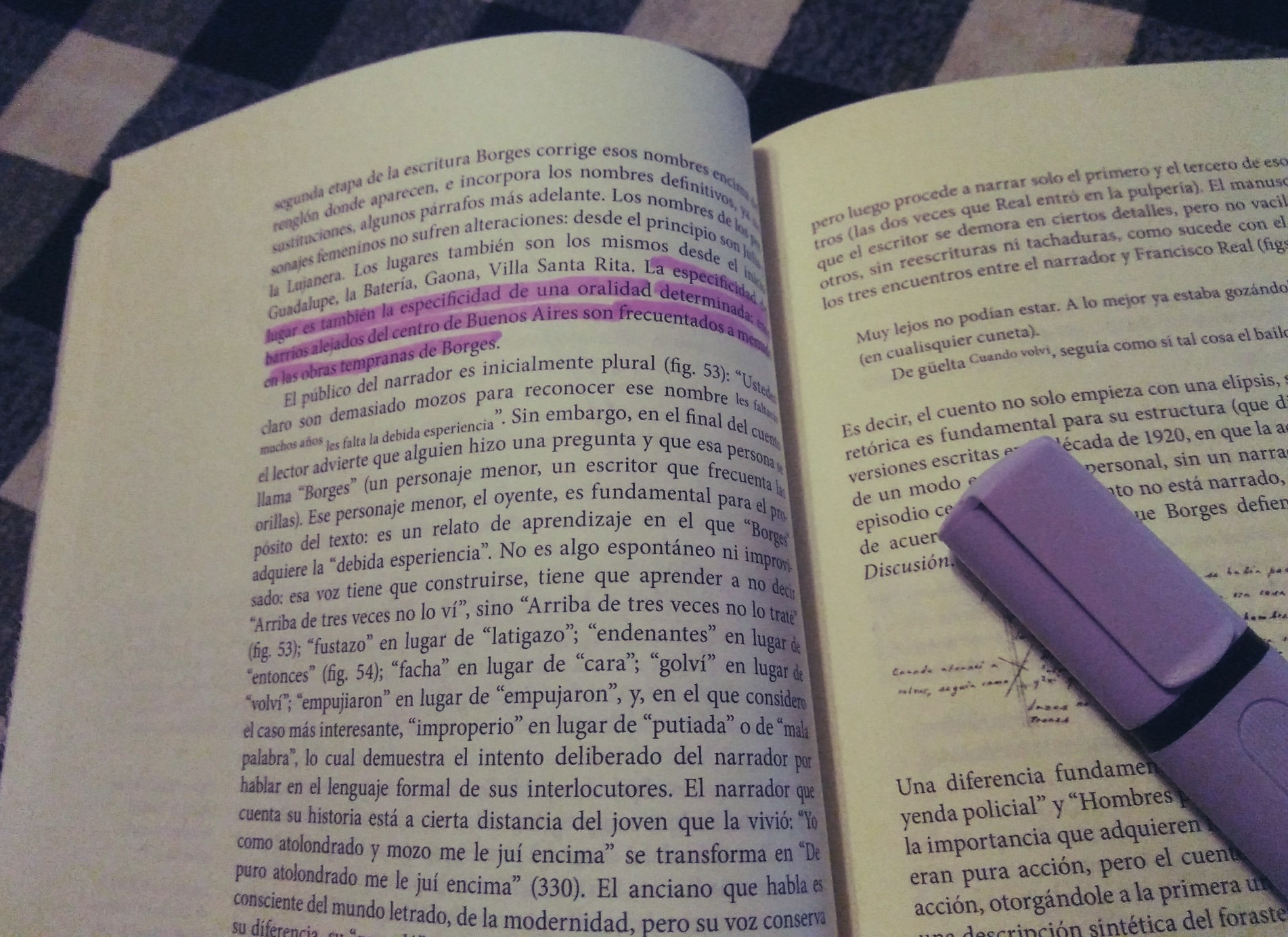
Highlighted section discussion Borges narration style in “El Método Borges” (The Borges Method) by Daniel Balderston

Narration is the use of a written or spoken commentary to convey a story to an audience. Narration is conveyed by a narrator: a specific person, or unspecified literary voice, developed by the creator of the story to deliver information to the audience, particularly about the plot: the series of events. Narration is a required element of all written stories (novels, short stories, poems, memoirs, etc.), presenting the story in its entirety. It is optional in most other storytelling formats, such as films, plays, television shows and video games, in which the story can be conveyed through other means, like dialogue between characters or visual action.

The narrative mode, which is sometimes also used as a synonym for narrative technique, encompasses the set of choices through which the creator of the story develops their narrator and narration:

- Narrative point of view, perspective, or voice: the choice of grammatical person used by the narrator to establish whether or not the narrator and the audience are participants in the story; also, this includes the scope of the information or knowledge that the narrator presents
- Narrative tense: the choice of either the past or present grammatical tense to establish either the prior completion or current immediacy of the plot
- Narrative technique: any of the various other methods chosen to help narrate a story, such as establishing the story's setting (location in time and space), developing characters, exploring themes (main ideas or topics), structuring the plot, intentionally expressing certain details but not others, following or subverting genre norms, employing certain linguistic styles and using various other storytelling devices.

Thus, narration includes both who tells the story and how the story is told (for example, by using stream of consciousness or unreliable narration). The narrator may be anonymous and unspecified, or a character appearing and participating within their own story (whether fictitious or factual), or the author themself as a character. The narrator may merely relate the story to the audience without being involved in the plot and may have varied awareness of characters' thoughts and distant events. Some stories have multiple narrators to illustrate the storylines of various characters at various times, creating a story with a complex perspective.

== Point of view ==
An ongoing debate has persisted regarding the nature of narrative point of view. A variety of different theoretical approaches have sought to define point of view in terms of person, perspective, voice, consciousness and focus. Narrative perspective is the position and character of the storyteller, in relation to the narrative itself. There is, for instance, a common distinction between first-person and third-person narrative, which Gérard Genette refers to as intradiegetic and extradiegetic narrative, respectively.

=== Literary theory ===
The Russian semiotician Boris Uspenskij identifies five planes on which point of view is expressed in a narrative: spatial, temporal, psychological, phraseological and ideological. The American literary critic Susan Sniader Lanser also develops these categories.

The psychological point of view focuses on the characters' behaviors. Lanser concludes that this is "an extremely complex aspect of point of view, for it encompasses the broad question of the narrator's distance or affinity to each character and event…represented in the text".

The ideological point of view is not only "the most basic aspect of point of view" but also the "least accessible to formalization, for its analysis relies to a degree, on intuitive understanding". This aspect of the point of view focuses on the norms, values, beliefs and Weltanschauung (worldview) of the narrator or a character. The ideological point of view may be stated outright—what Lanser calls "explicit ideology"—or it may be embedded at "deep-structural" levels of the text and not easily identified.

=== First-person ===
A first-person point of view reveals the story through an openly self-referential and participating narrator. First person creates a close relationship between the narrator and reader, by referring to the viewpoint character with first person pronouns like I and me (as well as we and us, whenever the narrator is part of a larger group).

=== Second-person ===
The second-person point of view is a point of view similar to first-person in its possibilities of unreliability. The narrator recounts their own experience but adds distance (often ironic) through the use of the second-person pronoun you. This is not a direct address to any given reader even if it purports to be, such as in the metafictional If on a winter's night a traveler by Italo Calvino. Other notable examples of second-person narration include the novel Bright Lights, Big City by Jay McInerney, the short fiction of Lorrie Moore and Junot Díaz, the short story The Egg by Andy Weir, the novel Second Thoughts by Michel Butor, and sections of N. K. Jemisin's Broken Earth trilogy.

You are not the kind of guy who would be at a place like this at this time of the morning. But here you are, and you cannot say that the terrain is entirely unfamiliar, although the details are fuzzy.

— Opening lines of Jay McInerney's Bright Lights, Big City (1984)

Mohsin Hamid's The Reluctant Fundamentalist and Gamebooks, including the American Choose Your Own Adventure and British Fighting Fantasy series (the two largest examples of the genre), are not true second-person narratives, because there is an implicit narrator (in the case of the novel) or writer (in the case of the series) addressing an audience. This device of the addressed reader is a near-ubiquitous feature of the game-related medium, regardless of the wide differences in target reading ages and role-playing game system complexity. Similarly, text-based interactive fiction, such as Colossal Cave Adventure and Zork, conventionally has descriptions that address the user, telling the character what they are seeing and doing. This practice is also encountered occasionally in text-based segments of graphical games, such as those from Spiderweb Software, which make ample use of pop-up text boxes with character and location descriptions. Most of Charles Stross's novel Halting State is written in second person as an allusion to this style.

=== Third-person ===
In the third-person narrative mode, the narration refers to all characters with third person pronouns like he or she and never first- or second-person pronouns.

==== Omniscient or limited ====
Omniscient point of view is presented by a narrator with an overarching perspective, seeing and knowing everything that happens within the world of the story, including what each of the characters is thinking and feeling. The inclusion of an omniscient narrator is typical in nineteenth-century fiction, including works by Charles Dickens, Leo Tolstoy and George Eliot.

Some works of fiction, especially novels, employ multiple points of view, with different points of view presented in discrete sections or chapters, including The English Patient by Michael Ondaatje, The Emperor's Children by Claire Messud and the Song of Ice and Fire series by George R. R. Martin. The Home and the World, written in 1916 by Rabindranath Tagore, is another example of a book with three different point-of-view characters. In The Heroes of Olympus series, written by Rick Riordan, the point of view alternates between characters at intervals.

The Harry Potter series focuses on the protagonist for much of the seven novels, but sometimes deviates to other characters, particularly in the opening chapters of later novels in the series, which switch from the view of the eponymous Harry to other characters. For example, at the beginning of chapter one of Half-Blood Prince, an omniscient narrator describes the Muggle Prime Minister as "sitting alone in his office, reading a long memo that was slipping through his brain without leaving the slightest trace of meaning behind."

Examples of Limited or close third-person point of view, confined to one character's perspective, include J.M. Coetzee's Disgrace.

==== Subjective or objective ====
Subjective point of view is when the narrator conveys the thoughts, feelings and opinions of one or more characters. Objective point of view employs a narrator who tells a story without describing any character's thoughts, opinions, or feelings; instead, it gives an objective, unbiased point of view.

=== Alternating- or multiple-person ===
While the tendency for novels (or other narrative works) is to adopt a single point of view throughout the entire novel, some authors have utilized other points of view that, for example, alternate between different first-person narrators or alternate between a first- and a third-person narrative mode. The ten books of the Pendragon adventure series, by D. J. MacHale, switch back and forth between a first-person perspective (handwritten journal entries) of the main character along his journey as well as a disembodied third-person perspective focused on his friends back home.

The use of multiple narratives in a story is not simply a stylistic choice, but rather an interpretive one that offers insight into the development of a larger social identity and the impact that has on the overarching narrative, as explained by Lee Haring.

Haring provides an example from the Arabic folktales of One Thousand and One Nights to illustrate how framing was used to loosely connect each story to the next, where each story was enclosed within the larger narrative. Additionally, Haring draws comparisons between Thousand and One Nights and the oral storytelling observed in parts of rural Ireland, islands of the Southwest Indian Ocean and African cultures such as Madagascar.

"I'll tell you what I'll do," said the smith. "I'll fix your sword for you tomorrow, if you tell me a story while I'm doing it." The speaker was an Irish storyteller in 1935, framing one story in another (O'Sullivan 75, 264). The moment recalls the Thousand and One Nights, where the story of "The Envier and the Envied" is enclosed in the larger story told by the Second Kalandar (Burton 1: 113-39), and many stories are enclosed in others.

== Tense ==
In narrative past tense, the events of the plot occur before the narrator's present. This is by far the most common tense in which stories are expressed. This could be in the narrator's distant past or their immediate past, which for practical purposes is the same as their present. Past tense can be used regardless of whether the setting is in the reader's past, present, or future.

In narratives using present tense, the events of the plot are depicted as occurring in the narrator's current moment of time. A recent example of novels narrated in the present tense are those of the Hunger Games trilogy by Suzanne Collins. Present tense can also be used to narrate events in the reader's past. This is known as "historical present". This tense is more common in spontaneous conversational narratives than in written literature, though it is sometimes used in literature to give a sense of immediacy of the actions. Screenplay action is also written in the present tense.

The future tense is the most rare, portraying the events of the plot as occurring some time after the narrator's present. Often, these upcoming events are described such that the narrator has foreknowledge (or supposed foreknowledge) of their future, so many future-tense stories have a prophetic tone.

== Technique ==
=== Stream-of-consciousness ===
Stream of consciousness gives the (typically first-person) narrator's perspective by attempting to replicate the thought processes—as opposed to simply the actions and spoken words—of the narrative character. Often, interior monologues and inner desires or motivations, as well as pieces of incomplete thoughts, are expressed to the audience but not necessarily to other characters. Examples include the multiple narrators' feelings in William Faulkner's The Sound and the Fury and As I Lay Dying, and the character Offred's often fragmented thoughts in Margaret Atwood's The Handmaid's Tale. Irish writer James Joyce exemplifies this style in his novel Ulysses.

=== Unreliable narrator ===
Unreliable narration involves the use of an untrustworthy narrator. This mode may be employed to give the audience a deliberate sense of disbelief in the story or a level of suspicion or mystery as to what information is meant to be true and what is meant to be false. Unreliable narrators are usually first-person narrators; a third-person narrator may also be unreliable. An example is J.D. Salinger's The Catcher in the Rye, in which the novel's narrator Holden Caulfield is biased, emotional and juvenile, divulging or withholding certain information deliberately and at times probably quite unreliable.

== See also ==
- Narrative structure
- Opening narration
- Pace (narrative)
- Voice-over
