= Andy Weir =

American novelist (born 1972)

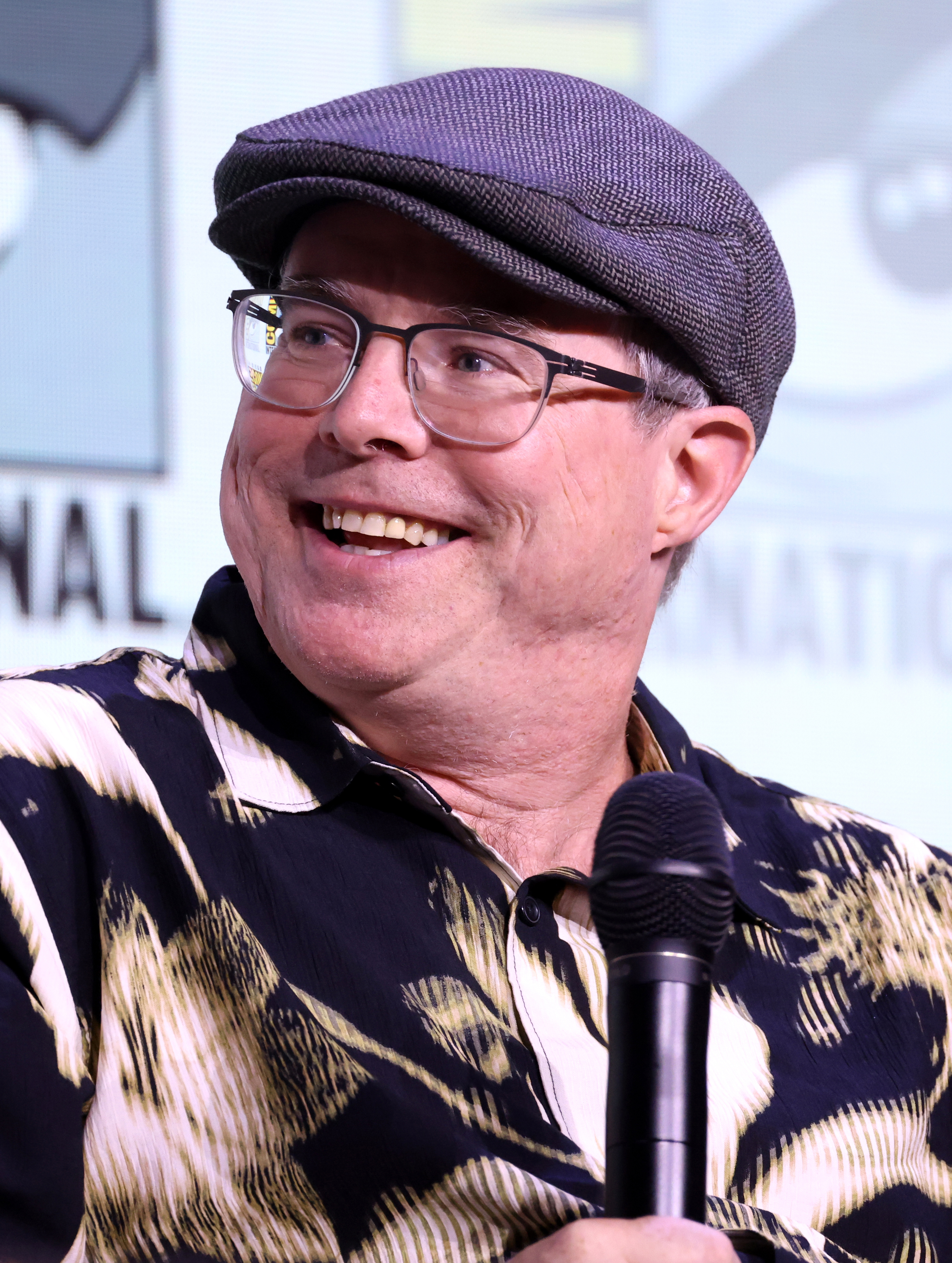
- Weir in 2025
- Born: June 16, 1972 (age 54); Davis, California, U.S.
- Education: University of California, San Diego (attended)
- Occupation: Novelist
- Spouse: Ashley Weir
- Children: 1
- Writing career
- Pen name: Jack Sharp
- Period: 1997–present
- Genres: Science fiction Fantasy
- Notable works: "The Egg"; The Martian; Artemis; Project Hail Mary
- Notable awards: Goodreads Choice Award for Best Science Fiction; John W. Campbell Award for Best New Writer
- Website: andyweirauthor.com

Andy Weir (/wɪər/; born June 16, 1972) is an American novelist. His 2011 novel The Martian was adapted into the 2015 film of the same name. He received the John W. Campbell Award for Best New Writer in 2016. His 2021 novel Project Hail Mary was a finalist for the 2022 Hugo Award for Best Novel, and was adapted into the 2026 film of the same name.

== Early life ==
Weir was born on June 16, 1972, in Davis, California, and grew up in Livermore, California. His father, John Weir, was a physicist at Lawrence Livermore National Laboratory, and his mother was an electrical engineer. He was an only child, and his parents divorced when he was 8. Weir grew up reading classic science fiction such as the works of Arthur C. Clarke and Isaac Asimov. He attended Livermore High School. At the age of 15, he began working as a computer programmer for Sandia National Laboratories.

After high school, Weir studied computer science at the University of California, San Diego, although he did not graduate.

== Career ==
Weir worked as a programmer for several software companies, including AOL, Palm, MobileIron, and Blizzard, where he worked on the video game Warcraft II: Tides of Darkness. Weir was fired from Blizzard in 1995 for poor performance. He later complained that the company's early structure did not provide adequate job training.

Weir began writing science fiction in his twenties and published work on his website for years. He authored a humor web comic, Casey and Andy, featuring fictionalized "mad scientist" versions of himself and his friends (such as writer Jennifer Brozek) from 2001 to 2008. He also briefly worked on another comic, Cheshire Crossing (bridging Alice in Wonderland, Peter Pan, The Wizard of Oz, and Mary Poppins), from 2006 to 2008. The attention these gained him has been attributed as later helping launch his writing career, following his failure to publish his first novel attempt, Theft of Pride. His first work to gain significant attention was "The Egg", a 2009 short story that has been adapted into a number of YouTube videos and a one-act play, and is the overarching concept of 2017's Everybody, the third album by American rapper Logic.

Weir wrote his first published novel, The Martian, to be as scientifically accurate as possible, doing extensive research into orbital mechanics, conditions on the planet Mars, the history of human spaceflight, and botany. Originally published as a free serial on his website, some readers requested he make it available on Amazon Kindle. First sold for 99 cents, the novel made it to the Kindle bestsellers list. Weir was then approached by a literary agent and sold the rights to Crown Publishing Group. The print version (slightly edited from the original) debuted at No. 12 on The New York Times bestseller list in 2014. The Wall Street Journal called it "the best pure sci-fi novel in years". It was adapted into a film in 2015 starring Matt Damon and Jessica Chastain.

In 2015, Weir announced he was working on his second novel, provisionally titled Zhek, which he described as "a more traditional sci-fi novel with aliens, telepathy, faster-than-light travel, etc." A fan-fiction story written by Weir, "Lacero", was published in the 2016 edition of Ready Player One, making it canonical to the book's fictional universe. The work functions as a prequel to the main novel, focusing on the novel's antagonist Nolan Sorrento / IOI-655321. Also in 2016, Weir released The Principles of Uncertainty, a collection of short stories, on the website/app Tapas.

After announcing that the Zhek project had been "back-burnered", Weir moved on to another hard sci-fi novel, Artemis, set on the Moon in the 2080s–2090s. The thriller, published in 2017, follows Jazz, a 26-year-old woman constrained by her small town, which is also the only city on the Moon. In May 2017, 20th Century Fox and New Regency acquired the film rights to the book. On September 26, 2017, it was announced that Phil Lord and Christopher Miller had signed on to develop and direct a film based on the novel. However, the book received mixed reviews with Cassidy Ward of BigShinyRobot writing: "it lacks the kinds of excitement and palpable danger I was expecting and hoping for ... Artemis is a little more fiction and a little less science, and the story suffers for it. Weir brings the same wit and the same love of details (as he did in The Martian) but it never quite feels real enough to lurch your stomach when things go wrong." Weir had considered writing a sequel to Artemis, but ultimately decided against it due to the lackluster reception it received. The film adaptation languished in development hell, and Lord and Miller instead directed an adaptation of Weir's 2021 novel Project Hail Mary. However, they shared during the film's promotion that they still intended to direct Artemis in the future.

In 2017, CBS picked up a pilot written by Weir titled Mission Control, following a group of young NASA astronauts and scientists. In May of that year, Weir collaborated with webcomic artist Sarah Andersen to reillustrate Cheshire Crossing for Tapas, before publishing it as a stand-alone graphic novel in July 2019. In November 2019, a film adaptation of Cheshire Crossing was announced from Amblin Partners and Walt Disney Pictures, to be produced by Michael De Luca and written by Erin Cressida Wilson.

In May 2021, Weir released his third novel, Project Hail Mary. It centers on Ryland Grace, a teacher and former biologist who wakes up afflicted with amnesia aboard a spacecraft. It received widespread positive reviews, winning the 2022 Audie Award for Audiobook of the Year and a nomination for the 2022 Hugo Awards for Best Novel, as well as achieving the #1 spot on the New York Times Audiobook Bestseller List. Ryan Gosling stars as Grace in a film adaptation, with Lord and Miller directing the project.

Although under wraps as to details of title and plot, Weir, as of 2026, is writing a stand-alone science fiction book on artificial intelligence.

== Personal life ==
In 2015, he lived in Mountain View, California. Due to his fear of flying, he never visited the set of the film adaptation of The Martian in Budapest, which is where most of the interior scenes set on Mars were shot. In 2015, with the help of therapy and medication, he flew to Houston to visit the Johnson Space Center and to San Diego to attend San Diego Comic-Con.

Weir is married to Ashley Weir, whom he met while he was in Los Angeles to pitch a TV series. They have one son, born in 2021.

Weir described himself as agnostic and his political views as fiscally conservative and socially liberal in 2012. He has mentioned having aphantasia.

== Awards and nominations ==
Awards of Andy Weir
Work	Year & Award	Category	Result	Ref.
The Martian	2014 Goodreads Choice Awards	Debut Goodreads Author	Nominated	
The Martian	2014 Goodreads Choice Awards	Science Fiction	Won	
The Martian	2014 FantLab's Book of the Year Award	Translated Novel/Collection by Foreign Writer	Nominated	
The Martian	2014 Audie Awards	Science Fiction	Nominated	
The Martian	2015 Seiun Award	Translated Long Work	Won	
The Martian	2015 Killer Nashville Award	Best First Novel - Thriller/Mystery	Finalist	
The Martian	2015 Alex Awards		Won	
The Martian	2015 Premio Ignotus	Foreign Novel	Won	
The Martian	2015 John W. Campbell Memorial Award		Finalist	
The Martian	2015 Geffen Award	Science Fiction	Won	
The Martian	2015 Indies Choice Book Awards	Adult Debut	Won	
The Martian	2015 Killer Nashville Awards	Silver Falchion Award - Thriller/Mystery	Finalist	
The Martian	2015 Kurd Laßwitz Award	Foreign Work	Nominated	
The Martian	2016 Astounding Award for Best New Writer		Won	
The Martian	2018 Goodreads Choice Awards	Best of the Best	Nominated	
Artemis	2017 Goodreads Choice Awards	Science Fiction	Won	
Artemis	2018 Prometheus Award	Novel	Nominated	
Artemis	2018 Dragon Awards	Science Fiction Novel	Won	
Artemis	2019 Audie Awards	Science Fiction	Nominated	
Artemis	2019 Seiun Award	Translated Long Work	Nominated	
Artemis	2019 Geffen Award	Science Fiction	Won	
Project Hail Mary	2021 Dragon Awards	Science Fiction Novel	Won	
Project Hail Mary	2021 Goodreads Choice Awards	Science Fiction	Won	
Project Hail Mary	2022 Seiun Award	Translated Long Work	Won	
Project Hail Mary	2022 Audie Awards	Audiobook of the Year	Won	
Project Hail Mary	2022 Audie Awards	Science Fiction	Won	
Project Hail Mary	2022 RUSA CODES Reading List	Science Fiction	Shortlisted	
Project Hail Mary	2022 Locus Award	SF Novel	Nominated	
Project Hail Mary	2022 Hugo Award	Novel	Nominated	
Project Hail Mary	2022 Kurd Laßwitz Award	Foreign Work	Nominated	
Project Hail Mary	2023 Geffen Award	Science Fiction	Won	

== Works ==
Weir's original website lists his works, with free versions of many of his short stories.

=== Novels ===
- Theft of Pride (web version 2000)
- The Martian (web version 2011; Random House 2014) ISBN 978-0804139021
  - "Diary of an AssCan" (2015), free short story prequel to The Martian
  - "The Martian: Lost Sols" (2024), free short story in celebration of the 10th anniversary of The Martian
- Artemis (Random House 2017) ISBN 978-0553448122
- Project Hail Mary (Random House 2021) ISBN 978-0593135204

=== Serial novels and long stories ===
- Bonnie MacKenzie: The Life Story of a Mermaid
- Moriarty (Holmesian fan fiction)
- The Romana Chronicles/The Xoloans (Doctor Who fan fiction)
- Randomize (Amazon Original Stories: Forward collection)

=== Short stories ===
- Principles of Uncertainty (collection of flash fiction, Tapas e-book 2016). Includes the following stories:
  - "Access"
  - "Annie's Day"
  - "Antihypoxiant"
  - "Meeting Sarah"
  - "The Midtown Butcher"
  - "The Chef"
  - "The Egg" (short story/audiobook) 2009
  - "The Real Deal"
  - "Yuri Gagarin Saves the Galaxy"
- "Bored World"
- "Twarrior"
- "Rat"
- "Randomize" (part of the "Forward" collection)
- "Lacero", prequel to Ready Player One (Ernest Cline, ed.), Subterranean Press 2016

=== Comics and graphic novels ===
- Casey and Andy (2001–2008), a webcomic written and drawn by Weir
- Cheshire Crossing (independent web version 2006–2008 with art by Weir; Tapas web version 2017–2019 and Random House 2019 with art by Sarah Andersen) ISBN 978-0399582073

=== Audio ===
- James Moriarty, Consulting Criminal (Audible Studios 2017)
- The Egg and Other Stories (Audible Studios 2017)

=== Sourcebooks ===
- GURPS Casey and Andy (artwork by Weir; written by David Morgan-Mar based on Weir's webcomic; Steve Jackson Games 2005)

=== Other works ===
- Der Mars Survival Guide (in German), an interview with Weir and his tips for surviving on Mars, published as a booklet
