= The Egg (Weir short story) =

2009 short story by Andy Weir

- Short story by Andy Weir
- Country: United States
- Language: English

Publication
- Published in: Galactanet
- Media type: Online
- Publication date: August 15, 2009

"The Egg" is a short story by American writer Andy Weir, first published on his website Galactanet on August 15, 2009. It is Weir's most popular short story and has been translated into over 30 languages by readers. The story follows a nameless 48-year-old man who discovers the "meaning of life" after he dies.

== Summary ==
The story concerns an anonymous protagonist (referred to as "you") and "the being" (referred to as "me"). You, a 48-year-old man who dies in a car crash, meet the being, the narrator, who says that you have been reincarnated many times before, and that you will next be reincarnated as a Chinese peasant girl in 540 AD. The being then explains that you are constantly reincarnated across time, and that all human beings who have ever lived and will ever live are incarnations of you. You mention being Abraham Lincoln, Adolf Hitler, and Jesus. The being adds that you were also once John Wilkes Booth, every Holocaust victim and every person who followed Jesus.

It explains that there are other godlike beings elsewhere, and that you too will one day become a god. The entire universe was created as an egg for you (all of humanity), and that once you have lived every human life ever, you will be born as a god. The reason the being created the universe was for the main character, you, to understand this point:

Every time you victimized someone... you were victimizing yourself. Every act of kindness you’ve done, you’ve done to yourself. Every happy and sad moment ever experienced by any human was, or will be, experienced by you.

== History ==
In a 2015 interview with the Craftsman Founder Podcast, Weir discussed his motivation for writing "The Egg", among other topics. In the interview, Weir stated that he "wanted to write a story where life was fair after all". According to Weir, most religions have their own take on the proverb "what goes around comes around" and revolve around this idea in some way. When asked why he chose to have one soul reincarnating in eternity instead of forward through linear time, Weir said that the only way his idea of everyone being one soul would work was if reincarnation could happen across time. Weir stated that he wrote the story quickly, saying "I banged it out in 40 minutes and posted it, and that was it", with him not expecting the traction that the story got after it was published.

== Adaptations ==
Rapper Logic used "The Egg" as inspiration for his 2017 album Everybody, re-imagined in the interlude track "Waiting Room" and featuring Neil DeGrasse Tyson as God.

There are many short film adaptations of the story. Hjalmar Ekström Wikander, Tage Hervén, Walter Schönenbröcher, Fred Grant, Andrej Dojkic, Timothy Judd, Ben Brand, Gabrielle Salonga, Josef Orlandi and Nataliia Weaver have directed various such adaptations. Kurzgesagt also turned the story into an animated video.

== See also ==
- Advaita Vedanta – Hindu tradition of textual interpretation
- Amor fati – Latin phrase meaning 'love of fate'
- Cosmic egg – Common motif in mythology and cosmogony
- Egocentric presentism – Form of solipsism
- Eternal return – Concept of perpetual recurrence of time
- Hiranyagarbha – Golden womb or egg in Hindu cosmogony
- Metaphysical solipsism – Variety of philosophical idealism
- Nietzschean affirmation – Concept in Friedrich Nietzsche's philosophy
- One-electron universe – Postulate in particle physics
- Open individualism – Philosophical view that a single subject embodies all individuals
- Original position – Thought experiment in political philosophy
- "The Over-Soul" – 1841 essay by Ralph Waldo Emerson
- Panpsychism – Philosophical view that consiousness is a ubiquitous feature of reality
- Philosophy of Thomas Carlyle – Philosophy of 19th-century British thinker Thomas Carlyle
- Subjective idealism – Philosophy that only minds and ideas are real
