= Project Hail Mary (film) =

2026 film by Phil Lord and Christopher Miller

- Theatrical release poster
- Directed by: Phil Lord; Christopher Miller
- Screenplay by: Drew Goddard
- Based on: Project Hail Mary by Andy Weir
- Produced by: Amy Pascal; Ryan Gosling; Phil Lord; Christopher Miller; Aditya Sood; Rachel O'Connor; Andy Weir
- Starring: Ryan Gosling; Sandra Hüller; James Ortiz; Lionel Boyce
- Cinematography: Greig Fraser
- Edited by: Joel Negron
- Music by: Daniel Pemberton
- Production companies: Amazon MGM Studios; Lord Miller Productions; Pascal Pictures; Open Invite Entertainment; Waypoint Entertainment
- Distributed by: Amazon MGM Studios (Note: Released through the Metro-Goldwyn-Mayer banner) (United States and Canada); Sony Pictures Releasing International (International)
- Release dates: March 9, 2026 (Empire Leicester Square); March 20, 2026 (United States)
- Running time: 156 minutes
- Country: United States
- Language: English
- Budget: $248 million (gross); $200 million (net)
- Box office: $685.1 million

Project Hail Mary is a 2026 American science fiction film produced and directed by Phil Lord and Christopher Miller and written by Drew Goddard, based on the 2021 novel by Andy Weir. It stars Ryan Gosling, who also produced the film, as Ryland Grace, with Sandra Hüller, James Ortiz, and Lionel Boyce in supporting roles. The story follows Ryland Grace, a middle school teacher who awakens aboard an interstellar spacecraft with no memory of how he got there.

Pre-production began in 2020, before Weir's novel was published. Filming took place throughout 2024 in the United Kingdom, both on location and on sets. Scenes aboard the spacecraft Hail Mary were filmed on a practical set that was constructed for the film.

Project Hail Mary premiered in London on March 9, 2026, and was released in the United States by Amazon MGM Studios on March 20, with Sony Pictures Releasing International releasing in other territories. It received positive reviews and was a commercial success, grossing over $685 million worldwide and becoming the seventh-highest-grossing film of 2026.

== Plot ==
In the near future, middle school teacher and former molecular biologist Dr. Ryland Grace wakes from an induced coma aboard the interstellar spacecraft Hail Mary, suffering from amnesia. He learns that he is the sole survivor of a three-person crew travelling to the Tau Ceti system, 11.9 light-years from Earth.

In flashbacks, Grace recalls that scientists discovered a "Petrova line" of infrared light between the Sun and Venus. A dark substance in the line, dubbed "astrophage", was proliferating on the Sun, dimming it at a rate that would cause catastrophic global cooling within thirty years. Eva Stratt, head of the Petrova Taskforce, recruited Grace because of his expertise in speculative astrobiology. Grace discovered that astrophage samples consisted of unicellular organisms capable of absorbing electromagnetic radiation from the Sun and expelling it for propulsion.

Grace joined Stratt's Project Hail Mary, an international "long-shot" mission to send a crewed spacecraft to Tau Ceti, using astrophage as fuel. Tau Ceti was the only nearby star not occluded by astrophage. The mission was a suicide mission, as the spacecraft could carry only enough fuel for a one-way journey; any findings would have to be returned by space probes.

In the present, Grace encounters an alien spacecraft that docks with the Hail Mary. Made from a solid form of xenon, which Grace calls "xenonite", it carries a rock-like, five-legged alien from Erid, a planet in the 40 Eridani A system. Grace names the alien "Rocky", deduces that Eridians perceive their surroundings through echolocation, and develops a machine translation system to interpret Rocky's musical language. Rocky is a mechanical engineer, and the sole survivor of the Eridians' mission to save their own star from astrophage. Rocky and Grace agree to collaborate, and soon become close friends. As neither can survive the other's atmosphere, Rocky and Grace construct pressurized xenonite chambers inside the Hail Mary for Rocky to work in.

Grace and Rocky investigate the Petrova line around Tau Ceti e, which Grace names "Adrian" after the name he gave to Rocky's Eridian mate. (Note: Named after the eponymous main character's love interest from the film Rocky (1976)) They discover a microbial biosphere in the line; Rocky theorises that other organisms further down in Adrian's atmosphere keep the astrophage population in check. After learning that Grace cannot return home, Rocky offers to share some of his astrophage fuel with the Hail Mary. Grace then remembers that an astrophage explosion killed the original crew's science officers, and that Stratt recruited him when no replacements could be trained in time.

During a risky maneuver to collect the astrophage's predator, a fuel leak causes the Hail Mary to spin uncontrollably, knocking Grace unconscious. Rocky enters Grace's atmosphere to save him, but is badly injured. While Rocky recovers, Grace studies the captured predator, names it "taumoeba" (Note: Portmanteau of "Tau Ceti" and "amoeba") and selectively breeds it to survive in the nitrogen-rich atmosphere of Venus. After Rocky recovers, the pair celebrate their success. Grace then remembers that he initially refused to join the mission, but Stratt had him drugged and put aboard the ship, believing he was the only person capable of completing it.

Grace and Rocky part ways to return home. Soon afterwards, Grace discovers that the taumoeba has escaped its xenonite breeding tanks and begun consuming the Hail Mary's astrophage fuel. Although he contains the outbreak, he realises that Rocky's xenonite ship cannot contain the organism and will eventually lose all its fuel, stranding Rocky and dooming Erid. Grace chooses to sacrifice his remaining fuel to rescue Rocky and the Eridians, sending his video logs and taumoeba samples to Earth by probe.

Stratt and her team receive the probes, and use the taumoeba to cure the Sun's astrophage infection. On Erid, Grace lives in an Earth-like biodome built for him by the Eridians. Rocky tells him that Eridian scientists can prepare the Hail Mary for a return voyage to Earth. Grace considers this before beginning another day teaching science to enthusiastic Eridian children.

== Cast ==
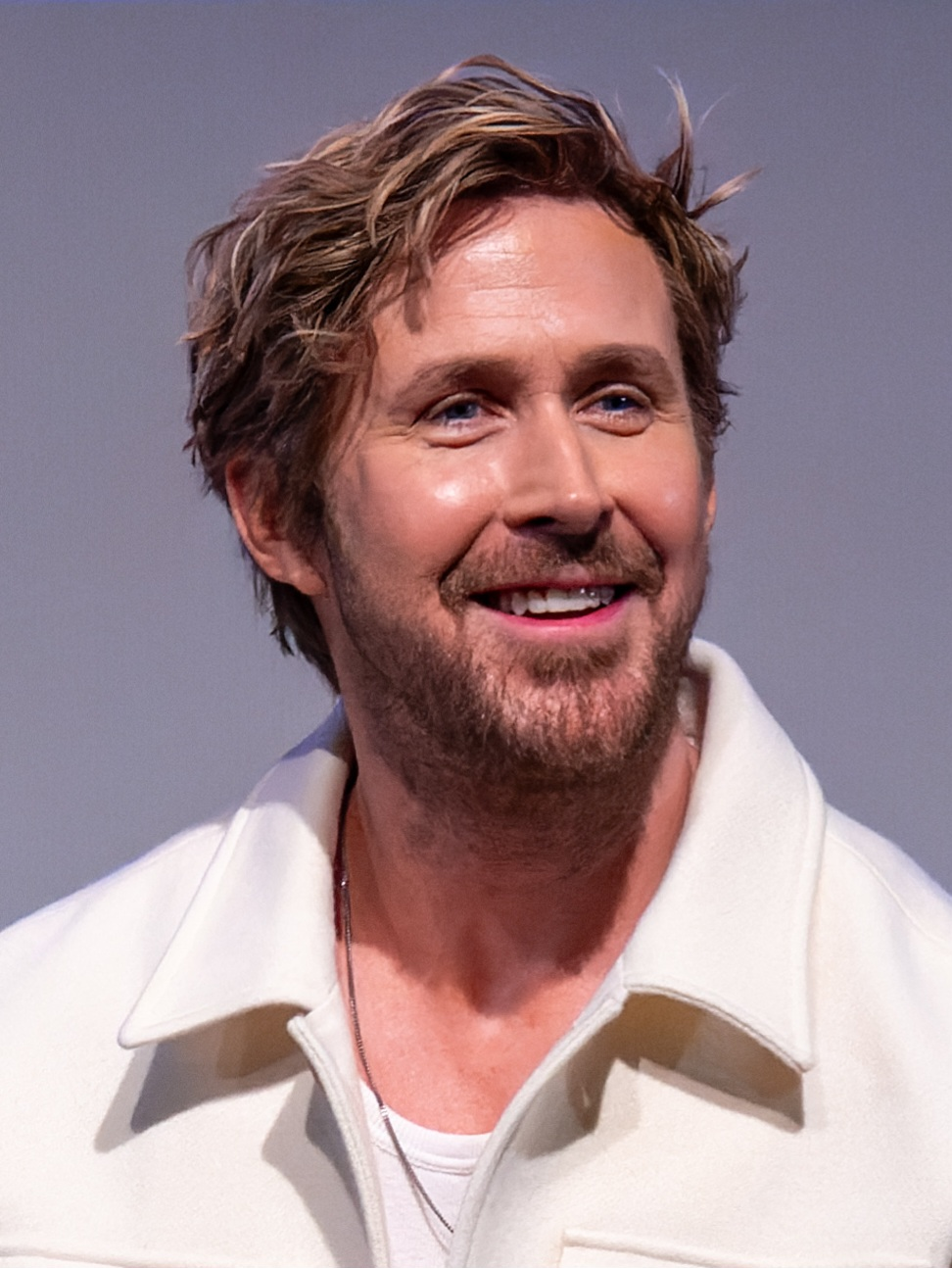
Ryan Gosling, who portrays Dr. Ryland Grace, also served as a producer on the film.

- Ryan Gosling as Ryland Grace, a middle school science teacher and former molecular biologist on a mission to save humanity
- Sandra Hüller as Eva Stratt, the head of the international task force behind Project Hail Mary
- James Ortiz as Rocky, an alien Grace encounters on his journey. The character was effected through a puppet controlled by a team of five puppeteers led by Ortiz, dubbed the "Rockyteers", with Ortiz also providing the artificial voice assigned to him
  - Ortiz also has an uncredited role as a television presenter
- Lionel Boyce as Carl, a member of security personnel
- Ken Leung as Yao Li-Jie, the Chinese commander of the Hail Mary spacecraft
- Milana Vayntrub as Olesya Ilyukhina, a Russian engineer on board the Hail Mary
- Priya Kansara as the voice of Mary, the Hail Mary's onboard computer
- Malachi Kirby as Martin Dubois, the original scientist of the Hail Mary
- Liz Kingsman as Annie Shapiro, a backup scientist of the Hail Mary
- Mia Soteriou as Dr. Browne
- Orion Lee as Dr. Li
- Michelle Greenidge as Chimamanda

Additionally, Eunice Huthart (the film's stunt coordinator), Damien de Froberville (co-president of Sony Pictures Animation), Ray Porter (the audiobook narrator), and Meryl Streep provided the rejected alternative voices for Rocky.

== Production ==
=== Development ===
In March 2020, Metro-Goldwyn-Mayer was nearing a deal to acquire adaptation rights to the then-upcoming Andy Weir novel Project Hail Mary (2021), with Ryan Gosling set to star in and produce the film. The rights for the novel were acquired for $3 million. In May 2020, Phil Lord and Christopher Miller were hired to direct and produce the film. Due to Lord and Miller being unable to work on the screenplay because of commitments to Spider-Man: Across the Spider-Verse (2023), Drew Goddard (who previously adapted Weir's 2011 novel The Martian into a 2015 film) was hired the following month to write the screenplay. In April 2024, Amazon, which acquired Metro-Goldwyn-Mayer in 2022, revealed a possible 2026 release window for the film. In May 2024, Sandra Hüller joined the cast, with Greig Fraser hired as cinematographer. Milana Vayntrub joined the cast the following month.

=== Filming ===
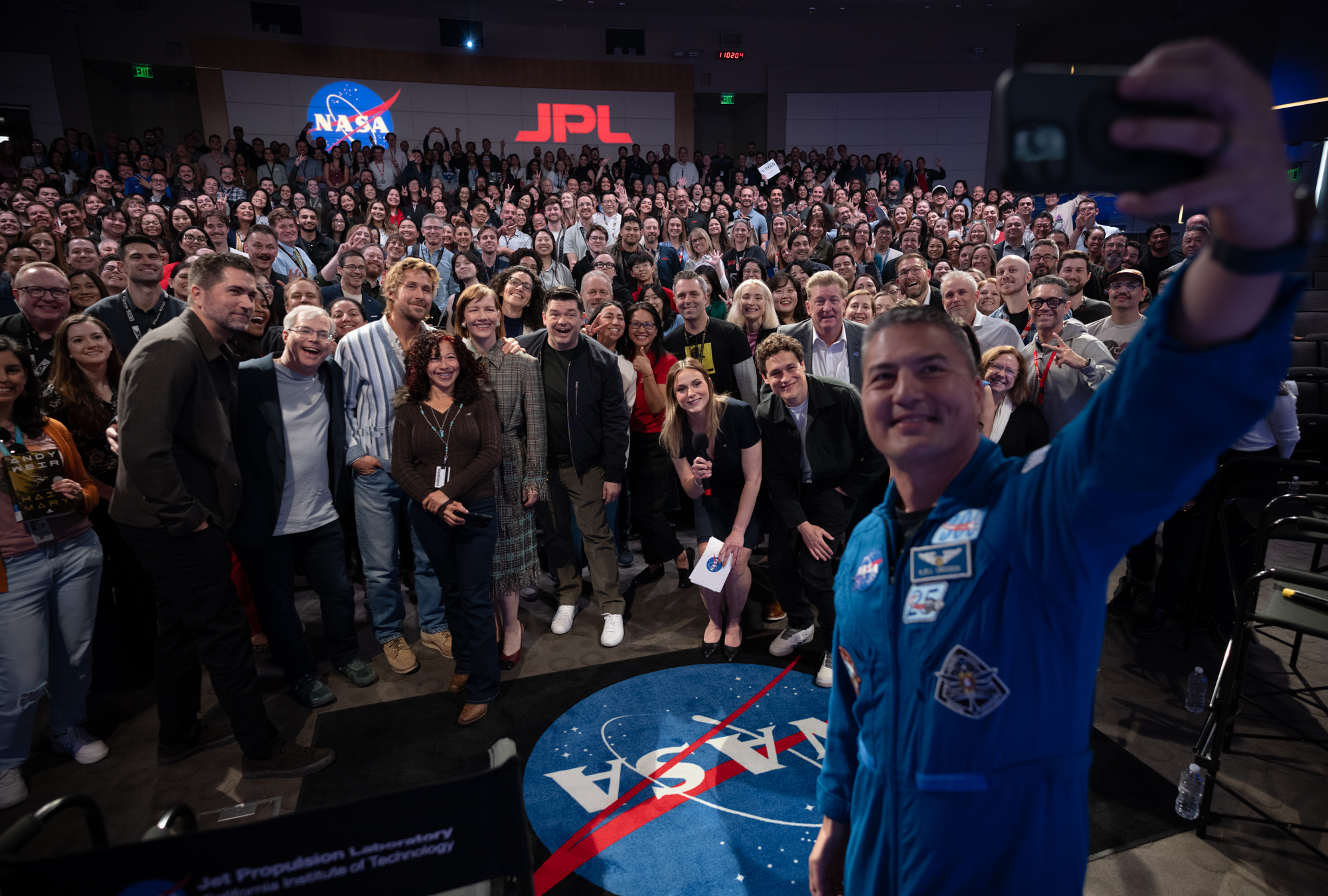
The film's crew, actors Ryan Gosling and Sandra Hüller, writer Drew Goddard, author/producer Andy Weir, and directors Phil Lord and Christopher Miller visiting NASA's Jet Propulsion Laboratory on February 25, 2026

Principal photography began on June 3, 2024, in the United Kingdom and wrapped on October 26, 2024. Filming took place at Shepperton Studios. Location filming occurred at The Hemel Hempstead School, the South Parade Pier in Portsmouth, the Mullard Radio Astronomy Observatory in Cambridge, and Durdle Door and Man o' War Cove in Dorset.

The film was "filmed for IMAX" by using large-sensor Arri Alexa 65 cameras, which provide 6.5K (20 MP) of resolution, with an aspect ratio of 2.1:1, utilizing the whole sensor with anamorphic lenses rotated by 90 degrees to achieve the IMAX standard 1.43:1 aspect ratio. For regular presentations, the common 2:1 format (Univisium) was derived by cropping the top and bottom of the IMAX image. The film switches between taller and wider aspect ratios. When a scene takes place in the present, a taller aspect ratio is used—1.43:1 for IMAX 15/70 mm or Dual Laser, 1.85:1 for Xenon or Single Laser, and 2.00:1 for non-IMAX presentations. For scenes in the past, an aspect ratio of 2.39:1, a standard ratio for anamorphic process cinematography, was achieved with the regular use of anamorphic lenses.

In an interview with The Hollywood Reporter, Miller mentioned that no chroma keying was used in the film, with the entire set being shot practically. Fraser had previously collaborated with visual effects supervisor Paul Lambert on the Dune films; their disdain for green and blue screens, which impacts lighting and visuals through color spill, led them to use blackouts and grey screens on the film instead. Miller had previously stated that VFX was used to depict the spaceship from the outside, while shots of Gosling in space were shot against a black or varying color backdrop.

NASA provided support through both the input of scientific experts and astronaut Kjell N. Lindgren visiting Gosling during filming to share insights on human spaceflight.

=== Post-production ===
The visual effects were developed by Framestore (which also collaborated on the film adaptation of The Martian), Industrial Light & Magic (ILM), Sony Pictures Imageworks, BUF and Wylie Co. VFX, with Mags Sarnowska serving as visual effects supervisor alongside Lambert.

While puppeteer Ortiz voiced Rocky during filming with Gosling, it was initially thought that a more high-profile actor would replace him. However, Lord and Miller felt that Ortiz's performance could not be improved upon during screenings of the film. Lord praised the collaboration between practical and visual effects in the creation of the character Rocky's performance:

Rocky was built and designed by the legendary Neal Scanlan and his creature shop and is performed by puppeteering legend James Ortiz and his team, who were on set with Ryan in every scene. Rocky's performance is a beautiful collaboration between James and the other Rockyteers on set and the wonderful animators at Framestore led by the funny soulful Arslan Elver.

Miller noted that by the end of the film, shots with Rocky were about 50% VFX animation and 50% puppetry.

The digitally shot and produced film was transferred to film stock and then re-digitized to achieve the "warmth" of analog film. The initial test screening of the film was 3 hours and 45 minutes long, and was cut down to the final length due to feedback from the screenings. Joel Negron served as film editor.

== Music ==
It was announced at San Diego Comic-Con that Daniel Pemberton would score the film. Pemberton worked with Lord and Miller on Spider-Man: Into the Spider-Verse (2018) and its 2023 sequel, which they produced. This is the first film directed by Lord and Miller to not be scored by Mark Mothersbaugh.

The score, consisting of 38 tracks, was released digitally on March 20, 2026. The film also includes fourteen other songs, including "Sign of the Times" by Harry Styles, "Two of Us" by the Beatles, "Rainbows" by Dennis Wilson and "Gracias a la vida" sung by Mercedes Sosa.

== Marketing ==
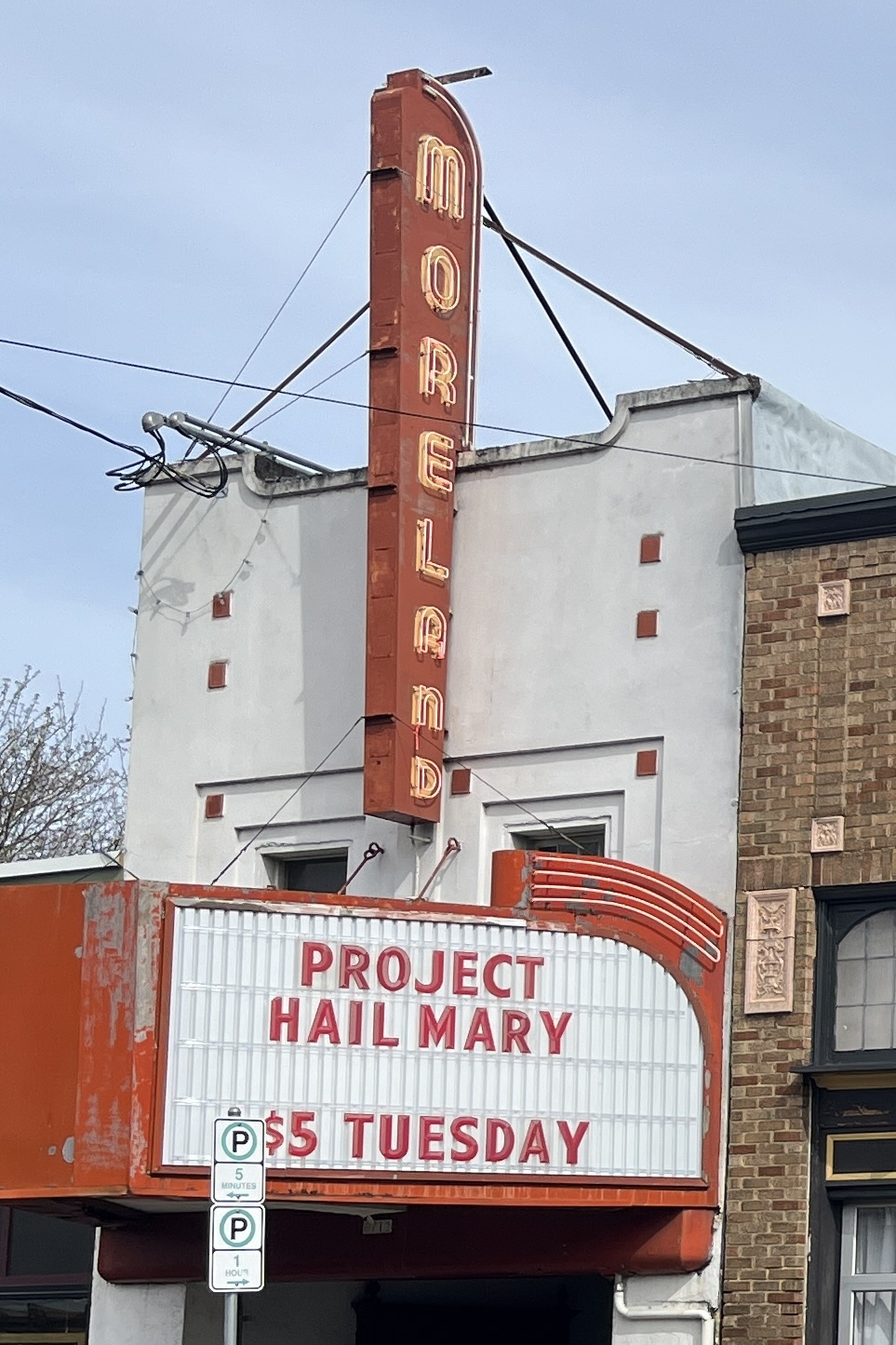
The film's title on the marquee of Moreland Theater in Portland, Oregon, in March 2026

The first trailer was released on June 30, 2025. It was the most-viewed trailer for any original film in the first week of its release, accumulating 400 million views globally. Lego released a model of the Hail Mary spacecraft on March 1, 2026, as part of the Lego Icons series.

== Release ==
=== Theatrical ===
Project Hail Mary was released on March 20, 2026, in over 4,000 theaters by Amazon MGM Studios in the United States and Canada, and Sony Pictures Releasing International in all other territories. It was also released in select IMAX theaters, with a 1.43:1 aspect ratio. (Note: Attributed to multiple references:) The film will be re-released in theaters on December 11, 2026, across multiple formats including IMAX and select 70mm locations.

=== Home media ===
The film was released on digital streaming platforms on May 12, 2026. It began streaming on the MGM+ subscription streaming service and Prime Video on June 18 and July 3, respectively.

It was also released on 4K Ultra HD Blu-ray, Blu-ray, and DVD on August 11, 2026, by Alliance Entertainment. Following the standard disc release will be an Amazon exclusive three-disc SteelBook gift set, scheduled for October 13. It will include a third disc with the film in its full 1.43:1 IMAX ratio, plus additional bonus material and a collectible booklet.

== Reception ==
=== Box office ===
As of September 11, 2026 Project Hail Mary has grossed $344.1 million in the United States and Canada, and $341 million in other territories, for a worldwide total of $685.1 million.

In the United States and Canada, Project Hail Mary was released on March 20, 2026, and was projected to gross $63–65 million in North America from 4,007 theaters in its opening weekend. Initially, publications estimated that the film would gross $45–55 million. After grossing $31 million on opening day, including $12 million in previews, the film debuted to $80.6 million in the United States and Canada, and $60.4 million overseas for a worldwide total of $141 million, becoming Amazon MGM Studios' biggest debut to date. In its second weekend, the film made $54.1 million (a drop of 32.8%), remaining in first. It was surpassed by The Super Mario Galaxy Movie in its third weekend, grossing $31.7 million. In Japan, the film became the highest-grossing foreign film of 2026 in terms of box office revenue attendance on its first day of release.

=== Critical response ===
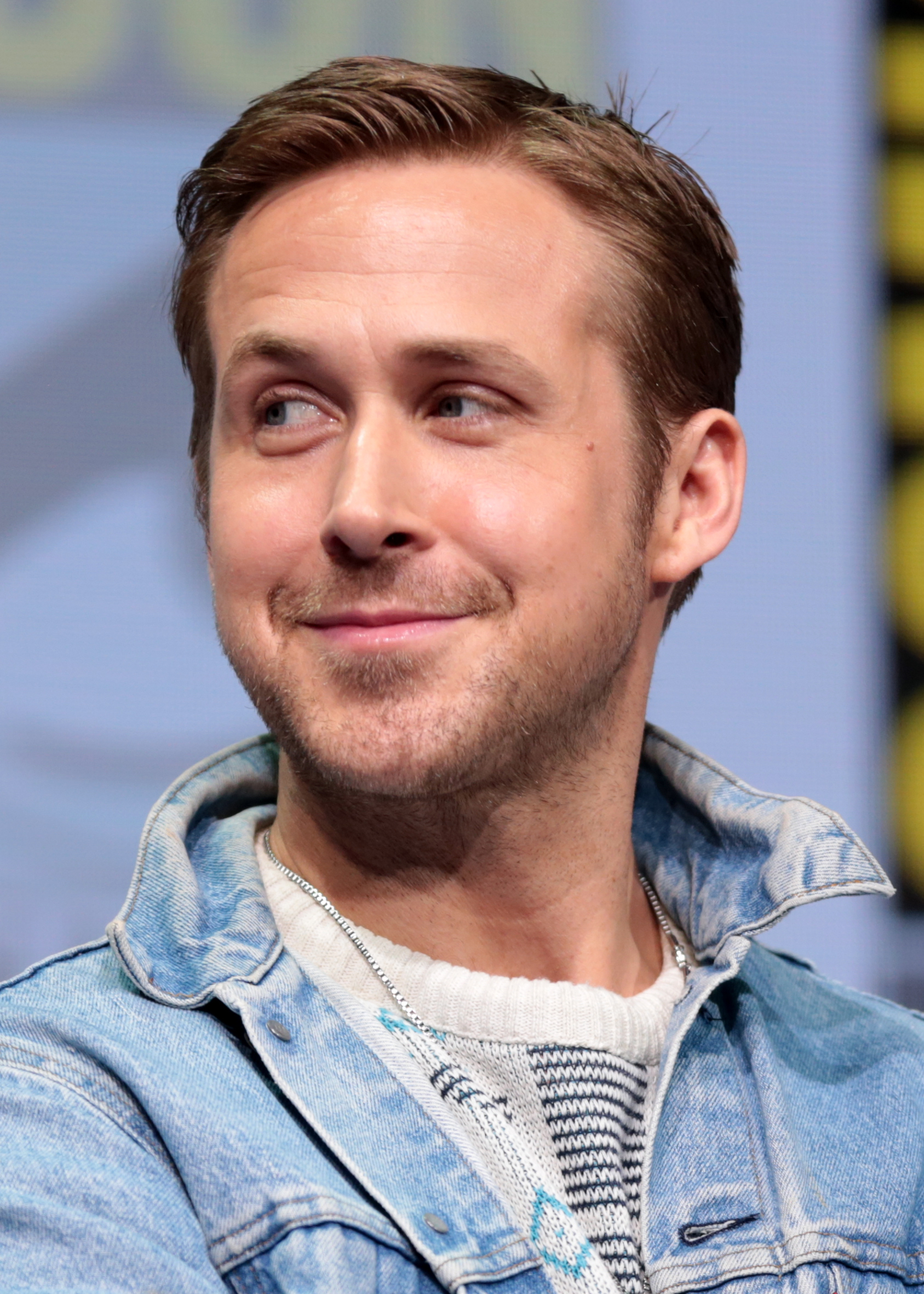
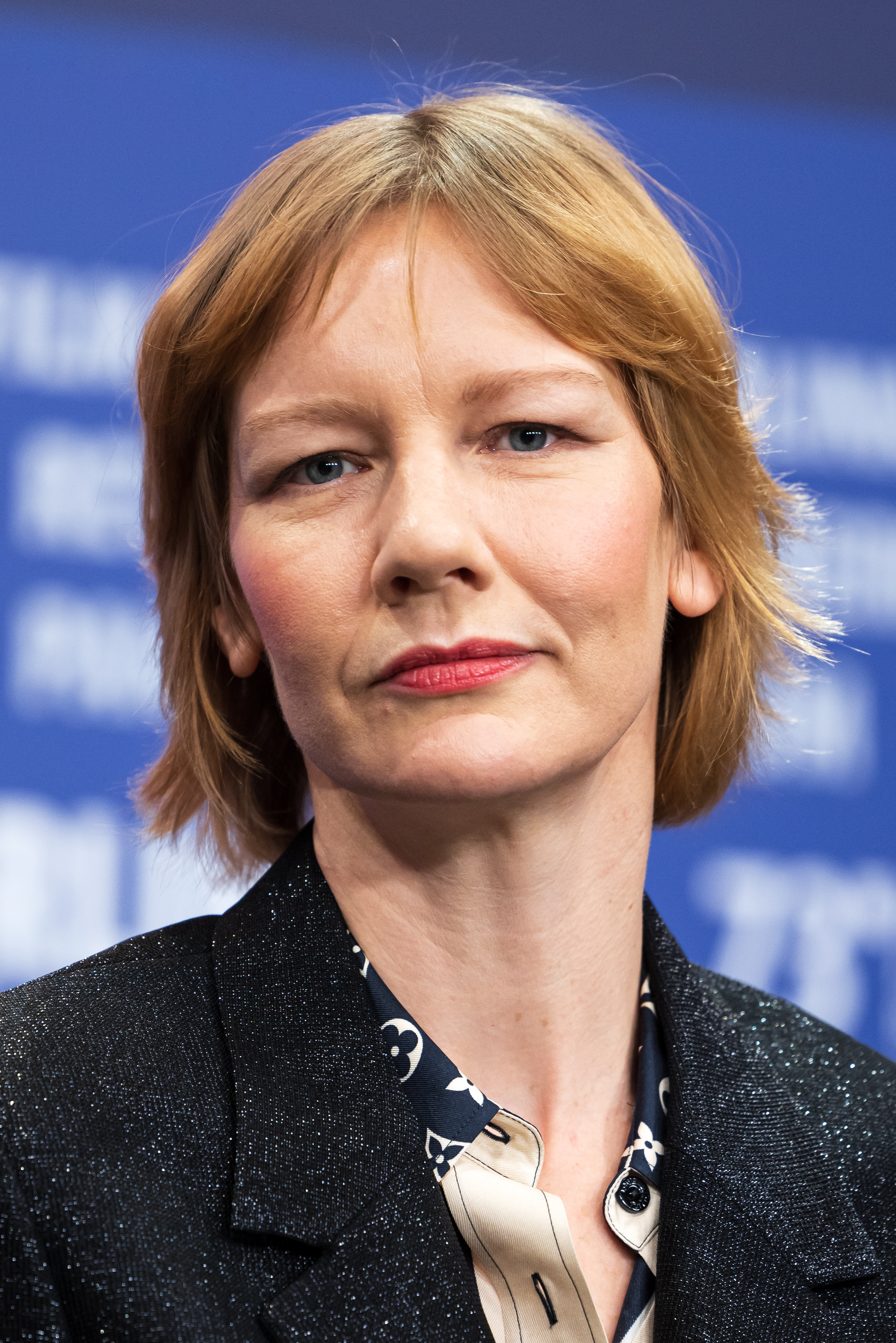
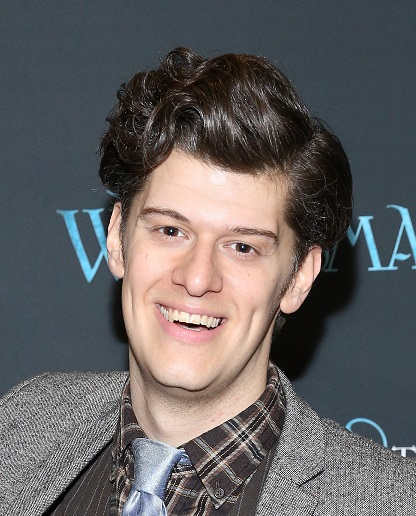
Critics praised the performances of Ryan Gosling, Sandra Hüller, and James Ortiz.

On the review aggregator website Rotten Tomatoes, 95% of 430 critics' reviews are positive, with an average rating of 8.2/10. The website's consensus reads: "A visually dazzling space odyssey that's carried along effortlessly by the gravitational pull of Ryan Gosling at his most winning, Project Hail Mary is a near-miraculous fusion of smarts and heart." Metacritic, which uses a weighted average, assigned the film a score of 77 out of 100, based on 60 critics, indicating "generally favorable" reviews. Audiences polled by CinemaScore gave the film an "A" on an A+ to F scale. The film received an average rating of 8 out of 10 from Cine21.

G. Allen Johnson of the San Francisco Chronicle deemed it "a masterpiece of a family popcorn movie, with eye-popping hand-crafted production design and outstanding creature design and puppetry work." Randy Myers of The Mercury News gave the film a 3.5/4 rating, writing: "While you can't help but marvel at the visuals and applaud the commitment of Gosling's endearing performance, what also makes Project Hail Mary so gosh darn lovable is that it imbues us with child-like wonder from scenes that pay homage to such classics as E.T., Flight of the Navigator and, yes, Rocky."

Cosplay of Ryland Grace with a fan-created Rocky prop at NärCon 2026

Robbie Collin of The Telegraph concluded in his review: "Does it have many original ideas of its own? Perhaps not. But its greatest hits mixtape of other people's has been compiled with such flair – as well as a sound comprehension of why they worked so well the first time – that it's hard not to be swept up regardless." Barry Hertz of The Globe and Mail shared a similar opinion, writing: "At almost every turn, Project Hail Mary attempts to convince you that it is groundbreaking, innovative filmmaking. But in actuality, the movie lands as a grand act of cinematic recycling – the fusing together of familiar, comforting bits and pieces into something determined to please crowds and warm hearts."

Amy Nicholson of the Los Angeles Times wrote: "While Stanley Kubrick's unsentimental 2001: A Space Odyssey inspired the iPad, Lord and Miller want to inspire a better version of us." Brian Truitt of USA Today gave the film a four out of four rating, writing that "Project Hail Mary is one of those old-school popcorn movies with big ideas, the kind of film that Steven Spielberg and George Lucas would have made back in the day and kids of all ages would have obsessed over and bought the toys." Ryan Cooper of The American Prospect wrote that the film portrayed a "shockingly realistic view of heroism" and was "one of the rare films that is quite a bit better than the book".

Peter Bradshaw of The Guardian wrote: "Gosling is an effortlessly charming screen player, and he keeps it watchable, though the film itself has moments of dullness and a sort of puppyish silliness [...] Perhaps refreshingly, the film doesn't aim for the stunned awe and rapture of, say, Christopher Nolan's Interstellar or even Jon Spaihts' underrated Passengers, but it does have the classic sci-fi spacecraft tropes: the huge, mysterious architecture with its vertiginous tunnels in which legacy pop music is played to soothe the inhabitants." GVSU anthropology professor Deana L. Weibel praised Grace's intellectual humility in the film.

Nicholas Barber of the BBC declared it one of the best films of 2026, writing:

Project Hail Mary is an unusual science-fiction blockbuster in that it's mostly about people using their brains to solve problems [...] Does that approach sound a bit dry and academic? If so, rest assured that Project Hail Mary is touching and inspiring – and surprisingly fun [...] it's directed by Phil Lord and Christopher Miller, who take a complicated, potentially bleak narrative and make it as fast-paced and cheerful as their animated hit The Lego Movie. Meanwhile, Ryan Gosling brings all of his goofball charm to the role of an amnesiac biologist who is trying to save the world.

Conversely, Owen Gleiberman of Variety called it "not a very good movie", adding that "it's baggy and incredibly derivative of movies you've seen before [...] More crucially, everything to do with the onboard alien is far too cute and formulaic".

=== Accolades ===
| Award | Date of ceremony | Category | Recipient(s) | Result | Ref. |
|---|---|---|---|---|---|
| Astra Midseason Movie Awards | June 30, 2026 | Best Picture | Project Hail Mary | Won | |
| Astra Midseason Movie Awards | June 30, 2026 | Best Director | Phil Lord and Christopher Miller | Won | |
| Astra Midseason Movie Awards | June 30, 2026 | Best Actor | Ryan Gosling | Runner-up | |
| Astra Midseason Movie Awards | June 30, 2026 | Best Supporting Actor | James Ortiz | Nominated | |
| Astra Midseason Movie Awards | June 30, 2026 | Best Supporting Actress | Sandra Hüller | Runner-up | |
| Astra Midseason Movie Awards | June 30, 2026 | Best Screenplay | Drew Goddard | Nominated | |
| Astra Midseason Movie Awards | June 30, 2026 | Best Stunts | Project Hail Mary | Nominated | |
| Celebración of Cinema & Television | October 2, 2026 | Innovator Award | James Ortiz | Honored | |
| Critics' Choice Super Awards | August 6, 2026 | Best Science Fiction/Fantasy Movie | Project Hail Mary | Won | |
| Critics' Choice Super Awards | August 6, 2026 | Best Actor in a Science Fiction/Fantasy Movie | Ryan Gosling | Won | |
| Critics' Choice Super Awards | August 6, 2026 | Best Actor in a Science Fiction/Fantasy Movie | James Ortiz | Nominated | |
| Critics' Choice Super Awards | August 6, 2026 | Best Actress in a Science Fiction/Fantasy Movie | Sandra Hüller | Nominated | |
| Dragon Awards | September 6, 2026 | Best Science Fiction or Fantasy Movie | Project Hail Mary | Won | |
| Golden Trailer Awards | May 28, 2026 | Best Action TrailerByte for a Feature Film | Digital Campaign (Amazon MGM Studios / Tiny Hero) | Won | |
| Golden Trailer Awards | May 28, 2026 | Best Drama | "Chance" (Amazon MGM Studios / Wild Card Creative Group) | Won | |
| Golden Trailer Awards | May 28, 2026 | Best Fantasy/Adventure | "Message" (Amazon MGM Studios / Buddha Jones) | Won | |
| Golden Trailer Awards | May 28, 2026 | Best Music | "Chance" (Amazon MGM Studios / Wild Card Creative Group) | Won | |
| Golden Trailer Awards | May 28, 2026 | Best Music | "Message" (Amazon MGM Studios / Buddha Jones) | Nominated | |
| Golden Trailer Awards | May 28, 2026 | Best of Show | "Chance" (Amazon MGM Studios / Wild Card Creative Group) | Won | |
| Golden Trailer Awards | May 28, 2026 | Best Sound Editing | "Message" (Amazon MGM Studios / Buddha Jones) | Nominated | |
| Gotham Independent Film Awards | November 30, 2026 | Audience Award | Phil Lord, Christopher Miller, Ryan Gosling, Phil Lord, Christopher Miller, Rachel O’Connor, Amy Pascal, Aditya Sood, Andy Weir | Pending | |
| Grammy Awards | February 7, 2027 | Best Score Soundtrack Album for Visual Media | Daniel Pemberton | Pending | |
| Hochi Film Awards | December 2026 | Best International Picture | Project Hail Mary | Pending | |
| Guild of Music Supervisors Awards | February 28, 2026 | Best Music Supervision in a Trailer (Film) | Vanessa Jorge Perry and Tyler Torrison ("Project Hail Mary – Official Trailer") | Nominated | |
| Hollywood Music in Media Awards | November 18, 2026 | Best Original Score – Sci-Fi/Fantasy Film | Daniel Pemberton | Won | |
| Middleburg Film Festival | October 18, 2026 | Distinguished Composer Award | Daniel Pemberton (Note: Also for Ink) | Honored | |
| Nickelodeon Kids' Choice Awards | November 14, 2026 | Favorite Movie Actor | Ryan Gosling | Nominated | |
| World Soundtrack Awards | October 10, 2026 | Film Composer of the Year | Daniel Pemberton (Note: Also for The Bad Guys 2 (2025), The Drama (2026), and Masters of the Universe (2026)) | Won | |
| World Soundtrack Awards | October 10, 2026 | Public Choice Award | Project Hail Mary – Daniel Pemberton | Nominated | |
