= Artemis (novel) =

2017 science fiction novel by Andy Weir

- Author: Andy Weir
- Audio read by: Rosario Dawson
- Cover artist: Will Staehle
- Language: English
- Genre: Science fiction
- Published: November 14, 2017 (Crown)
- Publication place: United States
- Media type: Print, e-book, audio
- Pages: 309
- Awards: 2018 Dragon Award for Best Science Fiction Novel; 2019 Geffen Award for Best Translated Science Fiction Book
- ISBN: 978-0553448122

Artemis is a 2017 science fiction novel by American writer Andy Weir. It takes place in the late 2080s in Artemis, the first and only city on the Moon. It follows the life of porter and smuggler Jasmine "Jazz" Bashara as she gets caught up in a conspiracy for control of the city. The book received mixed reviews from critics.

The audiobook edition (published by Amazon.com) is narrated by Rosario Dawson.

== Plot ==
On Artemis, the first city on the Moon, porter and part-time smuggler Jasmine "Jazz" Bashara is offered an opportunity by a regular client, wealthy businessman Trond Landvik, to assist him with a new business venture. While meeting with Trond, Jazz briefly encounters an associate of his named Jin Chu who attempts to conceal a case marked with the name "ZAFO". Trond intends to take over Sanchez Aluminum, which currently enjoys a lucrative permanent contract with the city for free energy in exchange for providing the city's entire oxygen supply as a by-product of aluminum production. Trond asks Jazz to sabotage the company's anorthite harvesters so he can step in with his own, and when he offers her a life-changing sum of money to carry out the criminal activity, Jazz accepts.

Jazz borrows some welding equipment from her estranged father, Ammar, and a small robot called a HIB ("hull-inspection bot") from a business associate of his. She visits the Apollo 11 landing site disguised as a tourist, leaving the HIB in place outside the airlock so that it can open the hatch for her without the assistance of a human EVA master. The next day, while an electronic device created by her scientist friend Martin Svoboda makes it seem as though she is in her living quarters, Jazz treks across the Moon's surface to where the harvesters are collecting ore. She successfully sabotages one, but is spotted by the camera of another. Jazz destroys two more, but flees to avoid capture by an approaching EVA team before she can disable the last harvester. With EVA masters guarding every airlock, Jazz is discovered by her former friend Dale Shapiro, whom she despises for stealing her boyfriend, Tyler.

Dale offers not to report her if she would put aside her resentment and try to rekindle their friendship, which she reluctantly agrees to. Finding Trond and his bodyguard murdered, Jazz looks for Jin Chu at an expensive hotel. She is attacked by Trond's assassin, but manages to escape with Jin's ZAFO case, which she gives to Svoboda to study. Jazz learns that Sanchez Aluminum is a front for O Palácio, Brazil's largest and most powerful organized crime syndicate, and that the killer, named Marcelo Alvarez, is now after her. Jin agrees to meet Jazz, but betrays her to Alvarez to save himself. Jazz, anticipating Jin's deception, executes the trap she set, incapacitating Alvarez and then turning him over to the city's de facto police chief, Rudy.

Svoboda discovers that ZAFO is a virtually lossless cable ("Zero Attenuation Fiber Optic"), which will allow long-distance transmission of data without the need for repeaters, revolutionizing communications infrastructure. As the manufacturing process requires low gravity, Artemis is an ideal location, and the new industry would significantly boost the city's stagnant economy. Jazz confronts the city's administrator Ngugi, who reveals she has been using Jazz as bait to flush out O Palácio's operatives, not wanting to allow Artemis to be seized by a crime syndicate. Jazz then enlists her reluctant friends and father to stop O Palácio by destroying Sanchez's smelter, which will allow Trond's daughter Lene, who inherited his fortune, to seize the pertinent contracts and rebuild. Dale helps Jazz break into the plant, where she sabotages the smelter to overheat and destroy itself, but in doing so, unwittingly creates deadly chloroform that is pumped into the city's air supply.

With under an hour before the unconscious residents of Artemis die from their exposure, Jazz races to access Trond's stockpile of untainted oxygen. She attempts to sacrifice herself to save the city, but Dale is able to save her. Lene pays Jazz for her services, and she finds herself temporarily wealthy. After buying her father a new welding workshop to replace the one she accidentally destroyed as a teenager, Jazz is called to Ngugi's office, where the administrator informs her of her impending deportation. Jazz convinces Ngugi of her value to the city as an "authorized" and harmless smuggler, whose monopoly on the illegal trade would keep out other, more dangerous criminals, as well as dangerous goods such as guns. Ngugi relents, but forces her to pay most of her remaining money to the city as a fine. Jazz and Dale rekindle their friendship. Jazz tasks Kelvin, her lifelong correspondent and smuggling partner on Earth, to discover which company Jin works for and invest in it before ZAFO and its earning potential is announced.

== Characters ==
- Jasmine "Jazz" Bashara – A citizen of Artemis who works as a delivery woman and also smuggles goods to survive in the expensive city
- Ammar Bashara – Jazz's father, who disapproves of her rebellion; he is a Muslim who works as a welder in Artemis
- Trond Landvik – A wealthy businessman from Norway, who lives with his 16-year-old daughter, Lene
- Lene Landvik – Trond's daughter, who was unable to walk on Earth after an accident, but can move on crutches in low lunar gravity
- Martin Svoboda – A Ukrainian scientist who works at the European Space Agency office in Artemis
- Rudy DuBois – the Canadian head of Artemis's security
- Dale Shapiro – A professor from the EVA guild, with whom Jazz has a grudge
- Bob Lewis – A former US Marine, now EVA guild coach
- Fidelis Ngugi – The city's founder and administrator
- Marcelo Álvarez – A Brazilian murderer who works for O Palácio
- Jin Chu – A partner of Trond Landvik from Hong Kong
- Loretta Sanchez – Owner of Sanchez Aluminum
- Kelvin Otieno – Jazz's pen pal from Kenya and smuggling partner

== Publication ==
Artemis was released on November 14, 2017, and debuted at No. 6 on the New York Times Best Seller list in December 2017. The book remained on the list for nine weeks, and peaked at No. 4.

Artemis debuted on the Los Angeles Times Bestseller List for Hardcover Fiction at No. 4 in December 2017, and peaked at No. 1 the following week. The novel stayed at that level for two weeks, and remained on the list for a total of nine weeks. Artemis also debuted on the Locus Magazine Bestsellers List for Hardcovers at No. 2 in February 2018, peaking at number 1 for one month in March and staying on the list for a total of four months.

== Film adaptation ==
In May 2017, 20th Century Fox (now 20th Century Studios) and New Regency acquired the film rights to the not-yet-published novel, with Simon Kinberg and Aditya Sood attached to produce. Phil Lord and Christopher Miller were announced as co-directors in September 2017. In July 2018, it was announced that Geneva Robertson-Dworet would write the screenplay. During promotion of Project Hail Mary, Lord and Miller revealed that they still plan to direct Artemis in the near future.

== Reviews ==
Writing for The New York Times, science fiction author N. K. Jemisin gave a mixed review, writing that the book "is a heist narrative at heart—but it lacks the core elements of modern heist narratives: no team of charming specialists, no surprise plot twists. That may be fine for 'hard' science fiction fans who prioritize idea over execution, or who simply crave well-researched technical speculation presented as fiction." In contrast, a reviewer for Salon called it "A sci-fi crowd pleaser made for the big screen."

Writing in Locus, Adrienne Martini was generally positive, praising the world-building and characterization, though finding the stakes of the plot a bit flat. Another Locus review, however, by Amy Goldschlager, found that the book didn't live up the expectations set by Weir's past novels, finding aspects of the plotting unrealistic and some "infodumps" contrived. Overall, she described the book as "a pleasant, if insufficiently convincing, little caper".

== Awards ==
Artemis won the 2018 Dragon Award for Best Science Fiction Novel and was a finalist for the 2018 Prometheus Award. Didi Hanoch's translation won the 2019 Geffen Award for best science fiction novel translated into Hebrew.

== See also ==
- Moon in fiction
- Colonization of the Moon
- Artemis, Greek goddess of the Moon
- Artemis program
