= David Morgan-Mar =

Australian scientist and writer

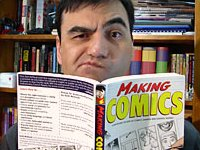
- Other name: Dangermouse
- Occupations: Author, designer, optical engineer
- Website: http://www.dangermouse.net/

David Morgan-Mar (also known as DangerMouse) is an Australian physicist, known for his webcomics and for creating several humorous esoteric programming languages. He is also the author of several GURPS roleplaying sourcebooks for Steve Jackson Games, as well as a regular contributor to Pyramid magazine.

Morgan-Mar is a PhD graduate from the University of Sydney, Australia, and has worked on camera, lens, and image processing projects at Canon.

== Comics ==
Morgan-Mar has produced, or been involved in producing several webcomics. These include Irregular Webcomic!, Infinity on 30 Credits a Day, Darths & Droids, Square Root of Minus Garfield, and mezzacotta.

=== Irregular Webcomic! ===
Irregular Webcomic! is a photo comic that consists mostly of photographs of Lego characters and sets with speech balloons added above them. The art also includes photographs of painted miniatures as well as of the author and background scenes. The strip has several (usually) distinct casts of characters (called "themes") with many different kinds of jokes and story arcs.

The comic started around the end of 2002. It ended late in 2011 with Morgan-Mar publishing assorted essays and musings on the site, but it resumed in April 2015 following a successful Patreon fundraiser. The strip has concluded with the final strip of the Stranger Things theme as of February 2025, and Morgan-Mar has stated he has no plans to create new comics for the foreseeable future. Daily reruns of past strips continue.

=== Infinity on 30 Credits a Day ===
Infinity on 30 Credits a Day is an idea that was developed by David Morgan-Mar in response to a poll he conducted, asking the fans of Irregular Webcomic! whether they would create a webcomic, given the ability to do so. It is a webcomic created entirely through collaboration between the 500 or so fans that signed up to help. Essentially, the creation of each comic was a collaborative effort by several people, chosen for their skills.

The comic started off with many contributions, but input tapered off during 2008.

=== Darths & Droids ===
Morgan-Mar helps to produce Darths & Droids as part of a group of eight friends known as the Comic Irregulars. Inspired by DM of the Rings, Darths & Droids follows players of a role-playing game that follows the Star Wars franchise, though takes place in a world where Star Wars itself was never created. Concepts from Star Wars, such as lightsabers' deflection abilities, midichlorians, the Gungan race and main characters are either made up by the players themselves or hastily invented by the Game Master after the players go off his prepared plot line. In a review, Fantasy Magazine said: "Aside from being a wonderfully fun send-up of the Star Wars movies themselves, Darths and Droids plays with conventions of tabletop gaming and makes loving fun of the basic player archetypes... If you aren't a fan of either Star Wars or Dungeons and Dragons, this isn't the comic for you. But anyone with that overlapping geekery should do themselves a favor and check this comic out."

== Esoteric programming ==
Morgan-Mar has created a number of esoteric programming languages, including Piet, Ook!, and Chef. He invented Piet, where the code is an image rather than text, as part of an esoteric programming language project. Chef produces code in the apparent form of recipes, and one user has produced a recipe that both functions as a program and as genuine baking instructions. Some of them are full Turing-complete languages while others are simple jokes, often based upon the idea of how a given group (e.g. chefs, orangutans, or necromancers) would be expected to program.

Morgan-Mar has also created esoteric algorithms, particularly sorting algorithms. His “intelligent sort” algorithm (a parody of intelligent design) which does no actual sorting, but simply suggests that any sufficiently complicated list is already sorted according to the whims of a sorter implying any further sorting is unnecessary, was referenced in the "Feedback" section of New Scientist. The Intelligent Design Sort algorithm just says that information must already be sorted according to the will of a great unknowable being, instead of actually sorting the information. Another algorithm, "LenPEG", is an image-compression algorithm that always reduces the standard test image Lenna to an output file of one byte, drastically outperforming the standard methods in benchmark tests.

== Writing ==
Morgan-Mar is also the author of several GURPS roleplaying sourcebooks for Steve Jackson Games, as well as a regular contributor to Pyramid magazine.

He helped to write the CiSRA Puzzle Competition, which ran from 2007 to 2013, and a successor, the Mezzacotta Puzzle Competition, which ran in 2016.

== Scientific work ==
Morgan-Mar was one of the inventors on the 2013 patent "Determining a depth map from images of a scene", and on the 2014 patent "Geometric parameter measurement of an imaging device". Morgan-Mar worked at Canon until 2019 when he was made redundant.
