= If I Were You (podcast) =

American advice podcast

- If I Were You's cover art
- Genre: Comedy; Advice
- Language: English

Cast and voices
- Hosted by: Jake Hurwitz; Amir Blumenfeld

Production
- Length: 30–65 minutes

Publication
- Original release: May 13, 2013 – April 24, 2023
- Provider: iTunes; SoundCloud (2013–2014, 2015–2017); PodcastOne (2014–2015); Spreaker (2015–2017); HeadGum (2015–2023); Art19 (2017–2023); Spotify (2017–2023)
- Updates: Weekly (Monday) with occasional bonus episode (Thursday)

Related
- Website: headgum.com/if-i-were-you

If I Were You is a comedy advice podcast created and hosted by American comedy duo Jake and Amir, known for their involvement with CollegeHumor and their web series also called Jake and Amir. First released on May 13, 2013, new episodes are posted every Monday (as well as occasional bonus Thursday episodes), featuring the duo's comedic advice for listeners who have submitted questions by email. The show ended after 589 episodes on April 24, 2023.

The show has appeared on the iTunes podcast charts in multiple countries, reaching number 3 in the United States.

== Content ==
Each episode of If I Were You usually begins and ends with a different theme tune created by a listener. The format of the show consists of hosts Jake Hurwitz and Amir Blumenfeld reading out questions—or, some episodes, playing audio questions—emailed to them by listeners with problems; usually three or four questions every episode. They assign the listener a pseudonym (often humorous or that of a popular fictional character) and discuss the problem, often brainstorming ideas and improvising humorous situations, before reaching and summarizing a conclusion of what the person should do.

The show has featured several guest stars, including CollegeHumor co-founder Ricky Van Veen, actors and comedians Ben Schwartz and Thomas Middleditch, actresses Allison Williams and Rose McIver, co-workers Streeter Seidell, Emily Axford, Sarah Schneider, Brian K. Murphy, Patrick Cassels, and Dan Gurewitch, The Pete Holmes Show host Pete Holmes, rappers Hoodie Allen and Lil Dicky, singer Alana Haim, Jake's mom Laura Hurwitz, and his brother Micah Hurwitz, all of whom were present for entire episodes, as well as cancer sufferer Ethan Trex and Amir's (at the time) girlfriend Laura, who were only in parts of an episode.

== Reception ==
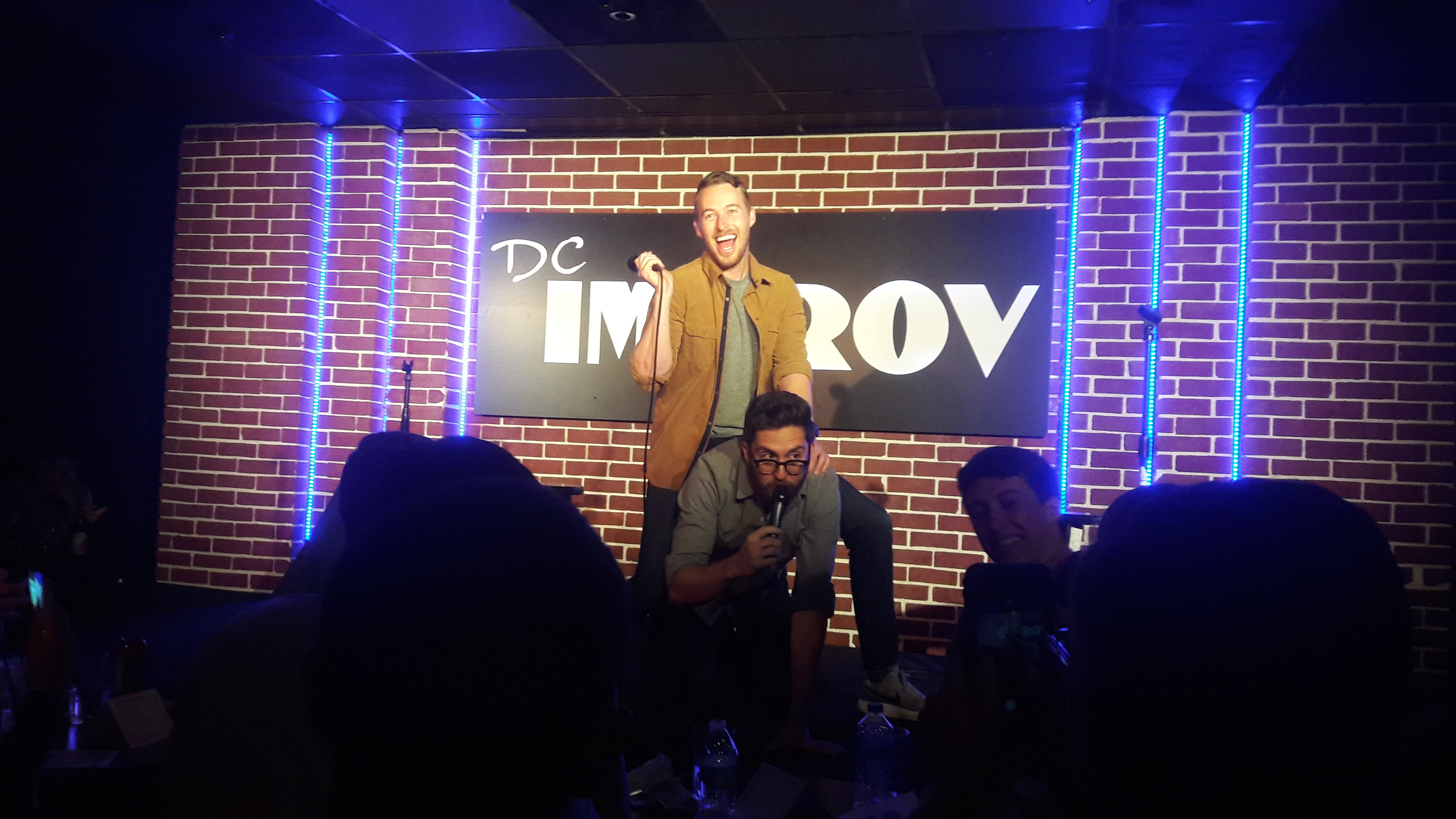
Jake and Amir goof off for the audience during a live recording of "If I Were You" at DC Improv, May 2017

The podcast reached number 1 on the British, Canadian and Australian iTunes charts, as well as peaking at number 3 in the United States and number 17 in Germany.

The Guardian's Miranda Sawyer called If I Were You "a typical example of a comedy podcast" and "amiable enough", but said it contained "far too much laughing", commenting that "If I wanted stream-of-consciousness waffle with the occasional funny line, I'd listen to [my small children]."

Sam Tabachnik of The Washington Post has written of the podcast that Jake and Amir "have their fingers firmly on the pulse of the digital comedy scene," and "riff off each other with ease," while The Concordian's Kayla Culver described it as "comfortable to listen to" and "genuinely funny," "like listening to two best friends having a hilarious conversation on the couch next to you."

== Episodes ==
Episodes were originally posted every Monday to SoundCloud and Tumblr, and then were posted on podcast website PodcastOne. As announced on Episode 146, IIWY show left PodcastOne and is now available on radio and podcast website, Spreaker. They are also available on iTunes. The second episode was posted early, on the Friday after the first episode.

No.	Title	Length	Original release date
1	"Starbucks"	0:30:26	May 13, 2013
2	"Bounce"	0:30:22	May 16, 2013
3	"Noodles"	0:30:35	May 20, 2013
4	"Cheeseburger"	0:29:54	May 27, 2013
5	"Seize the Cheese"	0:33:25	June 3, 2013
6	"Tattoos (with Ricky Van Veen)"	0:34:03	June 10, 2013
7	"YouTube"	0:35:52	June 17, 2013
8	"Tinder"	0:38:32	June 24, 2013
9	"Communism (with Streeter Seidell)"	0:37:19	July 1, 2013
10	"Grandma"	0:38:50	July 8, 2013
11	"Zero to D (with Allison Williams)"	0:40:51	July 15, 2013
12	"Kick Ass Dad"	0:29:24	July 22, 2013
13	"The Necklace"	0:36:26	July 29, 2013
14	"Sexting"	0:38:37	August 5, 2013
15	"Trust"	0:45:45	August 12, 2013
16	"Drunk"	0:42:58	August 19, 2013
17	"Batman vs. Porn"	0:37:51	August 26, 2013
18	"Snapchat"	0:42:24	September 2, 2013
19	"Roller Coaster of Love"	0:41:05	September 9, 2013
20	"Honesty"	0:44:16	September 12, 2013
21	"The Weiner Game"	0:42:47	September 16, 2013
22	"Threesome"	0:49:14	September 19, 2013
23	"Scientific Study"	0:43:29	September 23, 2013
24	"Braces"	0:51:00	September 26, 2013
25	"Waxing (with Emily Axford)"	0:48:52	September 30, 2013
26	"The Richest Man"	0:48:43	October 7, 2013
27	"The Easter Bunny"	0:50:07	October 10, 2013
28	"Sex Is Sex (with Pete Holmes, live at ComicCon)"	0:57:07	October 14, 2013
29	"Dicks And Nipples"	0:52:25	October 17, 2013
30	"Haehh! (with Patrick Cassels)"	0:53:34	October 21, 2013
31	"Texting Casanova"	0:51:38	October 24, 2013
32	"Jake's Mom (with Laura Hurwitz)"	0:53:59	October 28, 2013
33	"Tinder Talk"	0:54:56	October 31, 2013
34	"Dibs"	0:48:15	November 4, 2013
35	"Merkin (with Allison Williams)"	1:05:43	November 7, 2013
36	"Snail Trail (Live at Littlefield!)"	0:59:53	November 11, 2013
37	"The Friend Zone"	0:51:18	November 14, 2013
38	"Jealousy"	0:49:25	November 18, 2013
39	"Facebook Official (with Streeter Seidell)"	0:56:07	November 21, 2013
40	"Sugar Daddy"	0:50:57	November 25, 2013
41	"Aunt"	0:51:18	November 28, 2013
42	"Paranoid"	0:42:18	December 2, 2013
43	"Guys Suck"	0:46:59	December 5, 2013
44	"Awkward"	0:45:57	December 9, 2013
45	"Gotye"	0:47:24	December 12, 2013
46	"Christmas Gift"	0:41:40	December 16, 2013
47	"Cheating"	0:44:48	December 19, 2013
48	"Best of 2013"	0:53:20	December 23, 2013
49	"Jewish (with Micah Hurwitz)"	0:44:38	December 30, 2013
50	"Swinging"	0:46:16	January 6, 2014
51	"Stay Friends"	0:47:50	January 9, 2014
52	"Steroids (with Ben Schwartz)"	0:45:54	January 13, 2014
53	"Shot Through The Heart (with Ben Schwartz)"	0:46:01	January 16, 2014
54	"Rap Love"	0:46:58	January 20, 2014
55	"Wet Dream"	0:46:11	January 23, 2014
56	"Business Ideas"	0:42:55	January 27, 2014
57	"Confidence"	0:43:58	January 30, 2014
58	"Immune To Sex (Live At UCB Theatre in LA!)"	0:52:52	February 3, 2014
59	"Preach"	0:46:31	February 6, 2014
60	"Butthole (with Thomas Middleditch)"	0:59:51	February 10, 2014
61	"Polyamory (with Josh Ruben)"	0:48:09	February 13, 2014
62	"Phone Thief"	0:45:48	February 17, 2014
63	"Porn Browser"	0:40:50	February 24, 2014
64	"Cat Noises (with Rose McIver)"	0:57:56	February 27, 2014
65	"Nice Guys Finish Last"	0:44:11	March 3, 2014
66	"Hoodwinked (with Jeff Rosenberg And Rose McIver)"	0:47:15	March 6, 2014
67	"Howdy (with Dave Rosenberg)"	0:52:09	March 10, 2014
68	"Hemorrhoids"	0:49:55	March 17, 2014
69	"Mom"	0:42:02	March 24, 2014
70	"One Word Texts"	0:44:07	March 31, 2014
71	"Sim Cheating (with Thomas Middleditch)"	0:56:30	April 7, 2014
72	"Gifts"	0:48:07	April 14, 2014
73	"Horoscope"	0:40:17	April 21, 2014
74	"Ladies Night"	0:45:29	April 28, 2014
75	"Harry Potter (with David Rosenberg)"	0:45:52	May 5, 2014
76	"Bowl Cut (with Streeter Seidell)"	0:52:58	May 8, 2014
77	"Mother's Day/Butt Plugs"	0:49:52	May 12, 2014
78	"Steroids (with Rick Fox and Kyle Fox)"	0:51:28	May 19, 2014
79	"Persistence"	0:48:13	May 22, 2014
80	"Ultimatum"	0:41:35	May 26, 2014
81	"Hot Pizza"	0:44:05	June 2, 2014
82	"Baby Dick (Live at the Hollywood Improv!)"	0:57:30	June 9, 2014
83	"Meredith"	0:40:08	June 16, 2014
84	"Everybody Snoops (With Allison Williams!)"	1:04:18	June 19, 2014
85	"Homophobia"	0:42:11	June 23, 2014
86	"Instagram (with Hoodie Allen!)"	0:55:11	June 30, 2014
87	"Racist Opinions"	0:40:21	July 7, 2014
88	"Walmart (With Eliza Hurwitz!)"	0:44:59	July 10, 2014
89	"One Less Problem (With Ben Schwartz!)"	1:01:03	July 14, 2014
90	"Nipple Ring"	0:48:40	July 21, 2014
91	"Meddling"	0:45:03	July 28, 2014
92	"Cookies"	0:50:15	August 4, 2014
93	"Weird Name"	0:50:06	August 7, 2014
94	"Ex-Girlfriends"	0:53:44	August 11, 2014
95	"Minnesota"	0:48:21	August 14, 2014
96	"The Fly (With Sarah Schneider!)"	1:09:21	August 18, 2014
97	"Break Up"	0:51:45	August 21, 2014
98	"Underwear (with Thomas Middleditch)"	1:11:44	August 25, 2014
99	"Violence (with Brian Murphy)"	1:04:02	September 1, 2014
100	"Family Fiction (with Ben Schwartz and Thomas Middleditch!)"	0:54:53	September 8, 2014
101	"Bag of Poop (with Mike Schaubach)"	1:02:58	September 11, 2014
102	"Plane Crash"	0:47:13	September 15, 2014
103	"Psychic (Live from Manchester!)"	0:53:41	September 21, 2014
104	"Berlin"	0:52:26	September 24, 2014
105	"Vibrator (with Milana Vayntrub!)"	1:06:00	September 28, 2014
106	"Phone Case (live from L.A. Podfest!)"	0:56:14	October 1, 2014
107	"Farting (with Bobby Lee!)"	1:01:05	October 5, 2014
108	"Park Sex"	0:48:20	October 8, 2014
109	"Military Men"	0:48:26	October 12, 2014
110	"Lie Forever"	0:50:12	October 19, 2014
111	"Clam Dip (with Dave Rosenberg!)"	0:54:46	October 22, 2014
112	"TextJake.com"	0:49:17	October 27, 2014
113	"Bad Skin (with Jon Gabrus!)"	1:00:13	November 3, 2014
114	"Hickey (with Streeter Seidell!)"	0:51:15	November 10, 2014
115	"Groupies"	0:53:55	November 17, 2014
116	"Eat Your Heart Out (Live from the Hollywood Improv!)"	0:59:42	November 22, 2014
117	"Stomping"	0:52:13	December 1, 2014
118	"Stinky"	0:50:06	December 3, 2014
119	"The Wolf"	0:48:31	December 7, 2014
120	"Cucumber"	1:04:14	December 10, 2014
121	"Peach Fuzz (with Emily Axford!)"	0:59:03	December 14, 2014
122	"Gay Barber"	0:47:06	December 21, 2014
123	"Best of 2014"	0:50:47	December 29, 2014
124	"Racism"	0:52:44	January 5, 2015
125	"Get a Massage"	0:48:41	January 8, 2015
126	"Platonic Cuddling"	0:51:03	January 12, 2015
127	"Missing Dad (with Patrick Cassels!)"	1:00:58	January 15, 2015
128	"Herpes"	0:51:05	January 19, 2015
129	"Especially You"	0:52:58	January 21, 2015
130	"Sexual Training"	0:50:59	January 25, 2015
131	"#GreenlightJakeAndAmir"	0:53:47	January 28, 2015
132	"Taylor Swift (Live from Austin!)"	1:05:58	February 1, 2015
133	"Bro-Job"	0:53:18	February 5, 2015
134	"Toothbrush"	0:54:20	February 8, 2015
135	"Attraction (with Laura Hurwitz!)"	1:01:29	February 15, 2015
136	"Male Stripper"	1:00:36	February 22, 2015
137	"Shower Sex (w/ Lil Dicky!)"	1:10:27	March 1, 2015
138	"Sitcoms"	0:49:30	March 4, 2015
139	"Get Weird (w/George Basil!)"	1:01:14	March 8, 2015
140	"Australia"	0:49:21	March 11, 2015
141	"Chivalry (w/Ben Schwartz!)"	0:53:24	March 15, 2015
142	"Fake Sex (w/Ben Schwartz!)"	0:50:43	March 22, 2015
143	"Spelling Bee"	0:49:57	March 25, 2015
144	"Heart to Heart (w/Thomas Middleditch!)"	0:45:32	March 29, 2015
145	"Stage Kiss"	0:43:33	April 6, 2015
146	"End of an Era"	0:51:55	April 9, 2015
147	"Strangling (w/Jon Wolf!)"	1:01:05	April 13, 2015
148	"Master"	0:47:50	April 20, 2015
149	"Orgy (Live at Duke U!)"	1:00:31	April 23, 2015
150	"Prom"	0:49:09	April 27, 2015
151	"Spicy (w/Alana Haim!)"	1:01:25	May 4, 2015
152	"Litmus Test"	0:50:23	May 7, 2015
153	"Mint (live at the Improv!)"	0:56:04	May 11, 2015
154	"Truth or Dare"	0:48:44	May 18, 2015
155	"Carpets (w/Rose McIver!)"	1:03:34	May 25, 2015
156	"Raven Nest"	0:55:07	June 1, 2015
157	"Tile and Ring"	0:49:33	June 7, 2015
158	"Matt Damon"	0:48:08	June 15, 2015
159	"Best of Australia"	1:00:56	June 22, 2015
160	"Memory"	0:49:33	June 28, 2015
161	"Honor (w/Dan Gurewitch!)"	1:07:06	July 6, 2015
162	"Anti Drug"	0:54:06	July 13, 2015
163	"Ugly Hot"	0:52:28	July 20, 2015
164	"Stinky Pets"	0:53:52	July 27, 2015
165	"League (Live from Montreal!)"	0:59:44	July 30, 2015
166	"HeadGum"	0:58:43	August 3, 2015
167	"Secrets"	1:00:29	August 10, 2015
168	"Where's the Beef"	0:53:28	August 17, 2015
169	"Lightning Round"	0:59:21	August 20, 2015
170	"Hairy Butthole"	1:02:27	August 24, 2015
171	"Soulmate (w/Julia Nunes!)"	1:06:36	August 31, 2015
172	"Airplane Romance (/Jon Gabrus!)"	1:02:11	September 7, 2015
173	"Heroin"	0:57:24	September 10, 2015
174	"Romance"	0:53:50	September 14, 2015
175	"Moon Facts"	0:57:26	September 21, 2015
176	"Fantasy (w/Emily Gordon)"	1:00:55	September 28, 2015
177	"Cocaine (Live From Toronto!)"	0:54:51	October 5, 2015
178	"Divorce (w/UTK)"	1:04:58	October 12, 2015
179	"Hickey (w/Laura and Angela)"	0:58:18	October 19, 2015
180	"Baldness"	0:47:13	October 22, 2015
181	"Flying Bull (live at the Irvine Improv!)"	0:53:37	October 26, 2015
182	"Halloween"	0:50:08	November 2, 2015
183	"Filet-o-Fish (w/Billy Scafuri!)"	1:04:45	November 9, 2015
184	"Parental Love (w/Dannielle and Claire!)"	1:10:15	November 16, 2015
185	"Turtles and Honey"	0:59:24	November 23, 2015
186	"Polyamory (w/Elliott Morgan!)"	1:09:56	November 30, 2015
187	"Old Bully (live in Brooklyn!)"	0:57:16	December 7, 2015
188	"Red Dot (w/Jonathan, Jerah, and James III!)"	1:01:56	December 14, 2015
189	"Silver Lining"	0:58:17	December 20, 2015
190	"Best of 2015"	0:52:54	December 28, 2015
191	"The Emotionary (w/Eden Sher!)"	1:01:15	January 4, 2016
192	"Surge Dude"	1:00:05	January 11, 2016
193	"Game Boy"	1:02:27	January 18, 2016
194	"Get At It (w/iJustine!)"	0:49:04	January 22, 2016
195	"Caviar"	0:53:55	January 25, 2016
196	"Don't Do That"	0:55:06	February 1, 2016
197	"Mormon Mama (w/Laura Hurwitz!)"	1:05:29	February 4, 2016
198	"Peyton Manning"	1:00:13	February 8, 2016
199	"Homework (w/Brian Murphy!)"	0:50:13	February 11, 2016
200	"Yes Dude (w/Ben Schwartz!)"	1:04:30	February 15, 2016
201	"Search Terms (w/Shane Dawson!)"	0:55:12	February 22, 2016
202	"Mixed Signals"	0:47:27	February 25, 2016
203	"Thick Skin (w/Daren and Will!)"	1:15:57	February 29, 2016
204	"Sexy Gift"	0:50:37	March 7, 2016
205	"Special Announcement"	0:39:37	March 10, 2016
206	"Chex (Live in Austin w/ Ben Schwartz!)"	1:01:44	March 14, 2016
207	"Beehive"	0:59:03	March 21, 2016
208	"Nerd Cave (w/Caldwell and Nathan!)"	1:00:37	March 28, 2016
209	"Friend Group (w/Lauren Lapkus!)"	0:56:32	April 4, 2016
210	"Lonely and Horny"	0:51:52	April 7, 2016
211	"Phone vs. Wallet"	0:54:44	April 11, 2016
212	"Tampon (w/Ariana Madix!)"	0:56:23	April 18, 2016
213	"Lactose Intolerant"	1:07:45	April 25, 2016
214	"Sex Dream (w/Rahul Kohli!)"	1:00:43	May 4, 2016
215	"Prom Season"	0:56:25	May 9, 2016
216	"Cool Snack"	0:46:36	May 16, 2016
217	"Let's Go! (w/Hoodie Allen!)"	1:00:23	May 23, 2016
218	"Choking"	0:49:53	May 29, 2016
219	"Olive Oil (w/Billy and Adam!)"	0:53:37	June 6, 2016
220	"Peeing Outside"	1:04:56	June 13, 2016
221	"Video Games (w/Sam Reich!)"	1:00:13	June 20, 2016
222	"Baton (w/Bo Burnham!)"	1:04:09	June 27, 2016
223	"Sports (w/Mike Karnell!)"	0:53:37	July 4, 2016
224	"Role Play (Live in LA!)"	1:01:46	July 11, 2016
225	"Good Guy"	0:59:48	July 18, 2016
226	"Hot Tutor (w/Ramou Sarr!)"	0:56:07	July 25, 2016
227	"Pokemon Go (with Travis McElroy!)"	1:04:45	August 1, 2016
228	"Potato (live from Dublin w/Ben Schwartz!)"	1:21:08	August 8, 2016
229	"Trump"	0:44:23	August 15, 2016
230	"Pride"	0:49:23	August 22, 2016
231	"Prostitution"	0:52:03	August 29, 2016
232	"Bad Kiss (w/Arielle Vandenberg!)"	0:55:05	September 5, 2016
233	"Baby Names (w/Pat Cassels!)"	0:58:14	September 12, 2016
234	"Bar Mitzvah Kiss"	0:49:15	September 19, 2016
235	"Tobacco (w/George Basil!)"	0:58:41	September 26, 2016
236	"Bad Laugh (w/Grace Helbig!)"	1:05:58	October 3, 2016
237	"Motorcycle (Live in Toronto!)"	0:53:38	October 10, 2016
238	"Evolution"	0:44:47	October 17, 2016
239	"Cousins"	0:45:45	October 20, 2016
240	"Cavity (Live in Chicago!)"	0:57:02	October 24, 2016
241	"Cam Girls"	0:45:08	October 31, 2016
242	"Snoring"	0:55:24	November 7, 2016
243	"Morning After Trump"	0:39:00	November 9, 2016
244	"Female Condom"	0:43:08	November 10, 2016
245	"Weird Science (w/Dan Levy!)"	0:49:11	November 14, 2016
246	"Hot Bully"	0:55:35	November 21, 2016
247	"Unhinged"	0:51:51	November 28, 2016
248	"Facial (w/Mike Karnell!)"	0:59:51	December 5, 2016
249	"Snapchat (w/Gil Ozeri!)"	1:02:06	December 12, 2016
250	"Going Down (w/Jon Gabrus!)"	0:55:12	December 19, 2016
251	"Santa Clause"	0:47:09	December 26, 2016
252	"eTemple (w_Laura Hurwitz!)"	0:58:38	January 2, 2017
253	"Britney Spears"	0:55:19	January 9, 2017
254	"Topless Tuesday"	0:50:56	January 16, 2017
255	"Smile (w/Billy and Adam!)"	0:55:58	January 23, 2017
256	"Jew Trip"	0:50:09	January 30, 2017
257	"Netflix and Chill"	0:58:53	February 7, 2017
258	"Sex Farts"	0:50:07	February 13, 2017
259	"Secret Diary (w/Geoffrey James!)"	1:01:14	February 20, 2017
260	"Lightning Round"	0:45:20	February 27, 2017
261	"Daddy (w/Tim Baltz!)"	0:47:37	March 6, 2017
262	"Passwords (w/Eliot Glazer!)"	0:58:08	March 9, 2017
263	"Outdoor Sex (w/Rhett and Link!)"	0:45:58	March 13, 2017
264	"Seal the Deal"	0:46:41	March 20, 2017
265	"VR Porn (live in Melbourne!)"	0:58:54	March 27, 2017
266	"Danish"	0:46:25	March 30, 2017
267	"Nipple Hair (w/Hoodie Allen!)"	1:00:37	April 3, 2017
268	"Sex Diary"	0:50:35	April 6, 2017
269	"Mom on Blast"	0:51:17	April 10, 2017
270	"Nipples"	0:43:06	April 17, 2017
271	"Cam Girls"	0:43:06	April 24, 2017
272	"Return of the Game Boy"	0:48:56	May 1, 2017
273	"Shallow Boyfriend (Live in Denver!)"	0:53:51	May 8, 2017
274	"Butts and Butts"	0:44:02	May 15, 2017
275	"Hangover Routine"	0:44:55	May 22, 2017
276	"Sweet Boys"	0:46:10	May 29, 2017
277	"Instagram Girlfriend (w/Mike Karnell and Dave Rosenberg!)"	0:45:17	June 5, 2017
278	"Street Fighter Sex"	0:46:38	June 12, 2017
279	"Mona Lisa"	0:43:28	June 19, 2017
280	"Broken Wiener (live in Portland!)"	0:53:18	June 26, 2017
281	"Sex Party (w/Gaby and Allison!)"	1:05:10	July 3, 2017
282	"Is It Cheating If..."	0:45:54	July 10, 2017
283	"Prank Wars (w/Streeter Seidell!)"	0:51:50	July 17, 2017
284	"Jakes Moms Cookies"	0:42:14	July 24, 2017
285	"Sexiled Roommate (w/Gabrielle Elyse!)"	0:41:43	July 31, 2017
286	"Lightning Round 3 (w/Geoffrey James + Interns!)"	0:58:12	August 7, 2017
287	"Hypnosis (w/ Brian McElhaney & Nick Kocher AKA BriTANick!)"	0:50:21	August 14, 2017
288	"Butt Plug (Live in Montreal!)"	0:54:20	August 21, 2017
289	"Engaged"	0:45:10	August 28, 2017
290	"Worst Best Man"	0:44:49	September 4, 2017
291	"Porno Game Shows"	0:45:27	September 11, 2017
292	"Yoga Privates (w/Phil and Mike!)"	0:45:11	September 14, 2017
293	"Step Sibling Sex (w/Geoffrey James!)"	0:47:27	September 18, 2017
294	"Drunk Texting"	0:46:15	September 25, 2017
295	"Dog Lover (w/Hoodie Allen!)"	0:45:41	October 2, 2017
296	"F•R•I•E•N•D•S"	0:42:31	October 9, 2017
297	"Lightning Round 4 (w/Geoffrey James!)"	0:51:40	October 16, 2017
298	"Smoking Ferns (w/ Megan Batoon!)"	0:49:24	October 23, 2017
299	"Two Cats (w/Brian Murphy!)"	0:49:25	October 30, 2017
300	"A Celebration (w/Ben Schwartz!)"	1:00:35	November 6, 2017
301	"Baby Voice (w/Rob Huebel!)"	0:52:03	November 13, 2017
302	"Bachelor Party"	0:39:33	November 20, 2017
303	"Wild Goose Chase"	0:41:07	November 27, 2017
304	"Why Won't You Date Me (w/Nicole Byer!)"	0:47:23	December 4, 2017
305	"Masturbating on a Unicycle (w/Tim and Tom from Complete Guide to Everything!)"	0:46:20	December 11, 2017
306	"Dicklish Tick"	0:43:28	December 18, 2017
307	"Doodie Calles (w/Doug Mand and Jack Dolgen)"	0:46:38	December 25, 2017
308	"New Years Lightning Round!"	0:46:36	January 1, 2018
309	"Two Jakes (w/Jake Weisman!)"	0:49:46	January 8, 2018
310	"Unsolicited Advice"	0:43:40	January 15, 2018
311	"Hidden Dildos"	0:43:14	January 22, 2018
312	"Bad Voice"	0:49:38	January 29, 2018
313	"Poopgate (w/Hayley Marie Norman!)"	0:55:10	February 5, 2018
314	"Dungeons and Dragons (w/Murph and Emily!)"	0:51:06	February 12, 2018
315	"Wedding Planner"	0:43:13	February 19, 2018
316	"Brotherly Sex (w/Dave Rosenberg!)"	0:46:28	February 26, 2018
317	"Secret Honeymoon (w/Geoffrey and Davey!)"	0:47:59	March 5, 2018
318	"Is College Worth It? (with Miel and Demi!)"	0:49:08	March 12, 2018
319	"6-Way Kiss (Live in Austin!)"	0:38:14	March 15, 2018
320	"Prostitute Tips"	0:45:02	March 19, 2018
321	"Bad German Boy (w/Thomas Middleditch live in Calgary!)"	1:04:11	March 26, 2018
322	"Hall Pass (w/Billy Scafuri!)"	0:48:16	April 2, 2018
323	"Pee Sex (Live in NYC w/Scott Rogowsky!)"	0:44:48	April 9, 2018
324	"Sexy Flashlight (w/Doughboys Nick Wiger + Mike Mitchell!)"	0:51:21	April 16, 2018
325	"Jew Snacks and Life Hacks"	0:46:30	April 23, 2018
326	"Strip Clubs (w/Thomas Middleditch live in Vancouver!)"	0:56:29	April 26, 2018
327	"Ex Girlfriend's Birthday"	0:41:04	April 30, 2018
328	"Birthday Sex"	0:44:21	May 7, 2018
329	"Instagram Jealousy"	0:43:14	May 14, 2018
330	"Vaping (w/Sugar Pine 7!)"	0:48:12	May 21, 2018
331	"Ass Man (w/Thomas Middleditch!)"	1:16:21	May 24, 2018
332	"Jake's Lasik"	0:46:44	May 28, 2018
333	"Memory Lane (w/Ben Schwartz!)"	0:54:53	June 4, 2018
334	"Hot Roommate (w/Meg Batoon!)"	0:47:22	June 11, 2018
335	"Euro Trip Lightning Round"	0:53:23	June 18, 2018
336	"Spanking (Live in London!)"	0:45:41	June 25, 2018
337	"Small Problems"	0:38:59	July 2, 2018
338	"Class Clowns"	0:48:15	July 9, 2018
339	"Bald Spot (w/Murph and Emily!)"	0:45:40	July 16, 2018
340	"New Porn (w/Rose McIver!)"	0:47:41	July 23, 2018
341	"Wiping (w/Jay Mohr!)"	0:44:56	July 30, 2018
342	"Fanny Pack (w/Sean Jost!)"	0:45:41	August 6, 2018
343	"Tom Cruise"	0:48:12	August 13, 2018
344	"Favorite Flavors"	0:46:18	August 20, 2018
345	"Jake and Jill's Insane Wedding (w/Jillian Vogel!)"	0:59:39	August 27, 2018
346	"Dungeons and Dragons and Sex"	0:43:54	September 4, 2018
347	"Instagram Stories"	0:41:35	September 10, 2018
348	"Escape Room"	0:42:31	September 17, 2018
349	"Savor the Sausage"	0:41:04	September 24, 2018
350	"Dream Cheating (w/Yeardley Smith!)"	0:45:16	October 1, 2018
351	"Flaming Sock"	0:45:56	October 8, 2018
352	"The Biggest Announcement"	0:39:43	October 15, 2018
353	"Irish Pool Party (w/Sean Clements and Hayes Davenport!)"	1:02:50	October 22, 2018
354	"Hot Professor"	0:51:00	October 29, 2018
355	"Fear the Beard"	0:41:13	November 5, 2018
356	"Grammar Nazi (w/Lauren Lapkus and Jon Gabrus!)"	0:55:14	November 12, 2018
357	"Piece of Shit Car"	0:46:13	November 19, 2018
358	"Bro Job (w/Grace Helbig and Mamrie Hart!)"	0:51:24	November 26, 2018
359	"Bisexual Ex"	0:45:04	December 3, 2018
360	"Footjob"	0:45:24	December 10, 2018
361	"Wingmen (w/Jake Weisman and Matt Ingebretson)"	0:47:37	December 17, 2018
362	"Christmas Eve"	0:43:36	December 24, 2018
363	"New Years Eve"	0:48:04	December 31, 2018
364	"Magic The Gathering"	0:50:55	January 7, 2019
365	"Secrets Secrets"	0:43:18	January 14, 2019
366	"Unsolicited Advice (w/Jon Gabrus!)"	1:29:02	January 21, 2019
367	"Nephew's Haircut"	0:50:41	January 28, 2019
368	"Small Spoon (w/Geoffrey James)"	0:48:09	February 4, 2019
369	"Long Underwear"	0:44:32	February 11, 2019
370	"Meth Boyfriend"	0:43:15	February 18, 2019
371	"Power Move"	0:48:08	February 25, 2019
372	"Blanket Poop (w/Nicole Byer!)"	0:53:15	March 4, 2019
373	"Girls on Porn (w/Laura and Rachel!)"	0:54:00	March 11, 2019
374	"Pee Tasting (live in NYC!)"	0:50:17	March 18, 2019
375	"Home Schooled (w/Kevin Porter!)"	0:44:44	March 25, 2019
376	"Skinny Condom"	0:46:16	April 1, 2019
377	"Shart and Dart (Live in DC!)"	0:47:49	April 8, 2019
378	"Sing Along"	0:47:55	April 15, 2019
379	"Golden Mic"	0:52:15	April 22, 2019
380	"The Psychopath"	0:46:01	April 29, 2019
381	"Game of Thrones"	0:48:30	May 6, 2019
382	"Game Night (w/Hey Riddle Riddle!)"	0:56:19	May 13, 2019
383	"Ticklish Vagina"	0:41:39	May 20, 2019
384	"The Roommate Switch"	0:48:45	May 27, 2019
385	"To Doink or Not to Doink"	0:49:44	June 3, 2019
386	"Circumcision (w/Nic Rad!)"	0:46:07	June 10, 2019
387	"Prison (w/Middleditch and Schwartz!)"	1:14:59	June 17, 2019
388	"Drake's Wallet"	0:41:13	June 24, 2019
389	"Sexile Island"	0:42:11	July 1, 2019
390	"Shout Out Lightning Round"	0:41:27	July 8, 2019
391	"Tongue in Cheek Kiss"	0:43:45	July 15, 2019
392	"Blind Date (w/Julia Nunes!)"	0:54:26	July 22, 2019
393	"Running Late"	0:43:14	July 29, 2019
394	"Jake's Birthday Barty"	0:43:03	August 5, 2019
395	"Panic Attack"	0:43:15	August 12, 2019
396	"Ice Cream Girl"	0:41:40	August 19, 2019
397	"Cryotherapy"	0:41:23	August 26, 2019
398	"Alaskan Adventure"	0:48:03	September 2, 2019
399	"Singing and Acting"	0:43:43	September 9, 2019
400	"Memory Lane"	0:44:23	September 16, 2019
401	"The Godfather"	0:46:48	September 23, 2019
402	"Duck Butter"	0:46:44	September 30, 2019
403	"Ass Shot"	0:45:37	October 7, 2019
404	"Soup to Nuts (Lightning Round)"	0:48:28	October 14, 2019
405	"Dungeons and Dragons and Sex"	0:41:05	October 21, 2019
406	"Better Late Than Never"	0:47:59	October 30, 2019
407	"The Best Coffee"	0:45:30	November 4, 2019
408	"Cool Scar"	0:41:04	November 11, 2019
409	"Secret Santa (w/Thomas Middleditch!)"	0:51:22	November 18, 2019
410	"Airdrop Flirting"	0:39:00	November 25, 2019
411	"Sick Lightning Round"	0:53:13	December 3, 2019
412	"Pissing in a Sink"	0:39:02	December 9, 2019
413	"Christmas Tree"	0:44:31	December 16, 2019
414	"Amir on NADDPod"	1:47:05	December 23, 2019
415	"Hosting and Ghosting"	0:46:48	December 30, 2019
416	"Foot For Thought"	0:47:56	January 7, 2020
417	"Hostel Love"	0:45:10	January 13, 2020
418	"Addiction"	0:41:28	January 20, 2020
419	"Stinky Penis"	0:44:11	January 27, 2020
420	"Road Hand (w/Ana Nicolich!)"	0:47:12	February 3, 2020
421	"Thick Chicken (w/Geoff and Reilly!)"	0:55:30	February 10, 2020
422	"Worms (w/Rose McIver!)"	0:43:55	February 17, 2020
423	"Motion Sickness"	0:42:07	February 24, 2020
424	"Dead Eyes (w/Connor Ratliff!)"	0:38:38	March 2, 2020
425	"CoronaVirus"	0:40:45	March 9, 2020
426	"Corona Calls (w/Geoff, Marty, & Ben Schwartz!)"	1:01:25	March 16, 2020
427	"Quarantine Chat"	0:44:16	March 23, 2020
428	"Masks and Bananas (w/Jeff and Pat!)"	0:48:36	March 30, 2020
429	"Quar-and-A Lightning Round"	0:45:18	April 7, 2020
430	"Dance Party"	0:46:22	April 13, 2020
431	"Scam Girls"	0:42:39	April 20, 2020
432	"Suck My Stamp"	0:40:47	April 27, 2020
433	"Zoom Flash"	0:45:03	May 4, 2020
434	"Animal Crossing"	0:48:50	May 11, 2020
435	"The Mailman"	0:46:03	May 18, 2020
436	"Brotherly Love"	0:45:31	May 25, 2020
437	"Black Lives Matter"	0:36:04	June 1, 2020
438	"Protesting"	0:41:13	June 8, 2020
439	"Song Titles"	0:45:53	June 15, 2020
440	"Sugar Father"	0:42:31	June 22, 2020
441	"Streamin' and Dreamin'"	0:48:41	June 29, 2020
442	"Liquid Courage"	0:42:24	July 6, 2020
443	"I THINK (w/Ben Schwartz!)"	0:46:26	July 13, 2020
444	"Robe Lightning Round"	0:49:08	July 20, 2020
445	"Only Fans"	0:42:06	July 27, 2020
446	"Jake's Birthday Gift"	0:46:53	August 3, 2020
447	"Roommate Switch"	0:47:13	August 10, 2020
448	"Tourist Season (w/Miel!)"	0:49:02	August 17, 2020
449	"Geoff and Reilly Lightning Round"	0:53:03	August 24, 2020
450	"Reality TV (w/Karen Chee!)"	0:56:33	August 31, 2020
451	"Off the Grid"	0:50:27	September 8, 2020
452	"Hawaii Time"	0:49:34	September 14, 2020
453	"Telling Time (w/Finn Wolfhard and Billy Bryk!)"	0:47:24	September 21, 2020
454	"Naked Neighbors (w/Hey Riddle Riddle!)"	1:05:15	September 28, 2020
455	"Rubik's Cube"	0:51:26	October 5, 2020
456	"VOTE"	0:48:10	October 8, 2020
457	"Eames Toilet (w/Geoffrey James!)"	0:54:10	October 12, 2020
458	"Flight Attendant"	0:48:47	October 19, 2020
459	"Night Terrors"	0:44:40	October 26, 2020
460	"Morning Before Election"	0:46:53	November 2, 2020
461	"Morning After JOE"	0:51:24	November 10, 2020
462	"Screen Time"	0:53:16	November 16, 2020
463	"Ticklish"	0:51:14	November 23, 2020
464	"Rat Car"	0:50:44	November 30, 2020
465	"Physical Therapy (w/ Mystery Guest!)"	0:47:21	December 7, 2020
466	"Dreidel, Dreidel, Dreidel"	0:53:21	December 14, 2020
467	"Staying Warm"	0:57:59	December 21, 2020
468	"Liquid Nice"	0:52:39	December 28, 2020
469	"Happy New Year"	0:51:15	January 4, 2021
470	"Sex in the Dark (w/Caleb Hearon and Shelby Wolstein!)"	1:00:58	January 11, 2021
471	"Chef Jake"	0:55:46	January 18, 2021
472	"Valentines Day Gift"	0:52:05	January 25, 2021
473	"Fish and Chippendales"	1:02:27	February 1, 2021
474	"Another Super Bowl Bet"	0:52:02	February 8, 2021
475	"Growth Spurt"	0:59:04	February 15, 2021
476	"Pokémon Cards"	1:05:50	February 22, 2021
477	"Live Show Lightning Round"	1:06:31	March 1, 2021
478	"Exes in Texas (w/Kelcey Ayer!)"	1:06:41	March 8, 2021
479	"Scare Me (w/Josh Ruben!)"	1:00:32	March 15, 2021
480	"Erotic Fiction"	1:04:15	March 22, 2021
481	"Moonshine Passover"	1:00:54	March 29, 2021
482	"Easy Poetry"	1:02:12	April 5, 2021
483	"Orion Dating App"	1:02:35	April 12, 2021
484	"Antisocial Distance (w/Avital Ash!)"	1:08:44	April 19, 2021
485	"Road Trip"	1:10:09	April 26, 2021
486	"Horse's Ass (w/Jasper William Cartwright!)"	1:15:30	May 3, 2021
487	"Naptime"	0:55:05	May 10, 2021
488	"Playstation"	1:02:17	May 17, 2021
489	"Cereal Mascots"	1:06:27	May 24, 2021
490	"Game Night"	1:02:27	May 31, 2021
491	"The Pearl Thief"	1:00:23	June 7, 2021
492	"Misunderstood"	1:07:09	June 14, 2021
493	"Cuddle vs. Huddle"	0:58:22	June 21, 2021
494	"Accent Coach"	1:02:26	June 28, 2021
495	"Too Many Dates"	0:55:41	July 5, 2021
496	"Impressions"	0:58:45	July 12, 2021
497	"LA Trip"	1:01:01	July 19, 2021
498	"iCarly (w/Max & Ivan!)"	0:54:07	July 26, 2021
499	"Olympics"	0:47:20	August 2, 2021
500	"Memory Lane"	0:55:12	August 9, 2021
501	"Ya Boy!"	0:50:12	August 16, 2021
502	"Worst Pizza Ever"	0:54:18	August 23, 2021
503	"The Greatest Height"	0:59:05	August 30, 2021
504	"First Date (w/Avital Ash!)"	0:55:21	September 6, 2021
505	"Bad Haircut"	0:58:16	September 13, 2021
506	"Toilet Porn"	0:52:40	September 20, 2021
507	"Candles (w/Geoffrey James!)"	1:10:22	September 27, 2021
508	"A Good Cry (w/Michael Cruz Kayne)"	1:02:48	October 4, 2021
509	"Alarm Clock"	0:53:08	October 11, 2021
510	"Jake and Amir Lightning Round"	1:00:58	October 18, 2021
511	"Shmuel's Rules"	0:52:56	October 25, 2021
512	"Be Clear"	0:59:48	November 1, 2021
513	"Gym Flirting (w/The Dumbbells!)"	1:08:40	November 8, 2021
514	"Breakfast Smoothie (w/Negin Farsad!)"	1:02:13	November 15, 2021
515	"Gulp"	0:55:28	November 22, 2021
516	"Thanksgiving Lightning Round"	1:11:34	November 29, 2021
517	"Christmas Tree"	0:56:19	December 6, 2021
518	"Succession"	0:47:50	December 13, 2021
519	"Follow Up Pups"	0:56:52	December 20, 2021
520	"Ex-Mas"	0:50:51	December 27, 2021
521	"New Year"	0:57:04	January 3, 2022
522	"Bike Riding"	0:53:21	January 10, 2022
523	"Wisdom Teeth"	0:55:17	January 17, 2022
524	"I Like Wordle"	0:54:05	January 24, 2022
525	"Mic of Gold"	0:51:58	January 31, 2022
526	"Crawfish Boil"	0:53:13	February 7, 2022
527	"Bad Hair"	0:51:57	February 14, 2022
528	"Failed Projects"	0:56:38	February 21, 2022
529	"Daily Banana"	1:01:23	February 28, 2022
530	"Roommate Problems"	0:51:23	March 7, 2022
531	"Cool Professor (w/Evan and Andrew Gregory!)"	0:55:19	March 14, 2022
532	"Playing Hooky"	0:54:52	March 21, 2022
533	"Songs"	0:58:40	March 28, 2022
534	"Chase Bieber"	0:57:57	April 4, 2022
535	"Baby Names"	0:49:22	April 11, 2022
536	"Private Chef"	0:49:23	April 18, 2022
537	"Ballad Of Hurwitz And Blumenfeld"	0:53:02	April 25, 2022
538	"Chess Lessons"	0:54:16	May 2, 2022
539	"Slapping"	0:48:10	May 9, 2022
540	"Nostalgia"	0:47:55	May 16, 2022
541	"Porn Ultimatum"	0:53:45	May 23, 2022
542	"Tiny Dab"	1:01:47	May 30, 2022
543	"Parking Ticket"	0:49:36	June 6, 2022
544	"Summer Lightning Round"	1:01:39	June 13, 2022
545	"WHIMSY (w/Geoffrey James!)"	1:00:37	June 20, 2022
546	"TV Dinner"	0:46:01	June 27, 2022
547	"Walmart, Texas"	0:48:41	July 4, 2022
548	"Fate on Shuffle"	1:00:36	July 11, 2022
549	"Dueling Vacations"	0:55:35	July 18, 2022
550	"Amber Alert"	0:42:42	July 25, 2022
551	"God Mode"	0:45:20	August 1, 2022
552	"Corked (w/Josh Ruben!)"	0:56:23	August 8, 2022
553	"Naval Massage (w/Chris Redd!)"	1:05:33	August 15, 2022
554	"Wisdom"	0:54:15	August 22, 2022
555	"Egg Tweet"	0:50:42	August 29, 2022
556	"So Random (w/Emily and Sammy!)"	0:44:55	September 5, 2022
557	"Swashbuckler"	0:45:48	September 12, 2022
558	"Gamer Love"	0:49:13	September 19, 2022
559	"Bad Art"	0:52:57	September 26, 2022
560	"Mile High Club"	0:48:03	October 3, 2022
561	"Bagels and God"	0:51:45	October 10, 2022
562	"Athletic Lightning Round"	1:01:24	October 17, 2022
563	"Demons"	1:08:30	October 24, 2022
564	"Clam Hands"	0:55:21	October 31, 2022
565	"Party Pooper"	0:53:53	November 7, 2022
566	"Blue Corn Moon"	0:57:58	November 14, 2022
567	"Amir Is Sick"	0:52:59	November 21, 2022
568	"Body Hair"	0:47:03	November 28, 2022
569	"Vasectomy"	0:54:32	December 5, 2022
570	"Wrestling"	0:53:20	December 12, 2022
571	"White Lotus (w/Adam DiMarco!)"	1:25:42	December 19, 2022
572	"Polar Plunge"	0:58:16	December 26, 2022
573	"Polar Plunge 2"	0:49:33	January 3, 2023
574	"Condom Wrapper"	0:58:47	January 9, 2023
575	"Orthodontics"	0:55:59	January 16, 2023
576	"Nose Picker"	0:55:33	January 23, 2023
577	"Amir Is Yogurt"	0:54:59	January 30, 2023
578	"Birthday Blumenfeld"	0:51:32	February 6, 2023
579	"Worst Food City"	1:04:15	February 13, 2023
580	"Kissing Cousins"	0:50:51	February 20, 2023
581	"Born Rick (w/ Charlie Bardey and Natalie Rotter-Laitman)"	1:06:33	February 27, 2023
582	"AOL Instant Messenger"	0:46:43	March 6, 2023
583	"Monopoly"	0:48:13	March 13, 2023
584	"Near Death Experience"	0:53:46	March 20, 2023
585	"The End Is Near"	0:51:16	March 27, 2023
586	"Modern Bar Mitzvah"	0:46:26	April 3, 2023
587	"Leave Me Hanging (w/Allison Williams!)"	1:20:07	April 10, 2023
588	"Smoothies (w/Avital and Jill!)"	1:10:58	April 17, 2023
589	"The End Is Here"	1:34:40	April 24, 2023
