= Bad Internet =

- Genre: Comedy
- Directed by: Tim Wilkerson; Matthew Pollock
- Starring: Grant O'Brien; Siobhan Thompson; James Fitzpatrick; Zac Oyama; Emily Axford; Brian K. Murphy; Mike Trapp; David Cyr Kerns; Evan Watkins; Katie Marovitch; Irene Choi; Mousa Kraish; Cheri Oteri; Larry Hankin; Jack McBrayer; Oscar Nuñez; Elaine Carroll; Will Arnett; Mary Holland; Pat Cassels; Jean Smart; Mindy Sterling; Ed Begley Jr.; John Milhiser; George Wyner
- Country of origin: United States
- Original language: English
- No. of seasons: 1
- No. of episodes: 10

Production
- Executive producers: Jon Cohen; Spencer Griffin; David Gerns
- Producers: TeNeil Moore; Sam Reich; Jillian Vogel; Alex Edge; Michael Schaubach; Sam Sparks
- Cinematography: Barry Elmore
- Running time: 9–14 minutes
- Production company: Big Breakfast Co.

Original release
- Network: YouTube Red
- Release: May 25 – July 20, 2016

Bad Internet is an American web series that premiered on May 25, 2016, on YouTube Premium (then known as YouTube Red). It is produced by CollegeHumor's Los Angeles-based production studio Big Breakfast. The first season contains ten episodes, with only the first—"Which of the 'Friends' are You?"—available to view on YouTube without a YouTube Premium subscription. As of November 2021, it has also been released on Dropout, CollegeHumor's streaming platform. The series was inspired by Charlie Brooker's technology-centered anthology TV show Black Mirror. Sam Reich, CollegeHumor's head of video, said that in creating the series, he wanted to do a project that was both ambitious and true to CollegeHumor's slacker humor heritage. Reich also told Mashable that Bad Internet was "a series built for the Internet."

== Cast ==
The cast on the show included Los Angeles based sketch comedians like Zac Oyama, Siobhan Thompson, Mike Trapp, Emily Axford, and Colton Dunn who are regulars in CollegeHumor content, alongside YouTube celebrities, including Justine Ezarik, Rosanna Pansino, Jordan Maron, Ian Hecox, and Anthony Padilla, and mainstream comedians and character actors like Jack McBrayer, Will Arnett, Jean Smart, Cheri Oteri, Maribeth Monroe, Oscar Nunez, Matt McCarthy, John Milhiser, Larry Hankin, Mary Holland, Stephen Tobolowsky, Mindy Sterling, Ed Begley Jr., and George Wyner.

== Episodes ==
No.	Title	Episode length	Original release date
1	"Which of the "Friends" Are You?"	11:54	May 25, 2016
A society divides citizens into groups based on results from a BuzzFeed quiz that determines which Friends character they are. Featuring Cheri Oteri, Larry Hankin, Irene Choi, Michael Naughton, Rob Yang, and Zac Oyama.
2	"Amazon Foresight"	10:54	May 25, 2016
A man signs up for a new Amazon feature called Foresight, which delivers products before he realizes he wants it. Featuring Mousa Kraish, Jack McBrayer, Maribeth Monroe, Courtney Pauroso, Grant O'Brien, and Zac Oyama.
3	"Your Search History Revealed"	11:37	June 1, 2016
Follows one family after an Anonymous-style hacktivist group releases the public's Internet search histories. Featuring Oscar Nunez, Joanna Going, Jay Jackson, Brendan Caleb Calton, Celesta DeAstis, Adam Conover, and Adam Lustick.
4	"YouTube Death Battle Showdown"	11:26	June 8, 2016
A woman wakes up in the middle of a deadly fight between YouTube stars. Featuring Smosh, IJustine, Rosanna Pansino, CaptainSparklez, Elaine Carroll, Zac Oyama, Mike Trapp, Siobhan Thompson, Brian Murphy, and Grant O'Brien.
5	"The Seven Billionth Wheel"	10:26	June 15, 2016
One man discovers he is the exception to an online dating app that promises to find every single person their soulmate. Featuring Will Arnett, Mary Holland, Grant O'Brien, Britt Lower, and Matt Newell
6	"The Year-Long Ad Experience"	13:40	June 22, 2016
A couple opts in to a system to live in a virtual advertisement for one year in exchange for living ad-free for the rest of their lives. Featuring Colton Dunn, Steve Berg, Corey Landis, Emily Axford, and Pat Cassels.
7	"The President Goes Viral"	9:55	June 29, 2016
With the threat of a catastrophic event that could kill millions, the President of the United States struggles to get the word out. Featuring Jean Smart, Jeff Austin, Grant O'Brien, Siobhan Thompson, and Brian Murphy.
8	"Uber, But Like for People"	10:04	July 6, 2016
A man who holds many gig-economy jobs finds a new service that takes over the worker's body while they sleep. Featuring Mindy Sterling, Ed Begley Jr., Alison Becker, Mike Trapp, and Leonard Robinson.
9	"Secrets of the Mom Web"	10:22	July 13, 2016
After expressing confusion about the origins of an email forwarded to him by his mother, a man is pulled into an online conspiracy headed by a group of moms intent on defrauding the government. Featuring John Milhiser, Stephen Tobolowsky, and Bess Armstrong.
10	"Enter the Hivemind"	8:53	July 20, 2016
A man struggles to connect with his granddaughter until she finally convinces him to join the "Hivemind". Featuring George Wyner, Allie Stamler, and Jean St. James.

== Reception ==
Marissa Martinelli of Slate described the series as "very funny stuff", noting the clear parallels it contained to Black Mirror and Divergent.

== Nominations and awards ==
Year	Association	Category	Nominee(s)	Result
2016	Streamy Awards	Best Ensemble Cast	Brian Murphy; Grant O'Brien; Zac Oyama; Siobhan Thompson; Mike Trapp	Nominated
2016	Streamy Awards	Best Writing	Pat Cassels; Ben Joseph; Zac Oyama; Melinda Taub; Siobhan Thompson; Mike Trapp	Nominated
