= Jake Hurwitz =

American comedian

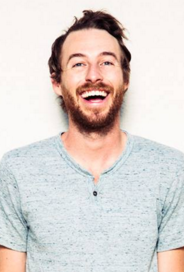
- Jake Hurwitz in 2014
- Born: Jacob Penn Cooper Hurwitz; August 5, 1985 (age 41); New Haven, Connecticut, U.S.
- Education: Hunter College
- Occupations: Comedian, writer, actor
- Years active: 2005–present
- Spouse: Jillian Vogel (m. 2018)
- Children: 1

Jacob Penn Cooper Hurwitz (born August 5, 1985) is an American comedian, writer, actor, and member of the comedy duo Jake and Amir. He was hired by the comedy website CollegeHumor after becoming an intern there in 2006, and has written and appeared in original videos for the website, as well as contributing articles which have been published both online and in print. He also starred in The CollegeHumor Show, an MTV sitcom that ran for one season in 2009. Outside of CollegeHumor, Hurwitz has hosted Myspace's BFF series.

He is best known as the comedy partner of Amir Blumenfeld: the two appear as humorous and exaggerated versions of themselves in the web series Jake and Amir, with Hurwitz generally assuming the role of the straight man. Originally made as a hobby by the pair, the series was later produced by CollegeHumor. Beginning in April 2016, they announced the streaming of their new video series, Lonely and Horny, exclusively on Vimeo. The pair have also hosted numerous live shows, and started the advice podcast If I Were You in 2013. On August 1, 2015, Hurwitz and Blumenfeld launched the comedy podcast network HeadGum alongside Marty Michael.

== Career ==
Hurwitz has cited the television series Arrested Development and comedian Mitch Hedberg as major influences in his comedy styling.

=== CollegeHumor ===
In 2005, Hurwitz began to write a column for the comedy website CollegeHumor while attending school. When he transferred to Hunter College, he became an intern at the company—he summarized his duties saying "I put together desks and microwaved". He later got a full-time position at CollegeHumor, where he wrote and acted in original videos. Having originally wanted to be a sitcom writer, he "spent a year or two feeling really uncomfortable on camera", but now says he "love[s] it".

Hurwitz was a cast member on The CollegeHumor Show, a 2009 sitcom set in the CollegeHumor offices and featuring videos from the website. His character's biography on the MTV website reads: "Jake might not be smarter than his coworkers, but he's better looking, and that's good enough for him." The show received mixed reviews. Pajiba's Dustin Rowles dismissed it as "a series of atrocious sketches haphazardly strung together", while Liz Shannon Miller, editor for online streaming site Newteevee, criticized the show's sitcom format and wrote that she "would have preferred a stronger debut," but gave the premiere four stars out of a possible five. After it had gone nearly a year without being recommissioned, Hurwitz commented "We stopped holding our breath for a second season".

=== BFF ===
In 2009, Hurwitz was selected as the host of the second season of BFF, a game show produced for Myspace that Hurwitz described as "The Dating Game for friends". This was the first time he had been hired to appear in a non-CollegeHumor series; he called it "the first time I've been tapped on the shoulder to do anything that wasn't frat boy humor" and said the show's format was "out of [his] wheelhouse". Hurwitz was given the chance to film a Jake and Amir video on the set, which he said "turned out pretty well". Tubefilter's Marc Hustvedt said of the season: "It's a bit of a shame to see the typically absurd Hurwitz stripped of any real comedy purpose and thrown into what is pretty squarely a young, fashion-loving women's chit-chat." Although some episodes of the season appeared to have been viewed over 500,000 times, Hustvedt said that many of them appeared to come from embedded video advertising and doubted the veracity of this number.

=== Jake and Amir ===
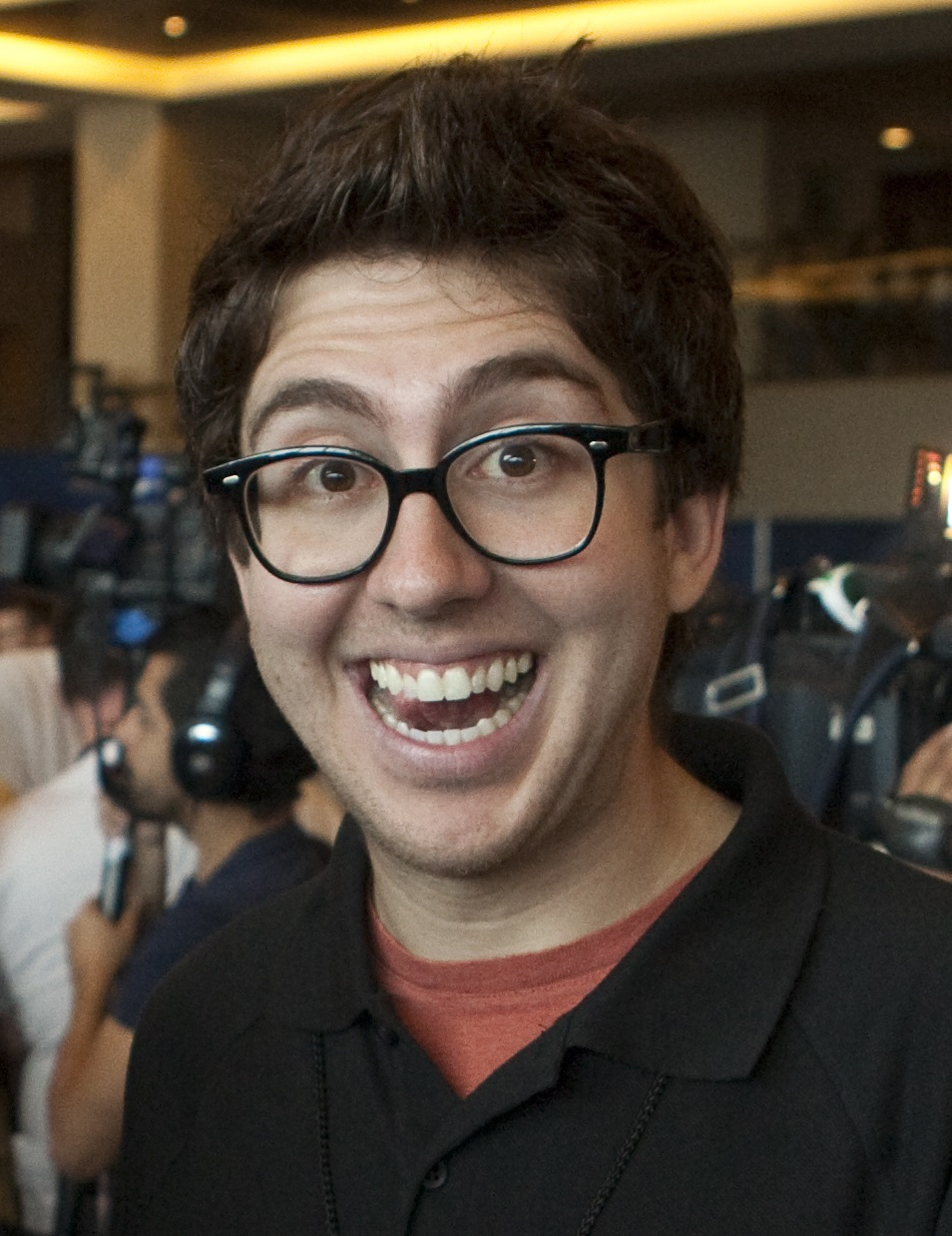
Hurwitz's comedy partner Amir Blumenfeld in 2010

Hurwitz met his colleague Amir Blumenfeld in 2006, when the former began his internship at CollegeHumor. When their offices moved to Union Square, the two were seated across from each other. Hurwitz received a digital camera as a birthday present from his father, and the two used it to make videos together, which they uploaded to the video-sharing website Vimeo. Hurwitz thought Blumenfeld was "the funniest person in the office" and said "Amir and I were constantly joking around in different, strange characters, so it seemed natural that once I had a camera we began to record it." Their first video was called "Quick Characters": it was unscripted, and involved either Hurwitz or Blumenfeld spontaneously pointing a camera at the other and instructing them to act in a certain way.

The two later began the web series Jake and Amir, episodes of which they posted to jakeandamir.com In it, Hurwitz plays Jake, a "normal guy", and Blumenfeld plays Amir, his annoying and obsessive co-worker, who craves Jake's attention.

Hurwitz summed up the writing process by saying "me and Amir sit in a room and we make each other laugh for an hour or two and somehow we leave with a script"—he also noted the series' increased production values, saying that he and Blumenfeld have become better at editing it over time. Describing how his character has developed, Hurwitz said "I think the Jake character has become a little more wacky, which is fun for me. We've given me triggers for my insecurity and then I get to be a little weird which is cool." He also noted that the characters' roles had swapped somewhat because "when we're writing together we do each other's voices sometimes ... it was just making us laugh a lot when I was doing the crazy/funny man and he was doing the straight man when it came to fashion and girls."

=== If I Were You ===
On May 13, 2013, Hurwitz and Blumenfeld announced their first new project since Jake and Amir: a comedy audio podcast called If I Were You, in which they give advice to listeners who submit questions. Kayla Culver of The Concordian lauded the podcast as "comfortable to listen to" and "genuinely funny" and said "It's like listening to two best friends having a hilarious conversation on the couch next to you." Conversely, The Guardian's Miranda Sawyer described If I Were You as "a typical example of a comedy podcast" and "amiable enough", but said it contained "far too much laughing", commenting that "New Yorkers Jake and Amir laugh and laugh, giggle and chortle their way around a topic" and "if I wanted stream-of-consciousness waffle with the occasional funny line, I'd listen to [my small children]."

=== Lonely and Horny ===
In 2016, Hurwitz and Blumenfeld released an on-demand comedy series called Lonely and Horny on Vimeo. The series was picked up by CollegeHumor for its second season.

=== HeadGum ===
In 2015, following the success of Hurwitz and Blumenfeld's If I Were You podcast, the duo founded the HeadGum podcasting network in tandem with their friend and colleague Marty Michael. HeadGum hosts 75 unique shows as of January 2026, many of which are produced by the duo's former CollegeHumor coworkers. Some of the notable programs that can be found on the network include Why Won't You Date Me?, Gilmore Guys, and Doughboys. If I Were You and Not Another D&D Podcast, both of which feature Hurwitz as a co-host, are also featured on the network.

=== Not Another D&D Podcast ===
In 2018, Hurwitz alongside Brian Murphy, Emily Axford, and Caldwell Tanner launched Not Another D&D Podcast, a Dungeons & Dragons podcast featuring Murphy as DM and Hurwitz, Axford, and Tanner as the players. Their first main campaign, in which Hurwitz played a human champion fighter named Hardwon Surefoot, began on February 8, 2018, and concluded on May 10, 2020. Their second campaign, in which Hurwitz played Henry "Hank" Hogfish, a human echo knight fighter, aired from October 8, 2020, to November 20, 2021. In their third campaign, which began on January 13, 2022, to December 22, 2024, Hurwitz plays Calder Kildé, a half-giant eldritch knight fighter. A fourth and ongoing campaign began on March 26, 2026, and is currently ongoing, in which Hurwitz plays Aux, a battlesmith artificer. The podcast has also featured a few smaller campaigns, including "Trinyvale" (DMed by Tanner), wherein Hurwitz played a half-elven ranger named Nyack, and "Hot Boy Summer" (DMed by Axford), wherein Hurwitz played a tiefling bard named Tread Nevers.

== Personal life ==
Hurwitz was born in Connecticut. The son of a Jewish father and a Christian mother, he had a Bar Mitzvah and attended Hebrew school, but also celebrated Christmas and Easter. He attended Hamden Hall Country Day School for high school then went on to study at Moravian University then Southern Connecticut State University and finally Hunter College and New School University in New York City.

From 2009 to 2012, Hurwitz was in a relationship with Bee Shaffer, the daughter of fashion editor Anna Wintour, whom he met after she began working at CollegeHumor. Since 2013, he has been in a long-term relationship with Jillian Vogel, whom he married in August 2018. The two share a child.

== Filmography ==
=== Television ===
Year	Title	Role	Notes
2009	The CollegeHumor Show	Jake	
2012–2013	Money from Strangers		With Amir Blumenfeld; 2 episodes
2015	Adam Ruins Everything	Matt	1 episode
2016–2017	Animals.	Various	4 episodes
2018	Bobcat Goldthwait's Misfits & Monsters	Ben	1 episode

=== Online video ===
Year	Title	Role	Notes
2007–Present	Jake and Amir	Jake	Also writer
2007–2015	Hardly Working	Jake	Also writer
2010–2015	CollegeHumor Originals	Various	
2016	Lonely and Horny	Josh Rice	Also director and writer

== Bibliography ==
- The writers of CollegeHumor.com (2011). CollegeHumor: The Website. The Book. New York: Da Capo Press. ISBN 9780306820496.
