= Not Another D&D Podcast =

Comedy podcast

- Genre: Actual play Dungeons & Dragons; Comedy improv
- Country of origin: United States
- Language: English

Cast and voices
- Hosted by: Brian K. Murphy; Emily Axford; Jake Hurwitz; Caldwell Tanner

Production
- Length: 40–120 minutes

Publication
- No. of episodes: Bahumia: 100; Trinyvale: 22; Hot Boy Summer: 11; Eldermourne: 41; Ba-two-mia: 72; Twilight Sanctorum: 4 Skaldova: 12
- Original release: February 2, 2018
- Provider: Headgum
- Updates: Weekly (Thursday)

Related
- Website: naddpod.com

Not Another D&D Podcast (NADDPod or NADDPOD) is an actual play Dungeons & Dragons podcast hosted by CollegeHumor alumni Brian Murphy, Emily Axford, Jake Hurwitz, and Caldwell Tanner. Since its premiere on the Headgum podcast network in February 2018, the show has consisted of three major campaigns, several shorter adventures, and numerous one-shots. As of December 2025, the podcast has over 38,000 Patreon subscribers and is ranked among Patreon's top 10 earners.

== History ==
In 2016, Murphy, Axford, and Tanner released their first podcast 8-Bit Book Club with Headgum, where the team incorporated Dungeons & Dragons mechanics into discussions of video game book adaptations. In 2017, Hurwitz approached the trio curious about playing Dungeons & Dragons for the first time. Murphy then led the initiative to turn the invitation to play together into an actual play podcast; Hurwitz played his first session of D&D on the first episode of the podcast. The launch of Not Another D&D Podcast in 2018 took place amid a "renaissance" of actual play shows.

== Campaigns ==
Since the inception of the podcast, the four hosts have each taken on the role of Dungeon Masters in their own respective campaigns. The team is occasionally joined by guests including Brennan Lee Mulligan, Zac Oyama, Lou Wilson, Nathan Yaffe, Siobhan Thompson, Amir Blumenfeld, Jasper William Cartwright, and Adam Conover, many of whom have also collaborated with the creators in other productions such as Dimension 20 and Jake and Amir. The podcast primarily uses Dungeon & Dragons 5th Edition, but have utilized the 2024 version of Dungeons & Dragons 5th edition and Pathfinder second edition for various campaigns.

The three main campaigns, which feature Murphy as Dungeon Master, generally follow the story of three unlikely heroes in their attempts to fight against the evils set before them by those who failed to save the world. The podcast has also released several short adventures and various one-shots. Each campaign is set in a homebrewed fantasy world developed by the hosts. For instance, the first and third campaigns are set in Murphy's original homebrewed world of Bahumia. Most episodes feature a soundtrack of music composed by Axford.

Not Another D&D Podcast has toured across the United States, United Kingdom, Ireland, and Australia, performing live shows in the form of one-shot adventures. In October 2023, the podcast performed a live show celebrating the show's 5th anniversary at Carnegie Hall in New York City. In November 2025, they announced a live show at Radio City Music Hall scheduled for April 10, 2026. In January 2026, they announced a live show at Sydney Opera House scheduled for March 16, 2026.

Campaign	Dungeon Master	Episodes	Originally released	
Campaign	Dungeon Master	Episodes	First released	Last released
Main campaigns
1 (Bahumia)	Brian Murphy	100	February 2, 2018	May 10, 2020
2 (Eldermourne)	Brian Murphy	41	October 8, 2020	November 20, 2021
3 (Ba-two-mia)	Brian Murphy	72	February 10, 2022	December 23, 2024
Short adventures
Trinyvale	Caldwell Tanner	22	November 11, 2018	July 25, 2020
Hot Boy Summer	Emily Axford	11	August 14, 2020	October 29, 2022
Trinyvale X Bahumia	Caldwell Tanner	3	February 10, 2023	February 24, 2023
Twilight Sanctorum	Emily Axford	4	December 19, 2023	December 29, 2023
Skaldova	Jake Hurwitz	12	February 7, 2025	May 30, 2025
Trinyvale X Strahd	Caldwell Tanner	23	June 20, 2025	February 20, 2026
Gangs of Neo Galaderon	Brian Murphy	13	March 26, 2026	TBA
One-shots
One-shots	Various	10	September 20, 2018	TBA
