= Jake and Amir =

Comedy duo

- Notable work: Jake and Amir; If I Were You; Lonely and Horny; Segments

Comedy career
- Years active: 2007–present
- Medium: Podcast, web series
- Genre: Comedy
- Members: Jake Hurwitz; Amir Blumenfeld
- Website: jakeandamir.com

Jake and Amir is an American comedy duo made up of podcasters and former CollegeHumor writers Jake Hurwitz and Amir Blumenfeld. The duo came into prominence in 2007 when they began writing and starring in the web series Jake and Amir. The program would later be picked up and produced by CollegeHumor. It portrays humorous versions of Jake and Amir, where Jake is usually depicted as a sensible "regular guy" and Amir as his annoying co-worker who engages in bizarre and sometimes surreal hijinks which involuntarily involve Jake, much to his chagrin.

In 2013, Jake and Amir started the podcast, If I Were You, an advice show where listeners email in questions which are answered in a humorous way. Their involvement in podcasting led them to founding the podcasting network HeadGum. After the conclusion of If I Were You, the duo launched a podcast called Segments.

Jake and Amir left CollegeHumor in 2015 to focus on producing their own content. In 2016, the duo released an on-demand comedy series called Lonely and Horny on Vimeo. The series was picked up by CollegeHumor for its second season.

== Online video ==
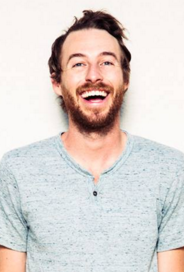
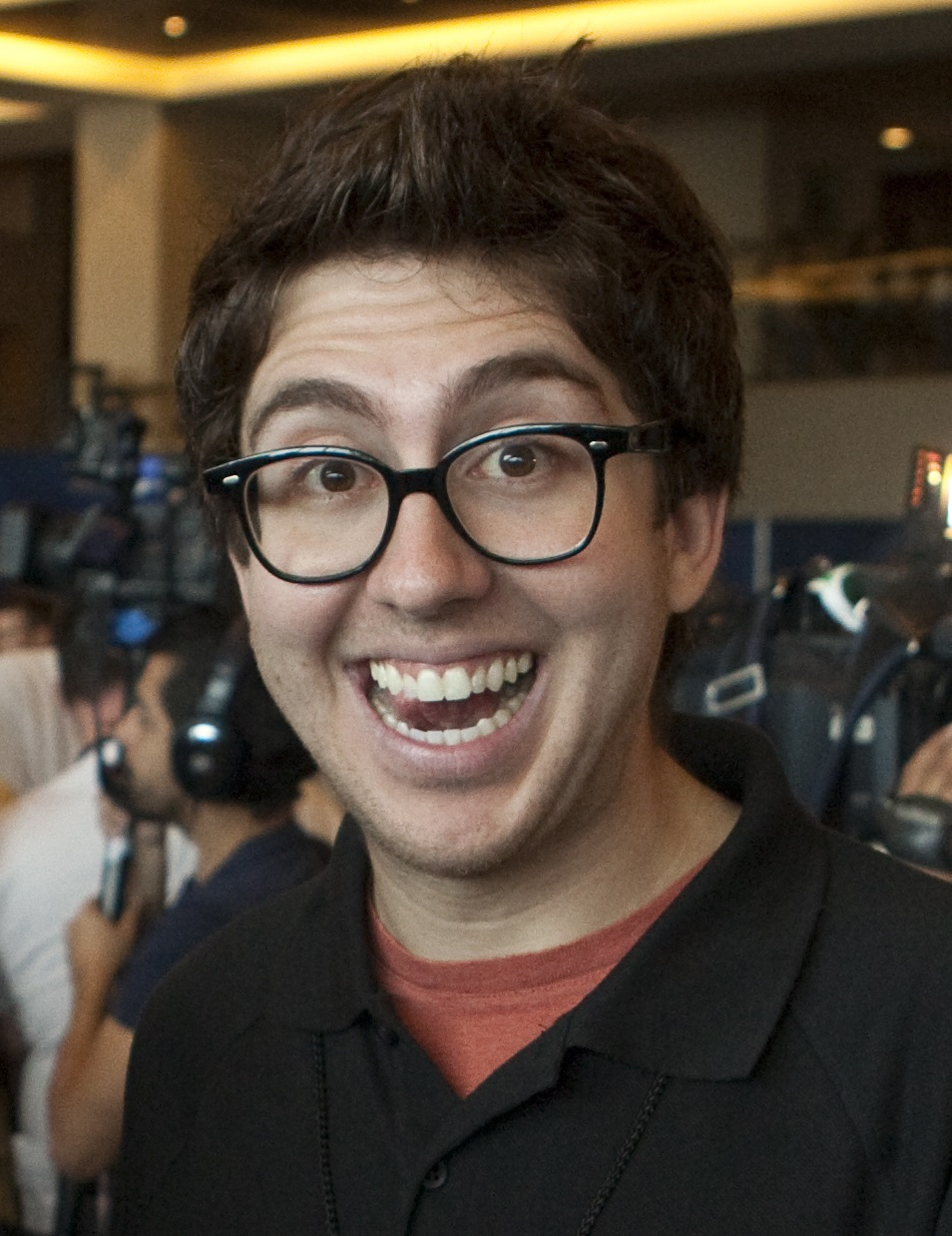
Jake Hurwitz (left) and Amir Blumenfeld

=== Jake and Amir ===
Jake and Amir is a web series set in CollegeHumor's office in New York City and later Los Angeles where Jake Hurwitz and Amir Blumenfeld played humorous versions of themselves: Jake is usually depicted as a sensible "straight man" and Amir as his annoying, obsessive, and odd co-worker. Running for over eight years, Jake and Amir was CollegeHumor's longest-running series and has amassed approximately one-billion views as of April 2017.

The show was started in 2007 as a way for Jake and Amir to have fun at work. As it grew in popularity, CollegeHumor began paying Jake and Amir to make the videos for their website. Over its eight-year run, the web series featured a number of guests, including actors Thomas Middleditch, Kumail Nanjiani, Ben Schwartz, Rick Fox, and Milana Vayntrub, as well as a cameo by actor Ed Helms as 'Mickey' in one of the final episodes. In 2011, CollegeHumor released Jake and Amir: Fired, a thirty-minute special in which Amir is fired and Jake is promoted. The special was CollegeHumor's first paid content, and was available for purchase online or as a DVD.

Jake and Amir ended in February 2015 when CollegeHumor released the series' eight-part finale. On October 27, 2016, the pair returned to CollegeHumor for a single episode of Jake and Amir, titled Jake and Amir: Donald Trump, to comment on the 2016 United States presidential election.

The pair returned with another video on March 31, 2020, on their HeadGum channel in the midst of the Coronavirus pandemic with a skit about Amir's social distancing ideas.

In April of 2021, the majority of the videos from the Jake and Amir series were removed from Collegehumor's YouTube channel and transferred to a new channel run by the pair (called "JakeandAmir"), as they had regained the intellectual rights to create new episodes whenever they chose.

In August of 2021, the first new episode of "Jake and Amir" was released on the duo's YouTube channel.

=== Lonely and Horny ===
In December 2013, Deadline reported that Jake and Amir were being brought on by TBS to star in a comedy directed by Ed Helms. When news came in February 2015 of Jake and Amir's departure from CollegeHumor, fans pushed for TBS to pick up the production with the Twitter trending campaign #GreenLightJakeandAmir. TBS ultimately declined the proposal, but TruTV noticed the social media campaign and ordered a pilot episode. On December 20, 2015, it was announced that TruTV had decided not to pick up the show.

While TruTV and TBS ultimately did not run their TV series, Jake and Amir were offered the opportunity to return to Vimeo to create an original web series. On April 8, 2016, a new web series titled Lonely and Horny, directed by Jake and written by and starring Jake and Amir, was released on Vimeo. The on-demand series is about a 30-something-year-old Ruby Jade, played by Amir, who wants to have sex more than anything. His dating-coach, Josh Rice, played by Jake, sets out to help Ruby find love.

While Lonely and Horny is intended to be a "completely different universe" than their original Jake and Amir web series, Isabelle Hellyer of Vice writes that Ruby Jade is, "written to be flawed in almost all the same ways as Jake and Amir's Amir." Conversely, Hellyer writes that the straight-man character Josh Rice is "the most multifaceted role they've ever written." The New Yorker's Ian Crouch compares the series with Jake and Amir, writing that many of the jokes and themes from the duo's shorter sketches have been "exported to the longer-form space of 'Lonely and Horny,'" and that, while "frequently very funny, it lacks the comedic density of their best short sketches."

On September 26, 2018, CollegeHumor announced the production of a second season of Lonely and Horny as part of their subscription service, but in 2019 the agreement between Jake and Amir and CollegeHumor ended and the show is no longer available on Dropout.

== Podcasting ==
=== If I Were You ===
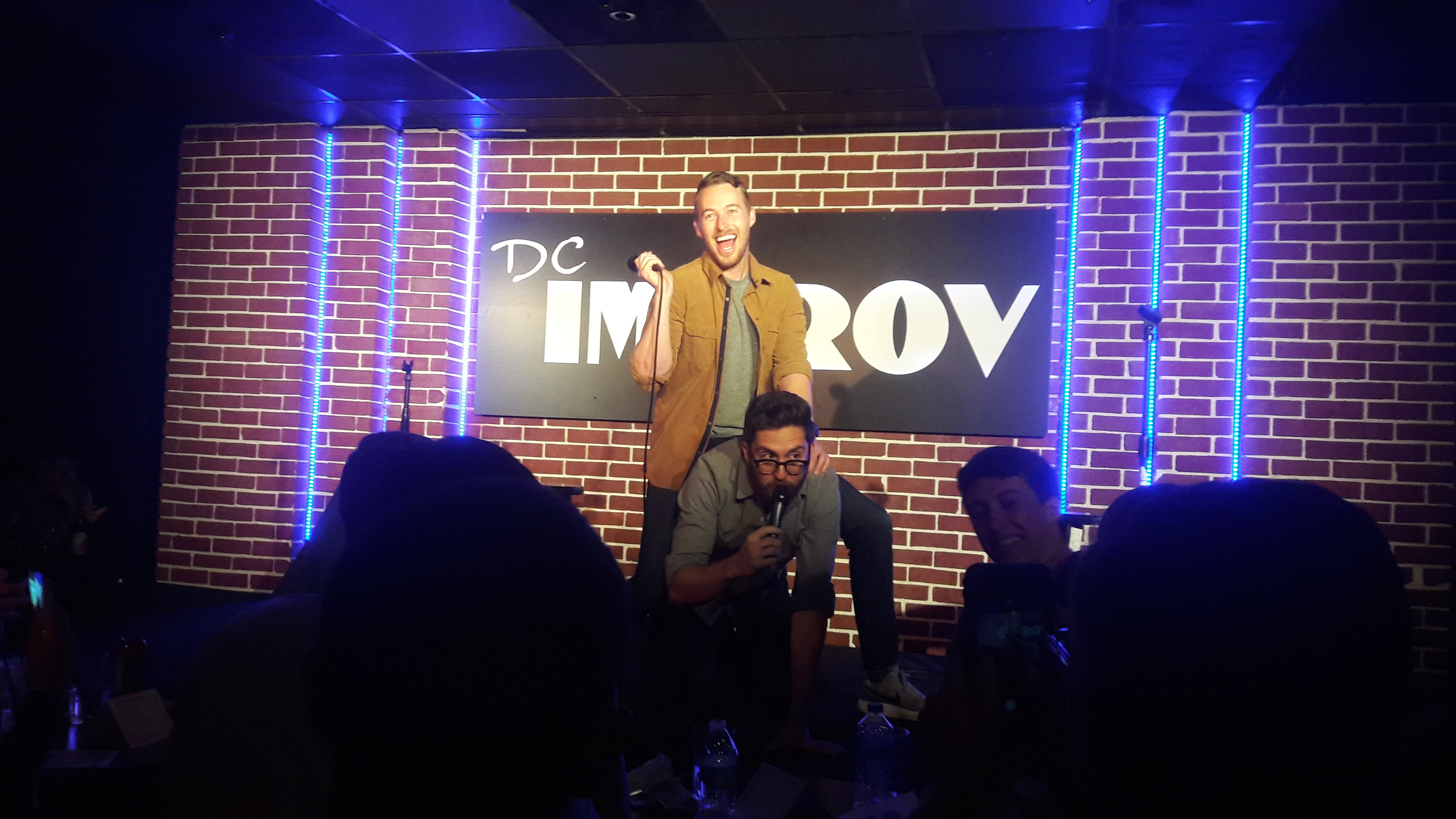
Jake and Amir during a live recording of If I Were You at DC Improv

In May 2013, Jake and Amir started the podcast If I Were You as an advice show where they take listener questions and try to answer them in a helpful but funny way. Jake said that If I Were You was partially inspired by the NPR show Car Talk, in that their audience listens for the banter between the two hosts, not necessarily the questions themselves.

Averaging 1 million views per month, Amir says that If I Were You's audience is primarily made up of 15- to 34-year-olds. Jake says that they like advising people younger than them, "because we were there, and we came out the other side." More than that, Jake says that he enjoys reaching out to "nerdy" younger fans because they can act as role-models to show that their best days are ahead of them: "We're like a little beacon of hope for losers that are told they're gonna be cool in ten years."

Kayla Culver for The Concordian writes, "the responses Jake and Amir give probably wouldn't qualify as great advice but it's honestly not the worst advice ever given." Admitting that they are not experts who should be giving out advice, Amir puts forward that he at least "tends to think of us as expert 20-somethings because we've been doing it for a decade."

In 2018, Jake and Amir began producing a video version of the podcast for their Patreon page supporters.

In 2023, Jake and Amir announced they would be ending the podcast indefinitely. The final episode of If I Were You titled "589: The End Is Here" was released on April 24, 2023.

=== HeadGum ===
On August 1, 2015, after leaving CollegeHumor, Jake and Amir founded a podcast network named HeadGum with their friend Marty Michael. Jake and Amir's podcast, If I Were You served as the network's flagship program. HeadGum expanded into online video in 2016 when they launched a YouTube channel for comedy videos. The network is headquartered in Los Angeles, and hosts 75 unique shows as of January 2026, many of which are produced by the duo's former CollegeHumor coworkers.

=== Segments ===
Following the conclusion of If I Were You and a brief hiatus, Jake and Amir introduced Segments. Unlike their previous podcast, which focused solely on offering advice to listeners, Segments features a dynamic format with multiple segments per episode. The podcast description reads:

Jake and Amir host a constantly changing show that re-invents itself multiple times per episode. Each segment brings a completely new topic for Jake and Amir to discuss, dissect, and explore.
