= Nic Rad =

- Born: September 18, 1982 (age 44); Cleveland, Ohio, United States
- Education: Savannah College of Art and Design; New York Academy of Art
- Known for: Painter
- Movement: Unclassified

Nic Rad is an artist based in New York City. He graduated from the Savannah College of Art and Design in Savannah, Georgia. Rad completed his master's degree at the New York Academy of Art. He was also educated in Balleroy, France and Florence, Italy during fellowship stays.

Rad is also the producer and featured guest of several podcasts under the HeadGum network such as Twinnovation.

== Career ==
Rad worked on commercial projects for various clients including VH1, MTV2, Mike Ruiz, Nicole Atkins and the Sea, and Wolfmother.

Rad's first show, "Barry and the Universe," debuted in New York City at RARE Gallery in Chelsea in January 2008.

In 2010 Rad's show "People Matter" opened at RARE. The show featured 99 portraits of internet personalities. The subjects were "crowdsourced" and the work was given away for free based on digital interactions.

Rad has produced a series of products, including "Hope Soap on a Rope," through Grey Area, a New York-based design and fine art editions gallery.
