= Hot Date =

American comedy television series

- Genre: Comedy
- Created by: Emily Axford; Brian K. Murphy
- Written by: Emily Axford; Brian K. Murphy
- Directed by: Matthew Pollock
- Starring: Emily Axford; Brian K. Murphy
- Composer: Jay Wadley
- Country of origin: United States
- Original language: English
- No. of seasons: 2
- No. of episodes: 20

Production
- Executive producers: Will Arnett; Emily Axford; Drew Buckley; Marc Forman; Chris Grant; Spencer Griffin; Luke Kelly-Clyne; Brian Murphy; Peter Principato; Sam Reich; Brian Steinberg; Joel Zadak; Brian Stern
- Running time: 22 minutes
- Production companies: Electric Avenue Productions; Principato-Young Entertainment (season 1); Riviere Productions (season 1); Artists First (season 2); Electus; Big Breakfast; Propagate (season 2)

Original release
- Network: Pop
- Release: November 8, 2017 – October 18, 2019

Hot Date is an American comedy television series created by, and starring, Emily Axford and Brian K. Murphy. The series premiered on Pop on November 8, 2017. On January 30, 2019, the series was renewed for a second season which premiered on September 20, 2019.

Before it was adapted into a television series, Hot Date was originally a series of short comedy videos created by CollegeHumor, also called Hot Date.

== Cast ==
- Emily Axford as Emily
- Brian K. Murphy as Murph
- Will Arnett as Sam Keurig
- Kevin Pollak as Father
- John Albaugh as Tucker
- Carisa Barreca as Sue
- Alison Becker as Libby
- Joel Boyd as Bernard
- Brooke Breit as Tawney
- Bria Cloyd as Nikki
- Brianne Fitzpatrick as Kara
- Jon Gabrus as Luke
- Patrick Gough as Travis
- Terence Bernie Hines as James
- Alison Banowsky as Ivy
- Ben Schwartz as Ian
- Japhet Balaban as Nick
- Ashlyn Hughes as Caitlin
- Erin Long as Kiki
- Vernon Mina as Lorne
- Kiley B. Moore as Ginny
- Scott Morehead as Cooper
- Cody Reiss as Gordo
- David Smith as Jaden
- Tien Tran as Laura
- Travis Turner as Mike
- Kimberly Michelle Vaughn as Rachel
- Jenna Kanell as Erin

== Episodes ==
Season	Episodes	Originally released	
Season	Episodes	First released	Last released
1	10	November 8, 2017	January 3, 2018
2	10	September 20, 2019	October 18, 2019

=== Season 1 (2017–18) ===
No. overall	No. in season	Title	Directed by	Written by	Original release date	Prod. code
1	1	"Throwback Thursday"	Matthew Pollock	Emily Axford & Brian K. Murphy	November 8, 2017	101
Murph thinks Emily is too concerned with her exes' personal lives, so he seeks out his own ex, Bridget, to prove a point about the dangers of dwelling on the past. Married suburbanites Beth and Seth desperately try to resuscitate their wild sides, and a reality dating show's finale episode captivates the nation with a jaw-dropping conclusion.
2	2	"For Real, Where Have All My Friends Gone?"	Matthew Pollock	Emily Axford & Brian K. Murphy	November 8, 2017	103
Murph and Emily consider finding a new couple to hang out with when Mike and Laura prove too wholesome. Bridget wonders if she'll ever love a man...or woman again. Darius and Denise fight over a guy's tattoo, and Will Arnett joins as podcast host, Sam Keurig, reflecting on his complicated history with friendship.
3	3	"Double Standards"	Matthew Pollock	Emily Axford & Brian K. Murphy	November 15, 2017	102
Emily and Murph are turned away from a hip nightclub. Self-professed heart breaker Jeremy falls for Rebecca. A dad tries to give his twin teenagers "the talk."
4	4	"Gold Diggers"	Matthew Pollock	Emily Axford & Brian K. Murphy	November 22, 2017	104
Murph and Emily come into a large sum of money following the death of a relative and decide to splurge at a fancy restaurant. Brittany and Kiki try convincing Rachel to stay with her rich boyfriend, Ian (Ben Schwartz). Travis and Karin let a mobile payment app take over their entire relationship, and Tawney considers taking up a new life as a "Sugar Momma."
5	5	"Relationship Goals"	Matthew Pollock	Emily Axford & Brian K. Murphy	November 29, 2017	106
Murph and Emily decide to spice things up in the bedroom at a sex store (run by Mena Suvari). Bridget and Darius bicker while trying to keep up appearances on Instagram. Ellie turns to private investigator Jack Briggs and learns an awful secret about her husband.
6	6	"Adulting"	Matthew Pollock	Emily Axford & Brian K. Murphy	December 6, 2017	109
Murph and Emily host a potluck. Beth and Seth experience a night of erotic theatre. A recent divorcee thinks twice about dating a college student.
7	7	"On Again, Off Again"	Matthew Pollock	Emily Axford & Brian K. Murphy	December 13, 2017	107
Emily and Murph try to repair a friend's relationship after game night goes awry. Rideshare driver Creighton picks up passengers while fighting with his jealous girlfriend Elyzabeth. Popstar exes attack each other.
8	8	"Babies"	Matthew Pollock	Emily Axford & Brian K. Murphy	December 20, 2017	108
Murph cares for a very sick Emily. Rebecca's blind date gets wasted. Teen couple Kyle and Hayley vow to run away together.
9	9	"Matchmaking"	Matthew Pollock	Emily Axford & Brian K. Murphy	December 27, 2017	105
Emily and Murph try to set up their single friends. Loretta asks her son for help with her dating profile. Kiki and Hannah school Jeremy on hook-up apps.
10	10	"Blackout Brunch"	Matthew Pollock	Emily Axford & Brian K. Murphy	January 3, 2018	110
Bottomless mimosas get away from Murph and Emily. Mike and Laura get in a fight. Bridget and Brad think about getting back together.

=== Season 2 (2019) ===
No. overall	No. in season	Title	Directed by	Written by	Original release date	Prod. code
11	1	"Apartment Hunting"	Matthew Pollock	Emily Axford & Brian Murphy	September 20, 2019	201
Murph and Emily have been evicted from their apartment and have to compete with another couple to apply for a new one. Bridget is moving in with her new tech millionaire boyfriend who doesn't approve of her truck full of "baggage." Across town, it's splitsville for young couple Hannah and Brennan, who both want to keep their awesome apartment.
12	2	"Family"	Matthew Pollock	Emily Axford & Brian Murphy	September 20, 2019	202
Murph and Emily try to prove they can plan their wedding, but the barn they book turns out to be a disaster. Emily receives inappropriate advice from her Mee Maw. Drama erupts when Steve asks Ashley to marry him, but reveals he asked for her dad's approval.
13	3	"Jobs"	Matthew Pollock	Emily Axford & Brian Murphy	September 27, 2019	203
Murph is promoted at work and wants to celebrate, but Em's just been fired and replaced with a "robot" aka a scanner. Em becomes irate over technology's invasion of her life, which escalates as she finds her local jazz bar has become a silent disco run by AI. To fight off boredom, Bridget decides to get a job as a life coach. She meets a client at a local cafe, where young barista Kyle is being hounded by his mother Loretta, who accidentally unionizes the staff when she finds out they don't get health insurance.
14	4	"Wedding Planning"	Matthew Pollock	Emily Axford & Brian Murphy	September 27, 2019	204
Emily and Murph try to manage their wedding invite list but are tested when invited to a party. Bridget surprises Bryce with news that she's pregnant, hoping their announcement goes viral. Gaudy wedding planners Kitty and Stan fleece a sweet couple.
15	5	"Bed & Breakfast"	Matthew Pollock	Emily Axford & Brian Murphy	October 4, 2019	205
A relaxing getaway at a Bed and Breakfast turns into a nightmare as Em and Murph are pressured by the creepy host to mingle at a cocktail hour.
16	6	"Rate 'Em & Weep"	Matthew Pollock	Emily Axford & Brian Murphy	October 4, 2019	206
Murph and Emily find out about a new app called DateRate. Rebecca decides not to use a sperm donor to have a child and instead interview men for unprotected sex.
17	7	"Couple's Therapy"	Matthew Pollock	Emily Axford & Brian Murphy	October 11, 2019	207
Emily and Murph head to couples counseling to untangle the stress of wedding planning. Cole pours his heart out to the stripper giving him a lap dance and Hannah holds a friendly Lyft driver, Creighton, hostage in exchange for dating advice.
18	8	"Kids"	Matthew Pollock	Emily Axford & Brian Murphy	October 11, 2019	208
Em and Murph go undercover at a mommy meetup to find out if being parents is for them. Bridget's gender reveal party doesn't go the way she hoped. Online personality FITMOM demonstrates how to win the unspoken competition that is motherhood.
19	9	"Ex-Communication"	Matthew Pollock	Emily Axford & Brian Murphy	October 18, 2019	209
After a fight with Emily, Murph heads to the bar to blow off some steam and consider if Emily really is "the one."
20	10	"The Wedding"	Matthew Pollock	Emily Axford & Brian Murphy	October 18, 2019	210
After sustaining injuries in an incident, Emily and Murph plan to get married immediately for the insurance; Bridget goes into labour and realises her baby will be born a Sagittarius, unless she can hold it in until midnight to make it a Capricorn.
