= Middle of the Night Show =

American late-night television series

- Genre: Comedy
- Presented by: Brian Murphy
- Country of origin: United States
- Original language: English
- No. of seasons: 1
- No. of episodes: 9

Production
- Executive producers: Jay Chapman; Jon Cohen; Charlie Todd
- Running time: 22 minutes
- Production company: Big Breakfast

Original release
- Network: MTV
- Release: October 8 – December 10, 2015

Middle of the Night Show is an American late-night television series hosted by Brian Murphy. The series premiered on MTV on October 8, 2015.

== Episodes ==
No.	Title	Original release date	US viewers (millions)
1	"Thomas Middleditch"	October 8, 2015	0.26
2	"Jordin Sparks"	October 15, 2015	0.24
3	"The Miz"	October 22, 2015	0.25
4	"Flula Borg"	October 29, 2015	0.27
5	"Adam Pally"	November 5, 2015	N/A
6	"Nina Agdal"	November 12, 2015	N/A
7	"Waka Flocka Flame"	November 19, 2015	0.20
8	"Emily Kinney"	December 3, 2015	0.16
9	"Anthony Anderson"	December 10, 2015	0.25
