= Headgum =

American podcast network

- Industry: Podcasting
- Founded: August 2015
- Founders: Marty Michael; Amir Blumenfeld; Jake Hurwitz
- Headquarters: Los Angeles, US
- Number of locations: 2
- Products: If I Were You; Why Won't You Date Me?; Doughboys; Gilmore Guys
- Website: headgum.com

Headgum is an American podcasting network founded in 2015 by Marty Michael, Amir Blumenfeld, and Jake Hurwitz. The latter two – known collectively as comedy duo Jake and Amir – built upon the success of their podcast If I Were You to launch the network, with the show serving as its flagship program. Before founding Headgum, Michael sold advertising space and branded content for CollegeHumor. Headgum has studios in Los Angeles and New York and, as of March 2019, hosts 57 shows, 34 of which are ongoing. Headgum also features an active YouTube channel and presents Headgum Live!, a series of live shows featuring podcast hosts from the network.

== Programming ==
=== Current ===
==== A Funny Feeling ====
Comedians and supernatural enthusiasts Betsy Sodaro and Marcy Jarreau discuss paranormal experiences with their comedian friends and celebrity guests. Past guests include Aubrey Plaza and Sasheer Zamata. The show debuted on September 29, 2017.

==== All Fantasy Everything ====
Host Ian Karmel – with co-hosts Sean Jordan and David Gborie – conducts a fantasy draft for pop culture topics with guests. People who have appeared on the podcast include Ron Funches and Kumail Nanjiani, who together drafted video games; Jon Cryer, who drafted candy; and Katie Nolan, who drafted MTV shows. The show premiered on September 15, 2016, and has aired 125 episodes as of March 28, 2019.

John-Michael Bond of The Daily Dot praised All Fantasy Everything as one of the top comedy podcasts of 2018, describing it as "a refreshing change of pace".

==== Buckets With Amir Blumenfeld ====
Amir Blumenfeld and guests discuss basketball. Buckets premiered on August 22, 2018, and has featured appearances from Ben Schwartz; Jerry Ferrara; and Hayes Davenport.

==== Corked ====
Corked is a scripted "true" crime comedy set in Napa Valley about a brash winemaker with a secret past, his missing girlfriend, and a jilted roughneck from Louisiana who pulls an investigative journalist into a mystery that quickly consumes his life and career. The show was written, directed, and edited by Giancarlo Fiorentini and Jonathan Grimm, and stars Anthony Gioe, Whitmer Thomas, Jon Gabrus, Betsy Sodaro, Natalie Palamides, Dan Klein, Mary Holland, Josh Ruben, Lou Wilson, and Ally Beardsley. Corked debuted as Headgum's first scripted podcast on August 16, 2022. The miniseries concluded its 4 episode run on September 6, 2022.

Lauren Passell of Lifehacker named Corked one of the funniest fiction podcasts, stating that the show "mixes silliness with a traditional true crime format, making it a pleasing surprise for anyone who is familiar with public radio investigations".

==== Doughboys ====
Doughboys features Mike Mitchell and Nick Wiger reviewing chain restaurants. The show has featured appearances from Sarah Silverman, for the review of McDonald's breakfast; Ike Barinholtz, for the review of Top Round Roast Beef; Haley Joel Osment, for the review of Quiznos; and Gillian Jacobs, who joined the Doughboys for their fourth review of Taco Bell. Premiering on May 21, 2015, as part of the Feral Audio network, Doughboys transitioned to Headgum in April 2018 following the shutdown of its previous provider. As of March 2025 the Doughboys Patreon account is the 18th most popular among podcast Patreons, with over 13,000 patrons.

Brian Reinhart of The Dallas Observer lauded the mix of humor and food criticism evident in the podcast, describing Mitchell and Wiger as "Americas funniest food critics".

==== Dynamic Banter ====
Hosts and friends, Mike Falzone and Steve Zaragoza tackle a different topic each week and – once monthly – present a movie commentary episode labelled "The Commentarium". Dynamic Banter is a continuation of the hosts prior podcast, Cloverfeels, and debuted on May 5, 2016 – reaching 150 episodes in April 2019.

==== Exploration: LIVE! ====
Charlie Bardey and Natalie Rotter-Laitman explore some of the most (and least) pressing ideas, theories, axioms, and concepts out there.

==== Get Played ====
Formerly known as How Did This Get Played?, Get Played sees Nick Wiger, Heather Anne Campbell and Matt Apodaca discussing and reviewing video games.

==== Girls On Porn ====
Girls on Porn is a porn review podcast hosted by Rachel Napoleon and Laura Ramadei. Each week, they research and review porn based on popular search terms. The podcast was launched March 6, 2019.

==== Good Christian Fun ====
Kevin T. Porter and Caroline Ely explore the world of Christian pop culture. Good Christian Fun premiered on August 30, 2017.

==== Good One: A Podcast About Jokes ====
Host Jesse David Fox, Vulture.com Senior Editor, and a comedian guest discuss a famous joke of their choice. The podcast has featured episodes with Kevin Hart, Ray Romano, Nick Kroll, Will Forte, Bo Burnham, Jimmy Fallon, John Mulaney, Jerry Seinfeld, and Weird Al Yankovic. Good One, a joint project with Vulture, premiered on February 13, 2017.

==== Hey Riddle Riddle ====
On Hey Riddle Riddle, improv artists Adal Rifai, Erin Keif, and John Patrick Coan attempt to solve riddles, puzzles, and whodunits while discussing and dissecting them along the way. The podcast debuted on July 25, 2018, and has since drawn praise from Forbes, Observer and The Irish Times, in which it was lauded as being "high octane and hilarious".

==== Hollywood Handbook ====
Hollywood Handbook is a weekly comedy podcast hosted by Hayes Davenport and Sean Clements. Started in 2013, the podcast joined the Headgum network in May 2023, with episode 501 being the first episode released as part of the network.

==== Lackluster Video ====
Actors Finn Wolfhard and Billy Bryk host this podcast discussing and dissecting their favorite movies and movies that do not exist. Lackluster Video first aired on September 9, 2020.

==== Newcomers ====
Hosts Lauren Lapkus and Nicole Byer watch films and television series from franchises that they both have little to no experience with and discuss their feelings. Newcomers debuted on January 28, 2020, with the first season focusing on the Star Wars franchise. Subsequent seasons have focused on The Lord of the Rings (and other works of Middle-earth in film), the works of Tyler Perry, the Fast & Furious franchise (Byer with guest co-host Jon Gabrus), the MCU, Batman films, the works of Martin Scorsese, and iconic sports movies.

==== No Joke ====
Each episode, Harvard Sailing Team members and comedians Billy Scafuri and Adam Lustick discuss their history and relationship with a single topic. No Joke debuted on February 5, 2016.

==== Not Another D&D Podcast ====
CollegeHumor alumni Brian K. Murphy, Emily Axford, Jake Hurwitz and Caldwell Tanner present this Dungeons & Dragons actual play podcast. The first main campaign follows the adventures of "the Band of Boobs" – composed of Axford, Hurwitz, and Tanner's respective characters: Moonshine Cybin, a Crick elf druid; Hardwon Surefoot, a human fighter raised by dwarves; and Beverly Toegold V, a teenaged halfling paladin. Murphy serves as the Dungeon Master for the campaign, which frequently features guest appearances.

Not Another D&D Podcast, or "NADDPod", has amassed over 20,000 patrons for the show's Patreon account.

The podcast premiered on February 2, 2018, and reached episode 100 concluding its first major campaign on May 10, 2020. Its second major campaign premiered on October 16, 2020 and concluded after 41 episodes on November 21, 2021. The group, who are affectionately referred to as 2-Crew, are currently on their third major campaign, premiering February 10, 2022, and concluded after 72 episodes on December 22, 2024.

==== Overdue ====
Hosts Craig Getting and Andrew Cunningham host this podcast about notable literature. Each week, Craig and Andrew discuss a book in their backlog. Overdue premiered on February 11, 2013, and on July 17, 2023, reached its 600th episode.

==== Perfect Person ====
Miles Bonsignore and other guests or as Bonsignore calls them, "freelance associate sidekicks" host this comedy advice show. Each week, Bonsignore and his guests answer audience calls, solve their problems, and help listeners achieve maximum perfection.

==== Podcast But Outside ====
Created by Andrew Michaan and Cole Hersch, Podcast But Outside is a comedy podcast where strangers are interviewed on the street. It was launched in April 2019 and premiered on the Headgum network on December 4, 2024.

==== Robot Congress ====
Ryan "Video Game Attorney" Morrison, Austin Hoffman, and Ali Rothman, analyze and discuss topics around the intersection of law and technology. As of March 9, 2019, the podcast has released 81 episodes.

==== Rude Tales of Magic ====
Branson Reese and his jester's retinue, Christopher Hastings, Carly Monardo, Tim Platt, Joe Lepore, and Ali Fisher, travel through the world of Cordelia.

==== Seek Treatment ====
Comedians Catherine Cohen and Pat Regan discuss dating, sex, and pop culture on a weekly basis. Seek Treatment (sometimes formatted as Seek Treatment with Cat & Pat) premiered on the Forever Dog podcast network, on July 24, 2018. The first Headgum-produced episode of Seek Treatment was released on January 16, 2024. Since relaunching under the Headgum network, Seek Treatment has featured guests such as Dylan Mulvaney, Robby Hoffman, and Kate Berlant.

==== SitcomD&D ====
Erin Keif, Waleed Mansour, Elizabeth Andrews, Sean Coyle, and Ben Briggs star in a weekly podcast which blends sitcoms with Dungeons & Dragons. SitcomD&D premiered on February 15, 2022.

==== Too Scary; Didn't Watch ====
The horror movie recap podcast for those too scared to watch for themselves. In this weekly podcast Emily Gonzalez, Henley Cox, and Sammy Smart recap and discuss popular horror movies. Released on August 14, 2019.

==== The Baby-Sitters Club Club ====
Jack Shepherd and Tanner Greenring go through and discuss Ann M. Martin's The Baby-Sitters Club novels. The Baby-Sitters Club Club debuted on February 23, 2016.

==== The Complete Guide to Everything ====
The Complete Guide to Everything is a weekly podcast that delves in to a wide array of topics, driven by hosts Tom Reynolds and Tim Daniels' quests to make the world a more informed place. The podcast aired its 500th episode on January 14, 2019.

==== The Dumbbells ====
Erin McGowan-Saenz and Ryan Stanger host this comedic fitness-themed podcast. The Dumbbells premiered on October 26, 2016, and reached 125 episodes on March 20, 2019.

==== The Easy Chair ====
Author Laura Hurwitz – with occasional guests – hosts this podcast which features weekly readings of short stories. The Easy Chair reached its 175th episode on December 11, 2018.

==== The Headgum Podcast ====
Host Geoffrey James waxes nonsensical with a rotating cast of his coworkers reluctantly serving as guests. 197 episodes have aired since the show's debut on May 13, 2020.

==== The Jeff Rubin Jeff Rubin Show ====
Jeff Rubin interviews creative people who have pursued careers based on their personal interests. The Jeff Rubin Jeff Rubin Show debuted on March 8, 2013, and has featured appearances from R.L. Stine, Pete Holmes, and Chris Gethard.

==== Three Black Halflings ====
Hosts Jasper William Cartwright, Jeremy Cobb, and Liv Kennedy host discussions on the intersection of black culture and table-top role playing games such as Dungeons & Dragons. This variety show includes actual play campaigns, interviews, gameplay tips and discussion of Black experience within nerd culture. The show has produced 138 episodes and was announced as part of the Headgum network by episode 47.

==== Twinnovation ====
Each episode identical twins Dave and Jeff Rosenberg (CollegeHumor/Funny Or Die alum) alongside Queen Ana Merida, comically design get-rich-quick schemes and inventions. Marc Heshon of Huffington Post has written of the podcast that "the ideas [are] all pretty bad, but ... the explaining of them is pretty damn funny". Twinnovation debuted on July 30, 2015, and was featured at the 35th annual Just for Laughs festival. They have joined HeadGum for shows at SXSW as well as Chicago, Brooklyn and NYC. As of May 6, 2019, host Mike Karnell (mama bear) is no longer a member of the Twinnovation Podcast.

==== We Hate Movies ====
Each week, Andrew Jupin, Stephen Sajdak, Eric Szyszka and Chris Cabin force themselves to watch and review infamous movies and box-office flops. We Hate Movies has aired over 558 episodes in its primary format as of July 2021. There are also hundreds of bonus Patreon episodes which cover various TV shows such as Melrose Place; Beverly Hills, 90210; and Star Trek; as well as full length commentaries for films.

==== We Watch Wrestling ====
Standup comedians Matt McCarthy and Vince Averill host this wrestling-centric podcast which premiered in 2013.

==== What The Tuck? A RuPaul's Drag Race Podcast ====
A joint project between Headgum and Vulture.com, What the Tuck? A RuPaul's Drag Race Podcast is dedicated to the recapping of weekly RuPaul's Drag Race episodes. Hosts Nicole Byer and Joel Kim Booster reacted to RuPaul's Drag Race All Stars (season 4) in the first season of the podcast. Mano Agapion and Matt Rogers took over the hosting duties for the second season of the podcast, in which they discuss RuPaul's Drag Race (season 11). What The Tuck? was launched on December 17, 2018.

==== Why Won't You Date Me? ====
Why Won't You Date Me? is a quest to find why host Nicole Byer is perpetually single, exploring topics relating to love, life and sex along the way. The podcast premiered on December 1, 2017, and has featured appearances from Sasheer Zamata, Jameela Jamil, and Trixie Mattel. Why Won't You Date Me has been described as "a hilarious chronicle of [Nicole Byer's] dating life as she connects her own struggles to the bigger issues within the dating world", and was awarded 'Outstanding Foreign Series' at the 2019 Canadian Podcasting Awards. In January 2021, Deadline reported that the podcast had been acquired by Conan O'Brien's Team Coco podcast banner. In November 2024, Why Won't You Date Me? returned to Headgum.

=== Retired programs ===
==== 2 Jews Talking ====
Josh Heller and Erika Brooks Adickman analyze pop culture, gender, politics, and life, from a Jewish standpoint. 2 Jews Talking premiered on April 4, 2016, and was retired after 90 episodes on February 5, 2019.

==== 8-Bit Book Club ====
Hosts Brian Murphy, Emily Axford, and Caldwell Tanner discuss video game novels. 8-Bit Book Club debuted on September 27, 2016, and aired its final episode on April 2, 2018. The program still runs periodically on Not Another DnD Podcast, sometimes as Adventure Book Theatre.

==== Black Girls Talking ====
Hosts Alesia, Fatima, Aurelia, and Ramou provide their opinions on a diverse range of topics, with specific attention to the perspective and representation of people of color. Black Girls Talking ended on October 13, 2016.

==== Cloverfeels ====
Mike Falzone and Steve Zaragoza review and analyze the Cloverfield movie franchise. Cloverfeels aired its last episode on August 16, 2017; becoming a segment on Falzone and Zaragoza's Dynamic Banter! podcast.

==== Come Out, Come Out ====
Each episode, host Mo Welch invites a guest onto the podcast to talk about their experience with coming out. Come Out, Come Out was retired on September 15, 2017.

==== Coupla Questions ====
Hosts Dannielle & Claire interview their favorite couples about how they fell in love and how they stayed in love. Coupla Question ended on July 19, 2016.

==== Dead Eyes ====
Actor and comedian Connor Ratliff tries to solve a "very stupid mystery": after being cast for a small role in an episode of HBO's Band of Brothers directed by Tom Hanks, the latter reportedly said he had "dead eyes" and had him fired. This leads Ratliff to discuss various aspects of working in show-business with his guests. The 31st and last episode of Dead Eyes aired on October 3, 2022, with Ratliff interviewing Tom Hanks.

==== Don't Get Me Started ====
Will Hines and Anthony King talk to talented people about what they love–rather than about their work. Don't Get Me Started has featured appearances from Jason Mantzoukas, D'Arcy Carden, and Matt Walsh. The podcast concluded – after running for almost 3 years – on August 22, 2017.

==== Doodie Calls with Doug Mand ====
Comedian and writer Doug Mand talks to guests about their most embarrassing bathroom moments and other awkward experiences. Past guests on the podcast include Phil Lord, Rachel Bloom, and Bob Saget. Doodie Calls ran for over 6 years; ending on June 28, 2018.

==== Food is the New Rock ====
Zach Brooks talks music with a chef, or food with a musician. The podcast has featured guest appearances from a wide array of talents including the likes of: Kiernan Shipka; Moby; Steve Aoki; Paul Stanley; Kelis; The Wombats; Jason Lee; Wolfgang Puck; Doug Benson; Questlove; Alt-J; Portugal. The Man; Harley Morenstein; Eddie Huang; Jon Favreau; Fall Out Boy; Curtis Stone; Tenacious D; Rachael Ray; and Action Bronson. The podcast concluded on August 31, 2016, with its 200th episode.

==== Gilmore Guys ====
Veteran fan Kevin T. Porter and show newcomer Demi Adejuyigbe provide an episode-by-episode analysis of Gilmore Girls. Gilmore Guys premiered on October 1, 2014, and featured appearances from comedian guests, such as Retta and Lauren Lapkus, as well as actors from the show, such as Lauren Graham and Milo Ventimiglia. The original release concluded on June 3, 2017, and was succeeded by the hosts reviewing Bunheads, and then The Marvelous Mrs. Maisel from 2018 to 2020, for which Alice Wetterlund replaced Adejuyigbe as a host of the podcast.

==== Headgum Fantasy Basketball League ====
A podcast documenting the Headgum Fantasy Basketball League, where members appear on the show to discuss their thoughts and actions. The podcast ended on January 17, 2017.

==== Headgum Fantasy Football League ====
A podcast documenting the Headgum Fantasy Football League, where members appear on the show to discuss their thoughts and actions. After 35 episodes, the podcast ended on June 1, 2017.

==== High and Mighty ====
Jon Gabrus hosts this podcast where he invites celebrities and friends on to discuss a different topic each episode. Past guests include Paul Scheer, Adam Pally, and Bobby Moynihan. High and Mighty premiered on July 30, 2015, and the podcast concluded on January 23, 2025, with its 500th episode.

==== I Feel Ya ====
Hosts Katie Hilliard and Elaine Carroll present this podcast intended around cultivating empathy. I Feel Ya was retired on December 11, 2017.

==== If I Were You ====
Headgum co-founders Jake and Amir hosted this flagship comedy advice podcast, which ran from May 10, 2013, to April 24, 2023. The podcast featured numerous recurring guest appearances; such as Ben Schwartz, who has guested 16 times; Thomas Middleditch, who has guested 10 times; Hoodie Allen, who has guested 4 times; and Allison Williams, who has guested 4 times. On September 16, 2019, the podcast aired its 400th episode. The show ended after 589 episodes on April 24, 2023.

Sam Tabachnik of The Washington Post has written of If I Were You that it exemplifies how Jake and Amir "have their fingers firmly on the pulse of the digital comedy scene", while Kayla Culver of The Concordian likened the podcast to "listening to two best friends having a hilarious conversation on the couch next to you".

==== I'm Still Right ====
Luke Kelly-Clyne hosts two guests who engage in longstanding debates of theirs. I'm Still Right concluded on February 14, 2019.

==== It Feels like the First Time ====
Steve Zaragoza, Owen Carter, and Brett Register rewatch TV shows and movies. It Feels like the First Time was retired after 78 episodes, on November 13, 2018.

==== Just a Tip with Megan Batoon ====
Megan Batoon hosted this advice podcast. Just a Tip first aired on March 30, 2018, and concluded on February 4, 2022.

==== Lady Lovin' ====
Jilly Hendrix, Greta Titelman, and Lo Bosworth discuss all things female empowerment, from romance, to health, to entrepreneurship. The show premiered on August 17, 2015, and was retired on December 31, 2018, after 169 episodes.

==== Let's Talk About Me, Baby ====
Actor and musician Utkarsh Ambudkar sits down with friends and relatives to discuss his life and career. The podcast featured appearances by Lin-Manuel Miranda, Randall Park, Joe Manganiello, Hasan Minhaj, and Rachael Leigh Cook. After 54 episodes, Let's Talk About Me, Baby was retired on September 6, 2017.

==== Make Me Like It ====
Guests attempt to convince hosts Kelly Hudson and Dan Klein to like things that they currently do not. Guests who appeared on Make Me Like It include Paul F. Tompkins, Paul Scheer, and Horatio Sanz. The podcast premiered on April 7, 2016, with the 90th, and last, episode airing on October 25, 2018.

==== Punch Up the Jam ====
Each week, comedian and musician Miel Bredouw reviewed a popular song segment by segment before presenting a "punch-up" that comedically "improves" the song in question. Punch Up the Jam has featured appearances from Griffin McElroy, for the punch-up of "Send Me on My Way"; Mara Wilson, for the punch-up of "Semi-Charmed Life"; and Grace Helbig, for the punch-up of "Welcome to the Jungle". The podcast premiered on December 21, 2017, originally with Bredouw and Demi Adejuyigbe as the show's co-hosts. Punch Up the Jam has received praise from numerous outlets, including Metro; Vulture.com; and Pitchfork.

On the July 4, 2019, episode of the podcast, Adejuyigbe announced that he would no longer be involved with the show. Bredouw continued the show as its sole host. Throughout most of 2020, Breouw co-hosted the show with Chris Fleming. The podcast was also expanded to feature contributions from musician and music theorist Rob Moose, which was referred to as the show's "weatherman" segment. The final episode of the show with Bredouw hosting was posted in December 2020. A year later, the podcast format was revived by Headgum with Andrew and Evan Gregory of the Gregory Brothers as hosts. The Gregorys hosted the show until December 2022, when the show was again retired.

==== Review Revue ====
A weekly show hosted by Reilly Anspaugh and Alfred Bardwell-Evans (2020-2022: Geoffrey James) that blends conversation and improv comedy based on the most absurd reviews on the internet. Guests have included Jeff Probst talking about Sandals Resorts, Ryan Gaul talking about haunted houses, and Finn Wolfhard talking about indoor trampoline parks. Review Revue first aired on January 13, 2020, and its final episode was released on December 24, 2024. The show has received positive reviews from outlets such as Vulture.com.

==== Shock and Awesome ====
Chris "Shockwave" Sullivan interviews comedians and musicians to understand their creative inspirations. Features on the show include Lin-Manuel Miranda and Wayne Brady. The show was retired on April 20, 2018.

==== That Was Us ====
Every episode, a guest joins Julia Nunes and shares an embarrassing anecdote of who they used to be. The final episode of That Was Us aired on April 21, 2017.

==== The Coe Show ====
Former ESPN radio personality Tyler Coe hosts this sport-related podcast. It was retired on November 5, 2016.

==== The Earthling's Podcast ====
William Haynes, Yessica Hernandez Cruz and John Ros host this comedic discussion podcast. The Earthling's Podcast premiered on April 3, 2017, and was retired on February 19, 2018.

==== The Mindhouse Project ====
Host Josh Ruben and guests discuss a wide variety of topics. Guests who appeared on The Mindhouse Project include Thomas Middleditch, Patrick Wilson, and Matt McGorry. The podcast was retired on September 19, 2017.

==== The Pit Wall ====
Headgum staff members/racing enthusiasts Casey Donahue, Marika Brownlee, Andrew Pile, Jake Hurwitz and Geoffrey James host this "F1 Podcast for the casual fan". Each episode, the gang discusses either the most recent Formula One race or a racing-related piece of media. The Pit Wall premiered on August 29, 2022, and ended on December 11, 2024.

==== This Is Why ====
On This Is Why (formerly This Is Why You're Single), Laura Lane and Angela Spera analyze and explain real-life dating disasters. This Is Why premiered on July 30, 2015, and its final episode was released on August 11, 2021.

Tig and Cheryl: True Story

Hosts Tig Notaro and Cheryl Hines discuss documentary films every week. Tig and Cheryl: True Story premiered on September 14, 2020. The podcast ended on December 18, 2023 after a falling out between the hosts.

==== What Did I Miss ====
A current events podcast, hosted by comedians Susanna Wolff and Siobhan Thompson. What Did I Miss was retired on December 16, 2016.

==== What Should We Draw? ====
Illustrators Caldwell Tanner and Nathan Yaffe take inspiration from their conversation to design a drawing, publishing the finished drawings to their Tumblr of the same name. The podcast debuted on February 22, 2016, and was retired on March 14, 2018, after 75 episodes.

==== XOXO, Gossip Kings ====
Seasoned television writers Carl Tart and Lamar Woods share their comedic takes and industry knowledge on each episode of the classic teen television show Gossip Girl in order. With Lamar walking Carl through the series for Carl's first watch-through, the program XOXO, Gossip Kings premiered on November 12, 2021 and ended on March 22, 2024.

== Videos ==
The Headgum YouTube channel was launched on February 8, 2016. The channel features uploads of filmed podcast episodes, IRL videos, and livestreams, as well as three original comedy series featuring Headgum employees and occasionally podcast hosts; Geoffrey the Dumbass, Off Days, and Day in the Strife. As of December 2022, the channel has amassed over 52,000 subscribers and 24 million views.

== Headgum Live! ==
In addition to their podcasting and YouTube releases, Headgum has also presented multiple live shows. Headgum Live! is described as "a night of improv, sketch, stand-up, and more featuring the staff, podcasters, and friends of the Headgum podcast network". The shows have been performed at the UCB and Hayworth theatres in Los Angeles, as well as in Montreal at the Just for Laughs 2017 festival, and in Austin, at SXSW in 2016, 2017, and 2018.
