= Emily Axford =

American actress, writer and producer

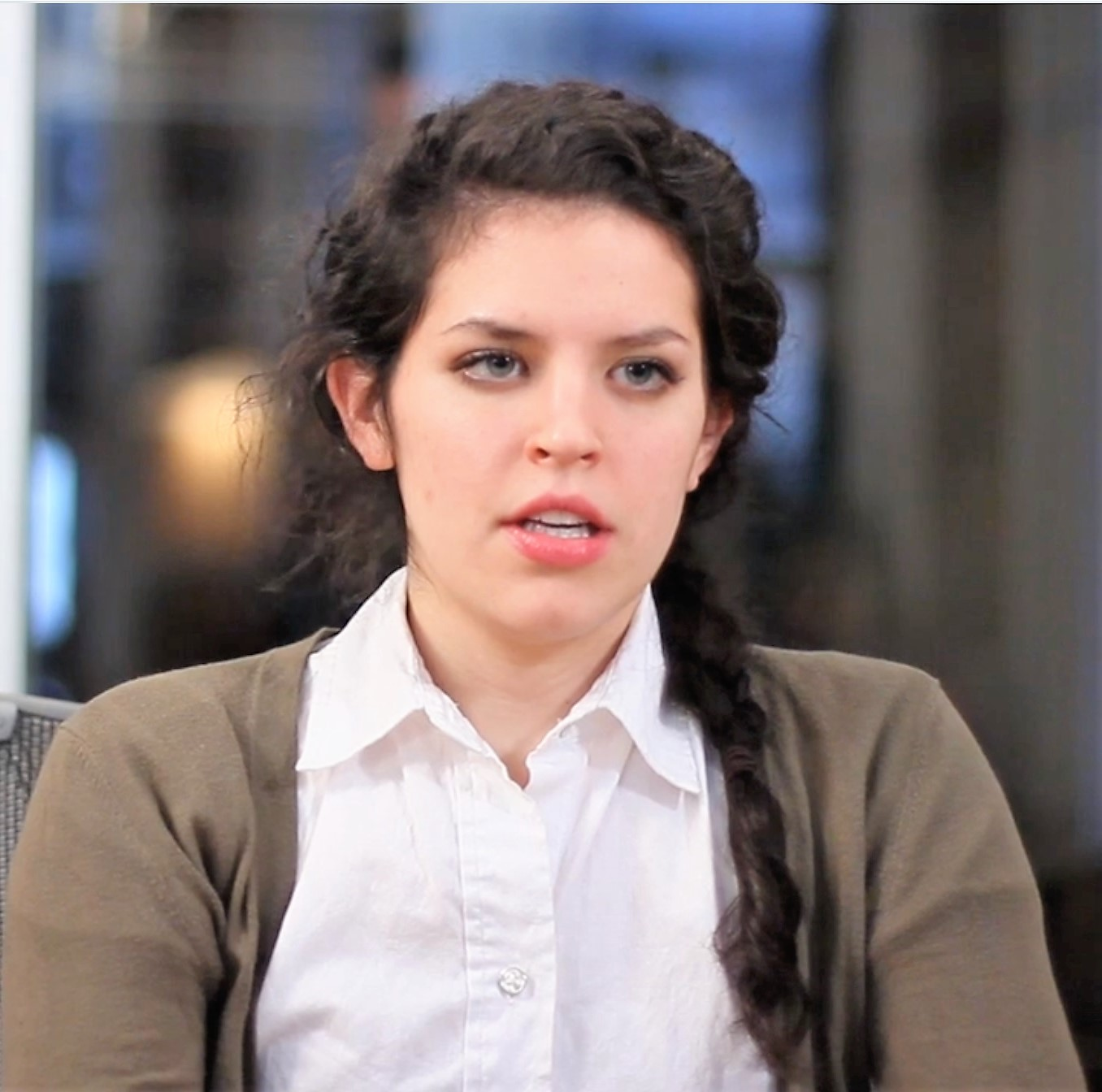
- Axford in A Totally Unreasonable Will (2012)
- Education: George Washington University (BA)
- Occupations: Actress; writer; composer; producer
- Years active: 2009–present
- Known for: Adam Ruins Everything; Hot Date; Not Another D&D Podcast; Dimension 20; Critical Role
- Spouse: Brian K. Murphy (m. 2014)

Emily Axford is an American actress, writer, composer, and producer. She is best known for her various roles in CollegeHumor videos, her role as Emily on the truTV comedy Adam Ruins Everything, and for her role on the Pop original Hot Date.

== Early life and education ==
Axford grew up in the suburbs of Albany, New York. She attended Bethlehem Central High School, just south of Albany. She earned a Bachelor of Arts degree in religion from George Washington University in 2007. At GWU, she was a part of the co-ed improv troupe called ReceSs. After college, Axford studied at the Upright Citizens Brigade in New York City and then Los Angeles, where she first ventured into internet sketch comedy.

== Career ==
From 2011 to 2017, Axford was a writer and actress for digital comedy company CollegeHumor. In 2017, Axford transitioned to working as an executive producer and actress on the Pop show Hot Date, which had begun as a web series for CollegeHumor, alongside her husband Brian Murphy. From 2015 to 2019, Axford co-starred in both the College Humor and TruTV iterations of Adam Ruins Everything.

Axford and Murphy co-wrote HEY, U UP? (For a Serious Relationship): How to Turn Your Booty Call into Your Emergency Contact, a satirical relationship advice book that was published in 2018. She and Murphy have, in conjunction with Caldwell Tanner, hosted 8-Bit Book Club (2016–2018), a podcast in which they read and discussed video game novels.

Axford participates in a variety of actual play web series where she plays tabletop role-playing games. She is a player and occasional gamemaster in the HeadGum podcast Not Another D&D Podcast with Murphy, Tanner, and Jake Hurwitz. Axford is a primary cast member of Dimension 20, an actual play anthology web series created in 2018 by CollegeHumor for the streaming service Dropout, and Dimension 20's talk-back show Adventuring Party. She has starred as a variety of characters between the two shows' several campaigns, most of which utilize Dungeons & Dragons 5th Edition. In 2023, Axford appeared as a guest player in the third campaign of Critical Role.

== Personal life ==
Axford is married to Brian K. Murphy, whom she met while working together at CollegeHumor in the early 2010s. The couple has collaborated on several different projects, including satirizations of their own relationship. They currently reside in Los Angeles, California.

== Filmography ==
=== Television ===
| Year | Title | Role | Notes |
|---|---|---|---|
| 2009 | Nice Brothers | Emily | 2 episodes |
| 2013 | BearShark | Beverly | Episode: "Love" |
| 2013 | Inside Amy Schumer | Liz | Episode: "Sex Tips" |
| 2014 | Love's a Bitch | Tatiana | Episode: "The Truce" |
| 2015–2019 | Adam Ruins Everything | Emily, various roles | 27 episodes |
| 2017–2019 | Hot Date | Emily | 20 episodes |
| 2019 | Tuca & Bertie | Realtor | 2 episodes |
| 2021 | Generation | Dominique | Episode: "The High Priestess" |

=== Web ===
| Year | Title | | Role | Notes |
|---|---|---|---|---|
| 2009–2013 | UCB Comedy Originals | | Various roles | 10 episodes |
| 2011–2018 | CollegeHumor Originals | | Various roles | 172 episodes |
| 2012–2015 | Hardly Working | | Various roles | 39 episodes |
| 2012–2018 | Dorkly Originals | | Various roles | 55 episodes |
| 2012 | Jake and Amir | | Emily | 6 episodes |
| 2013 | Very Mary-Kate | | Writer | Episode: "Instagram" |
| 2016 | Bad Internet | | Naomi | Episode: "The Year-Long Ad Experience" |
| 2018–present | Not Another D&D Podcast | The Moonstone Saga | Moonshine Cybin | Main cast and primary composer |
| 2018–present | Not Another D&D Podcast | The Mavrus Chronicles | Gamemaster | Main cast and primary composer |
| 2018–present | Not Another D&D Podcast | Trinyvale | Onyx Lumiere | Main cast and primary composer |
| 2018–present | Not Another D&D Podcast | Campaign 2 | Fia Boginya; Tarragon Snakeroot; Brimstone Billie | Main cast and primary composer |
| 2018–present | Not Another D&D Podcast | Campaign 3 | Calliope Petrichor | Main cast and primary composer |
| 2018–present | Not Another D&D Podcast | Twilight Sanctorum | Gamemaster | Main cast and primary composer |
| 2018–present | Dimension 20 | Fantasy High | Fig Faeth | Main cast |
| 2018–present | Dimension 20 | The Unsleeping City | Sofia Bicicleta | Main cast |
| 2018–present | Dimension 20 | Fantasy High: Sophomore Year | Fig Faeth | Main cast |
| 2018–present | Dimension 20 | A Crown of Candy | Princess Jet Rocks; Queen Saccharina of House Frostwhip | Main role |
| 2018–present | Dimension 20 | The Unsleeping City: Chapter II | Sofia Bicicleta | Main cast |
| 2018–present | Dimension 20 | A Starstruck Odyssey | Sundry Sidney | Main role |
| 2018–present | Dimension 20 | A Court of Fey and Flowers | Lady Chirp Featherfowl | Main role |
| 2018–present | Dimension 20 | Neverafter | Ylfa Snorgelsson | Main role |
| 2018–present | Dimension 20 | Fantasy High: Junior Year | Fig Faeth | Main role |
| 2018–present | Dimension 20 | Cloudward, Ho! | Marya Junková | Main role |
| 2018–present | Dimension 20 | City Council of Darkness | Vesper Childers | Main role |
| 2023 | Critical Role | Campaign three: Bell's Hells | Prism | Guest role; 6 episodes |
| 2023 | Critical Role | One-shots | Babson | Episode: "Lookout, Here We Come!" |

=== Video games ===
| Year | Title | Role | Notes |
|---|---|---|---|
| 2022 | The Quarry | Grace | |
| 2025 | Date Everything! | Sam | |
