= Alison Becker =

American actress and television writer

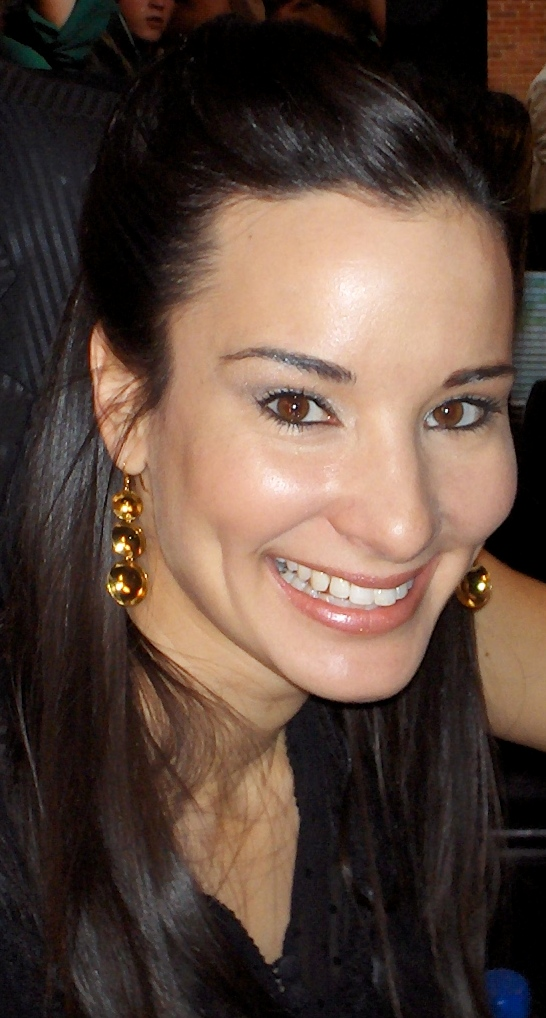
- Becker in 2006
- Education: Georgetown University (BA)
- Occupations: Actress, television writer
- Years active: 2003–present

Alison Becker is an American actress and television writer. She is best known for appearing in NBC's Parks and Recreation.

== Early life ==
Becker grew up in Allamuchy Township, New Jersey. She attended Georgetown University in Washington, D.C.

== Career ==
Becker is a regular player at the Upright Citizens Brigade improv theatre. She has also performed for Hopscotch: A New York Sex Comedy, Caroline's on Broadway, and other comedy clubs. She starred on Boiling Points, the MTV prank television show. She was a VJ on the music video TV channel Fuse, where she hosted F-List and some other shows. She was the host of VH1's Top 20 Video Countdown. She is on the online show Mayne Street with ESPN broadcaster Kenny Mayne on ESPN. She was a co-host on the FuelTV talk show The Daily Habit and had a recurring role on NBC's Parks and Recreation, appearing in all seven seasons as local newspaper reporter Shauna Malwae-Tweep. She appeared once on HBO's Curb Your Enthusiasm in the ninth season as a yoga instructor. She also appeared in the CollegeHumor "Badman" Batman spoof videos and a "If Google Was a Guy" sketch. She also appeared in commercials for Dairy Queen (featuring chicken and waffles), for the Chrysler Pacifica hybrid, and for Realtor.com.

== Filmography ==
=== Film ===
Year	Title	Role	Notes
2003	Pushing Tom	Artist	
2004	Four Dead Batteries	Shea	
2006	Double Down	The Cheating Wife	
2006	Premium	Amanda	
2006	God-Links	Betty	
2007	Arranged	Beth	
2009	May the Best Man Win	Sarah Freeman	
2010	The Other Guys	Financial News Anchor	
2011	The Bungalow	Mandy	Short film
2012	Call Me Maybe Not		Short film
2014	The Wedding Pact	Date #3	
2015	Spare Change	Ms. Walter	
2019	Control		Short film
2020	Class Action Park		
2022	The Hostage	Mean Joey	Short film

=== Television ===
Year	Title	Role	Notes
2004	Boiling Points		
2004	Popping the Question with Star Jones		
2004	Comedy Academy		
2004	AV Squad		
2004	Cavalcade of Personalities	Loretta Davies	Short
2004	Jump Cuts	Alfafa	Episode: "Season 1 Episode 2"
2005	40 Greatest Pranks		
2006	Project This, Bitch		
2006	Law & Order: Special Victims Unit	Angel's Owner	Episode: "Taboo"
2006	Fuse: The Nighttime Clap		
2006	Fuse: F-List		
2006	The P.A.		
2007	Starveillance		
2007	Human Giant	Various characters	4 episodes
2007	Law & Order: Criminal Intent		
2008	Z Rock		
2008	VH1 Top 20 Video Countdown	Host	
2008	Mayne Street		
2009–2015	Parks and Recreation	Shauna Malwae-Tweep	Recurring role, 14 episodes
2010	The League	Darcy	Episode: "Ghost Monkey"
2010	Nick Swardson's Pretend Time		
2010	Rules of Engagement		
2011	Californication	UTK Rep	Episode: "Exile on Main Street"
2012	Dating Rules From My Future Self	Kelcy	9 episodes
2012	The Newsroom	Sandy Whiddles	Episodes: "The Blackout Part I: Tragedy Porn", "The Blackout Part II: Mock Debate"
2013-2015	Kroll Show	Tour Guide/Pretend Lesbian	3 episodes
2013-2015	Newsreaders	Xandra Dent	3 episodes
2014	New Girl	Pearl	Episode: "Thanksgiving IV"
2015	Adam Ruins Everything	Liz Cormack	Episode: "Adam Ruins Forensics Science"
2017	Lucifer	Madison	Episode: "Deceptive Little Parasite"
2017	I'm Sorry	Salesperson	Episode: "Goddess Party"
2017	Curb Your Enthusiasm	Yogi Tina	Episode: "Namaste"
2017	Hot Date	Libby	Episode: "For Real, Where Have All My Friends Gone?"
2018	Best.Worst.Weekend.Ever.	Zed's Mom	Episode: "Issue 1"
2018	LA to Vegas	Caroline	Recurring role, 2 episodes
2019	The Unicorn	Alicia	Episode: "Three Men Out"
2022	Murderville	Deb Melton	Episode: "The Magician's Assistant"
2022	Star Trek: Lower Decks	Victoria Nuzé (voice)	Episode: "Trusted Sources"
2023	Unstable	Allison Davis	

=== Online appearances ===
Year	Title	Role	Notes
2008-2009	Mayne Street	Sarah Morton	
2012–2015	CollegeHumor	Siri, Rachel Dawes, Miranda/Talia al-Ghul	4 episodes
