= Why Won't You Date Me? =

Podcast hosted by Nicole Byer

- Genre: Comedy
- Language: English

Cast and voices
- Hosted by: Nicole Byer

Production
- Length: 40–80 minutes

Publication
- Original release: December 1, 2017
- Provider: HeadGum (2017-2021); Team Coco (2021-2024); HeadGum (2024-present)
- Updates: Weekly (Friday)

Related
- Website: teamcoco.com/podcasts/why-wont-you-date-me-with-nicole-byer

Why Won't You Date Me? is a comedy and relationship podcast hosted by Nicole Byer which debuted on December 1, 2017 on the HeadGum network. The podcast features Byer and a guest exploring why she is single, while discussing topics related to love, life, and sex. The podcast was a part of the Team Coco network starting with the January 15, 2021 episode with Conan O'Brien. In November, 2024 the podcast returned to HeadGum and also started a YouTube channel.

== Content ==
The format of an episode typically involves Byer introducing her guest/s, as they then talk about their respective experiences with sex, dating, relationships, and love. In most episodes, the guest will critique Byer's online dating profiles, before closing the episode by discussing whether or not they would date her - and why.

While the featured guest is often another comedian, Byer has also hosted former partners, as well as her own childhood friends. Notable guests who have appeared on Why Won't You Date Me? include Sasheer Zamata, Rachel Bloom, Jameela Jamil, Joel Kim Booster, Vicky Vox, and Trixie Mattel.

== Reception ==
In 2018, Why Won't You Date Me? was labelled by The Daily Dot's John-Michael Bond as one of the 20 best podcasts on Spotify, with Bond regarding the podcast as "a cathartic romp through the hellscape of modern dating, led by a joyful host who never lets the darkness win." Jillian Selzer of Insider described the podcast as "a hilarious chronicle of (Nicole Byer's) dating life as she connects her own struggles to the bigger issues within the dating world," further writing that "Byer's personality is loud, outgoing, and wildly entertaining," while Elite Daily's Annie Foskett recommended the podcast as a "must-listen," praising Byer's transparency about her dating life as being "extremely refreshing."

In 2019, Why Won't You Date Me? won Outstanding Foreign Series at the Canadian Podcasting Awards, which is "awarded to a breakthrough show – across any format and category – produced outside of Canada." In 2021, Why Won't you Date Me? won the Best Overall Host – Female iHeartMedia Podcast Award. In 2023, it won best comedy podcast in the Ambies Awards.

Becca James, writing for Vulture in 2019, called the show "one of the most forthcoming and funny podcasts around, and [the live episode with guest Vicky Vox] offers a perfect introduction by getting to the gist, which goes beyond the titular question and into the hilarious depths of human connection."
