= Brian K. Murphy =

American actor, producer, and writer (born 1985)

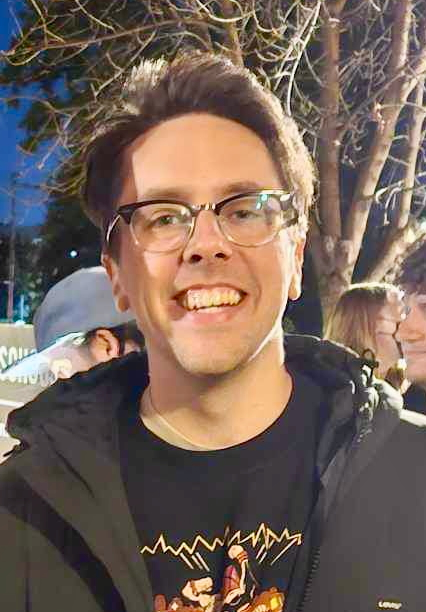
- Murphy in 2023
- Born: October 3, 1985 (age 40)
- Education: Rowan University
- Occupations: Actor; producer; writer
- Years active: 2006–present
- Known for: Performing in Adam Ruins Everything, Hot Date, Not Another D&D Podcast, Dimension 20
- Spouse: Emily Axford (m. 2014)

Brian K. Murphy (born October 3, 1985) is an American actor, producer, and writer. He is best known for his various roles in CollegeHumor videos, his role as Murph on truTV comedy original Adam Ruins Everything, and his role on the Pop original Hot Date, co-starring with his wife Emily Axford.

== Early life and education ==
Murphy was born on October 3, 1985, and grew up in New Jersey. He studied at Rowan University, where he dual majored in film and journalism.

== Career ==
From 2010 to 2017, Murphy was an actor and writer for CollegeHumor. In 2015, he hosted Middle of the Night Show, a late-night television series on MTV. Murphy played the role of "Murph" in Adam Ruins Everything, in the episodes "Adam Ruins Football" (2016) and "Adam Ruins Having a Baby" (2017). In 2017, Murphy and his wife Emily Axford began working as executive producers and actors on the Pop original Hot Date. The previous incarnation of the show was a web series for CollegeHumor. The TV program's second season premiered in September 2019.

Axford and Murphy co-wrote HEY, U UP? (For a Serious Relationship): How to Turn Your Booty Call into Your Emergency Contact, a book of satirical relationship advice that was published in 2018.

Murphy was also one of the hosts of 8-Bit Book Club alongside Axford and Caldwell Tanner, a podcast where the hosts read and discuss books and other media relating to video games. Since 2018, he has been the host and Dungeon Master of the HeadGum podcast Not Another D&D Podcast with Axford, Tanner, and Jake Hurwitz. Murphy is also a player on Dimension 20, a Dungeons & Dragons actual play show from CollegeHumor's streaming service, Dropout.

== Filmography ==
=== Television ===
Year	Title	Role	Notes
2010	Improv Everywhere Originals	Stormtrooper	Episode: "Star Wars Subway Car"
2010–2015	Jake and Amir	Murph	22 episodes
2010–2017	CollegeHumor Originals	Various roles	117 episodes; also writer
2010-2018	Dorkly Originals	Various roles	134 episodes; also writer
2011–2012	Dinosaur Office	Richard / Nester	4 episodes; also writer
2012–2015	Hardly Working	Various roles	37 episodes; also writer
2013	Very Mary-Kate	Writer	Episode: "Instagram"
2015–2019	Adam Ruins Everything	Murph	20 episodes
2016	Lonely and Horny	Bryce	Episode: "Pool Party"
2016	Bad Internet	Various roles	2 episodes
2017–2019	Hot Date	Murph	20 episodes; also creator, writer, and executive producer
2018–present	Dimension 20	Various roles	129 episodes
