= Harvard Sailing Team =

New York City-based comedy group

YouTube information
- Channel: HSTSketchComedy
- Years active: 2006–present
- Genre: Sketch comedy
- Subscribers: 47.5 thousand
- Views: 17.9 million
- Last updated: April 11, 2019
- Website: harvardsailingteam.com

Harvard Sailing Team is a New York City sketch comedy group featuring 5 women and 4 men. The team performs weekly in Manhattan and their popular YouTube videos have over 16 million views. They have been featured on CBS, VH1's Best Week Ever, ComedyCentral.com, College Humor, New York Magazine's Vulture blog, Funny or Die, Andrew Sullivan's blog, The Comic's Comic, Cosmo Magazine, Jezebel, Gawker, Sesame Street and TimeOut NY.

Winners of the 2011 Nightlife award for Outstanding Comedy Group, I the Friar's Club Film Festival competition, Improvisation News 2011 INNY Award for Best in Sketch Comedy and the 2007 ECNY award for Best Sketch Comedy Group, they perform their hit live show every Friday night at The PIT. They have appeared live at Montreal Just For Laughs Festival, the Kennedy Center, Caroline's on Broadway, National College Comedy Festival, The PIT, Charleston's Piccolo Spoletto Festival, Chicago SketchFest, Toronto SketchFest, New York Comedy Festival's Best of Sketch Show, SketchFest NYC and at the UCB NY and UCB LA. They perform in argyle sweaters and Converse sneakers.

Harvard Sailing Team is Jen Curran, Clayton Early, Faryn Einhorn, Katie Larsen, Adam Lustick, Billy Scafuri, Chris Smith, Rebecca Delgado Smith and Sara Taylor. The sketch group is not affiliated in any way with Harvard University or its sailing program.

The group was founded by Chris Smith, a graduate of NYU, and Billy Scafuri, who graduated from Hofstra University, but both of whom are from Rockville Centre, New York. Not one of them attended Harvard University, and none of them sail. They first performed in Merrick, New York. Their second appearance at the Charleston Comedy Festival was named Best Return Engagement.

Individually Harvard Sailing Team members can be seen on television, in feature films, award-winning short films, and national commercials. Although they're comedians, many in the troupe are also experienced dancers, choreographers, and singers.

== Awards ==
Winner: 2011 Nightlife Award for Outstanding Comedy Duo or Group.

Winner: 2010 Friars Club Film Festival Competition.

Winner: 2011 Improvisation News INNY Award for Best in Sketch Comedy

Winner: 2007 Emerging Comics of New York Award for Best Sketch Comedy Group.
