= Siobhan Thompson =

British writer and comedian (born 1984)

- Born: Anna Siobhan Thompson; 29 July 1984 (age 42); Frome, England
- Citizenship: England; United States
- Occupations: Comedian; writer
- Years active: 2010–present
- Website: siobhanthompson.com

Siobhan Thompson (born 29 July 1984) is a British-American comedian and writer. She is known for her work on the CollegeHumor Originals web series and for her roles on Dropout's Dimension 20. She has appeared in other programmes such as Adam Ruins Everything and Broad City. She was also a staff writer for Adult Swim's Rick and Morty and as of 2024 a writer on Krapopolis.

== Biography ==
Thompson originally moved from England to the United States to be an archaeologist, but soon found herself drawn to comedy. She began taking classes at the Upright Citizens Brigade in 2010, and is a member of their Maude team Alamo. She is also the former host of the BBC America web series Anglophenia, the co-host of the sketch comedy podcast Left Handed Radio, and has appeared in multiple television shows.

She first appeared in a CollegeHumor sketch in May 2015.

In June 2018, it was announced that Joss Whedon would produce a comedy TV series created by Thompson and Rebecca Drysdale to air on Freeform.

Thompson is also a player on Dimension 20, an actual play show that premiered September 2018 on the Dropout streaming service. Her characters include Adaine Abernant (Fantasy High series), Misty Moore/Rowan Berry (The Unsleeping City), Princess Ruby Rocks (A Crown of Candy), Iga Lisowski (The Unsleeping City: Chapter II), Riva (A Starstruck Odyssey), Princess Rosamund Du Prix (Neverafter), Imelda Pulse (Mentopolis), a young stoat named Jaysohn (Burrow's End), Vanellope 'Van' Chapman (Cloudward, Ho!), La Contesse Madelaine d'Artois (City Council of Darkness), and haunted doll Constance (Toylight). In addition, she has guested on other Dropout programs such as Game Changer. She has also been a guest player character on Not Another D&D Podcast as Apple Scrumper and the Rotating Heroes Podcast as Astrid Starborn.

In November 2023, Thompson announced via Instagram that she had become a United States citizen.

== Filmography ==
=== Television ===
Year	Title	Role	Notes
2014–2015	Anglophenia	Self	26 episodes
2015–2017	Adam Ruins Everything	Various roles	4 episodes
2023–2026	Game Changer	Self	3 episodes
2015-2024	Um, Actually	Self	11 episodes

=== Web ===
Year	Title		Role	Notes
2018–present	Dimension 20	Fantasy High	Adaine Abernant	Main cast
2018–present	Dimension 20	The Unsleeping City	Misty Moore/Rowan Berry	Main cast
2018–present	Dimension 20	Fantasy High: Sophomore Year	Adaine Abernant	Main cast
2018–present	Dimension 20	A Crown of Candy	Princess Ruby Rocks	Main cast
2018–present	Dimension 20	The Unsleeping City: Chapter II	Iga Lisowski	Main cast
2018–present	Dimension 20	A Starstruck Odyssey	Riva	Main cast
2018–present	Dimension 20	Neverafter	Princess Rosamund Du Prix	Main cast
2018–present	Dimension 20	Mentopolis	Imelda Pulse	Main cast
2018–present	Dimension 20	Burrow's End	Jaysohn	Main cast
2018–present	Dimension 20	Fantasy High: Junior Year	Adaine Abernant	Main cast
2018–present	Dimension 20	Cloudward, Ho!	Vanellope 'Van' Chapman	Main cast
2018–present	Dimension 20	City Council of Darkness	La Contesse Madeleine	Main cast
2018	Not Another D&D Podcast	The Cutthroat Chronicles	Apple Scrumpler	Guest role; 3 episodes
2023	Rotating Heroes Podcast	Arc 1	Astrid Starborn	
