= Jake and Amir (web series) =

Comedy web series by CollegeHumor

- The show's third title card (2013–2016)
- Genre: Double act comedy Sketch comedy
- Starring: Amir Blumenfeld; Jake Hurwitz
- Country of origin: United States
- Original language: English
- No. of episodes: 696

Production
- Camera setup: Multiple (formerly single)
- Running time: 1–5 minutes
- Production companies: CollegeHumor (2007-2016); Independently produced (2021-present); Headgum (2020, 2023-present)

Original release
- Network: CollegeHumor; YouTube; Vimeo (2007–2008)
- Release: May 23, 2007 – April 7, 2015
- Release: August 9, 2021 – present

Related
- The CollegeHumor Show; Hardly Working; Geoffrey the Dumbass

Jake and Amir is a web series set in CollegeHumor's office in New York City and later Los Angeles where Jake Hurwitz and Amir Blumenfeld play humorous versions of themselves: Jake is usually depicted as a sensible "straight man" and Amir as his annoying, obsessive, and odd co-worker. Running for over eight years, Jake and Amir was CollegeHumor's longest-running series and has amassed approximately one billion views as of April 2017. The series served as the debut of the titular comedy duo Jake and Amir, who would go on to collaborate on other comedy projects.

== Concept ==
Some episodes have a common theme or MacGuffin that the episode revolves around, for instance buying a guitar or discussing the 2008 financial crisis. The series generally takes place at Jake and Amir's desks, but some episodes are filmed in other parts of the office or different locations entirely. Dan Frommer of Business Insider explains how "a trip to Florida became a four-part miniseries...broken-arm casts become props...[and] girlfriends become actresses".

Amir is obsessed with Jake, and often says or does annoying things to try to spend time with him. Amir is also obsessed with fast food chain McDonald's, especially Chicken McNuggets. He is unhealthy, doesn't do any work, and lacks common sense and basic knowledge about the world. He can also be very aggressive or physically abusive towards his co-workers, who generally hate him. Jake is also often portrayed as the butt of the joke, be it one beat or (as more commonly in later episodes) a whole episode, with Amir taking the role of the straight man and Jake the insecure delusional one.

Rapper Hoodie Allen appeared in three episodes as Amir's rap teacher. NBA player Rick Fox is featured in the series as Amir's bookie, who causes Amir to lose significant amounts of money. Comedian Thomas Middleditch was frequently featured in the series as Doobs, Amir's childhood frenemy. Comedian Ben Schwartz appeared in 22 episodes of the show. Actress Allison Williams appeared as Cheryl in two episodes. Competitive eater Takeru Kobayashi appears briefly in the episode Jake and Amir: Kobayashi, where Amir feeds him hot-dogs. Three of The Gregory Brothers appeared in an episode and released an accompanying song featuring Amir on their own YouTube channel. Actor Kumail Nanjiani was featured in four episodes as Jake's brother. Actor Ed Helms appeared in one of the last Jake and Amir episodes, Finale part 5, as Mickey, Amir’s friend.

== History ==
The series began in May 2007 when Jake and Amir began making sketch comedy videos starring the two of them. Originally sixty-second videos edited in iMovie and uploaded to Vimeo, the first episodes of Jake and Amir were just something that Jake and Amir did to make each-other laugh. Eventually, however, the videos gained such popularity that CollegeHumor began paying them to make the videos for their website. Jake explains that Jake and Amir was never intended to be a series:

We actually had no idea we were creating a series at the time we were doing it. I just thought Amir was so funny, and I had this crappy camera. We just made these videos and our friends started passing them around. It kind of grew from there.

On October 12, 2011, CollegeHumor released Jake and Amir: Fired, a thirty-minute episode of Jake and Amir that the pair made in the previous months while continuing to release short episodes. Available for purchase on CollegeHumor's website, Facebook, and available on DVD, the special was the company's first paid content. Its plot involves the fictitious new CEO of CollegeHumor, Alan Avery – played by Matt Walton – promoting Jake and firing Amir. Jake and Amir work together to get Amir's job back. Jake and Amir: Fired was directed by Sam Reich.

While working at CollegeHumor, Jake and Amir hosted live events as their characters from Jake and Amir, including CollegeHumor Live at locations such as the UCB Theatre in New York and the University of California, Berkeley. They have also performed in Toronto and London's Soho Theatre with Streeter Seidell in 2013. Though the latter show was sold out and extra dates were added, the performance was poorly received by local media: The Guardian's Brian Logan said Jake and Amir "cackle a lot, as they find various ways to repackage tales of puerile behaviour as comedy." In June 2012, at the International Student Film Festival in Tel Aviv, Israel, the pair gave a lecture at the New Media Conference.

The duo started thinking about leaving CollegeHumor when their new podcast If I Were You began to take off in 2015. After deciding to leave the website, CollegeHumor announced in January 2015 that the series would air its last eight episodes beginning on February 17, 2015. On October 27, 2016, the pair returned to CollegeHumor for a single episode of Jake and Amir, titled Jake and Amir: Donald Trump, to comment on the 2016 United States presidential election.

In 2018, the duo released a new web series hosted on Patreon entitled Jake and Amir Watch Jake and Amir. In the series, the titular comedians watch and review episodes of their Jake and Amir series while providing behind-the-scenes information. Jake and Amir have expressed interest in producing a new scripted series if their Patreon page reaches 10,000 subscribers.

On March 31, 2020, a new episode titled Jake and Amir: Social Distance Scroll was uploaded to the HeadGum YouTube channel.

In June 2021, the duo got the rights to the series back from CollegeHumor, and moved the videos over to their own Youtube channel. In August 2021, they started releasing new Jake and Amir videos again, starting with Podcast Ideas.

== Reception ==
Jake and Amir has received praise as its style and viewership have evolved and expanded, particularly within the field of free online content. Jake and Amir won the People's Voice award for Best Comedy: Long Running Form or Series in the 2010 Webby Awards, with Amir also capturing the People's Voice award for Best Individual Performance that year. Amir was nominated for Best Male Actor in a Comedy Web Series in the first, second, and third Streamy Awards for his role in Jake and Amir.

In 2008, PC Magazine listed the series among its "Top 100 Undiscovered Web Sites", saying: "Considering it's mainly a hobby they do after work, the webisodes at JakeAndAmir.com are better than some of the stuff they get paid to do for CollegeHumor." PC Magazine featured Jake and Amir again in 2011, when it listed the series as one of its "15 Best Web-Only Shows", commenting that, "they show no sign of running out of very bizarre situations for this sometimes disturbing comedy."
