= Dulaney High School =

Location
- 255 East Padonia Road; Timonium, Maryland 21093; United States; 39°27′39″N 76°36′47″W

Information
- Type: Public high school
- Opened: 1965
- School district: Baltimore County Public Schools
- Superintendent: Darryl L. Williams
- Principal: Samuel Wynkoop
- Campus: Suburban
- Colors: Red, Black, and White
- Nickname: Lions
- Publication: Sequel
- Newspaper: The Griffin
- Yearbook: The Heritage
- Feeder schools: Ridgely and Cockeysville middle schools
- Website: dulaneyhs.bcps.org
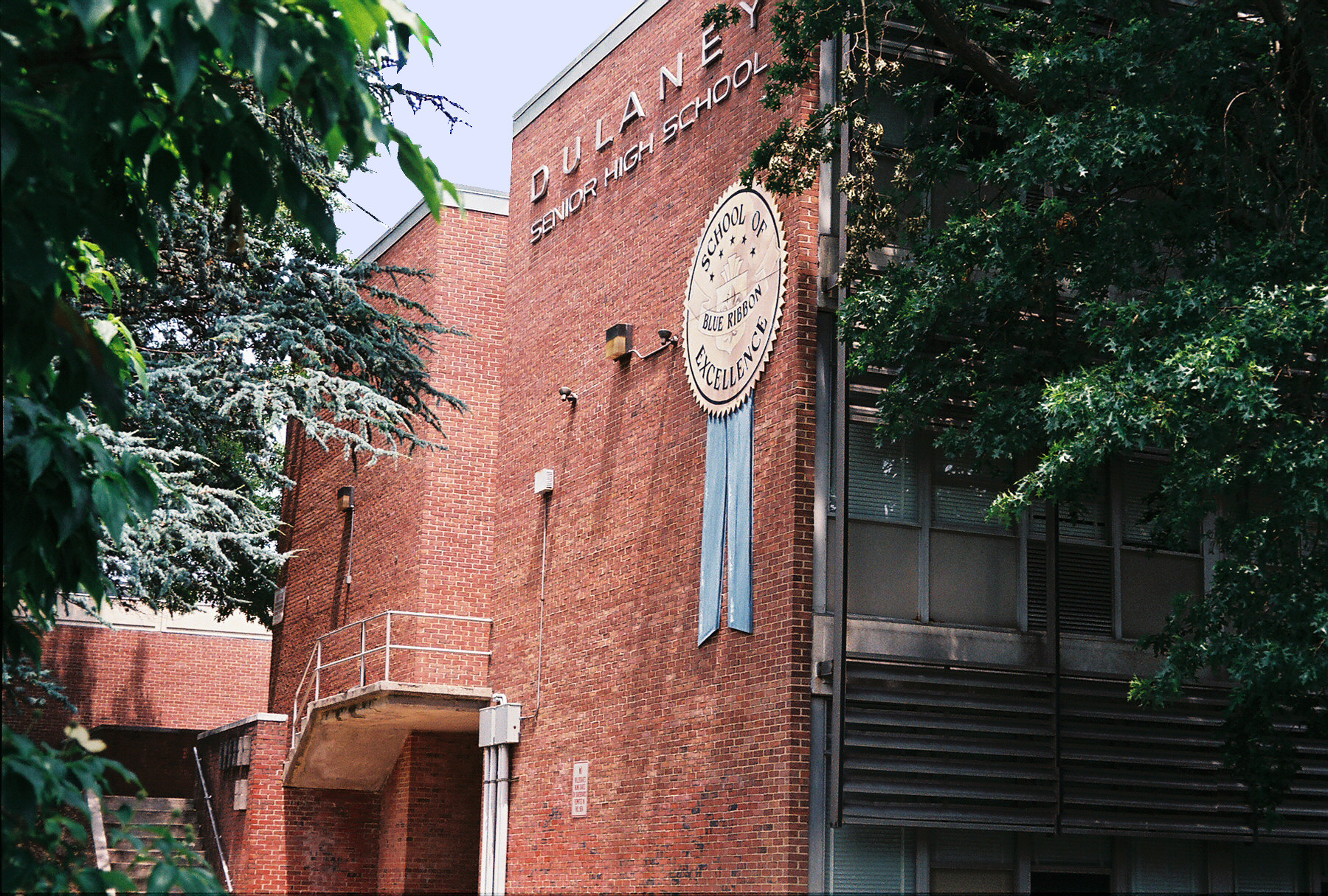
- The school's Blue Ribbon School of Excellence

Dulaney High School is a secondary school in Timonium, Baltimore County, Maryland, United States. The school serves a generally upper-middle class suburban community, with students from Timonium and surrounding areas in Baltimore County. It is situated on 45 acres (18 ha) adjacent to Dulaney Valley Memorial Gardens.

== History ==
Built in the early 1960s, the school graduated its first senior class in 1965. As of 2015, Dulaney had reported a total enrollment of 1,851 students. The school is accredited by the state of Maryland and is a member of the National Association for College Admission Counseling. There were 186 faculty members in the 2015–2016 school year.

Various proposals to renovate or replace the school building were made in 2016 and 2017. County officials budgeted $40 million in 2017 to renovate and air condition the facility, but the plan was rejected when parents contended that an entirely new school should instead be considered. In response, the then-County Executive proposed that the fiscal year 2019 budget include planning for a new high school to ease overcrowding at Dulaney and other area high schools. Funding was not forthcoming, however, and the Baltimore County Board of Education renewed its capital budget request for Fiscal Years 2020 and again for 2021. Included in the overall $216 million sought would be replacement buildings for Dulaney and Towson High School.

== Academics ==
Dulaney High school received a 65.8 out of a possible 100 points (65%) on the 2018–2019 Maryland State Department of Education Report Card and received a 4 out of 5 star rating, ranking in the 62nd percentile among all Maryland schools.

In Baltimore County, Dulaney offers the highest number of Advanced Placement courses.

== Students ==
The 2019–2020 enrollment at Dulaney High School was 1914 students.

== Activities ==
Dulaney hosts more than 70 different clubs and organizations for its students. Among the clubs are: Peer Tutors, Science News Club, Girl Up, K-Pop Dance Club, Dance Team, Dulanians, Key Club, Sports Teams, and the National Honor Society. Dulaney also has a VEX Robotics team and a FIRST Robotics team. The band marched in the 2011 and 2015 London New Year's Day Parades and has also marched several parades down Main Street, USA in the Magic Kingdom Park and Epcot at Walt Disney World in Orlando, Florida and performed in the 2013 Allstate Sugar Bowl Halftime Show.

== Athletics ==
The Dulaney High School Lions have won the following Maryland State Championships:

=== State championships ===
Girls Cross Country

- Class AA 1981
- 4A 1992, 1994, 1995, 1996, 1997
- 3A 2001

Boys Cross Country

- Class AA 1968, 1979, 1980, 1981, 1983
- 4A 2015, 2016

Field Hockey

- Sportsmanship Award 2013

Golf

- 3A/4A 2000

Girls Soccer

- 4A-3A 1993

Boys Soccer

- 4A 1999 TIE

Volleyball:

- 4A 1999, 2000, 2013

Girls Basketball

- Class AA 1988
- Mildred Haney Murray Sportsmanship Award 1983, 1985, 1987

Girls Lacrosse

- 4A-3A 2005, 2006, 2016

Boys Lacrosse

- 4A-3A 1990, 1991, 2000, 2001, 2002, 2003, 2005, 2008

Girls Softball

- Eugene Robertson Sportsmanship Award 2003 TIE

Boys Track and Field

- Class AA 1969

== Awards and rankings ==
Dulaney was awarded the Blue Ribbon School of Excellence in 1995. In 2010, Dulaney was named No. 259 on Newsweek magazine's "1,200 Top U.S. high schools" annual national survey.

== Notable alumni ==
- Josh Abramson, entrepreneur and co-founder of the comedy website CollegeHumor, was one of the principal owners and founders of Connected Ventures, and the co-founder, owner, and CEO of the crowdsourced T-shirt design company TeePublic
- Charla Baklayan Faddoul, reality television personality who appeared on The Amazing Race 5 and The Amazing Race: All-Stars
- Brian Balmages, composer, conductor, and music educator.
- Nicholas Waggoner Browning, convicted murderer
- Mark Bowden, author
- Kathryn Craft, author of literary fiction and contemporary women's fiction
- Monica Dogra, actress
- Kendel Sibiski Ehrlich, radio talk show host
- Alex Gaskarth, lead singer of All Time Low
- J.B. Jennings, Maryland State Senator
- Jill Johnson, Olympic swimmer, Class of 1986
- Phil Karn, Internet engineer
- Rjyan Claybrook Kidwell, founder of the music project Cex
- Kevin Kilner, actor
- Dawn Kotoski, international opera soprano
- Chris Norman, flautist
- Sean Rush, professional soccer player
- Ricky Van Veen, co-founder of CollegeHumor.com
- Crystal C. Watkins Johansson, neuroscientist and psychiatrist
- Bob Wheeler, Olympian, 1972 Munich Olympics (1500 meters)
- Cheryl Wheeler, folk musician/songwriter, Class of 1969
- Gregory Reid Wiseman, NASA astronaut, Artemis II commander (2026), the first crewed mission to travel near the Moon since 1972
