= Pat Cassels =

American writer and humorist

- Occupations: Writer, humorist
- Notable work: Full Frontal with Samantha Bee, CollegeHumor, Bad Internet
- Awards: Primetime Emmy Award

Pat Cassels is an American writer and humorist. He is best known for his work as a founding cast member and writer of CollegeHumor (rebranded as Dropout in 2023), and as a writer on the TBS late-night series Full Frontal with Samantha Bee (2016–2022).

== Career ==
Cassels began his career in 2007 as a cast member and writer at the online comedy website CollegeHumor. He worked on the site's web series Hardly Working, CollegeHumor Originals, and If Google Was A Guy. He left CollegeHumor in 2015.

While at CollegeHumor, Cassels co-wrote and starred in YouTube Red's science fiction web series Bad Internet (also featuring Jean Smart and Britt Lower), and the CollegeHumor Star Wars parody series Troopers (starring Aubrey Plaza). Cassels also contributed to the period comedy series The Britishes.

Cassels served as a staff writer on Full Frontal with Samantha Bee from 2016 to 2022. The series earned eleven Primetime Emmy nominations and one win, and was named one of the year's top shows by The New York Times, The A.V. Club, The Ringer, and Variety.

He writes essays and humor pieces for The New Yorker and Atlas Obscura. He has contributed to Slate, Oxford American, Los Angeles Review of Books, Dazed, and The New York Times.

== Acting ==
Cassels appeared in a number of comedic web series and television programs, including Adam Ruins Everything, Jake and Amir, and Full Frontal with Samantha Bee.

Between 2010 and 2011, Cassels hosted the web series Hello, My Name Is (2010), an improvised talk show starring Josh Ruben. The series was rebooted in 2023 as Very Important People with Vic Michaelis as host.

He has acted in a number of stunts with Improv Everywhere.

== Awards and recognition ==
Cassels has been nominated for seven Primetime Emmy Awards, winning once for Full Frontal with Samantha Bee. He received the Writers Guild of America Award in 2020 and 2022.
