= Josh Abramson =

American entrepreneur

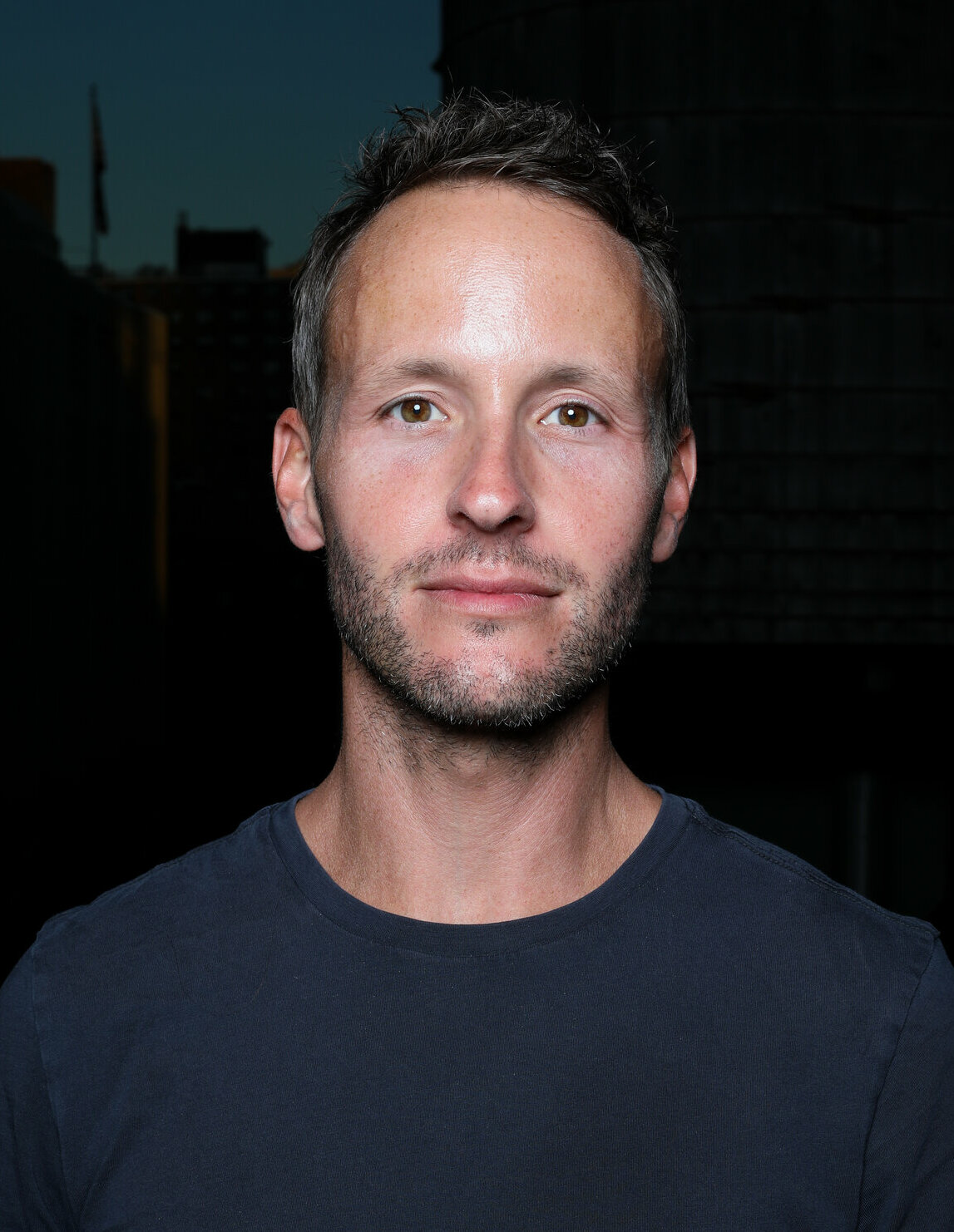
- Abramson in 2021
- Born: 1981 (age 44–45); Baltimore, Maryland, U.S.
- Education: University of Richmond
- Occupations: Entrepreneur, Investor
- Years active: 2006–present
- Known for: CollegeHumor, Vimeo, BustedTees, TeePublic
- Spouse: Gabrielle Borden Finley (m. 2010)
- Website: twitter.com/joshabramson

Josh Abramson (born 1981) is an American entrepreneur and co-founder of the comedy website Dropout (formally CollegeHumor). He was one of the principal owners and founders of Connected Ventures, whose properties also included Vimeo and BustedTees, and the co-founder, owner, and CEO of the crowdsourced T-shirt design company TeePublic.

== Career ==
=== CollegeHumor ===
Abramson and Ricky Van Veen co-founded CollegeHumor in 1999 when they were both freshmen in college, Abramson at the University of Richmond and Van Veen at Wake Forest. They began by posting silly photos of themselves as well as jokes, links, and other amusing material they collected from emails circulating among college students. Within three months the site was receiving over 600,000 visitors per month and $8,000 in monthly revenue. In under a year they received a buyout offer from an Internet company called eFront for $9 million, most of which would have been financed with stock shares. Abramson and Van Veen refused the offer and continued to grow the company themselves. In 2001 they added Jake Lodwick, a student at Rochester Institute of Technology, and Zach Klein, a friend of Van Veen's from Wake Forest. By the time the group graduated from college the site had earned more than $100,000 and the partners still owned 100 percent of their business, which at that time was attracting 2 million viewers a month. The group moved the company to San Diego briefly before settling in New York City in 2004, where they set up shop in a 4,800 square-foot loft in TriBeCa.

By 2005, the site was receiving 6–8 million unique visitors each month and was generating over 5 million dollars per year in advertising and T-shirt sales. In 2006 Abramson and company sold 51% of Connected Ventures, CollegeHumor's parent company, the properties of which include CollegeHumor, Vimeo and BustedTees, to Barry Diller’s IAC/InterActiveCorp for a reported $20 million.

=== BustedTees ===
Abramson and company created BustedTees in 2004 as a forum to sell T-shirts marketed on CollegeHumor. BustedTees was included in the 2006 sale of Connected Ventures to IAC/InterActiveCorp but in 2011 Abramson bought the company back. BustedTees later spawned TeePublic. It was included in the TeePublic sale in 2018.

=== TeePublic ===
Abramson launched TeePublic in March 2013 with the aim of creating a self-sustaining community of T-shirt designers and T-shirt lovers. The T-shirt designs are submitted by artists, designers, and celebrities, and are curated through crowdsourcing.

In October 2018, TeePublic was acquired by Redbubble, a global online marketplace based in Australia, for US$41 million.

=== Venture capital financing ===
Abramson has invested in several early-stage tech companies, including BarkBox, a subscription e-commerce and content company for dog-lovers, AmberJack, a booking platform for fishing trips, ManagedByQ, an office management platform, and Shinesty, a retro clothing company, among others. In 2013 Abramson joined venture capital firm FirstMark Capital, the New York-based firm behind major companies like Pinterest and Shopify, in a venture partner role.

== Personal life ==
Abramson grew up in Timonium, Maryland, a suburb of Baltimore. He and fellow CollegeHumor co-founder Ricky Van Veen were friends since the sixth grade and attended Dulaney High School together.

Abramson resides in New York City. In April 2010, he married Gabrielle Borden Finley. In 2022, he opened a wine bar in Manhattan's Lower East Side neighborhood.
