= Pranked =

American sketch comedy television series

- Genre: Improvisational comedy; Sketch comedy
- Starring: Amir Blumenfeld; Streeter Seidell
- Opening theme: "Neon Politik" by The Franks
- Country of origin: United States
- No. of seasons: 5
- No. of episodes: 54

Production
- Executive producers: Cheri Brownle; John Johnston; Shawn Witt; Tim Healy; Tony DiBari
- Running time: 20 to 24 minutes (excluding commercials)
- Production company: Cheri Sundae Productions

Original release
- Network: MTV
- Release: August 27, 2009 – November 30, 2012

Related
- The CollegeHumor Show

Pranked is an American sketch comedy television series hosted by CollegeHumor's Amir Blumenfeld and Streeter Seidell that aired on MTV from August 27, 2009, to November 30, 2012.

== Premise ==
The series is a half-an-hour comedy show that provides footage and commentary for pranks that have been caught on camera and posted to the internet.

== Cast ==
- Amir Blumenfeld: Blumenfeld is the senior writer for CollegeHumor.com. He also stars in web series, "Jake and Amir" and "Hardly Working".
- Streeter Seidell: Seidell is the executive editor of CollegeHumor.com and also for the series Streeter Theeter.

== Episodes ==
Season	Episodes	Originally released	
Season	Episodes	First released	Last released
1	8	August 27, 2009	October 15, 2009
2	12	May 27, 2010	July 15, 2010
3	8	November 4, 2010	December 23, 2010
4	10	February 21, 2012	March 7, 2012
5	16	October 29, 2012	November 30, 2012

=== Season 1 (2009) ===
No. overall	No. in season	Title	Original release date
1	1	"Episode 1"	August 27, 2009
2	2	"Episode 2"	September 3, 2009
3	3	"Episode 3"	September 10, 2009
4	4	"Episode 4"	September 17, 2009
5	5	"Episode 5"	September 24, 2009
6	6	"Episode 6"	October 1, 2009
7	7	"Episode 7"	October 8, 2009
8	8	"Episode 8"	October 15, 2009

=== Season 2 (2010) ===
No. overall	No. in season	Title	Original release date
9	1	"Episode 1"	May 27, 2010
10	2	"Episode 6"	May 27, 2010
11	3	"Episode 7"	June 3, 2010
12	4	"Episode 8"	June 3, 2010
13	5	"Episode 9"	June 10, 2010
14	6	"Episode 10"	June 17, 2010
15	7	"Episode 11"	June 17, 2010
16	8	"Episode 4"	June 24, 2010
17	9	"Episode 5"	June 24, 2010
18	10	"Episode 2"	July 1, 2010
19	11	"Episode 3"	July 8, 2010
20	12	"Best of Season 2"	July 15, 2010

=== Season 3 (2010) ===
No. overall	No. in season	Title	Original release date
21	1	"Mansion"	November 4, 2010
22	2	"Roller Rink"	November 11, 2010
23	3	"Strip Club"	November 18, 2010
24	4	"Pet Store"	December 2, 2010
25	5	"Barber Shop"	December 9, 2010
26	6	"A Pranked Holiday"	December 21, 2010
27	7	"Recording Studio"	December 23, 2010
28	8	"Health Club"	December 23, 2010

=== Season 4 (2012) ===
No. overall	No. in season	Title	Original release date
29	1	"Magic Shop"	February 21, 2012
30	2	"Adventure Land"	February 22, 2012
31	3	"Tanning Salon"	February 24, 2012
32	4	"Comedy Club"	February 27, 2012
33	5	"Sneaker Store"	February 28, 2012
34	6	"Yoga Studio"	February 29, 2012
35	7	"Italian Restaurant"	March 1, 2012
36	8	"Mini-Golf Course"	March 5, 2012
37	9	"Martial Arts Studio"	March 6, 2012
38	10	"Thrift Store"	March 7, 2012

=== Season 5 (2012) ===
No. overall	No. in season	Title	Original release date
39	1	"The Bowling Alley"	October 29, 2012
40	2	"The Sculpture Garden"	October 30, 2012
41	3	"The Baseball Diamond"	October 31, 2012
42	4	"Trout Lake"	November 1, 2012
43	5	"The Bakery"	November 6, 2012
44	6	"Episode 6"	November 7, 2012
45	7	"The Greenhouse Garden"	November 8, 2012
46	8	"The Cowboy Bar"	November 13, 2012
47	9	"The Alley"	November 14, 2012
48	10	"The Tree House"	November 15, 2012
49	11	"Episode 11"	November 16, 2012
50	12	"The Bookstore"	November 26, 2012
51	13	"The Trampoline Park"	November 28, 2012
52	14	"The Green Screen"	November 28, 2012
53	15	"The Playground"	November 29, 2012
54	16	"The Horse Stables"	November 30, 2012
