= Elaine Carroll =

American actress and writer

- Born: New York City, U.S.
- Education: Marymount Manhattan College (BFA)
- Occupations: Actress, writer
- Years active: 2008–present
- Spouse: Sam Reich (m. 2010)
- Relatives: Robert Reich (father-in-law)
- Website: elainecarroll.xyz

Elaine Carroll is an American actress and writer. She is best known for her role as a fictionalized Mary-Kate Olsen on the web series Very Mary-Kate, which she created.

== Life and career ==
Carroll was born in New York City, and she and her family moved to Richmond, Virginia at the age of five. She grew up loving all forms of the arts, and began doing plays in first grade when her class put on a production of The King and I. She is married to producer Sam Reich; the two met in 2000, when they were at summer camp.

"I decided I wanted to be an actor when I was seven and I never changed my mind," Carroll has stated. At age ten, Carroll attended the School of Performing Arts in the Richmond Community.

In 2001, she graduated from Mills Godwin High School, and spent time in London while working at an Express. She has a BFA in Acting from Marymount Manhattan College, and she studied improv and sketch at the Upright Citizens Brigade Theatre where she performs regularly.

In 2008, Carroll used an impression of the Olsen twins during an audition for Saturday Night Live. Carroll indicated that, "It went over really well," but "obviously I didn't get on the show." She continued to do the impression, and had been doing it for about two years before making a short video called "The Olsen Twin Minute" that "featured Mary-Kate and Ashley in a talk show." The experience led Carroll to realize she wanted to do more with the twin impression and "started trying to visualize what life is like for them. They're rich and famous, but also kind of mysterious and private, which leaves a ton of room for the imagination." Taking facts she already knew, such as Olsen's use of a bodyguard and taking classes at NYU, Carroll crafted a web series that "started filling in the blanks." In 2010, she began to star on Very Mary-Kate, a web series she also created and wrote. Very Mary-Kate is the "unofficial biography of everyone's favorite Olsen twin," Mary-Kate Olsen. The series follows Mary-Kate's daily adventures as Carroll portrays Olsen as a "character who's a weak-yet-demanding kitten obsessed with calories, abusing her bodyguard and getting her hands on the good drugs."

The series was originally produced out-of-pocket, but was picked up for its second season by CollegeHumor. The show's fourth and final season premiered on CollegeHumor on January 17, 2013. Very Mary-Kate received positive reviews. The Wall Street Journal called the web series "a viral sensation". The @rcade stated that,

Elaine has brought one of the funniest and best web-series to the internet. Her performance as the rich teen princess and her rich teen princess twin sister is flawless, (flawless in the sense that we've never met the Olsen twins but we've always assumed that they acted just as Elaine portrays them). Less than two minutes in length, each episode is guaranteed to have you laughing within the first 12 seconds (how exact!) and you will no doubt be hooked as we were and will certainly need to check out more of her stuff.

In 2010, she appeared in an episode of the AMC drama series Mad Men, and the next year had a small role as a nurse in the thriller film The Good Doctor.

In 2013, Carroll began to co-star in the web series Precious Plum, a parody of the reality show Here Comes Honey Boo Boo. The show was about Plum (Carroll), a child beauty pageant contestant whose mother takes her to shows and it deals with the misfortunes they faced on the way. The same year, Carroll was listed as one of Vulture's "50 Comedians You Should and Will Know" and one of Complex's "25 Funny People Who Should Get Their Own TV Show."

In 2015, she was cast as Harriet Eisele on The Astronaut Wives Club, an American period drama television series which premiered on June 18 of that year. ABC canceled the series after one season.

== Filmography ==
Year	Title	Role	Notes
2009	The CollegeHumor Show	Samantha	Season 1, episode 4-5: "Sarah's New Boyfriend" (as a bar lady) and "Hot Girl"
2010	Mad Men	Janine	Season 4, episode 3: "The Good News"
2010–13	Very Mary-Kate	Mary-Kate Olsen	77 episodes; also creator and writer
2011	The Good Doctor	New Nurse	
2013	Husbands	Parker	Season 3, episode 4: "I Dream of Cleaning"
2013	The League	Credit Card Lady	Season 5, episode 11: "The Credit Card Alert"
2013	Precious Plum	Plum	13 episodes; also co-creator and co-writer
2014	Modern Family	Female Magician	Season 5, episode 18: "Las Vegas"
2015	The Astronaut Wives Club	Harriet Eisele	Season 1, episodes 7–9
2015	Crazy Ex-Girlfriend	Hayley	Season 1, episode 9: "I'm Going to the Beach with Josh and His Friends!"
2018	Arrested Development	Jen	Season 5, episode 4: "An Old Start"
2018	See Plum Run	Plum Miller	Also co-creator and co-writer
2022	Out of Office	Tennessee	
2022	Make Some Noise		Writer
2022	Breaking News	Herself	Season 3, episode 6; season 5, episode 2; season 6, episode 17
2023	Dirty Laundry	Herself	Season 2, episode 10: "Who Called in a Favor From a Sitting Governor?"
2024-2026	Game Changer	Herself	Season 6, episode 2: "The Newlyweb Game"; Season 7, episode 10: "Outvoted"; Season 7, episode 11: "Samalamadingdong" Season 8, episode 1: "Don't Wake Standards and Practices"
2024	Gastronauts	Herself	Season 1, episode 3: "I Find That Very A-Peeling"
2026	MP3	Roop	
