= The Old Man and the Seymour =

2009 American film

The Old Man and the Seymour is a 2009 American comedy short film starring Streeter Seidell and Amir Blumenfeld. It was written and directed by Giancarlo Fiorentini and Jonathan Grimm.

Seymour, portrayed by Seidell, is taken in by his uncle, portrayed by Blumenfeld. Seymour's uncle, a 47-year-old man with growth hormone deficiency, is mistaken for a high schooler. Finding himself suddenly popular, meeting girls and going to parties, Seymour's uncle decides to pretend that he is in fact the new kid in school. Things go downhill.

The film was selected to the Austin Film Festival, Friars Club Comedy Film Festival, LA Shorts Fest, among others. It premiered at NYU's First Run Film Festival, and was the directors' thesis project.

A nosebleed effect used when Seymour (Streeter Seidell) is hit in the face with a dodgeball by Craig (Dan Gurewitch) is made by Erik Beck from Indy Mogul.

== Cast ==
- Amir Blumenfeld as Lewis Plunkett
- Streeter Seidell as Seymour Plunkett
- Heather Cavalet as Mindy
- Liz Cackowski as Lawyer
- Jordan Carlos as Mr. Horsey
- Shawn Harrison as Shawn
- Dan Gurewitch as Craig
- Agustín González as Gus
- Nick Raio as Gord Plunkett
