= The CollegeHumor Show =

2009 American sitcom

- Created by: Ricky Van Veen; Sam Reich; Scott Tomlinson
- Starring: Amir Blumenfeld; Patrick Cassels; Dan Gurewitch; Jake Hurwitz; Sam Reich; Jeff Rubin; Sarah Schneider; Streeter Seidell; Ricky Van Veen
- Country of origin: United States
- No. of seasons: 1
- No. of episodes: 6

Production
- Executive producers: Ricky Van Veen; Sam Reich; Scott Tomlinson; Josh Abramson
- Camera setup: Film, Single camera
- Running time: approx. 21 minutes

Original release
- Network: MTV (2009)
- Release: February 8 – March 15, 2009

Related
- Pranked

The CollegeHumor Show is an American sitcom that premiered on MTV on February 8, 2009 and also aired on MuchMusic. The show was a scripted sitcom with sketch comedy elements written by, and starring, nine CollegeHumor editorial staff members, who play fictionalized versions of themselves. The show was an adaptation of the style of the long-running Hardly Working short film series created for the CollegeHumor site, made more suitable for the longer, televised format.

After the conclusion of the six episode season, the series was cancelled.

The series also spawned the spin-off show Pranked, hosted by Streeter Seidell and Amir Blumenfeld and airing on MTV.

== Cast ==
=== Main characters ===
In the show, the actual CollegeHumor (and CollegeHumor Show) writers play fictionalized versions of themselves. There is no single "star" of the show; rather, the nine main characters function as an ensemble. For the most part, the characters are self-centered, operating according to their immediate desires rather than making rational or sensitive decisions.

- Ricky (Ricky Van Veen) is the editor-in-chief; a wealthy, image-obsessed young man who craves the attention of D-list celebrities.
- Sam (Sam Reich) manages the writing staff, though he is essentially as immature as the rest of them. Sam has a close friendship with Dan.
- Dan (Dan Gurewitch) is a bright-eyed, enthusiastic writer who often has a naive approach to women and the world.
- Amir (Amir Blumenfeld) is the outcast of the gang, socially inept and prone to fits of irrational anger. He wants nothing more than to be best friends with Jake. Their dysfunctional relationship was created and cultivated in their online video series Jake and Amir.
- Jake (Jake Hurwitz) is the office ladies' man, and is enamored with Sarah. He spends much of his time attempting to convince Amir that they are not, in fact, best friends. He is sometimes up showed by Amir.
- Sarah (Sarah Schneider), the most down-to-earth member of the group. As she is a bit of a tomboy, the guys on staff treat her like a sister. She is often the sole voice of reason in an otherwise chaotic office.
- Streeter (Streeter Seidell), the front page editor, is moodier than the rest of the writers and is prone to emitting a signature whine when he doesn't get his way.
- Jeff (Jeffrey "Jeff" Rubin), managing editor and video game fanatic, has a more "go with the flow" attitude.
- Pat (Patrick "Pat" Cassels) tends to be more eccentric and put-upon than the other characters.

=== Supporting cast ===
- Nick Kroll as Chuck Paulson, CEO of CollegeHumor's fictional rival website GiggleBarn.biz.
- Josh Ruben as Trip, an insensitive magician who the CH boys attempt to set up with Sarah. Josh is another actual CollegeHumor employee, appearing in sketches featured on the site.

== Episodes ==
No.	Title	Directed by	Written by	Original release date
1	"Rival Site"	Sam Reich	Amir Blumenfeld, Dan Gurewitch, Sam Reich	February 8, 2009
Ricky loses Patrick to a rival site of CollegeHumor, and the gang gets him back in a beer pong competition.
2	"Interns"	Sam Reich	Amir Blumenfeld, Patrick Cassels	February 15, 2009
The strategy of hiring only hot girl interns backfires on the gang.
3	"The Morning After"	Sam Reich	Amir Blumenfeld, Dan Gurewitch	February 22, 2009
Patrick and Streeter are accused of murder the day after the America's Hottest College Girl party.
4	"Sarah's New Boyfriend"	Sam Reich	Dan Gurewitch, Sarah Schneider	March 1, 2009
Sam, Dan, Jeff and Patrick find a perfect boyfriend for Sarah in Trip, an insensitive jerk.
5	"Hot Girl"	Sam Reich	Jake Hurwitz, Sam Reich, Streeter Seidell	March 8, 2009
The gang, save for Sarah, is entranced by Jessica, a hot girl from accounting, and makes foolish mistakes.
6	"Armageddon"	Sam Reich	Amir Blumenfeld, Dan Gurewitch	March 15, 2009
The gang mistakenly believes that CollegeHumor is ending at 6pm that day, and (over)reacts in different ways.

== Production ==
The CollegeHumor Show was filmed inside the actual offices of Connected Ventures, which owned CollegeHumor at the time. The production crew was the same team responsible for the original comedy videos that CollegeHumor produced.

=== Main crew ===
The nine main actors on the show also comprised the show's writing staff.

- Scott Tomlinson is the show runner and executive producer.
- Ricky Van Veen is an executive producer.
- Josh Abramson is an executive producer.
- Sam Grossman is an executive in charge of production.
- Sam Reich is an executive producer and the show's director, having directed all six episodes. He also co-wrote the episode "Rival Site" with Dan Gurewitch and Amir Blumenfeld.
- Dan Gurewitch and Amir Blumenfeld co-wrote three episodes ("Rival Site," "The Morning After" and "Armageddon"). In addition, Gurewitch wrote the episode "Sarah's New Boyfriend" with Sarah Schneider, and Blumenfeld wrote the episode "Interns" with Patrick Cassels.
- Jake Hurwitz, Jeff Rubin, Streeter Seidell and Kevin Corrigan are staff writers on the show.
- Vincent Peone is the Director of Photography.
- David Fishel is the post-production manager and an editor. He also directed segments for three episodes ("Rival Site," "Hot Girl," and "Sarah's New Boyfriend").
- Michael Schaubach is an editor

== Reception ==
The show has seen mixed responses from critics. Time Magazine's TV critic James Poniewozik hailed the show as "really funny," noting that CollegeHumor is "doing comedy that specifically works on television, as opposed to simply porting over viral videos to a slightly bigger screen." Conversely, Liz Shannon Miller of GigaOM described it as "deeply disappointing, given how many of CollegeHumor's web shorts rank as fantastic examples of fresh and creative online content". The show was renewed for a second season, however CollegeHumor declined due to contract disagreements.
