= Amir Blumenfeld =

Israeli American comedian

- אמיר בלומנפלד
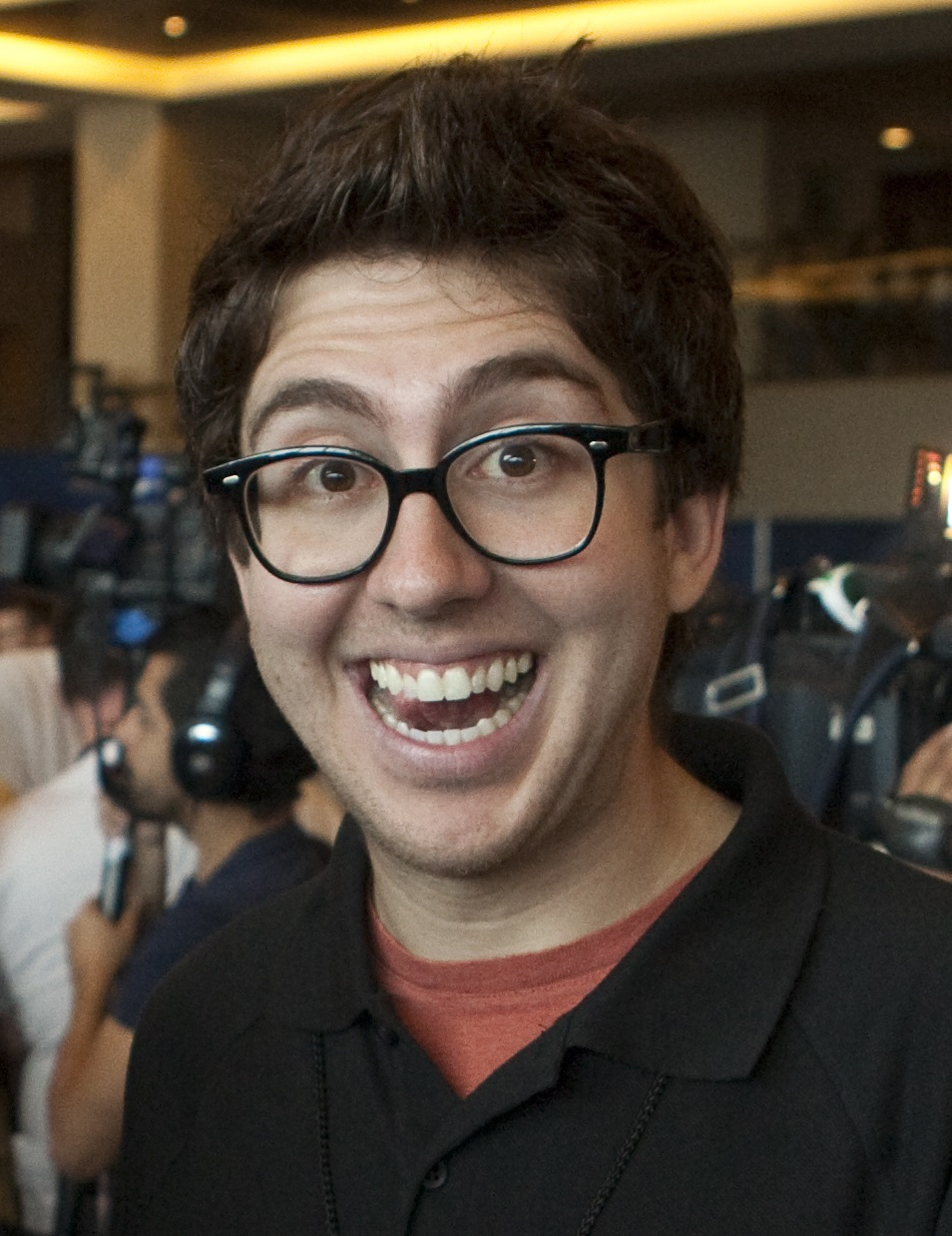
- Blumenfeld in 2010
- Born: Amir Shmuel Blumenfeld; January 18, 1983 (age 43); Afula, Israel
- Education: University of California, Berkeley
- Occupations: Comedian, actor, writer, presenter
- Years active: 2004–present
- Spouse: Avital Ash
- Website: amirblumenfeld.com

Amir Shmuel Blumenfeld (/əˈmɪər ʃmuˈɛl ˈbluːmənfɛld/; Hebrew: אמיר שמואל בלומנפלד; born January 18, 1983) is an Israeli-American comedian, actor, writer, television host, and member of the American comedy duo, Jake and Amir. Born in Israel, he moved to Los Angeles when he was two, and was hired by the New York City-based CollegeHumor in 2005. As well as contributing to its books and articles, he has written and starred in original videos for the comedy website—appearing in series such as Hardly Working and Very Mary-Kate—and was a cast member on its short-lived MTV program The CollegeHumor Show.

Blumenfeld first came to national prominence in 2004 when he was a semi-finalist during Yahoo's inaugural national IM Live contest, losing to the eventual champions. Now, he is best known for appearing in the web series Jake and Amir with Jake Hurwitz, in which he plays an annoying and exaggerated version of himself. Originally made by Hurwitz and Blumenfeld in their spare time, the series was then produced by CollegeHumor. Blumenfeld's acting in the series gained him a Webby Award for Best Individual Performance in 2010.

The Prank War series, which depicts Blumenfeld and Streeter Seidell as they play a series of escalating practical jokes on each other, became popular and led to the two appearing on Jimmy Kimmel Live! in 2009. MTV later hired Seidell and Blumenfeld to host Pranked, a clip show featuring prank videos from the Internet. Blumenfeld and Seidell later admitted that the original series was staged. Outside of CollegeHumor, Blumenfeld has appeared in the short film The Old Man and the Seymour, the television series Louie and I Just Want My Pants Back, and the 2011 film A Very Harold & Kumar 3D Christmas. He also wrote for ESPN The Magazine and Mental Floss.

== Personal life ==
Blumenfeld was born in Afula, Israel, and moved to Los Angeles at the age of two with his parents and two older brothers—his family is Reform Jewish. He has described how he became aware of his humor early on: "I realized I was funny at an early age, I realized I could make people laugh at a later age, and then by college time, I was trying to make jokes in terms of writing".

He attended a Jewish kindergarten and elementary school, before going to Milken Community High School, a private Jewish high school. During the summer, he attended computer camp and mathematics camp, but has expressed regret that he did not go to a Jewish summer camp.

Blumenfeld graduated from the Haas School of Business at the University of California, Berkeley with a Bachelor of Science degree, hoping to get a creative job in advertising or marketing while writing comedy on the side. He now uses his undergraduate degree "to make somewhat intelligent jokes about finance and accounting, but nothing much beyond that."

Since 2017, Blumenfeld has dated Avital Ash, a writer, actress, and comedian. They appeared together in the Dropout web series Lonely and Horny. The couple married on October 15, 2023.

Blumenfeld is Jewish, although he has described himself as "not too religious" and does not attend synagogue weekly, nor does he keep Kosher. He does, however, celebrate Jewish holidays with his family and speaks Hebrew. He is a basketball fan, and supports the Los Angeles Lakers—his favorite players are Nick Van Exel and the late Kobe Bryant.

== Career ==
=== CollegeHumor ===
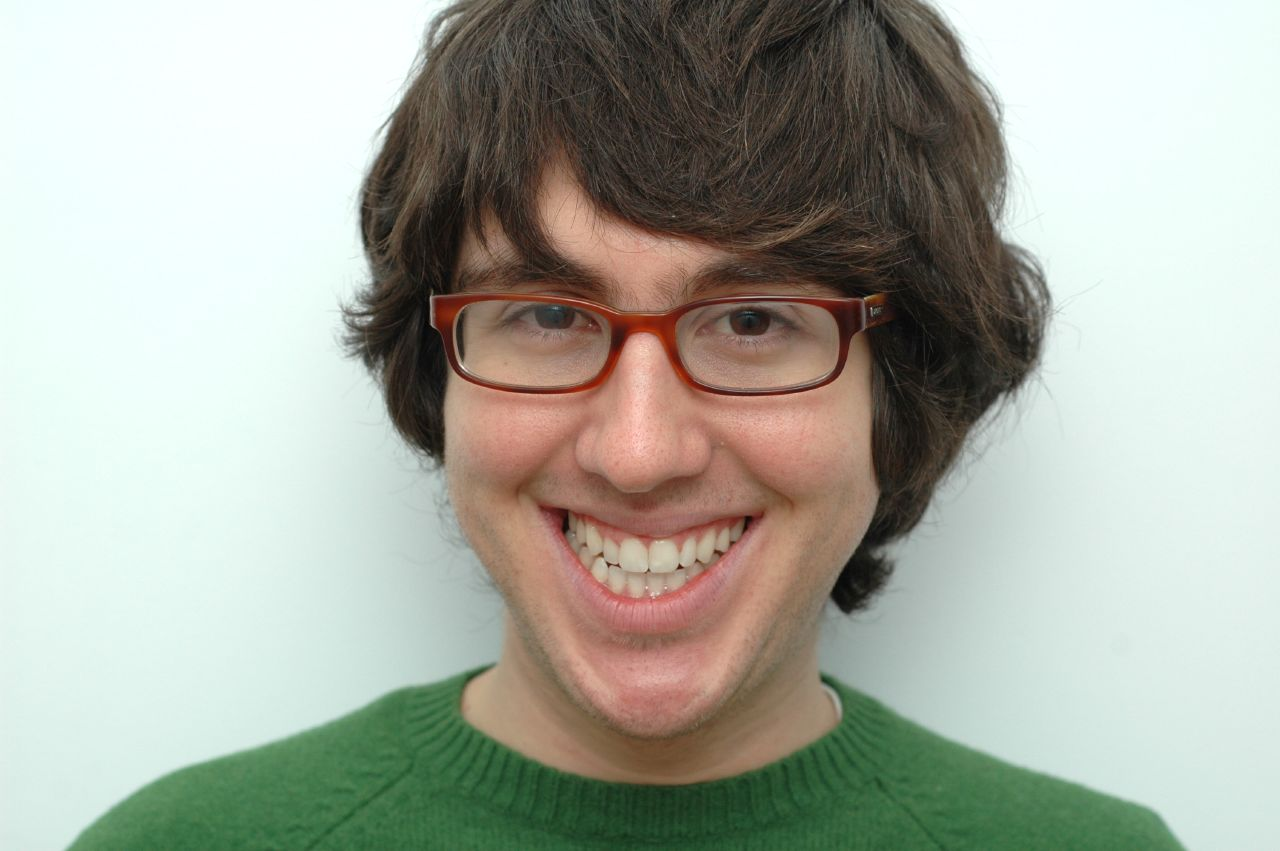
Amir Blumenfeld in 2005

In 2003, while a sophomore at Berkeley, Blumenfeld began writing articles for the comedy website CollegeHumor after he emailed its co-founder Ricky Van Veen ideas, which Van Veen found funny and posted on the website. When Blumenfeld graduated in 2005, CollegeHumor hired him and Streeter Seidell full-time to write The CollegeHumor Guide to College—a humorous book presented as a guide to university education—and he moved to New York City aged 22. He later moved to writing original videos for CollegeHumor with Dan Gurewitch, and has acted in CH Originals, as well as the series Hardly Working. He has portrayed Woody Allen in episodes of Hardly Working and Very Mary-Kate—MTV's Guy Code Blog listed his among "The 8 Best Woody Allen Impressions We Found On The Internet". His favorite sketch written for CollegeHumor is entitled "Moments Before Cup Chicks", and involves a director briefing the participants of the viral scatological video 2 Girls 1 Cup.

Beginning in 2007, he and Streeter Seidell have appeared in the Prank War series of videos, in which the two play a series of escalating practical jokes on each other. Seidell has described how some of the pranks "showed Amir's true colors, his desire to be famous ... [and] cut deeper emotionally", and how he thought Blumenfeld's faking a marriage proposal from Seidell to his girlfriend went "too far". After seven videos were posted over two years, there was an 18-month hiatus culminating in Seidell tricking Blumenfeld into thinking he had won USD$500,000 after taking a blindfolded half-court basketball shot. The pranks have led to Seidell and Blumenfeld being interviewed by Wired magazine and appearing on Jimmy Kimmel Live!.

In 2009, Blumenfeld starred in The CollegeHumor Show on MTV along with eight other CollegeHumor employees. The staff members wrote, filmed and starred in the show, which is set in the CollegeHumor offices and has a scripted reality premise. Structured as a half-hour sitcom, it incorporates sketches that had already been published online. However, the show was lambasted by critics—Pajiba's Dustin Rowles called it "a series of atrocious sketches haphazardly strung together"; GigaOM's Liz Shannon Miller said the show was "deeply disappointing", and that although Blumenfeld's character is "the iconic face of the web site ... none of the other personalities on the show have been developed beyond the surface level"—only one season, consisting of six episodes, was made.

From 2009 to 2012, Seidell and Blumenfeld hosted Pranked, an MTV series featuring pranks recorded on video and posted online. The show generally received poor reviews, with critics looking down on its clip show format and use of content from YouTube, and calling it inferior to the "prank war" that inspired it. The Michigan Daily's Eric Chiu said "Hosts Blumenfeld and Seidell do what they can with their material, but their banter and commentary is mostly forgettable", and "the Prank War series on CollegeHumor.com is a perfect example of discomforting gags done right ... It's a shame that Pranked can't muster up anything near the same level of ingenuity."

In the July 19, 2017 episode of Blumenfeld and Hurwitz's podcast If I Were You for which Seidell was the guest, the two founders of Prank War publicly confirmed that the series was staged.

=== Jake and Amir ===
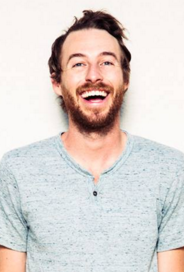
Blumenfeld's comedy partner Jake Hurwitz in 2014

Blumenfeld met his colleague Jake Hurwitz in 2006, when the latter began an internship at CollegeHumor. The two were seated across from each other, and began to make short videos together, which they uploaded to the video-sharing website Vimeo. Their first video was called "Quick Characters": it was unscripted, and involved either Hurwitz or Blumenfeld spontaneously pointing a camera at the other and instructing them to act in a certain way.

The two later began the web series Jake and Amir, episodes of which they posted to jakeandamir.com. In it, Hurwitz plays Jake, a "normal guy", and Blumenfeld plays Amir, his annoying and obsessive co-worker, who craves Jake's attention. Their videos began to be promoted on CollegeHumor, and the website later adopted the series.

External videos
- Amir Blumenfeld's nomination reel for the Webby Awards

Blumenfeld has described how his character "sort of evolved" from being "super needy [and] weird" to "a little crazier", but that "the root of my character is still the same, the insecurity of it". Regarding his similarity to his character, he said he is "hopefully very different but maybe at the root of it we're the same person. I'm probably a little smarter than the character though. Maybe the things that he thinks I also think but I'm able to suppress them."

At the 14th Webby Awards in 2010, Jake and Amir won a People's Voice award for Comedy: Long Form or Series, and Blumenfeld won one for Best Individual Performance. Blumenfeld received a nomination for the 2013 Streamy Awards for Best Male Performance: Comedy because of his role in Jake and Amir.

=== If I Were You ===
On May 13, 2013, Blumenfeld and Hurwitz announced their first new project since Jake and Amir: a comedy audio podcast called If I Were You, in which they give advice to listeners who submit questions. Kayla Culver of The Concordian lauded the podcast as "comfortable to listen to" and "genuinely funny" and said "It's like listening to two best friends having a hilarious conversation on the couch next to you." The Guardian's Miranda Sawyer called If I Were You "a typical example of a comedy podcast" and "amiable enough", but said it contained "far too much laughing", commenting that "New Yorkers Jake and Amir laugh and laugh, giggle and chortle their way around a topic" and "if I wanted stream-of-consciousness waffle with the occasional funny line, I'd listen to [my small children]."

=== Lonely and Horny ===
In 2016, Blumenfeld and Hurwitz released an on-demand comedy series called Lonely and Horny on Vimeo. The series was picked up by CollegeHumor for its second season.

=== HeadGum ===
Blumenfeld and Hurwitz's experience in podcasting led them to founding the podcasting network HeadGum, which hosts 75 unique shows as of January 2026.

=== Buckets with Amir Blumenfeld ===
In August 2018, Blumenfeld announced that he started the podcast Buckets with Amir Blumenfeld, where he discusses the NBA with guests.

=== Other work ===
Blumenfeld starred in the 2009 short film The Old Man and the Seymour alongside colleagues Streeter Seidell and Dan Gurewitch, as well as Shawn Harrison, Liz Cackowski and Jordan Carlos. It is about a growth-hormone deficient man who is mistaken for a student at his nephew's high school. The movie was chosen as a "Staff Pick" on Vimeo, and screened at the Austin Film Festival, the Sacramento Film and Music Festival, the LA Shorts Fest, the Friars Club Comedy Film Festival and the Portable Film Festival.

In 2011, Blumenfeld appeared in comedian Louis C.K.'s television series Louie, during the 10th episode of its second season, entitled "Halloween/Ellie". He played a writer hired to improve a movie script in the second half of the episode. Better With Popcorn's George Prax said that he played "the 'unfunny' guy who actually ends up coming off as the funniest of all to the audience", and that Blumenfeld "should be guesting and starring in many more things". He also called Blumenfeld's first sitcom appearance a "clearly momentous occasion". Blumenfeld also had a part in I Just Want My Pants Back, an MTV show produced by Doug Liman.

He played Kumar Patel's friend Adrian in the 2011 stoner comedy film A Very Harold & Kumar 3D Christmas, alongside Thomas Lennon as Harold Lee's friend Todd. Reviews largely did not remark on his performance, although IGN's Eric Goldman said "there isn't much to the Todd and Adrian scenes", and Pajiba's Daniel Carlson thought the scriptwriters treated the characters as "living props". T. J. Mulligan of Movies on Film commented that "anything Adrian says or does ... elicit[s] a slight chuckle at best". However, Robert Zak of WhatCulture! commended the film's "strong supporting cast", saying that Lennon and Blumenfeld "provid[ed] constant amusement".

As a writer, Blumenfeld works freelance for ESPN The Magazine, and contributed to the ESPN Guide to Psycho Fan Behavior. He also has a section in Mental Floss called "The Curious Comedian".

== Influences ==
Speaking about the role his education had in shaping his humor, Blumenfeld said: "I went to Jewish schools growing up and that's where my sense of humor was cultivated. Everybody was funny." Blumenfeld has said he is influenced by television programs that he watched while growing up, including The Simpsons, Seinfeld, and Saturday Night Live, which he says "taught me how to think ... absurdly ... creatively and originally about jokes that people were making" and make "jokes on jokes". He has cited Larry David as an influence, and also likes Louie and Curb Your Enthusiasm. Blumenfeld has compared the NBC series The Office and Parks and Recreation to Jake and Amir, saying they "have these office workplace dynamics and the situations are funny and the characters are very funny".

== Filmography ==
=== Film ===
Amir Blumenfeld's film appearances
Year	Title	Role	Notes
2009	The Old Man and the Seymour	Lewis Plunkett	Short film
2011	A Very Harold & Kumar 3D Christmas	Adrian	

=== Television ===
Amir Blumenfeld's television appearances
Year	Title	Role	Notes
2009	The CollegeHumor Show	Amir	
2010–2012	Pranked	Co-host	
2011	Louie	Young nervous writer	Episode "Halloween/Ellie"
2012	I Just Want My Pants Back	Hipster guy	Episode "Never Trust a Moonblower"
2012, 2013	Money from Strangers		With Jake Hurwitz; 2 episodes
2018	Adam Ruins Everything	Tevin	Episode "Adam Ruins Flying"
2018	Bobcat Goldthwait's Misfits & Monsters	Leo	Episode: "The Buzzkill"

=== Online video ===
Amir Blumenfeld's online video appearances
Year	Title	Role	Notes
2007–present	Jake and Amir	Amir	Writer and editor
2007–2015	Hardly Working	Amir	Writer
2010–2015	CollegeHumor Originals	Various	
2010	Very Mary-Kate	Woody Allen	2 episodes
2016–2019	Lonely and Horny	Ruby Jade	Writer and actor

== Bibliography ==
- The writers of CollegeHumor.com (2006). The CollegeHumor Guide to College: Selling Kidneys for Beer Money, Sleeping with Your Professors, Majoring in Communications, and Other Really Good Ideas. New York: Penguin Books. ISBN 9780525949398.
- Blumenfeld, Amir; Hall, Spencer; Trex, Ethan (2007). Warren St. John (ed.). ESPN Guide to Psycho Fan Behavior. New York: ESPN Books. ISBN 9781933060361.
- Blumenfeld, Amir; Shah, Neel; Trex, Ethan (2008). Faking It: How to Seem Like a Better Person Without Actually Improving Yourself. New York: New American Library. ISBN 9780451222527.
- The writers of CollegeHumor.com (2011). CollegeHumor: The Website. The Book. New York: Da Capo Press. ISBN 9780306820496.
