= VMK (disambiguation) =

VMK may refer to:

- Virtual Magic Kingdom, a massively multiplayer online game
- Makhuwa-Shirima, the ISO 639-3 code for Makhuwa-Shirima
- Volume Master Key, a special encryption key used to secure the data on a storage device
- vmk, a shorthand for Vmkernel in VMware
- Very Mary-Kate, a web series created by Elaine Carroll
