= Prehype =

American venture development firm

- Type: Privately held company
- Industry: Venture capital
- Founded: September 1, 2010; 16 years ago
- Founders: Henrik Werdelin, Philip Petersen and Stacey Seltzer
- Headquarters: New York City, United States
- Number of locations: 6
- Area served: Worldwide
- Products: Business incubation
- Website: prehype.com

Prehype is an American product innovation and venture capital firm using a process that it calls venture development. Prehype has offices in New York City, London, Copenhagen, and Rio de Janeiro, and was founded by Henrik Werdelin in September 2010.

In addition to venture management services, the firm provides angel investments and access to a network of talent including entrepreneurs, engineers, designers, and developers.

== History ==
Prehype was founded in September 2010 in New York City by Henrik Werdelin, alongside Philip Petersen and Stacey Seltzer. Werdelin conceived of the firm after serving as Vice President of Product Development and Strategy at MTV Networks and as an Entrepreneur-in-Residence at Index Ventures, roles that exposed him to the gap between corporate innovation processes and startup agility.

From its inception, Prehype adopted a venture development model designed to identify “intrapreneurs” within large organisations and guide them through intensive ideation sprints (typically one to four weeks), followed by a three-month build phase and a 100-day customer feedback period. The firm’s revenue model combines a fixed management fee with shared upside in successful ventures.

In its early years, Prehype worked with companies including Diageo, NewsCorp, Mondelez, the Lego Group, and Verizon to develop new products and services. One of its first major spin-outs was BarkBox, a subscription service for dog products launched in September 2011 in partnership with Matt Meeker and Carly Strife.

During the 2010s, the firm’s portfolio expanded to include Basno, Three Spirit, UnionCrate, Penrose Hill, Edwin, FancyHands, and Ro Health. Several Prehype-backed companies were later acquired by larger firms, including Birdseye by Yandex, AND CO by Fiverr, Part Pic by Amazon, Managed by Q by WeWork, Hot Potato by Facebook, Sunrise by Microsoft, Go Try It On by Rent the Runway, and Readmill by Dropbox.

In later years, Prehype broadened its scope to include AI-assisted venture building tools (such as Audos), SaaS-focused spin-outs through Freespin Ventures, and educational initiatives in applied entrepreneurship. It also launched a network of entrepreneurs-in-residence, fellowship programs, and seed investment initiatives. As of the mid-2020s, the firm maintains offices in New York, London, Copenhagen, Sydney, Detroit, and Rio de Janeiro.

== Incubation services ==
The firm's primary line of services involves incubating new startup companies from within large corporations.

With an infrastructure of entrepreneurs, engineers, designers, and developers, Prehype facilitates the incubation process by allowing executives, referred to as intrapreneurs, to build new products and ventures with a handpicked external team.

Prehype pulls these entrepreneurs out of the company for a period of 1–4 weeks and coaches them in bringing a business idea to life. Following this period a new venture is created with a timeline of three months for most projects. Prehype follows up by helping companies receive customer feedback within 100 days of the new product's launch. Prehype charges a fixed management fee, but makes its profits via a shared upside if the project is successful.

The incubation process serves several purposes, the first of which is to retain talent within an organization while allowing employees to function like entrepreneurs, potentially leading to a successful new business. The second goal is to foster a mutually beneficial environment in which the cultures of big companies and startups can learn from one another.

=== After launch ===
Upon the completion of a Prehype project, the company that has contracted the firm's services is given the choice to internalize or spin out the new product as a stand-alone startup.

== Noteworthy projects ==
=== BarkBox ===
Prehype partnered with Matt Meeker and Carly Strife in September 2011 to develop a new business called BarkBox. The Prehype incubated business is a subscription service that delivers monthly boxes of dog products to pet owners. With a model similar to Birchbox, BarkBox collaborates with local vendors to provide products like treats, accessories, and gadgets.
