= Time Traveling Bong =

Miniseries

- Genre: Comedy
- Created by: Ilana Glazer; Paul W. Downs; Lucia Aniello
- Written by: Ilana Glazer; Paul W. Downs; Lucia Aniello
- Directed by: Lucia Aniello
- Starring: Ilana Glazer; Paul W. Downs
- Country of origin: United States
- Original language: English
- No. of episodes: 3

Production
- Executive producers: Ilana Glazer; Paul W. Downs; Lucia Aniello; Dave Becky; Sam Reich
- Production companies: Paulilu; Starr-Pix; 3 Arts Entertainment; Comedy Partners

Original release
- Network: Comedy Central
- Release: April 20 – April 22, 2016

Time Traveling Bong is an American miniseries created and written by Ilana Glazer, Paul W. Downs, and Lucia Aniello. The series, starring Glazer and Downs and directed by Aniello, aired on Comedy Central as a "three-night event" with each episode premiering nightly from April 20, 2016 until April 22, 2016. In syndication, the series airs as a TV movie rather than in episodes.

== Synopsis ==
Two cousins, Sharee and Jeff, discover the titular bong that can be used to travel through time when smoked. After visiting various points in the past, Sharee and Jeff must find a way to return to the present after the bong is damaged.

== Cast ==
- Ilana Glazer as Sharee
- Paul W. Downs as Jeff
- Nathan Barnatt as Clyde
- Kevin Heffernan as Donnie
- DJ Qualls as Future Man
- June Carryl as Future Woman
- Ken Cheeseman as Reverend Hale/Sir Ipswich (Episode 1)

== Production ==
On January 6, 2016, the series was greenlit for a 3-episode order.

== Episodes ==
No.	Title	Directed by	Written by	Original release date	Prod. code	US viewers (millions)
1	"Chapter 1: The Beginning"	Lucia Aniello	Lucia Aniello, Paul W. Downs & Ilana Glazer	April 20, 2016	101	0.614
While riding bikes to a Wawa store, cousins Jeff & Sharee witness a man and woman teleport onto the street in front of them. After the man and woman are immediately run over and killed by a car, Jeff and Sharee find their bong in the bushes. They translate Chinese characters on the bong and learn that it can travel through time and space, and they immediately test it. Jeff uses it and they travel back to prehistoric times, only to return immediately when confronted with a Tyrannosaurus Rex. Sharee uses it and they travel back to Salem, Massachusetts during the Salem witch trials; the locals witness them teleport into town and Sharee is accused of being a witch. A townsman destroys the bong. Jeff takes the bong to the local glassblower while Sharee is stabbed, near-drowned, and tortured. The next day, Jeff gets the bong back from the glassblower, who he was unable to properly fix it, so they can no longer control where they travel. At Sharee's trial, she attempts to testify for herself but when she asks to read a statement she wrote, she is found guilty of being a witch for being a woman who knows how to read and write. At the burning, Jeff convinces the locals to let him start the fire and he uses the torch to teleport him and Sharee out of Salem. Unaware of where they are now located, and out of weed to smoke from the bong, Jeff and Sharee are kidnapped by cavemen as the episode ends.
2	"Chapter 2: The Middle"	Lucia Aniello	Lucia Aniello, Paul W. Downs & Ilana Glazer	April 21, 2016	102	0.444
Jeff and Sharee are forced into sexual situations with a tribe of cavemen. Sharee enjoys her time with the males, but Jeff decides to hide from the women after rough intercourse. Sharee stays in the cave with the tribe while Jeff searches for weed in the area. After finding the weed, Jeff struggles to convince Sharee to leave their current point in time as Sharee confesses she had her first orgasm during their night in the cave. Jeff gets Sharee to travel again, as he is in fear of an approaching cavewoman; they arrive in a cotton field where they convince a group of slaves to travel with them and they travel again to Gary, Indiana in 1963. The slaves enlist in the military to go to war in Vietnam, while Jeff and Sharee come up with a plan to kidnap Michael Jackson in order to save his childhood. Jeff and Sharee decide to live the remainder of their lives in 1963, pretending to be husband and wife while raising Michael Jackson as their son. After a few weeks in the 60s, they decide to return Michael Jackson to his home and smoke out of the bong again. The episode ends as they arrive in Ancient Greece.
3	"Chapter 3: The End...?"	Lucia Aniello	Lucia Aniello, Paul W. Downs & Ilana Glazer	April 22, 2016	103	0.278
The cousins arrive in Ancient Greece, where they enjoy the people, wine, and intimacies. The Greeks host an orgy that night, and during both Jeff & Sharee decide they want to remain there forever, but change their minds when they wake up next to each other uncertain of whether or not they had sex the night before. They travel again, this time to the future, where everything in the world has been reduced to a massive junkyard because of corporate mergers and Citizens United v. FEC. The cousins encounter escapees from the corporation, who created the time traveling bong originally as a way of undoing the past. Sharee is taken captive; Jeff enters the corporate headquarters where Sharee is held captive, soon to be executed. Jeff masturbates onto the computer system, crashing it to create a diversion. He and Sharee escape back to where they started after Sharee uses her hair instead of marijuana. She breaks up with her boyfriend upon returning, and the cousins share what they learned from their adventure. They bury the bong in the backyard. Their dog starts to dig it up as the screen fades to black.
