= Kathryn Craft =

American novelist

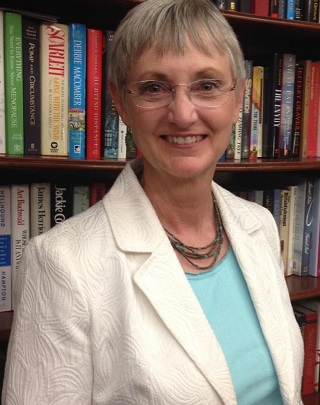
- Born: September 9, 1956 (age 69); Syracuse, New York, U.S.
- Education: Dulaney High School; Miami University (BS, MA)
- Occupation: Novelist
- Writing career
- Period: 2011–present
- Genre: Literary fiction
- Website: www.kathryncraft.com

Kathryn Craft (born September 9, 1956) is an American author of literary fiction and contemporary women's fiction.

== Early life and education ==
Kathryn Graham was born on September 9, 1956, in Syracuse, New York and graduated from Dulaney High School in 1974. She later attended Miami University and graduated with a BS in Biological Sciences Education in 1978. She later obtained M.A. in Health and Physical Education with a dance concentration in 1980.

== Working career ==
After college, Craft worked as a dancer, choreographer, and movement instructor from 1978 to 1992 and also was a freelance dance critic for The Morning Call in Allentown, Pennsylvania until 2002. She also owned a business that created marketing materials for small businesses and nonprofit groups called Themes & Variations.

Craft also served in various leadership capacities for the Women's Fiction Writer's Association, the Philadelphia Writer's Conference, and the Greater Lehigh Valley Writers Group.

Since 2007, Craft has been the editor and owner of Writing-Partner.com.

== Writing career ==
On October 20, 1997, Craft's husband had a 12-hour standoff with the police that ended up with his suicide. She initially wanted to write a memoir of her life, but her focus continually returned to her husband's standoff with the police. The events had changed her, and she understood that her life would never be the same. In 2000, Craft started writing fiction and her first novel took on the subject of eating disorders in the female dance community. The process took eight years, and the outcome was a novel called "The Art of Falling". The book's lead character, Penny, is pushed to the edge of despair, and this helped Craft forgive her husband in some way and helped to bring the events of 1997 into a cathartic experience for Craft.

After writing The Art of Falling, Craft decided to novelize the events of her husband's death and suicide. She wrote her second novel, "The Far End of Happy" in over ten months. The novel's events take place during 12 hours and are told through the eyes of family members.

== Personal ==
Craft lives in Doylestown, Pennsylvania with her husband.

== Bibliography ==
=== Novels ===
- The Art of Falling (2014)
- The Far End of Happy (2015)
