= Streeter Seidell =

American comedian, writer, and actor (born 1982)

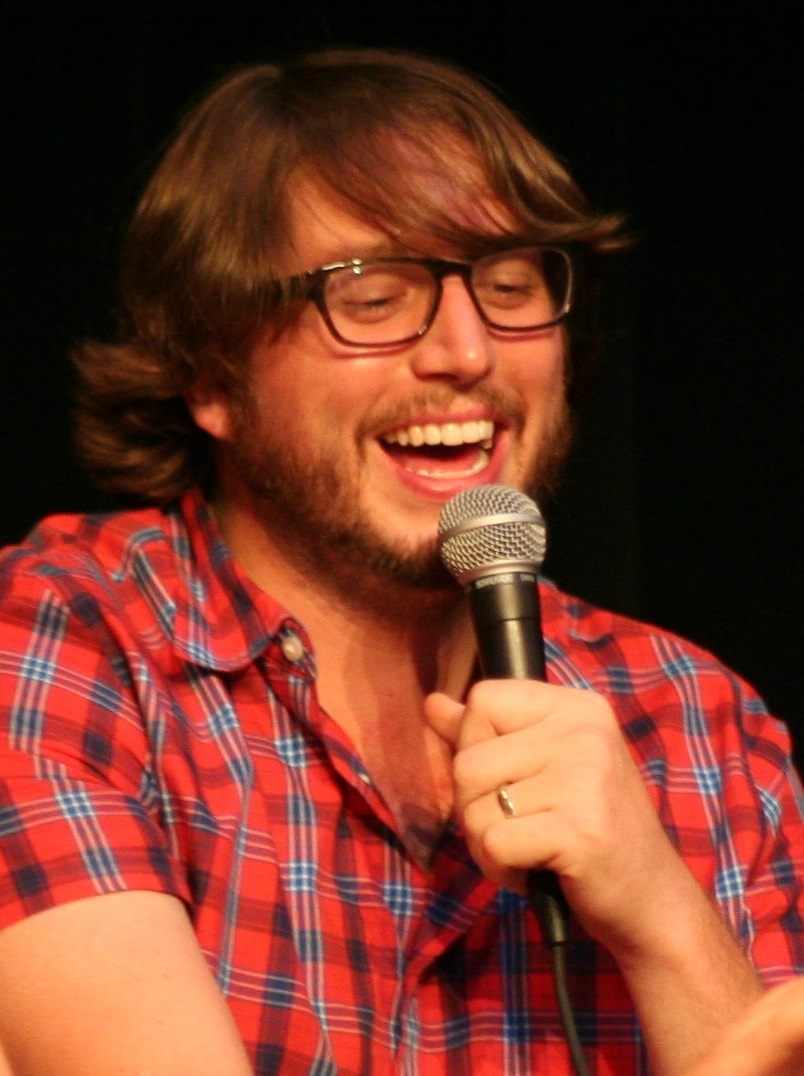
- Seidell in 2012
- Born: Streeter John Seidell; December 2, 1982 (age 43); New Haven, Connecticut, United States
- Notable work: Saturday Night Live, The CollegeHumor Show

Comedy career
- Years active: 2004–present
- Subjects: Body image, Pop Culture, Nerd culture
- Website: StreeterSeidell.com

Streeter John Seidell (born December 2, 1982) is an American comedian, writer, actor, and TV host. Seidell was part of the cast of CollegeHumor's online sketches. His video series Prank Wars was viewed tens of millions of times, which eventually led to a TV-series called Pranked on MTV with fellow CollegeHumor editor Amir Blumenfeld.

In 2014, Seidell joined the writing staff of the NBC variety show Saturday Night Live. In 2022, he was promoted to head writer.

== Education and background ==
Raised in Madison, Connecticut, Seidell attended Daniel Hand High School between 1997 and 2001. After high school Seidell moved to New York and graduated from Fordham University in 2005 with a B.A. in communications.

He is married to Vanessa Bone and has a sister named Heidi.

== Career ==
=== CollegeHumor.com ===
Seidell was hired to work for CollegeHumor.com in 2004 as one of the original line-up of staff for the site. He was in charge of editing the site's front page. He also wrote for the Hardly Working series. Seidell's characters are now under the name Streeter Theeter.

==== The CollegeHumor Show ====
The Hardly Working series was adapted into a TV sitcom format by MTV. It portrays the usual Hardly Working style of comedy, in which the staff acts out fictionalized versions of themselves in their usual office in New York. The show premiered on February 9, 2009. The show was not picked up for a second season.

=== Saturday Night Live ===
Seidell was hired as a writer by Saturday Night Live in 2014 and promoted to supervising writer in 2017, and then head writer in early 2022. His writing partner on SNL is Mikey Day. Sketches of note include the "Close Encounter" series with Kate McKinnon, the "Poolboy" series with Pete Davidson, "Haunted Elevator (ft. David S. Pumpkins)" with Tom Hanks, "Beavis and Butt-Head" with Ryan Gosling, the "Washington's Dream" series with Nate Bargatze, and the sketch "Sister".

=== Disney ===
Seidell and Day have two projects in development for Disney with one already released. A sixth film in the Home Alone franchise titled Home Sweet Home Alone was released exclusively on Disney+ on November 12, 2021. A live-action Inspector Gadget film is in pre-production, as well as a SpaceCamp remake produced by Walt Disney Pictures.

=== Other appearances and projects ===
In the short film The Old Man and the Seymour, Seidell plays Seymour Plunkett, an orphan who gets adopted by his hormonally deficient uncle (Amir Blumenfeld) after his father dies. Seidell is featured on the History Channel show I Love the 1880s, where he and many other comedians provide humorous commentary on historical facts and trivia.

Seidell wrote White Whine: A Study of First World Problems. Published on October 1, 2013, the book consists of chapters detailing various luxuries, and why the people who complain about them in a certain way are considered "White Whiners." Each chapter ends with social networking posts by said Whiners.

Seidell launched his podcast, The Talk of Shame Show on May 15, 2014. The podcast has a guest every week to discuss shameful stories of their past, and also includes a fan-submitted story. The show has had several other CollegeHumor writers on it, such as Jake Hurwitz, Amir Blumenfeld, and Dan Gurewitch.

Seidell has also written for the New York Times, Mental Floss, Metro NY and Men's Fitness. He also co-wrote the book, The CollegeHumor Guide to College: Selling Kidneys for Beer Money, Sleeping with Your Professors, Majoring in Communications, and Other Really Good Ideas, along with other CollegeHumor writers and editors. Seidell was also a writer for the ABC sitcom Trophy Wife.

=== Awards ===
Seidell was listed as the fifth entry in Variety's "10 Screenwriters to Watch in 2021" list.

He has been nominated for seven Primetime Emmy awards, all in the "Outstanding Writing for a Variety Series" category. He has also won Writers Guild of America awards in 2017 and 2018.
