= Sister (comedy sketch) =

2026 Saturday Night Live segment

- Saturday Night Live sketch
- Written by: Streeter Seidell; Mikey Day; Simon Rich; Chase Rosenberg
- Cast: Tommy Brennan; Mikey Day; Andrew Dismukes; Ben Marshall; John Mulaney; Kenan Thompson; Jane Wickline
- Original air date: November 14, 2026

"Sister" is a comedy sketch about elder care that first aired on the November 14, 2026 episode of Saturday Night Live. It featured guest host John Mulaney, and was a parody advertisement for a care option called "Sister", in which the adult son of an elderly father relied on his sister to attend to their father's needs. The sketch quickly became a viral video and sparked widespread discussion of issues related to care of elderly parents by their adult children, particularly their adult daughters.

== Premise ==
The three-minute sketch proceeds as a parody of pharmaceutical advertising and the state of American elder care. Three men (John Mulaney, Andrew Dismukes, Kenan Thompson) faced with an aging parent and the expensive medical attention they need, offer testimonials of a service called Sister, which entails their own sisters assuming responsibility for the parents' care. The brothers speak highly of how Sister saves them from the financial and emotional burden of their aging parents, while their sisters accept that burden due to internalized sexism. One of the sisters (Jane Wickline) quits her own job, moves across the country and endures her father's demeaning comments, while her brother brags about how Sister allows him and his father to grow closer by critiquing her efforts. The sketch ends by advertising the add-on service of Sister's Husband, who reluctantly supports the sister's caregiving despite the unfair imbalance of labor.

=== Creation ===
The sketch was written by Streeter Seidell and Mikey Day, with SNL writer Chase Rosenberg and guest writer Simon Rich. All are men besides Rosenberg, who is non-binary. Seidell dedicated it to his own sister, Heidi.

== Reception ==
The sketch received acclaim from critics. It was called the best segment of the episode in reviews by LateNighter and Vulture. A writer for The Guardian referred to it as "the best commercial sketch the show has done in a long while." Articles for CNET and Slate called the sketch an "instant, painful classic" and "its best—and most brutal—sketch in a long time", respectively. In the Los Angeles Times, writer Lisa McCarty noted that the segment was "brutally accurate".

"Sister" went viral. Within two days, it received 4 million views on YouTube, and was widely shared via email and other social media. The overall episode it aired on was the lowest watched of the season to that point, with Nielsen ratings estimating an average of 4.5 million viewers for the broadcast.

To groups focused on elder care in particular, the sketch provided a discussion point for broader issues in the field. The AARP spotlighted these issues, citing statistics that said 3 in 5 caregivers in the US are women, with more than 50 million Americans involved with unpaid caregiving for elderly relatives. The New York Times cited sociological research by Angelina Grigoryeva indicating that daughters, dedicated an average of 14 hours per month to care for ailing parents, whereas sons only spent 6 hours per month. Grigoryeva's research also indicated that the gender inequity increased in cases featuring a parent with both at least one son and daughter. Advocacy groups in British Columbia, Minnesota, and Washington D.C. used the sketch as a jumping off point for speaking about their programs.

US Senator Andy Kim (D-NJ) described watching "Sister" as a "jarring experience"—with how it connected to his own experience caring for his father with Alzheimer's disease—and praised its depiction of "unfair, sexist gender roles". Representative Gwen Moore (D-WI) and Representative-elect Denise Powell (D-NE) recognized the challenge of improving home elder care in the context of "Sister", with Moore writing that "Sister has a friend in me!". Melinda French Gates, with her organization Pivotal Ventures, posted a fact check of the sketch on social media. French Gates rated "Sister" as generally true, though she argued that it was misleading in how it underrated the financial and professional burden on female caregivers.

== See also ==
- Tokyo Story, a 1953 Japanese film that explores similar themes
