= Derek Westerman =

American film director

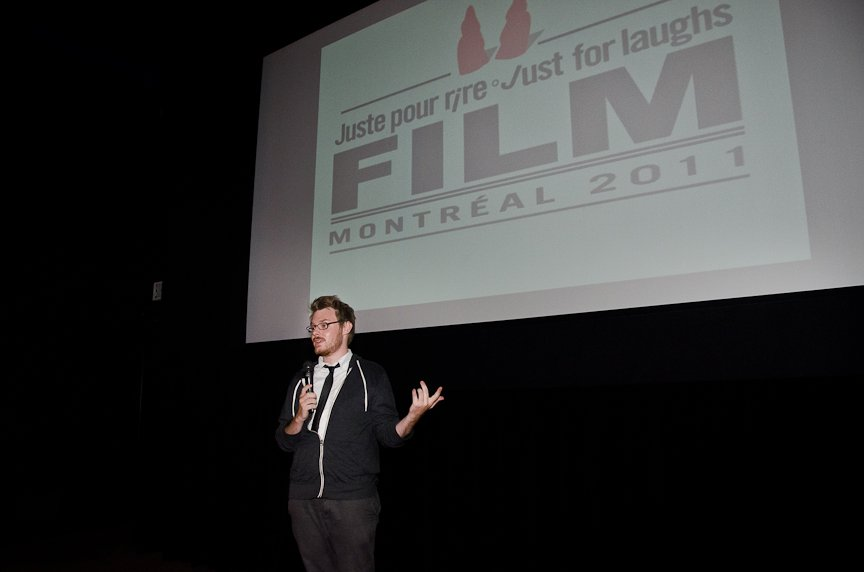
- Westerman speaks at 2011 Just for Laughs Comedy Festival
- Born: Toledo, Ohio
- Occupations: Film director, producer, screenwriter
- Known for: Bad Dads

Derek Westerman is an American screenwriter, film director, and film producer born and raised in Toledo, Ohio. His debut work was the independent web comedy series Bad Dads, a series of five, three-minute shorts featuring Michael Cera and Will Hines, which premiered on the website CollegeHumor during its 2011 Spring Season of original web shows. Bad Dads premiered at the Dallas International Film Festival, Palm Springs International Festival of Short Films, L.A. Comedy Shorts Film Festival, and was featured at the 2011 Just for Laughs comedy festival in Chicago, Illinois and Montreal, Quebec.

Westerman has worked with many comedians of Upright Citizens Brigade and wrote sketch comedy with Michael Cera while he was involved in the filming of Arrested Development. His senior thesis film from Loyola Marymount University starred Clark Duke alongside Michael Cera. He attended film school at Loyola Marymount University from 2002 to 2006 in Los Angeles, California and received his master's degree in Visual Culture Theory in 2010 from NYU. In 2019, Westerman partnered with screenwriter Yolanda Ruiz to create Ruiz Westerman Screenwriting Services. He currently lives in Los Angeles, California.
