= Chad (Saturday Night Live) =

Fictional character from Saturday Night Live

- Saturday Night Live character
- First appearance: "Season 41, Episode 18"; April 16, 2016
- Last appearance: 50th Anniversary Special; February 16, 2025
- Created by: Pete Davidson; Streeter Seidell; Mikey Day
- Portrayed by: Pete Davidson

In-universe information
- Gender: Male
- Occupation: Various

Chad is a fictional character from Saturday Night Live, portrayed by Pete Davidson.

== Background ==
The character was created by Davidson, Streeter Seidell, and Mikey Day, and is played by Davidson. The name Chad has been used during the last couple of decades as slang for a range of male stereotypes, which the SNL character plays on ironically.

He first appears in the sketch "Pool Boy," which is part of the episode that aired on April 16, 2016, in which he is depicted as the 23-year-old pool boy of a housewife named Mrs. Handler (Julia Louis-Dreyfus), who has an affair with him. In the sketch, Mrs. Handler dramatically breaks off the affair with Chad, wanting to protect both their families from the scandal and citing her own personal conflict; Chad responds with little enthusiasm or care, and twice ignores Mrs. Handler to continue cleaning up the pool.

== Personality ==
Chad is an easily distracted, chill, apathetic man. He has no known last name. In the sketch "Pool Boy," it is stated that he is 23. Many of the sketches depict him as doing various things such as going to a Narnia-like world through his closet, being targeted by a serial killer, going to a haunted mansion, touring with RuPaul, and going on a SpaceX mission. He is oblivious to the things that are about to happen to him, and usually just responds with "OK" or "cool." He is usually well-liked by other characters, and even unintentionally saves the world in his SpaceX sketch. In other sketches, Chad becomes the target of affection of various individuals, typically the celebrity host, such as his tutor, doctor, or Jennifer Lopez, who similarly to Mrs. Handler, confess their love of Chad and personal problems while he reacts apathetically.

== Reception ==
Chad was generally well received by different sources. Entertainment Tonight described the character as "hilariously stupid," and Rolling Stone described him as a "stereotypical stoner bro".
