= Sam Reich =

American media proprietor and comedian (born 1984)

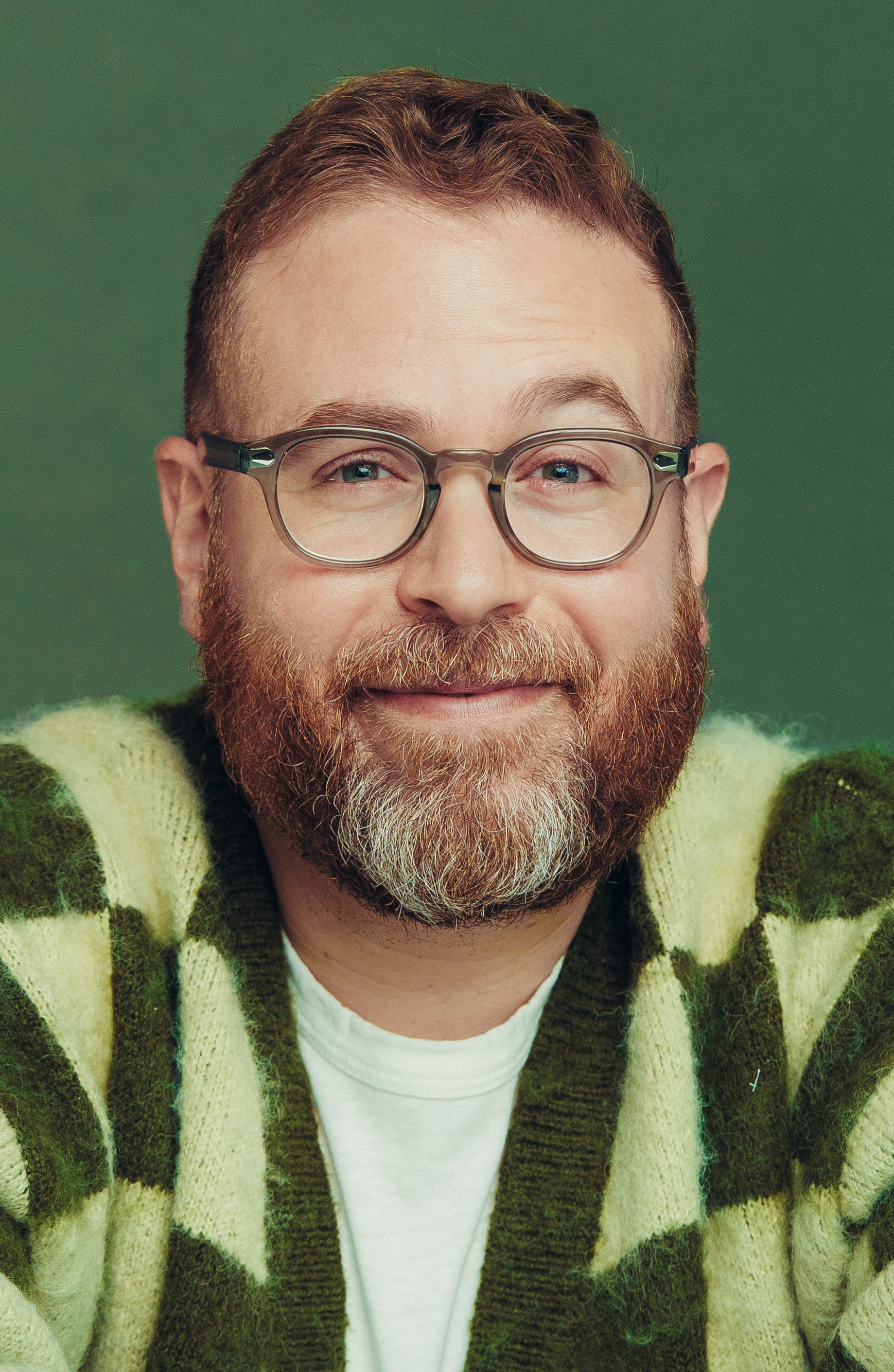
- Reich in 2024
- Born: July 22, 1984 (age 42); Cambridge, Massachusetts, U.S.
- Occupations: Film producer; director; writer; comedian; actor
- Title: CEO of CHMedia (2020–present)
- Spouse: Elaine Carroll (m. 2011)
- Parents: Robert Reich; Clare Dalton
- Website: www.samreich.com

Samuel Dalton Reich (/raɪʃ/; born July 22, 1984) is an American media proprietor, writer, producer, comedian, and actor. He is best known for his work with Dropout (formerly CollegeHumor), of which he is chief executive officer (CEO) and majority stakeholder; he hosts its shows Game Changer and Make Some Noise.

== Early life ==
Reich was born on July 22, 1984, to Robert Reich, a lawyer who would later be appointed Secretary of Labor under Bill Clinton, and Clare Dalton, a law professor at Northeastern University. He grew up in Cambridge, Massachusetts. His brother, Adam Reich, is a sociology professor at Columbia University.

== Career ==
In 2000, Reich dropped out of Buckingham Browne & Nichols School as a result of clinical depression and in order to pursue acting. Shortly thereafter, he moved to New York and founded the comedy group Dutch West, which focused on making comedy videos for the Internet. After being discovered by CollegeHumor in 2006, he was hired as Director of Original Content. He was then promoted to President of Original Content along with the premiere of The CollegeHumor Show on MTV in 2009.

In 2014, Reich founded Big Breakfast, CollegeHumor's offshoot production company, and moved CollegeHumor's video team to Los Angeles. The company has since produced Adam Ruins Everything on TruTV; Middle of the Night Show on MTV; Time Traveling Bong on Comedy Central; The Britishes on DirecTV; I Want My Phone Back on Comcast's Watchable; Bad Internet and Rhett and Link's Buddy System on YouTube Red.

With CollegeHumor, he collaborated on music videos with "Weird Al" Yankovic and United States First Lady Michelle Obama.

On January 8, 2020, it was announced that Reich was acquiring CollegeHumor from IAC which was transformed to the entity of CHMedia. This included the streaming service Dropout. At the time that IAC sold CollegeHumor, Reich asked fans to support the company by purchasing subscriptions to the streaming service. In 2020, Kate Knibbs of Wired commented that "Reich is beloved within the CollegeHumor community—WIRED spoke with more than a dozen former employees, and the praise was unanimously effusive, rare for someone who just laid a bunch of people off". Reich oversees the content created in Dropout and hosts some of the shows including Game Changer and Make Some Noise.

In 2023, Reich announced that the CollegeHumor brand name would be retired and rebranded to Dropout, to coincide with the streaming service.

== Personal life ==
Since 2011, Reich has been married to actress and writer Elaine Carroll, whom he met during summer camp in 2000. Together, they have collaborated on the web series Very Mary-Kate. In 2024, Reich stated that he and Carroll "both identify as like, a little queer".

== Filmography ==
Year	Title	Role	Network	Notes
2006–present	CollegeHumor Originals	Executive producer, Director, Writer, Actor	CollegeHumor	Digital series
2006–2008	Street Fighter: The Later Years	Executive producer, Director, Writer	CollegeHumor	Digital series, 9 episodes
2007–2015	Jake and Amir	Executive producer, Director, Actor	CollegeHumor	Digital series
2006–2009	Prank War	Executive producer	CollegeHumor	Digital series, 8 episodes
2009	The CollegeHumor Show	Executive producer, Director, Writer, Actor	MTV	Television series, 6 episodes
2011–2012	Troopers	Executive producer, Director, Actor	CollegeHumor	Digital series, 13 episodes
2010–2013	Very Mary-Kate	Executive producer, Director, Writer	CollegeHumor	Digital series
2013	Precious Plum	Executive producer, Director, Writer	CollegeHumor	Digital series, 13 episodes
2014	The Britishes	Executive producer, Director, Writer	DirecTV	Television series, 8 episodes
2015	Middle of the Night Show	Executive producer	MTV	Television series, 9 episodes
2016	I Want My Phone Back	Executive producer	Watchable	Digital series, 10 episodes
2016	Time Traveling Bong	Executive producer	Comedy Central	Television series, 3 episodes
2016	Bad Internet	Executive producer	YouTube Red	Digital series, 10 episodes
2016	Rhett and Link's Buddy System	Executive producer	YouTube Red	Digital series, 9 episodes
2014–2019	Adam Ruins Everything	Executive producer, Actor	TruTV	Television series, 27 episodes
2018–present	Dimension 20	Executive producer, Player	Dropout	Digital series
2019–present	Game Changer	Executive producer, Director, Host, Player	Dropout	Digital series, 71 episodes
2022–present	Make Some Noise	Executive producer, Director, Host, Player	Dropout	Digital series, 62 episodes
2022	Dirty Laundry	Himself	Dropout	Season 1: "Who Shot a Softcore Porn?"
2024	Thousandaires	Himself	Dropout	Season 1: "Be Humble, Keep It Vague, and Repeat"
2024	Adventuring Academy	Himself	Dropout	Season 5: "Bugs Bunny and Daffy Duck"
2024	Gastronauts	Himself	Dropout	Season 1: "I Find That Very A-Peeling"
2025	Um, Actually	Himself	Dropout	Season 10: "The Baby Bracket Volume 2"
2025	Puppet History	Actor	Watcher Entertainment	Digital series, 6 episodes
2026	The Rookie	Actor	ABC	Season 8: "Fun and Games" and "Survive the Streets"

== Awards ==
Year	Award	Work
2008	Aspen Rooftop Comedy Award for Best Series	The Michael Showalter Showalter
2008	ECNY for Best Short	"Minesweeper: The Movie"
2010	People's Voice Webby for Best Series	Jake and Amir
2010	Webby for Best Animation	"Pixar Intro Parody"
2010	People's Voice Webby for Best Short	"Web Site Story"
2011	People's Voice Webby for Best Humor Website	CollegeHumor
2012	People's Voice Webby for Best Short	"Simon Pegg and Nick Frost's Star Wars"
2012	Webby for Best Short	"Siri Argument"
2013	Telly Bronze Award	"Mitt Romney Style," "Dora the Explorer Trailer," "Save Greendale"
2013	Telly Silver Award	"Gay Men Will Marry Your Girlfriends"
2013	Webby for Best Short	"Gay Men Will Marry Your Girlfriends"
2014	Telly Bronze Award	"GPS Prank," "HBO Should Show Dongs"
2014	Webby for Best Remix	"Music Videos Without Music"
2014	Webby for Best Short	"Batman vs. the Penguin"
2015	Ursa Major Award for Best Short	"Furry Force"
2015	Telly Bronze Award	"Music Videos without Music"
2015	Telly Silver Award	"Why Engagement Rings Are a Scam," "If Google Was a Guy"
2015	People's Voice Webby for Best Writing	"If Google Was a Guy"
2015	People's Voice Webby for Best Short	"If Google Was a Guy"
2015	Webby for Best Writing	"If Google Was a Guy"
2015	Webby for Best Short	"If Google Was a Guy"
2015	Telly Bronze Award	"FOIL"
2015	Streamy for Best Cover Music Video	"FOIL"
2015	Webby for Best Music Video	"FOIL"
2016	Telly Silver Award	"Go to College Rap"

=== Other awards ===
- Named to Forbes 30 Under 30 in Media Category.
- Named a multi-channel network 40 Under 40.
