= Very Mary-Kate =

American comedy web series

- Created by: Elaine Carroll
- Directed by: Sam Reich
- Starring: Elaine Carroll
- Country of origin: United States
- No. of episodes: 71

Production
- Production location: New York City
- Running time: 1–4 minutes

Original release
- Network: CollegeHumor; YouTube
- Release: January 10, 2010

Very Mary-Kate is a web series written/created by Elaine Carroll and directed by Sam Reich. The series consists of 71 episodes, as of January 17, 2013. Each episode runs for approximately 1–4 minutes, featuring comedian Elaine Carroll as Mary-Kate Olsen. The series was originally produced out-of-pocket, but was picked up for its second season by CollegeHumor, allowing Carroll to "pay for lunch for people."

The series premiered January 10, 2010 on Vimeo. The fourth season debuted January 17, 2013 on CollegeHumor and VeryMaryKate.com.

== Plot ==
Very Mary-Kate is the "unofficial biography of everyone's favorite Olsen twin," Mary-Kate Olsen. Carroll's portrayal of Olsen takes several well-known facts of Mary-Kate Olsen's life (such as attending NYU and picking up occasional acting jobs) and "expands on them, creating a character who's a weak-yet-demanding kitten obsessed with calories, abusing her bodyguard and getting her hands on the good drugs." The series follows the adventures of Carroll's Mary-Kate Olsen including daily routines, religious experiences, major life decisions (moving out from an apartment shared with twin sister Ashley Olsen, deciding to have a baby, and more) and general troublesome situations in which Mary-Kate seems to find herself. Mary-Kate often indulges in smoothies and power drinks that are infused with some variety of a psycho-pharmaceutical adulterant such as Mango Klonopin smoothies, Celexa Mimosas and Paxil-Paxil Protein Shakes.

== Main characters ==
- Elaine Carroll as Mary-Kate Olsen – one-half of the famous Olsen twin duo who has a bodyguard-turned-personal-assistant-and-caretaker; occasionally takes classes at NYU; is obsessed with calories and loves prescription medication cocktails. Mary-Kate splits her time between New York City and Los Angeles, but may not be exactly sure where she is most of the time. She also loves to be on Twitter and Facebook, and is constantly saying things with the words "dash", "dot com" and "dot H T M L".
- Elaine Carroll as Ashley Olsen – Mary-Kate's twin sister; similar in body to Mary-Kate, but is reasonable and mature, which causes her to be the straight foil and the source of an off-and-on sibling rivalry.
- Luke Sholl as Bodyguard – Mary-Kate's unnamed bodyguard who becomes more like a personal assistant/caretaker/nanny/legal guardian, who is supposed to be available at any and all times; he works for Ashley when Mary-Kate fires him before re-hiring him.
- Will Hines as Phil Bines aka "Fat Professor" – Professor of History at NYU; hobbies include mapmaking and bicycling. He has an average BMI, participated in a half-marathon in 2009, and has tenure.
- Josh Ruben as Philip Seymour Hoffman – actor; begins as Mary-Kate's acting coach, but begins appearing at her apartment unannounced and making perverse phone calls to Mary-Kate.
- Limor Hakim as Limor aka "Jewish Looking Girl" – A student in Mary-Kate's class at NYU who "looks very Jewish", which Mary-Kate loves to point out. She dresses in all black and plays guitar in a band. She seems to have a lot of disdain for Mary-Kate, but might be her friend somehow. She is friends with Mary-Kate on Facebook.
- Amir Blumenfeld as Woody Allen – director, actor, screenwriter, author, playwright; the twins' godfather and butt of "old" jokes.
- Brandon Scott Jones as Olivier Sarkozy – the half-brother of the former president of France, Nicolas Sarkozy. He starts dating Mary-Kate later in the series, mirroring their real-life counterparts' relationship.

== Production ==
According to an interview with The Arcade, Carroll originally used an impression of the Olsen twins during an audition for Saturday Night Live. Carroll indicates that, "It went over really well," but "obviously I didn't get on the show." She continued to do the impression, and decided to expand it into a series to put on the internet. In other interviews, Carroll states that she had been doing the Olsen twin impression for about two years before making a short video called "The Olsen Twin Minute" that "featured Mary-Kate and Ashley in a talk show." The experience led Carroll to realize she wanted to do more with the twin impression and "started trying to visualize what life is like for them. They're rich and famous, but also kind of mysterious and private, which leaves a ton of room for the imagination."

== Reception and reviews ==
Very Mary-Kate has received positive reviews. Very Mary-Kate has inspired a variety of fan tributes, including Halloween costumes and a variety of images portraying fans posing in the limp-wristed, hunched posture of Carroll's Mary-Kate Olsen, making the signature facial expression, posted to the Very Mary-Kate Facebook page.

The Arcade states that, "Elaine has brought one of the funniest and best web-series to the internet. Her performance as the rich teen princess and her rich teen princess twin sister is flawless, (flawless in the sense that we've never met the Olsen twins but we've always assumed that they acted just as Elaine portrays them). Less than two minutes in length, each episode is guaranteed to have you laughing within the first 12 seconds (how exact!) and you will no doubt be hooked as we were and will certainly need to check out more of her stuff."

Liz Shannon Miller of GigaOM writes, "Suffice it to say that the Valley-girl-transplanted-to-SoHo portrayal is thus incredibly harsh, but unless you're actually Mary-Kate Olsen, I defy you not to laugh. Production values are low and the sound quality is less than impressive, but the informal nature of the videos work, and the tightly-paced episodes fit a whole lot of painfully funny jokes into just one minute. The exchanges between her and her bodyguard are especially funny thanks to his defeated nature—the pair make for a truly engaging odd couple."

== Web presence ==
Utilizing various social media tools, Very Mary-Kate has maintained a steady internet presence since its inception. The show's characters can be found tweeting regularly on Twitter. The @VeryMaryKate Twitter account has been running since April 2009 and "provides no shortage of great one-liners and increases the show's social networking component." The show also maintains a YouTube profile, but all videos and information premiere first on CollegeHumor, along with site exclusives and videos not shown on YouTube.
