= BarkBox =

Dog toy and treat subscription box

BarkBox, Inc.
- Company type: E-commerce, subscription service
- Traded as: Public
- Headquarters: New York, New York, United States
- Area served: US and Canada
- Founders: Carly Strife; Matt Meeker; Henrik Werdelin
- CEO: Matt Meeker
- Revenue: ▲$365 million(2020)
- Employees: 450
- Website: www.barkbox.com
- Launched: December 2011; 14 years ago

BarkBox is a monthly subscription business providing dog products, services, and experiences. Bark serves over two million dogs monthly through BarkBox and Super Chewer subscriptions and retail distribution.

On December 17, 2020, Barkbox, Inc. and Northern Star Acquisition Corp. (NYSE: STIC.U), a publicly traded special purpose acquisition company, announced that they had entered into a definitive merger agreement. As a result of the transaction, which values the Company at an enterprise value of approximately $1.6 billion, Bark will become a publicly listed company on the New York Stock Exchange under the new ticker symbol, "BARK".

== History ==
The company was founded December 2011 by Carly Strife, Matt Meeker, and Henrik Werdelin. Prior to co-founding BarkBox, Meeker co-founded the social networking site Meetup.com. Meeker is CEO. Werdelin had founded Prehype.

In April 2013, the company raised $6.7 million in a venture funding. The company surpassed the $25 million revenue run rate the same year. Bark received an additional $15 Million in Series B funding led by Resolute.vc, along with RRE, BoxGroup, Lerer Ventures, Bertelsmann Digital Media Investments, Slow Ventures, Daher Capital, CAA, Vast Ventures, and City National Bank in 2014.

Bark launched BarkCam in early 2014, a photo sharing app which operates as an "Instagram for dogs" and their owners.

BarkBox allows owners to personalize their dog's monthly subscription boxes based on their dog's needs. Each dog is unique and requires different toy options to match their style of play.

== Products and services ==
- BarkBox, a monthly subscription service for dogs. Each BarkBox has at least 2 toys, 2 treats, and a chew each month, all based on a monthly theme.
- Bark Bright, a dog wellness product line. The company launched the first Bright product in October 2019 with Bright Dental — an enzymatic gel toothpaste and dental chew. Bright Dental received an honorable mention in Fast Company's World Changing Ideas 2020 and a mention in Time's Best Inventions 2019.
- Bark Essentials, every day items for dogs such as a memory foam dog bed with bed sheets and poop bags.
- Bark Eats, a dog-food delivery service launched in March 2020.
- BarkPost, a dog-themed content site.
- BarkBuddy is similar to a "Tinder for dogs", as users can swipe left or right depending on their level of interest in the dog. The free app, available for iPhone and Android, is designed to match humans with dogs up for adoption at nearby shelters, and users can filter choices by gender, location, activity level, age, and size. The app is connected to rescue centers and shelters across the United States and Canada, and there are approximately 300,000 dogs in the database. The app sources many of its adoptable dogs from the pet adoption website Petfinder and from BARK's personal network of shelters and rescue organizations.
- Bark Air, a private jet service for dogs and their owners.
