= 2010 Webby Awards =

US internet awards ceremony

The 14th annual 2010 Webby Awards were held in New York City on June 14, 2010. They were hosted by comedian B. J. Novak, and the lifetime achievement award was given to Vinton Cerf. The awards were judged by the International Academy of Digital Arts and Sciences.

The set design for the show was provided by Tribal DDB Worldwide in an attempt to change the show's image by emphasizing the competitive nature of the awards, calling the ceremony "The Battle for Web Supremacy." EastMedia also altered the website to reflect The People's Voice campaign. As a result, the number of popular votes this year exceeded 900,000 and there were over 1 million site views (10% from social media). As in previous years, the awards ceremony was made available for viewers via the official Webby YouTube channel.

== Nominees and winners ==
(from http://www.webbyawards.com/winners/2010)

Category	Webby Award winner	People's Voice winner	Other nominees
Games	Record Tripping (Archived 7 August 2010 via Wayback); Bell Brothers	FarmVille (Archived 22 May 2010 via Wayback); Zynga	Canabalt (Archived 14 June 2010 via Wayback); Semi Secret Software
Games	Record Tripping (Archived 7 August 2010 via Wayback); Bell Brothers	FarmVille (Archived 22 May 2010 via Wayback); Zynga	Machinarium (Archived 17 June 2010 via Wayback); Amanita Design
Games	Record Tripping (Archived 7 August 2010 via Wayback); Bell Brothers	FarmVille (Archived 22 May 2010 via Wayback); Zynga	Monopoly City Streets (Archived 8 April 2010 via Wayback); Tribal DDB London
Games-Related	TheBeatlesRockBand.com (Archived 12 June 2010 via Wayback); Harmonix Music Systems, Inc.	Game Informer (Archived 17 June 2010 via Wayback); Game Informer Magazine	BioShock 2 (Archived 18 June 2010 via Wayback); Rokkan / 2K Games
Games-Related	TheBeatlesRockBand.com (Archived 12 June 2010 via Wayback); Harmonix Music Systems, Inc.	Game Informer (Archived 17 June 2010 via Wayback); Game Informer Magazine	GameFly (Archived 14 June 2010 via Wayback); GameFly, Inc.
Games-Related	TheBeatlesRockBand.com (Archived 12 June 2010 via Wayback); Harmonix Music Systems, Inc.	Game Informer (Archived 17 June 2010 via Wayback); Game Informer Magazine	Guitar Hero Global Franchise Hub (Archived 10 September 2011 via Wayback); BLITZ Agency
Interactive Advertising - Game or Application	BMW Z4 Augmented Reality (Archived 21 June 2010 via Wayback); Dare	Red Bull Soapbox Racer (Archived 22 July 2010 via Wayback); Less Rain GmbH	Leroy Smith Game (Archived 15 June 2010 via Wayback); Academy
Interactive Advertising - Game or Application	BMW Z4 Augmented Reality (Archived 21 June 2010 via Wayback); Dare	Red Bull Soapbox Racer (Archived 22 July 2010 via Wayback); Less Rain GmbH	The GTI Project (Archived 18 April 2010 via Wayback); Tribal DDB London
Interactive Advertising - Game or Application	BMW Z4 Augmented Reality (Archived 21 June 2010 via Wayback); Dare	Red Bull Soapbox Racer (Archived 22 July 2010 via Wayback); Less Rain GmbH	Verbatim Championship (http://verbatim.imgsrc.co.jp/award/en/); IMG SRC, Inc.
This table is not complete, please help to complete it from material on this page.

== Notes ==
Winners and nominees are generally named according to the organization or website winning the award, although the recipient is, technically, the web design firm or internal department that created the winning site and in the case of corporate websites, the designer's client. Web links are provided for informational purposes, both in the most recently available archive.org version before the awards ceremony and, where available, the current website. Many older websites no longer exist, are redirected, or have been substantially redesigned.
