= CollegeHumor =

American internet comedy company

Connected Ventures, LLC
- Trade name: Dropout
- Formerly: CollegeHumor; CollegeHumor Media
- Type: Private
- Industry: Television and web series production; Streaming service; Entertainment websites
- Founded: December 7, 1999; 26 years ago (CollegeHumor website); August 15, 2006; 20 years ago (incorporation)
- Founders: Josh Abramson; Ricky Van Veen
- Headquarters: Los Angeles, California, U.S.
- Products: Dropout.tv
- Brands: Dropout; CollegeHumor (formerly); Dorkly (sold); Drawfee (sold)
- Owner: Sam Reich (majority); People Incorporated (minority)
- Number of employees: 40 (2025)
- Website: chmedia.com

Connected Ventures, LLC, doing business as Dropout and CH Media (formerly CollegeHumor), is an Internet comedy company based in Los Angeles that produces content for release on its streaming service Dropout as well as YouTube. Dropout content is mainly composed of live play, such as Dimension 20, and improv comedy and panel shows like Game Changer and Make Some Noise. Dropout's series often feature a rotating cast of regular comedians and performers. The streaming platform hosts original programming and does not run advertisements.

In its earlier years operating as an advertising-based business under the name CollegeHumor, the company focused on sketch comedy and scripted content which was posted to their website (CollegeHumor.com) and later YouTube. The CollegeHumor website featured daily original humor videos and articles created by its in-house writing and production team, in addition to user-submitted content. Some popular series produced under the CollegeHumor brand include Jake and Amir, Hardly Working, Adam Ruins Everything, Hot Date, and Very Mary-Kate.

Founded by Josh Abramson and Ricky Van Veen in 1999, CollegeHumor was owned by InterActiveCorp (IAC) from 2006 until 2020, when IAC withdrew funding and the website shut down. While owned by IAC, the company consisted of three main brands: CollegeHumor.com, Drawfee.com, and Dorkly.com. Sam Reich, a performer and former chief creative officer of CollegeHumor, has been CEO since 2020, when he acquired the company from IAC. IAC launched CH Media's streaming service Dropout in 2018. The streaming service includes original series along with the CollegeHumor back catalog of over 1,500 videos. CollegeHumor was rebranded as Dropout in 2023.

== History ==
=== Founding of CollegeHumor (1999–2006) ===
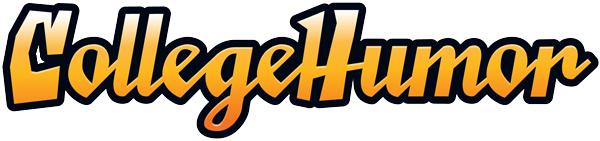
CollegeHumor logo

The CollegeHumor website was created in December 1999 by Josh Abramson and Ricky Van Veen when they were freshmen in college. Abramson and Van Veen were high school friends from Baltimore, Maryland; Abramson was at the University of Richmond and Van Veen was at Wake Forest. They began by posting photos of themselves as well as jokes, links and other material they collected from emails circulating among college students. Within three months the site was receiving over 600,000 visitors per month and $8,000 in monthly revenue. In under a year, they received a buyout offer from an Internet company called eFront for $9 million, most of which would have been financed with stock shares. Abramson and Van Veen refused the offer and continued to grow the company themselves. Abramson said in an interview that they wanted to start an advertisement-based business, seeing the success of other ad-based websites. Their aim was to create a humor site that would appeal to the advertiser-friendly college-aged demographic.

In 2001, they added Jake Lodwick, a student at Rochester Institute of Technology, and Zach Klein, a friend of Van Veen's from Wake Forest. By the time the group graduated from college, the site was attracting 2 million viewers a month and the partners still had full ownership. The group moved the company to San Diego briefly before settling in New York City in 2004, where they set up shop in a 4,800 square-foot loft in TriBeCa. Lodwick and Klein founded Vimeo as a spinoff of CollegeHumor in 2004. In 2006, prior to its acquisition, the CollegeHumor website had "about six million unique visitors per month" with "revenues between $5 and $10 million".

=== Acquisition by IAC and expansion of CH Media (2006–2020) ===
In August 2006, Abramson and company sold 51% of Connected Ventures, CollegeHumor's parent company, whose properties include CollegeHumor, Vimeo and BustedTees, to Barry Diller's IAC for a reported $20 million. After being discovered by CollegeHumor Media in 2006, Sam Reich was hired as director of original content. He was then promoted to president of original content along with the premiere of The CollegeHumor Show on MTV in 2009. While IAC was focused on CollegeHumor's growth, Max Willens of trade magazine Digiday said that CollegeHumor "was only intermittently profitable" throughout its history. The company started to sell merchandise in 2004. In 2006, it began developing original video content, and by 2009 it was licensing original long-form programming to streaming platforms and television networks.

CollegeHumor became known for its original comedy content. The site was nominated for the Webby Award in the humor category in 2007, and many of their individual videos have been nominated for, or won, Webby Awards: winners include "Pixar Intro Parody" for Best Animation, "Web Site Story" for Best Individual Short or Episode, and Jake and Amir for Best Series. Their shorts "Awkward Rap" and "Hand Vagina" were nominated for the Webby Award for Best Comedy: Individual Short or Episode in 2008 and 2009.

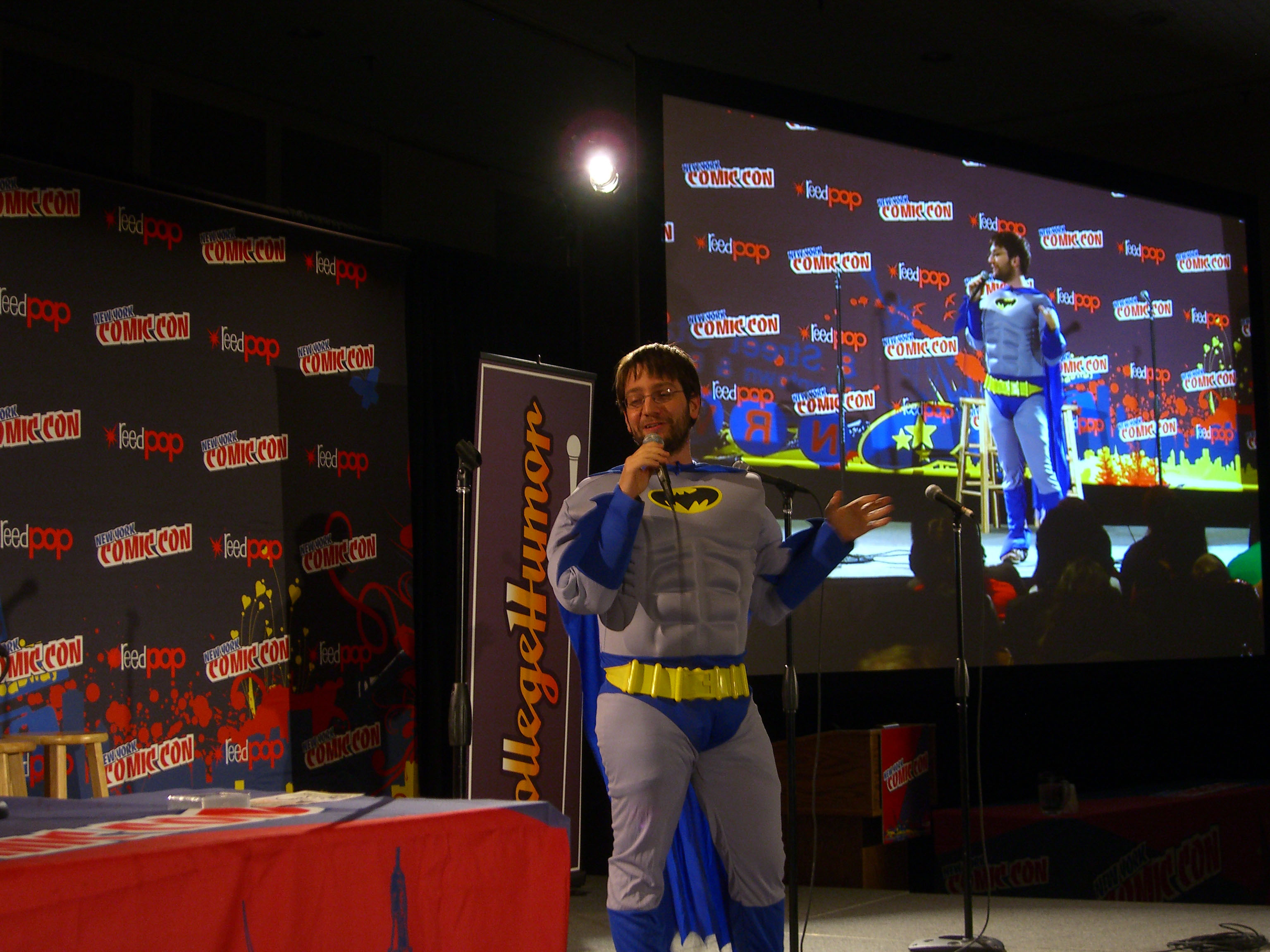
Jeff Rubin at the CollegeHumor presentation at the 2012 New York Comic Con

In 2010, IAC launched Dorkly as a sister website to CollegeHumor; this brand focused on fandoms and video game parodies and was edited by CollegeHumor staff.

In 2014, IAC merged its CollegeHumor with its production company Electus, consolidating its digital studios, production companies, and web entertainment properties. Under Electus Digital, Reich founded CH Media's offshoot production company Big Breakfast, and moved CollegeHumor's video team to Los Angeles. That year, Drawfee was also spun off into its own channel. In December 2014, Fortune's Erin Griffith reported that IAC was considering selling CollegeHumor with the aim of finding a buyer who would "pay around $100 million" for the company. According to Griffith, this was part of a trend of comedy websites and other video outlets seeking to be sold after Disney acquired the Maker Studios YouTube channels for almost $1 billion.

CollegeHumor began to use Facebook as a platform for videos which, in 2017, had a higher reach than YouTube. However, Facebook never delivered the expected revenue which led to a pivot towards developing a subscription service "by mid- to late 2017" to "better monetize its audience". Video production staff were split – the staff for Big Breakfast, which focused on production licensed to third parties, was reduced to six people while the upcoming subscription service had a staff of over 60 people.

On September 26, 2018, CH Media launched Dropout, a subscription service that includes uncensored and original video series, animations, and other forms of media including comics and fictionalized chat conversations.

In October 2018, IAC sold Electus, which included Big Breakfast, to Propagate Content. On January 23, 2019, CH Media announced on the Dorkly homepage that they would be ceasing the publication of new articles and comics on the Dorkly site in favor of shifting to other platforms for new material, citing increased costs of the website and the decline of ad based revenue for publications such as Dorkly.

=== Acquisition by Sam Reich and rebranding to Dropout (2020–present) ===
On January 8, 2020, it was announced that IAC was selling CH Media to its chief creative officer, Sam Reich, resulting in the job loss of nearly all employees and staff. Reich said in 2024 that he had paid nothing for CH Media, as IAC's aggressive approach towards quickly selling the company had resulted in it receiving very few offers. The restructured company was reduced to seven people; Brennan Lee Mulligan, Dungeon Master of the series Dimension 20, was the only creative left on the payroll. Bloomberg News reported that, "IAC will keep a minority stake in the business, according to a person familiar with the matter". Reich clarified that the company would continue releasing pre-recorded CollegeHumor productions on its streaming platform Dropout for at least the next 6 months and stated that he hoped to use that time in order to "save Dropout, CollegeHumor, Drawfee, Dorkly, and many of our shows". Knibbs commented that "Reich is beloved within the CollegeHumor community—WIRED spoke with more than a dozen former employees, and the praise was unanimously effusive, rare for someone who just laid a bunch of people off".

In July 2020, a Dropout.tv newsletter noted that production had begun on new seasons of various Dropout shows. The company continued to upload content on the CollegeHumor YouTube channel. Also that month, it was announced that Drawfee was to be spun off into an independent company, owned by creators who had previously lost their CH Media jobs. In December 2020, Reich commented that:

We saw this opportunity to sort of right size it. 'Okay, if the expensive content isn't moving the needle, maybe that opens up a window for us to do a less expensive version of this.' And it's that pitch that we made around town to try to sell CollegeHumor. And it's only when no one took us up on that offer that I went 'you know what, I think I believe enough in this to try to do it myself.'

In July 2022, PC Magazine commented that the current slate of shows still reflected the January 2020 reduction "to a skeleton team with far fewer resources and full-time staff to create original content. When it comes to new, weekly shows these days, it's basically all Breaking News improv bits and game shows. There's also an incredibly heavy emphasis on the popular tabletop role-playing game show Dimension 20". In May 2023, it was announced that Dorkly was to be spun off into an independent company, owned by Lowbrow. The announcement was made on the various Dorkly social media accounts, including Instagram and Twitter.

On September 26, 2023, it was announced that the branding of CollegeHumor would be retired, in favor of Dropout. This included rebranding the CollegeHumor YouTube channel to the Dropout YouTube channel. Reich stated that, "More people who are active fans think of us as Dropout than CollegeHumor now, and this message is almost for everyone else". On moving away from the CollegeHumor style of shortform sketches, Reich highlighted that was in part due to the transition from advertisement-based video on demand (AVOD) to subscription-based video on demand (SVOD) as they felt they "needed to offer something more meaningful". The SVOD model also allows Dropout to have editorial freedom as AVOD platforms such as YouTube and TikTok have a "censorship issue" – Reich claimed many topics may result in being "marked as not safe for advertisers" so the ideal content for these platforms is "a little milquetoast". In 2023, the company did its first profit sharing with anyone who made at least $1 with the company during the year. In early 2024, Reich said that Dropout had twenty employees, up from fifteen in 2023 and with plans to continue that slow growth to 25 by the end of the year.

== CollegeHumor content ==
CollegeHumor produced original comedy videos under the CH Originals (formerly known as CHTV) banner. In addition, the website hosted a large collection of user-submitted viral videos, encompassing home movies, bizarre sports highlights, sketches, and such. These videos were released one month prior to being posted on the CollegeHumor YouTube channel. The CollegeHumor archive of over 1,500 videos is available on the Dropout streaming platform. In December 2022, the CollegeHumor YouTube channel had over 7.39 billion views and 14.6 million subscribers.

Digiday stated that "CollegeHumor's YouTube channel was at one time YouTube's seventh largest by number of subscribers". Wired highlighted that YouTube became so central to the company that they "abandoned" the CollegeHumor "website in favor of rerouting CollegeHumor.com to its YouTube channel". In 2017, CollegeHumor had "upward of 200 million Facebook video views a month, about twice the number of views then received by CollegeHumor videos on YouTube"; by 2019, the Facebook video monthly views slipped "to about one-third of the 2017 tally". The Washington Post opined that the pivot to partnering with Facebook "probably sounded the death knell for the humor site" as Facebook had falsely inflated video metrics. In contrast, Wired commented that its sources "suggested YouTube was far more central and influential to CollegeHumor's business model than" Facebook – CollegeHumor ran into trouble creating videos which YouTube would allow monetization of as flagged videos would be banned from advertisement placement.

CH Originals, established by Sam Reich in 2006, was CollegeHumor's original comedy video section, featuring sketches and short films written and produced by the CollegeHumor staff, which included Pat Cassels, Emily Axford, Adam Conover, Mike Trapp, and Brian Murphy (among others). CH Originals videos included sketch comedy, film and television parodies, animation, and music videos. In addition to stand-alone viral comedy shorts or "one-offs", which are usually shot on location and feature hired actors, CH Originals also produced a number of series—notably Hardly Working, Jake and Amir, and Nerd Alert—which were shot in the CH office and starred the CH staff members themselves.

=== List of web series ===
This is a list of notable CollegeHumor series and CH Originals. Most of these series are now available in their entirety on the Dropout streaming service.

Name	Description	People involved	Ref.
Adam Ruins Everything	A series that has Adam Conover informing other characters and the audience about common misconceptions. Adam also voices versions of himself in animated segments. This segment later gained a TV spin-off on truTV.	Adam Conover, Chris Parnell	
The All-Nighter	An annual event in which the CH staff shoots and posts 12 videos in one night between 9 pm and 9 am. While doing so, they communicate with fans via Twitter and UStream.	CollegeHumor staff	
Badman	A parody of the Christopher Nolan Batman films. This version of Batman (played by Pete Holmes) is clueless and incompetent, frustrating both allies and villains. Matt McCarthy appears in multiple roles (e.g., Gordon, Two-Face), alongside guest stars like Kumail Nanjiani and Patton Oswalt.	Pete Holmes, Matt McCarthy, Kumail Nanjiani, Patton Oswalt	
BearShark	A cartoon in the vein of Wile E. Coyote and the Road Runner in which a bear and a shark team up to eat a man named Steve in every episode. The series was broadcast via the Nintendo Video application for Nintendo 3DS, with a game based on the series being digitally released via the Nintendo eShop on May 2, 2013.	Kevin Corrigan, Owen Parsons, Caldwell Tanner	
CEO Messages	A series of messages from a variety of CEOs of different companies, all played by Brennan Lee Mulligan.	Brennan Lee Mulligan	
Dinosaur Office	A stop motion animated series of shorts about a group of dinosaurs working in a corporate office. The dinosaurs face typical office problems such as rushing to meet deadlines, as well as less typical issues such as their Tyrannosaurus boss eating the employees. The series was broadcast via the Nintendo Video application for Nintendo 3DS, with its series premiere being one of the first videos released on the service in 2011. There were plans for a video game based on the series that was scrapped.	Emily Axford, Kevin Corrigan, Brian K. Murphy, Sam Reich, Caldwell Tanner	
Full Benefits	Two coworkers attempt to keep their relationship hidden. Each episode usually begins with them waking up in the same bed after having one of their numerous one night stands.		
Furry Force	A cartoon about four teens who become anthropomorphic animals to combat villain Victor Vivisector’s schemes. The show, nominally "on Fox Kids," won the 2014 Ursa Major award for "Best Anthropomorphic Dramatic Short Work or Series."	Brian K. Murphy, Caldwell Tanner, Emily Axford, Adam Conover, Josh Ruben	
Hello, My Name Is...	An improvisational series in which Josh Ruben is placed in prosthetics and make-up by their makeup artist Hannah, and he spontaneously creates a character on the spot, who is then interviewed by Pat Cassells. The show was rebooted in 2023 as the Dropout original Very Important People.	Pat Cassels, Josh Ruben	
Hot Date	Brian K. Murphy and Emily Axford attempt a romantic night out, only to sabotage themselves with their own quirks and insecurities. Later adapted to a television series also called Hot Date.	Brian K. Murphy, Emily Axford	
If Google was a Guy	Brian Huskey personifies Google as various users come into his office to make searches. Cameos include Siri (Alison Becker), WebMD (Roger Anthony), the NSA (Brian Sacca), and Bing (Randall Park). Other guest stars include Colton Dunn, Mark McGrath, Charles Shaughnessy, and Jewel.	Brian Huskey, Alison Becker, Roger Anthony, Brian Sacca, Randall Park	
Jake and Amir	Jake Hurwitz and Amir Blumenfeld play humorous versions of themselves: Jake is usually depicted as a sensible "straight man" and Amir as his annoying, obsessive, and odd co-worker.	Jake and Amir	
Prank War	A series that documents the escalating pranks that are played between former CH staffers Streeter Seidell and Amir Blumenfeld. Prank War gained national notoriety after Amir staged a fake public marriage proposal from Streeter to his girlfriend Sharon at a New York Yankees game. Seidell and Blumenfeld have appeared twice on Jimmy Kimmel Live! to discuss their pranks. They have both since acknowledged the pranks to be pre-planned and fake.	Amir Blumenfeld, Streeter Seidell	
Precious Plum	A series parodying Here Comes Honey Boo Boo, starring Josh Ruben and Elaine Carroll (written by Carroll and Sam Reich). It replaced Very Mary-Kate in CollegeHumor’s Thursday release slot. A sequel, See Plum Run, was later released on Dropout.	Josh Ruben, Elaine Carroll, Sam Reich	
The Six	Each episode features six outrageous scenarios, such as getting out of the friend zone or having "monsters" for roommates.	Josh Ruben	
Troopers	A series parodying sci-fi movies and shows, particularly Star Wars. Most episodes feature stormtrooper-like soldiers; Larry (Josh Ruben) and Rich (Sam Reich) dealing with the day-to-day pitfalls of serving an evil interstellar empire. The show includes Aubrey Plaza in a recurring role as the Princess. A second season was released as a Dropout exclusive.	Josh Ruben, Sam Reich, Aubrey Plaza	
Very Mary-Kate	A series that revolves around the life of a fictionalized Mary-Kate Olsen—a rich young woman who is heir to Woody Allen—and her sensible bodyguard.	Elaine Carroll	
WTF 101	A cartoon parody of The Magic School Bus featuring absurdly gross or disturbing lessons in biology, history, etc. Mary Pat Gleason voiced the unhinged teacher, Professor Foxtrot.	Mary Pat Gleason	

=== Other series ===
Previously, CH Originals produced The Michael Showalter Showalter, a Charlie Rose-style comedic interview series hosted by Michael Showalter and featuring guests such as Paul Rudd, Andy Samberg, David Cross, Zach Galifianakis, and Michael Cera. They also gained notoriety for Street Fighter: The Later Years, which was nominated for "Best Series" by YouTube's Video Awards. In 2011, they featured Bad Dads, a series of five, three-minute shorts starring Michael Cera and Will Hines. The series was written, directed, and produced by Derek Westerman.

The Drawfee Show was originally hosted by Caldwell Tanner and Nathan Yaffee. It has since gone independent outside of CollegeHumor/Dropout, and is currently hosted by Julia Lepetit, Jacob Andrews, and Nathan Yaffee. Karina Farek was also a host from 2019 to the summer of 2026.

=== The CollegeHumor Show ===
On December 17, 2008, CollegeHumor.com announced The CollegeHumor Show, a scripted comedy that premiered on MTV on February 8, 2009. The half-hour comedy was written by and starred nine CollegeHumor editorial staff members (Ricky Van Veen, Jake Hurwitz, Amir Blumenfeld, Dan Gurewitch, Pat Cassels, Sarah Schneider, Streeter Seidell, Sam Reich and Jeff Rubin), who played fictionalized versions of themselves.

=== Other CollegeHumor.com content ===
CollegeHumor.com's pictures section featured user-submitted photographs. Like the site's videos, CollegeHumor's pictures were of a humorous or bizarre nature. CollegeHumor also occasionally held photo-based contests for its users. In 2011, Kevin Morris of The Daily Dot reported that CollegeHumor had lifted several images from Reddit without permission of the copyright holders and had added the CollegeHumor logo to these images.

CollegeHumor.com posted original writing from its staff and users, including humorous essays, comics, interviews and weekly columns on sports, video games, college life, and dating. Contributing writers to the site have included notable comedians Steve Hofstetter, Christian Finnegan, Brooks Wheelan, Paul Scheer, Amir Blumenfeld, and Judah Friedlander. Andrew Bridgman curated the articles and edited the website's front page.

== Dropout series ==
In 2018, CollegeHumor created the subscription-based streaming platform Dropout, which became the home for a number of new scripted and unscripted series. After the company was sold to Sam Reich in 2020, budget constraints led to the cancellation of all scripted series in favor of more budget-friendly unscripted series.

=== Um, Actually ===
A game show — hosted by Mike Trapp and Michael Saltzman (seasons 1–8), later Ify Nwadiwe and Brian David Gilbert (season 9–) — in which contestants win points by correcting untrue statements about pop culture. Contestants must begin their corrections with the phrase "Um, actually...", or risk losing the point. Guests have included Matthew Mercer, Rachel Bloom, Demi Adejuyigbe, Kristian Nairn, Doug Jones, Maddox, Justin McElroy, Travis McElroy, Alice Wetterlund, Lindsay Jones, Zach Sherwin, Thomas Middleditch, and "Weird Al" Yankovic.

=== Breaking News: No Laugh Newsroom ===
A comedy series in which four performers act out a newscast and read absurd or comedic text from a teleprompter, with points deducted each time they laugh or smile.

=== Dimension 20 ===
A live play tabletop role-playing show that debuted in 2018. It primarily uses Dungeons & Dragons 5th edition rules, and usually features Brennan Lee Mulligan as the Dungeon Master.

=== Game Changer ===
A game show hosted by Sam Reich in which each episode is a different game and contestants are not told what they are playing before the show. In order to win the game, they must figure out the rules as they play. Special guest appearances have included Jewel, Michael Winslow, Ty Mitchell, Bob the Drag Queen, Tony Hawk, Giancarlo Esposito, and Eric Wareheim. Three spinoffs, Dirty Laundry, Make Some Noise, and Play It by Ear, were released in 2022. A fourth spinoff, Crowd Control, premiered in September, 2025.

== Books ==
- The Writers of CollegeHumor.com (April 6, 2006). The CollegeHumor Guide to College: Selling Kidneys for Beer Money, Sleeping with Your Professors, Majoring in Communications, and Other Really Good Ideas. Dutton Adult. ISBN 0-525-94939-9.
- The Writers of CollegeHumor.com (March 27, 2007). Faking It: How to Seem like a Better Person without Actually Improving Yourself. Dutton Adult. ISBN 978-0-525-94991-6.
- The Writers of CollegeHumor.com (August 15, 2011). CollegeHumor. The Website. The Book. Da Capo Press. ISBN 978-0-306-82026-7.

== Alumni ==
Many members of the writing and acting staff of CollegeHumor have gone on to larger productions after their time with the website. Katie Shepherd of The Washington Post highlighted that "alumni of the humor site have spread throughout the entertainment industry. [...] Multiple CollegeHumor staffers have gone on to write for 'SNL.' Others have gone on to work for critically acclaimed shows".

- Emily Axford and Brian K. Murphy went on to create the Pop television series Hot Date in addition to working on Adam Ruins Everything. They continue to be active members of Dropout, primarily with Dimension 20.
- Amir Blumenfeld and Jake Hurwitz founded the HeadGum podcast network in 2015, which now comprises over 40 different podcasts, including Not Another D&D Podcast starring Emily Axford, Jake Hurwitz, Brian K. Murphy, and Caldwell Tanner.
- Pat Cassels became a staff writer on Full Frontal with Samantha Bee.
- Adam Conover went on to create the truTV show Adam Ruins Everything, based on the CollegeHumor series of the same name, as well as creating The G Word with producer Barack Obama. Conover also went on to serve on the board for the Writers Guild of America West, sitting on the negotiating committee during the 2023 Writers Guild of America strike. He continues to be semi-active in Dropout programs, in particular with Dropout releasing his Stand Up special “Unmedicated”.
- Dan Gurewitch became a staff writer on Last Week Tonight with John Oliver.
- Ben Joseph, a writer for CollegeHumor and Dorkly, went on to write for several animated series, including The Simpsons and Wander Over Yonder, as well as the short-lived live-action series Me, Myself & I.
- Owen Parsons, a writer for CollegeHumor and Dorkly, went on to write for The Daily Show as well as The Opposition with Jordan Klepper, before becoming a staff writer on Last Week Tonight with John Oliver.
- Josh Ruben went on to direct the comedy horror films Scare Me (2020) and Werewolves Within (2021) as well as Netflix's Death to 2021 and other projects. He continues to be an active member of Dropout.
- Sarah Schneider became a staff writer on Saturday Night Live in 2010, before serving as head writer for the series' 42nd season from 2016 to 2017. She went on to co-create the Comedy Central show The Other Two with writer Chris Kelly.
- Siobhan Thompson went on to write for the Adult Swim animated sci-fi comedy series Rick and Morty. She continues to be an active member of Dropout.
- Mike Trapp became a writer for the animated series Rock Paper Scissors and Big City Greens. He continues to be an active member of Dropout.
- Streeter Seidell joined the writing staff at Saturday Night Live and was a writer on the short-lived ABC show Trophy Wife.
- Will Stephen joined the writing staff for Saturday Night Live in 2015.
- Caldwell Tanner went on to storyboard for the Disney Channel animated comedy series Big City Greens.
- Kelly Marie Tran gained global prominence for her role as Rose Tico in the Star Wars sequel trilogy films The Last Jedi (2017) and The Rise of Skywalker (2019). She also voiced the Disney Princess Raya in the animated film Raya and the Last Dragon (2021).
- Lou Wilson went on to become a writer as well as the announcer for Jimmy Kimmel Live!, replacing Dicky Barrett. He also portrayed Richie in The King of Staten Island (2020). He continues to be an active member of Dropout.
- Luke Kelly-Clyne went on to become a film and TV producer, and Head of Studio at Kevin Hart's Hartbeat.
- David Young went on to write for The Tonight Show Starring Jimmy Fallon and Carpool Karaoke: The Series.
- Filmmaker Jim Cummings served as a producer of branded comedy prior to writing/directing Thunder Road and appearing in Halloween Kills and Barry.
