= Dan Gurewitch =

American comedian, writer, and actor (born 1984)

- Born: Daniel Gurewitch; May 20, 1984 (age 42); Suffern, New York, U.S.
- Education: Syracuse University
- Occupations: Comedian, writer, actor
- Years active: 2006–present
- Known for: CollegeHumor (2006–2013); The CollegeHumor Show (2009); Last Week Tonight with John Oliver

Daniel Gurewitch (/ˈɡɜːrwɪtʃ/ GUR-witch; born May 20, 1984) is an American comedian, writer, and actor. He has worked as a senior writer for American comedy website CollegeHumor, and as a writer for the late-night talk and news satire show Last Week Tonight with John Oliver.

== Career ==
A former pupil of Suffern High School, Gurewitch graduated from Syracuse University's S.I. Newhouse School of Public Communications with a degree in television, radio, and film.

From 2006 to 2013, Gurewitch worked as a senior writer for the comedy website CollegeHumor. His work there included Hardly Working and CollegeHumor Originals, as well as the MTV comedy series The CollegeHumor Show, in all of which he was a principal cast member.

He studied improvisation at the Upright Citizens Brigade Theatre under Anthony King, Chris Gethard, Jason Mantzoukas, and Jackie Clarke, among others.

As part of the writing staff for HBO's Last Week Tonight with John Oliver, he has won five Emmy Awards for "Outstanding Writing for a Variety Series,” and five Writers Guild of America Awards.

== Personal life ==
Dan is the cousin of writer and humorist Nicholas Gurewitch, author of newspaper comic strip The Perry Bible Fellowship.
