= Ricky Van Veen =

American entrepreneur (born 1980)

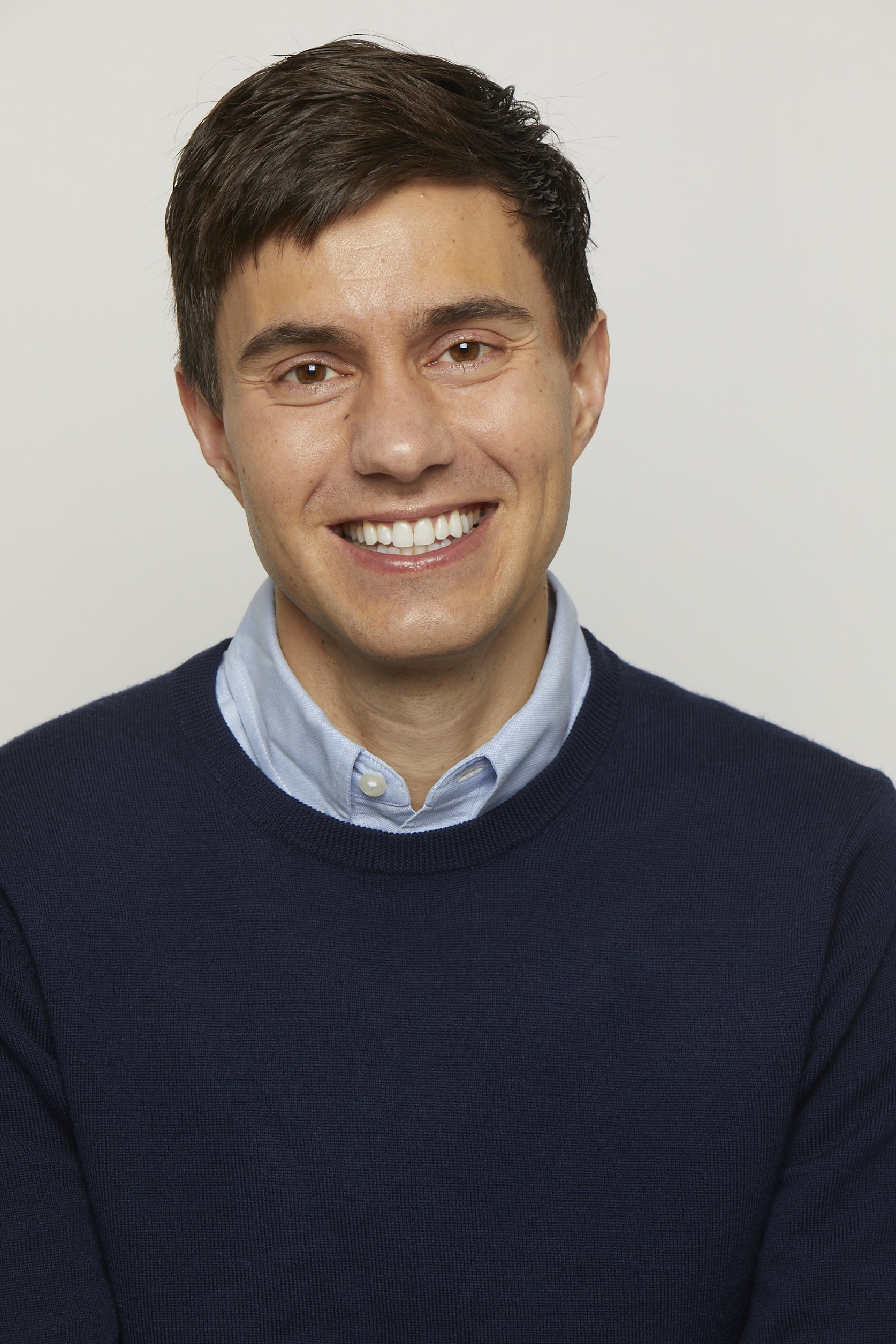
- Van Veen in 2018
- Born: Richard Raphael Van Veen; December 14, 1980 (age 45); Lutherville-Timonium, Maryland, U.S.
- Education: Wake Forest University (BS)
- Occupations: Head of Global Creative Strategy at Meta, Co-founder of CollegeHumor
- Years active: 1999–present
- Spouses: Allison Williams (m. 2015; div. 2019) Caroline Kassie (m. 2021)

Richard Raphael Van Veen (born December 14, 1980) is an American entrepreneur and the Head of Global Creative Strategy at Meta.

Van Veen co-founded Connected Ventures, the early tech startup that launched the comedy brand CollegeHumor and the video sharing website Vimeo. He was also CEO of Notional, the television production company behind the popular series Chopped.

== Early life and education ==
Born in Lutherville-Timonium, Maryland, Van Veen is the son of Helen and Richard Van Veen. He graduated from Wake Forest University with a degree in management and information systems in 2003.

== Career ==
Van Veen created CollegeHumor as a student at Wake Forest University. Van Veen's site was earning between $10 and $15 million a year before the partners sold a controlling stake to IAC/InterActiveCorp. He is also one of the principal owners and founders of Connected Ventures, a company formed around CollegeHumor that included Vimeo and BustedTees.

In July 2009, Van Veen was announced as the CEO of the television production company, Notional.

Van Veen also co-founded the product company Scroll Commerce in 2015, where he invented products designed to sell online. The company was later acquired by BuzzFeed as the foundation of its new Product Labs division.

== Personal life ==
Van Veen married actress Allison Williams in September 2015. On June 27, 2019, Van Veen and Williams issued a joint statement announcing their divorce.

On July 11, 2021, Van Veen married Caroline Kassie.
