= TeePublic =

American apparel and e-commerce company

- Website type: E-commerce
- Founded: 2013
- Headquarters: New York, New York
- Founders: Josh Abramson, Adam Schwartz
- Revenue: A$176.8 million (FY23)
- Parent: Articore (ASX: ATG)
- Website: teepublic.com

TeePublic is a platform for custom apparel and designs owned by Articore. The company was founded by Adam Schwartz and Josh Abramson, who had previously co-founded Vimeo and CollegeHumor.

== History ==
In 2011, Abramson bought back BustedTees, an online T-shirt company he had previously sold to IAC. He and Schwartz launched TeePublic in 2013 as an e-commerce crowdsourcing site where artists could upload and sell their designs. The original business model required at least thirty people to commit to buying a shirt before a design went into production, but today, designs are immediately manufactured and sold. The company has also expanded into other products such as smartphone cases, notebooks, mugs, and canvas prints.

In 2016, TeePublic shipped more than one million products.

In August 2016, the company took down a controversial T-shirt mocking the USC football team. The shirt said "Our OJ only killed Clemson", in reference to O. J. Simpson, who played football at USC and was famously tried and acquitted for murder, and Alabama senior tight end O. J. Howard.

In October 2018, Australia-based Articore acquired TeePublic for US$41 million.

== See also ==
- Cafe Press
- Custom Ink
- Etsy
- Redbubble
- RushOrderTees
- Shopify
- Shutterfly
- Spreadshirt
- Teespring
- Vistaprint
- Zazzle
