= Custom Ink =

American online retail company

- Company type: Private
- Website type: Online custom apparel and accessories, eCommerce
- Available in: English
- Founded: 2000; 26 years ago, in McLean, Virginia
- Headquarters: Fairfax, Virginia
- No. of locations: 11 (October 2026)
- Area served: United States, Canada, Worldwide
- Founders: Marc Katz; Dave Christensen; Mike Driscoll
- CEO: David Doctorow
- Industry: Customized apparel and cccessories
- Products: T-shirts, apparel, accessories
- Services: Custom apparel, swag, promotional products, fundraising campaigns, uniforms, and corporate gifts
- Revenue: ~US$500 million
- Employees: 800+
- Website: customink.com

Custom Ink is an American online retail company headquartered in Fairfax, Virginia, that makes custom clothing and other items such as t-shirts, sweatshirts, bags, and tech accessories.

== History ==
Custom Ink (first launched as CustomInk) was founded in 2000 by Marc Katz, the company's CEO and Chairman, and several of his college friends. It began as a t-shirt design company with funding from family and friends, and consisted of a ten person team. BT Wolfenshohn was the company's first lead investor. Custom Ink reported $1 million in sales its first year and $3 million in 2002. The company's first profit was reported in 2003 with gross revenue of $7 million.

In 2005, Inc. magazine ranked Custom Ink the 55th fastest growing business in the U.S. The company reported $61 million in sales in 2009.

In 2011, Custom Ink opened its first production facility in Charlottesville, Virginia. At the time, the company had expanded to include customized specialty items such as golf balls and umbrellas. It would continue to expand, offering more customized clothing and items including sweats and hats.

In November 2013, Custom Ink received $40 million from Revolution Growth, the investment fund run by Steve Case, Ted Leonsis, and Donn Davis. The investment reportedly helped the growth of two new projects: Booster and Pear. Booster (later Custom Ink Fundraising) is a crowd-funding website where organizers design and sell T-shirts to raise money for different social causes.

In 2016, the company had nine locations and around 1,670 employees. The company’s name changed to the current form of Custom Ink in 2017.

By 2020, Custom Ink provided customization services for more than 1,000 types of apparel and accessories.

During the 2020 coronavirus pandemic, the company saw sales drop 80% in only a few days as people stopped planning reunions or in-person gatherings of any kind. The company was forced to furlough around 75% of staff, but continued paying health insurance premiums for all, helped employees apply for unemployment benefits, and offered other support services. Due to the N95 mask shortages, the company switched gears to sell cloth masks, they also sold work-from-home kits to help remote employees remain connected and drive-by graduation gear for schools. Sales from these ideas and a return to normal business as the pandemic began to recede led the company to bring back its employees by August 2020.

On January 3, 2023, Custom Ink laid off 206 workers in Charlottesville, Virginia, and another 132 in Reno, Nevada. Some workers were able to move to open positions at Custom Ink's Dallas facility; those who didn’t received separation packages that included three months of health benefits, job placement assistance, and between 10–20 weeks of pay dependent on tenure.

In December 2023, the company launched a new "end-to-end" swag management platform called Swag Space. Swag Space provides an eCommerce platform, automated design support, order production, order tracking, warehousing and distribution, and Shopify integration. It is designed for distributors and is an effort to "bridge the gap" between the traditional supplier-distributor model and direct-to-consumer platforms. Swag Space was built upon the infrastructure and technology of their acquisition of Swag.com.

For several years Custom Ink held the Be Good to Each Other Campaign, this campaign raised money and awareness for the National Bullying Prevention Center. Custom Ink’s work was supported by athletes and celebrities such as Gina Rodriguez and Paul Rabil.

In July 2024, the company announced that in August the former Realtor.com CEO David Doctorow would be the company's new CEO, while Katz would continue as Chairman of the Custom Ink board of directors.

== Acquisitions ==
On February 4, 2016, Custom Ink acquired the Los Angeles company Represent.com, which helps celebrities sell limited-run T-shirts and merchandise to fans and followers. Represent was later acquired by Cameo in 2021.

In 2019, Custom Ink purchased Sidestep, a website and mobile app that strictly sells concert merchandise. The acquisition was done through Custom Ink's at-the-time subsidiary Represent.

In November 2021, the company purchased New York City-based Swag.com for an undisclosed amount. Swag.com is an online design and ordering company for corporate swag and gifting.

Two months later, in January 2022, the company acquired Printfection, a swag management platform. Printfection's clients include Salesforce, HubSpot, and Zendesk.

== Locations ==
By October 2026, Custom Ink had 11 showroom locations across 7 states. These locations offer in person design services and the ability to sample garments before placing an order.

== Awards ==
In 2014, Fortune and Great Place to Work ranked Custom Ink as one of their Top 100 places to work.

== See also ==
- RushOrderTees
- Redbubble
- Shutterfly
- Spreadshirt
- TeePublic
- Teespring
- Vistaprint
- Zazzle
