= Shutterfly =

American photography, photography products, and image sharing company

Shutterfly, LLC.
- Company type: Private
- Founded: 1999; 27 years ago
- Headquarters: Redwood City, California
- Owners: Apollo Global Management (majority); District Photo (minority)
- Key people: Sally Pofcher (president and CEO); Dwayne Black (senior VP & COO)
- Industry: Photograph-derived manufacture; photo sharing
- Revenue: ▲US$2 billion (2018)
- Operating income: ▲US$115.54 million (2018)
- Net income: ▲US$50.37 million (2018)
- Total assets: ▲US$2.302 billion (2018)
- Total equity: ▼US$674.37 million (2018)
- Employees: 7,094 (2018)
- Subsidiaries: Snapfish; Lifetouch; BorrowLenses
- Website: www.shutterflyinc.com

Shutterfly, LLC. is an American photography, photography products, and image sharing company, headquartered in San Jose, California. The company is mainly known for custom photo printing services, including books featuring user-provided images, framed pictures, and other objects with custom image prints, including blankets or mobile phone cases. The company has a variety of sub-brands including the main Shutterfly photo gift business, TinyPrints, SnapFish, Spoonflower, Shutterfly Business Solutions, and Lifetouch.

Founded in 1999 by Dan Baum and Eva Manolis, the company is currently led by Sally Pofcher as the president and CEO, and owned by Apollo Global Management. The company went public in 2006, but returned to private ownership in 2019 after being acquired by Apollo. On March 29, 2023, Shutterfly deleted all photographs of customers who did not purchase their products more than once every 18 months. After feedback from customers, the deleted photos were temporarily restored on May 1, 2023.

== History ==
Shutterfly was founded in December 1999 by Eva Manolis and Dan Baum as an internet-based social expression and personal publishing service. Its corporate headquarters are located in San Jose, California, with offices in other locations, including Eden Prairie, Minnesota and Haifa, Israel. The company's flagship products are photo books and customized cards and stationery.

In 2000, Shutterfly partnered with Kodak to offer their customers film developing and scanning services.

In 2001, Shutterfly secured $3 million in incremental capital from Silicon Valley Bank and $10 million from Clark and Mohr Davidow Ventures. The funds include an equipment financing line from Silicon Valley bank. In 2002, the company exceeded its expected earnings and began considering an IPO for 2004 however, it did not take place until 2006. In September 2006, they completed their initial public offering and their common stock was officially listed on the NASDAQ Global Select Market under the symbol “SFLY."

In 2007 Shutterfly was recognized by Deloitte & Touche as Fast 50 Technology Company for Silicon Valley and a Fast 500 Company for North America. Shutterfly ranked #20 in the Internet, Media & Entertainment and Communication category on the Fast 50 list and ranked #241 on the Fast 500 list.

On June 10, 2019, Apollo Global Management announced that it would acquire Shutterfly for $2.7 billion, as well as its competitor Snapfish in a separate transaction valued at around $300 million. Apollo plans to merge both companies into a single entity, with Snapfish parent company District Photo as a minority stakeholder. On September 25, 2019, Apollo's acquisition of Shutterfly was completed, while the proposed merger of Shutterfly and Snapfish was still in process. The merger of Shutterfly and Snapfish was completed on January 8, 2020.

In September 2021, Shutterfly settled a class-action lawsuit, relating to a breach of Illinois' Biometric Information Privacy Act, for US$6.75 million.

In December 2021, Shutterfly was subject to a ransomware attack. The ransomware group 'Conti' subsequently published 7 gigabytes of Shutterfly data including employment agreements, financial documents, legal documents and payroll data.

Sally Pofcher was named CEO in early May 2023, replacing Hilary Schneider, who transitioned to the board of directors as a strategic advisor.

On March 29, 2023, Shutterfly deleted or removed access to all photographs of customers whose accounts were deemed "inactive."

CFO Mike Eklund resigned in September 2023 and was succeeded by Jan Paul Teuwen, former CFO of Lumileds.

== Acquisitions ==
In 2012, Shutterfly acquired Kodak Gallery from the Eastman Kodak Company for $23.8 million.

In 2009, Shutterfly began its acquisition plans with the purchase of Tiny Pictures, a mobile photo-sharing application centered on photo commenting. This is the first of several acquisitions the company made over the next few years. In 2011, Shutterfly acquired Tiny Prints, Inc. and Wedding Paper Divas. In 2012, the company acquired Penguin Digital, the makers of the MoPho app which they transitioned into the Shutterfly Mobile App. In 2013, the company acquired This Life, a cloud-based solution for organizing and sharing photos and videos. That year, Shutterfly also acquired BorrowLenses, a rental company for high-end photography equipment. In May 2024, BorrowLenses was sold to Lensrentals for an undisclosed amount. The company acquired MyPublisher, a photobook pioneer, in April 2013 and it was shut down in May 2017.

In 2014, Shutterfly acquired mobile app company Groovebook for $14.5 million which had secured a deal on Shark Tank eleven months prior. In 2018, Shutterfly acquired Lifetouch for $825 million.

In June 2021, Shutterfly acquired the on-demand printing company Spoonflower.

== Products and services ==
Shutterfly enables users to create personalized photo gifts (including photos and text) such as smartphone cases, photo books, wall art, and home décor. Through its Lifetouch division, it also provides portraiture services.

=== Divisions ===
==== Tiny Prints and Wedding Divas ====
In March 2011, Shutterfly acquired personalized card and stationery seller Tiny Prints, Inc. and partner-company Wedding Paper Divas for $141 million in cash and 3.9 million shares. The total transaction was valued at $333 million. In September 2014, the company launched “Tiny Prints for iPad” in September 2014; a mobile version of their online stationery shop the company acquired in 2011.

==== This Life ====
In 2013, Shutterfly acquired ThisLife, for organizing and sharing photos and videos. ThisLife initially launched in 2010 by husband-and-wife team Matt and Andrea Johnson. ThisLife has raised a $2.75 million seed round led by Madrona Venture Group, with Madrona Managing Director Greg Gottesman joining its board. The company was acquired by Shutterfly in January 2013 and the purchase was reported to cost $25 million. ThisLife aggregates photos from social networks, mobile devices, personal computers, and cloud storage. The company transitioned This Life into the all-new Shutterfly Photos platform in 2016.

==== Treat ====
In April 2012, Shutterfly launched Treat, a service to create customized greeting cards. Unlike other divisions of Shutterfly that were acquired, Treat was developed internally. The site has 4,500 customizable card designs and has a partnership with Hallmark. In February 2015, Shutterfly announced it would shut down Treat.

==== BorrowLenses ====
Mark Gurevich and Max Shevyakov launched BorrowLenses in 2007 as a way for individuals to rent high-level camera equipment. The company has two headquarters in San Carlos, California and Waltham, Massachusetts. In October 2013, Shutterfly acquired BorrowLenses. Terms of the deal weren't released. In 2024, it was sold to Lensrentals.

==== Lifetouch ====
Lifetouch Inc. is an American-based photography company headquartered in Eden Prairie, Minnesota. Its Canadian operations is based in Winnipeg, Manitoba, and the company also has facilities in Nevada, Indiana, and Ohio. Lifetouch was acquired by Shutterfly in 2018 for $825 million.

== See also ==
- Web-to-print
- Print-on-demand
- Lensrentals

=== Self-printing publishers ===
- RushOrderTees
- Cafe Press
- Custom Ink
- Displays2Go
- Redbubble
- Shopify
- Spreadshirt
- Teespring
- Vistaprint
- Zazzle
