= Snapfish =

Web-based photo sharing and printing service

- Type: Subsidiary
- Industry: Photography products, Printing
- Founded: 1999; 27 years ago
- Headquarters: San Jose, California
- Products: Photo sharing, Photo products
- Owner: Snapfish, LLC
- Parent: Shutterfly
- Website: www.snapfish.com

Snapfish is a web-based photo sharing and photo printing service owned by Shutterfly headquartered in San Jose, California. It was launched in 1999 by Rajil Kapoor, Bala Parthasarathy, Suneet Wadhwa, and Shripati Acharya.

== History ==
Snapfish was launched in 1999 by business partners Rajil Kapoor, Bala Parthasarathy, Suneet Wadhwa, and Shripati Acharya. Ben Nelson joined soon thereafter as corporate development operations lead, to become CFO and later president and CEO.

On October 30, 2001, the service was acquired by Beltsville, Maryland-based digital imaging services company District Photo for an undisclosed amount.

In 2004, Snapfish opened a physical retail concept store in Alexandria, Virginia, but later closed it.

The next year, Snapfish was bought by Hewlett-Packard for $300 million while Nelson was CEO, even though the service's revenue at the time was less than $100 million.

Nelson continued to run the company as an HP subsidiary. During this time, Snapfish partnered with Walgreens, Costco, and Walmart.

In August 2013, Snapfish announced on their local websites (and through a mailing to members) that they were shutting down the service in Belgium, India, the Netherlands and Spain. In April 2015, HP reached an agreement to sell Snapfish back to District Photo. Under the terms of the sale, HP allowed the company to continue to use its printing services.

During a website conversion in 2016, the service experienced a data loss. Photos prior to January 2014 were unable to be migrated to the new website system. Snapfish said that although some photo albums were recovered, others would remain empty. Typically Snapfish had three versions of images: high resolution, low resolution, and printable images. Both the high and low resolution images were lost and the backup files for the printable images were not recoverable.

Jasbir Patel was named president and CEO in January 2017. On September 28, 2018, it was announced that Snapfish would acquire CafePress for more than $25 million. The acquisition was completed on November 9, 2018.

On June 10, 2019, Apollo Global Management announced that it would acquire both Snapfish and its rival Shutterfly in separate deals valued at around $3 billion in total. The two companies would be merged into a single entity, with Snapfish parent company District Photo as a minority stakeholder. The merger of Shutterfly and Snapfish was completed on January 8, 2020.

On May 4, 2020, it was announced that Snapfish will no longer be providing the platform for Boots Photo in the UK and Ireland from May 13, 2020. On September 1, 2020, it was announced that PlanetArt, a subsidiary of a French diversified global technology group, had acquired CafePress from Snapfish/Shutterfly.

== See also ==
- Snapfish Lab, a service of HP Labs
