= Avant (company) =

Company

- Type: Private
- Industry: Consumer finance; Financial services; Financial technology
- Founded: 2012
- Founder: Al Goldstein; John Sun; Paul Zhang
- Headquarters: Chicago, Illinois, U.S.
- Area served: U.S., U.K.
- Key people: Matt Bochenek (CEO)
- Products: Lines of credit; Personal loans
- Revenue: ▼US$316.7 million (2017)
- Net income: ▲US$−15.7 million (2017)
- Number of employees: 550 (2018)
- Website: avant.com

Avant, LLC, formerly AvantCredit, is a private Chicago, Illinois-based company in the financial technology industry. The company was established in 2012 by serial entrepreneur Albert "Al" Goldstein, John Sun, and Paul Zhang. Initially structured as a mid-prime lender, the company issued its first personal unsecured loan in early 2013 using its proprietary technology to determine an individual's creditworthiness.

Avant's technology applies algorithms, machine-learning protocols, and analytical tools in addition to the standard consumer data pulled to determine a customized rate, amount and length at which money can be borrowed. The company began providing access to loans in just 16 states in 2013. Avant currently issues loans in 46 states, and in October 2013, the company expanded beyond US borders to Canada and the United Kingdom.

From 2012 to 2015 the company saw substantial growth with over $1 billion in loans originated through Avant's website and $1.4 billion in contributions by investors, including August Capital, Tiger Global and Victory Park Capital.

== Overview ==
Upon entering the growing financial technology FinTech industry, Avant developed proprietary software that attempts to efficiently mitigate default risk and fraud by using machine-learning technology. The company has worked towards a fully online experience where customers can apply on Avant's website. This eliminates the need for physical branches, but also is able to simplify the borrowing process, with the bulk of its employment verification and funding done over the internet. In April 2015, Avant launched the Avant Institutional Marketplace with global alternative asset manager Kohlberg Kravis Roberts, Victory Park Capital, and Jefferies as lead investors. The $400 million forward-flow financing arrangement enables institutional investors to purchase loans originated through the Avant technology platform and benefits Avant by diversifying funding sources.

== Company establishment ==
After graduating from the Y Combinator startup program in 2012, Sun and Zhang looked to build their business, Debteye, a platform designed to help individuals manage their debt by making informed decisions based on their unique financial situation. With no income, Sun sought a personal loan at a traditional brick-and-mortar establishment. Sun found the process of applying for and obtaining a loan frustrating and time-consuming. This, along with Sun and Zhang's Y Combinator venture, became the inspiration for what became Avant. As former interns of Goldstein's at Enova, Sun and Zhang saw an opportunity to partner with the Chicago entrepreneur in December 2012 and built a product that made borrowing a more streamlined process. The startup set up its headquarters in Chicago where it raised an initial $1 million in seed funding. As of April 2015, Avant has raised over $1 billion in funding and has grown from its original three founders to over 650 employees.

== Acquisition of ReadyForZero ==
In February 2015, AvantCredit acquired the debt management app and platform, ReadyForZero and re-branded itself to Avant. The acquisition was designed to further Avant's mission of "lowering the costs and barriers of borrowing." Another result of the acquisition was the opening of a second office location in Los Angeles, where Ready for Zero had initially been established by its founders, Rod Ebrahimi and Ignacio Thayer, who like Sun and Zhang were also Y-Combinator graduates.

Effective November 12, 2016, Avant will shut down ReadyForZero's credit score and debt planner tools. All user accounts will be deactivated and users will no longer be able to log in. As of this date the company has not commented on the reason for shutting down the ReadyForZero platform.

== Recognition ==
In 2015, Avant was named #6 to Forbes America's Most Promising Companies list as well as Forbes list of Next Billion Dollar Startups. Chief Technology Officer Paul Zhang was listed as one of Inc. Magazine's 30 Under 30 and chief executive officer Al Goldstein won the EY Entrepreneur of the Year Midwest award. Avant has won numerous awards, including the Moxie Award for Breakthrough Digital Company of the Year, Company of the Year – Financial Services at the American Business Awards and one of the Top Global Private Companies by AlwaysOn Global. In 2014 Avant raised $225 million in equity between Tiger Global Management, PayPal co-founder Peter Thiel, and the private equity firm KKR.

== Controversies ==
On 15 April 2019, Avant agreed to pay $3.85 million to settle charges of the Federal Trade Commission. According to the FTC's lawsuit, the company engaged in deceptive loan servicing practices and violated the Telemarketing Sales Rule and the Electronic Fund Transfer Act.

== Spinoff ==
In February 2020, Avant announced the completion of the spinoff of its SaaS financial technology business unit as a new company called Amount.

== See also ==
- SoFi
- Lending Club
- OneMain Financial
- LendingPoint
- LendUp
