= RushOrderTees =

American technology and apparel company

- Company type: Private
- Industry: Technology, embroidery, screen printing, custom apparel
- Founded: 2002
- Headquarters: Philadelphia, Pennsylvania, U.S.
- Key people: Michael Nemeroff (CEO)
- Revenue: $22.9 million USD
- Number of employees: 250
- Parent: Printfly Corporation
- Website: www.rushordertees.com

RushOrderTees is an American technology and custom apparel company based in Philadelphia, Pennsylvania.

== History ==
RushOrderTees was founded in 2002 in Philadelphia by brothers Michael, Jordan and Alexis Nemeroff. They started the company with one machine and one heater in their parents' garage, while attending Lower Moreland High School.

In April 2018, RushOrderTees acquired the design firm Tonic Design based in Callowhill, Philadelphia.

== Activities ==
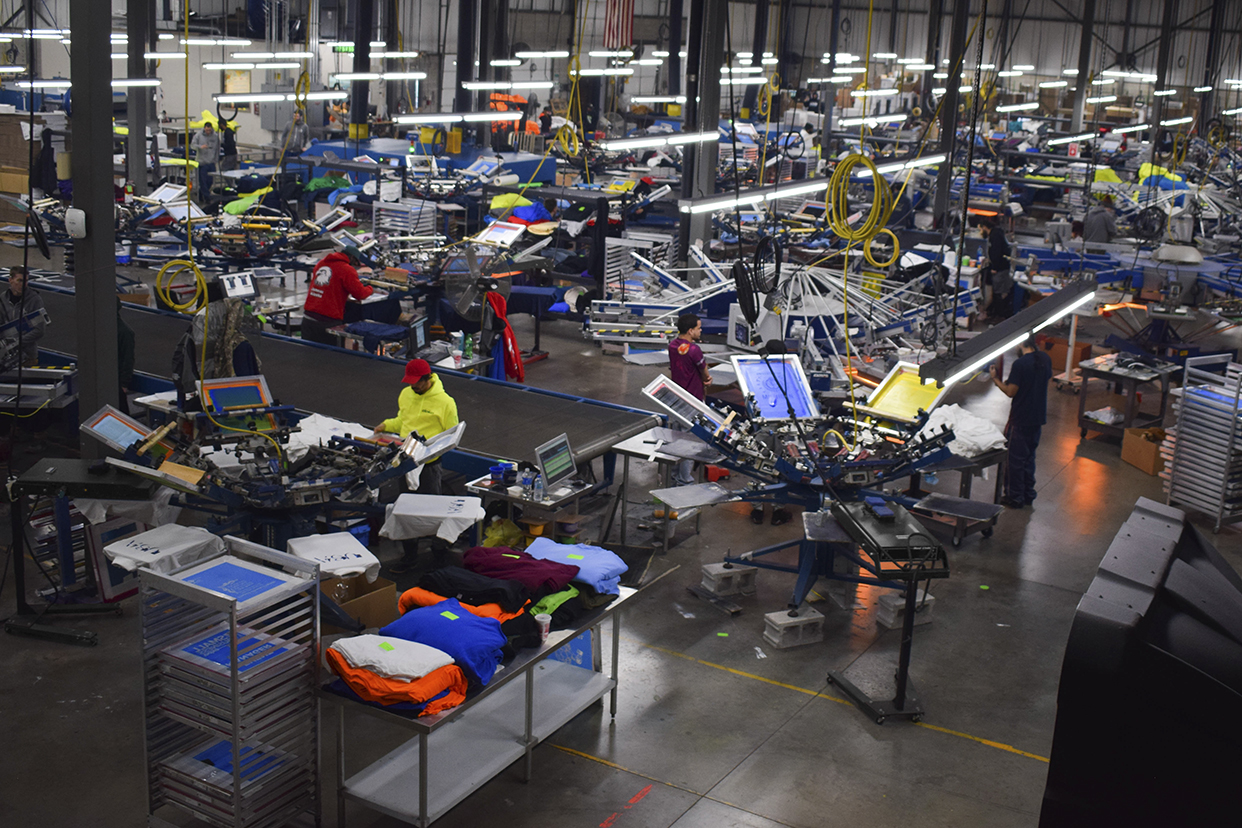
RushOrderTees' custom t-shirt design and printing facility in Philadelphia, Pennsylvania

RushOrderTees currently occupies a 63,000-square-foot (5,900 m^{2}) t-shirt printing and embroidery facility in Philadelphia. The company has a revenue of US$22.9 million as of 2015. It serves as an official apparel provider for the Philadelphia 76ers with which it has entered a partnership. This partnership has included the distribution of Philadelphia 76ers and Philadelphia Eagles t-shirts for the Super Bowl LII.

== See also ==
- Cafe Press
- Custom Ink
- Redbubble
- Shopify
- Shutterfly
- Spreadshirt
- TeePublic
- Teespring
- Vistaprint
- Zazzle
