= Zazzle =

Marketplace In The U.S

Zazzle Inc.
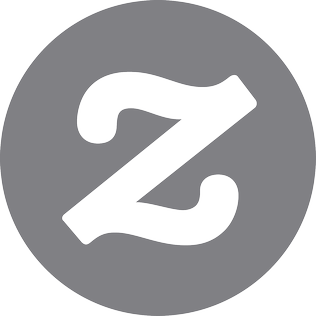
- Type: Private
- Industry: Internet, online retailing
- Founded: 2005; 21 years ago
- Founders: Robert Beaver; Bobby Beaver; Jeff Beaver
- Headquarters: Redwood City, California, United States
- Area served: Worldwide
- Key people: Robert Beaver (CEO)
- Website: zazzle.com

Zazzle
- Website type: E-commerce
- Available in: English, French, German, Spanish, Japanese, Brazilian Portuguese, Portuguese, Swedish, Korean, Canadian French, Dutch
- Owner: Zazzle Inc.
- Website: zazzle.com
- Launched: 2005
- Written in: C#/ASP.NET

Zazzle is an American online marketplace that allows designers and customers to create their own products with independent manufacturers (clothing, posters, etc.), as well as use images from participating companies. Zazzle has partnered with many brands to amass a collection of digital images from companies like Disney and Warner Brothers, as well as NCAA sports teams.

== History ==
Zazzle was launched in 2005. It is based in Redwood City, California. The company received an initial investment of US$16 million in July 2005 from Google investors John Doerr and Ram Shriram, and an additional investment of US$30 million in October 2007.

The site was recognized by TechCrunch as 2007's "best business model" in its first annual Crunchies awards,

Zazzle.com offers digital printing, and embroidered decoration on their retail apparel items, as well as other personalization techniques and items.

In 2022, Zazzle engaged Citigroup Inc. and Barclays Plc to facilitate preparations for a potential initial public offering (IPO) this year.

== Custom postage stamp printing ==
Starting in 2005, Zazzle offered custom postage stamp printing in a partnership with the United States Post Office (USPS). However, on May 15, 2018, Zazzle stopped the custom stamp printing due to new regulations by the USPS.

== Controversy ==
=== Pi trademark incident ===
In May 2014, Zazzle removed thousands of products containing the Greek letter pi (π) from being offered for sale on its website. This was done in response to a cease-and-desist letter sent on behalf of Brooklyn-based artist Paul Ingrisano, who holds the trademark (U.S. Reg. No. 4473631) for the symbol 'π.' (pi followed by a period). Zazzle's content management team initially defended its ban on Zazzle's user forums, despite complaints from Zazzle sellers that Ingrisano's specific trademark did not appear to apply to their designs. Following the backlash from users, however, Zazzle reversed course on May 30 and began restoring products featuring the letter pi that had been initially removed.

=== Font lawsuit ===
In August 2022, graphic designer Nicky Laatz sued Zazzle, saying that the company had secretly purchased a one-user license for her trademarked and copyright-protected fonts and then made them available to all of its hundreds of thousands of designers and tens of millions of users, resulting in hundreds of millions of dollars of profits for Zazzle from products that incorporated her fonts. The lawsuit claims that Zazzle had recommended her font as their second most popular font, and that five of Zazzle's twelve most-popular business cards, as well as several of its most-popular wedding invitations used her fonts.

Zazzle responded by stating that Zazzle had asked to purchase a server license from Laatz, but that Laatz never responded. Zazzle responded in court by asking for the lawsuit to be dismissed based on the fact that fonts cannot be copyrighted in the US. Software to create fonts can be copyrighted, and Laatz said that she hand-coded designs in the font-creation software, but Zazzle's lawyers contend that she deceived the copyright office about this and created the font with a font program.

== See also ==
- RushOrderTees
- Redbubble
- Spreadshirt
- Teespring
- Vistaprint
