= Lensrentals =

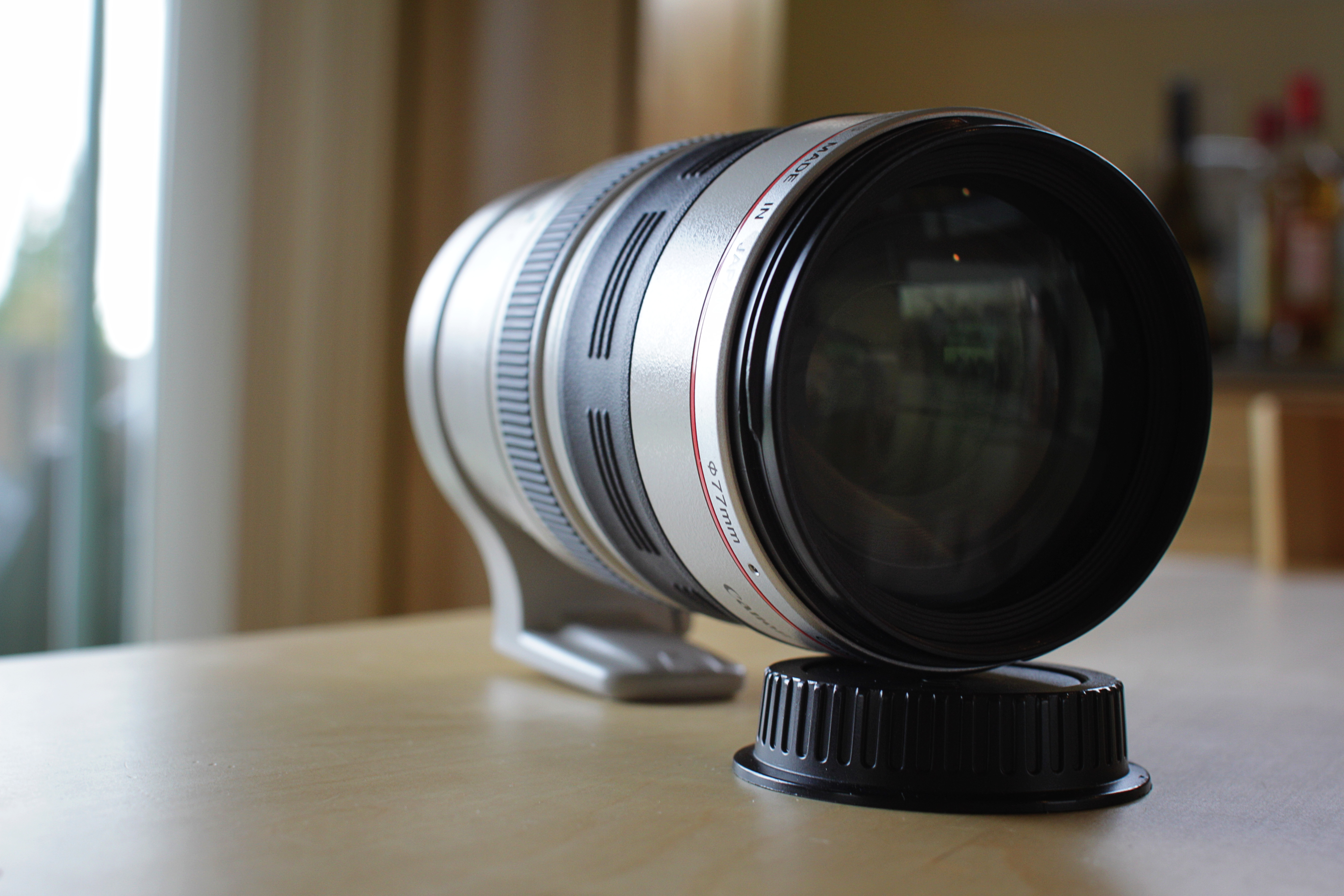
A Canon EF 100-400mm lens rented from the company

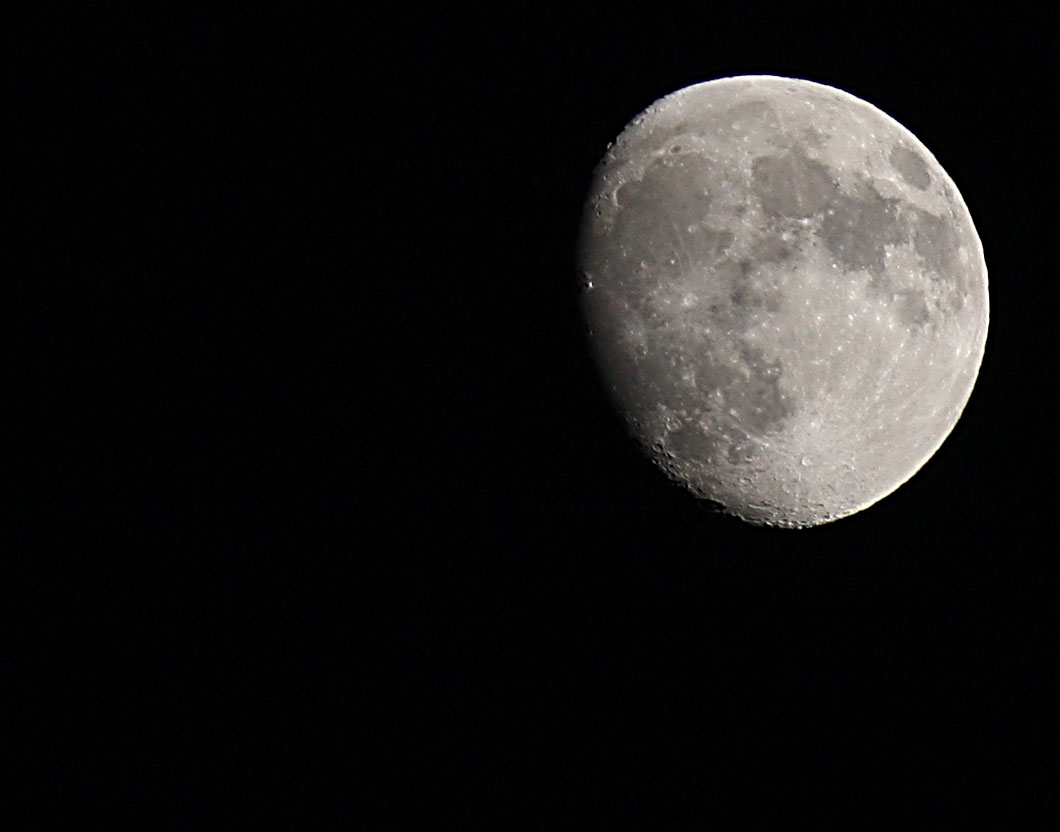
A photo of the moon taken with a lens rented from the company

A test star image used to calibrate lenses

Lensrentals is the largest camera and lens rental company in the United States. It is based in Memphis, Tennessee, and is owned by The Dude Abides, Inc.

Lensrentals ships orders in the United States, and equipment can be returned at locations in Memphis, Tennessee, and Concord, Massachusetts.

Every year, the company publishes annual reports of their highest-rented gear (such as lens brands or lens mounts) from that year.

== History ==
The company was founded by Roger Cicala, a former medical doctor in 2006 after he bought a 500mm lens and then started a website to lease it out. In 2015, Lensrentals Canada shut down. In 2017, the company merged with competitor LensProToGo.

Also during the Solar eclipse of August 21, 2017 Lensrentals reported that many of its customers returned cameras and lenses with extensive damage due to solar energy damaging camera sensors and lenses.

In 2024, Lensrentals acquired competitor Borrowlenses from Shutterfly, and closed its California location.
