= Spoonflower =

Digital printing company

- Founded: May 2008; 17 years ago
- Founders: Stephen Fraser; Gart Davis
- Headquarters: Durham, United States
- Key people: George Goeth-Chi Chao (General Manager)
- Parent: Shutterfly
- Website: www.spoonflower.com

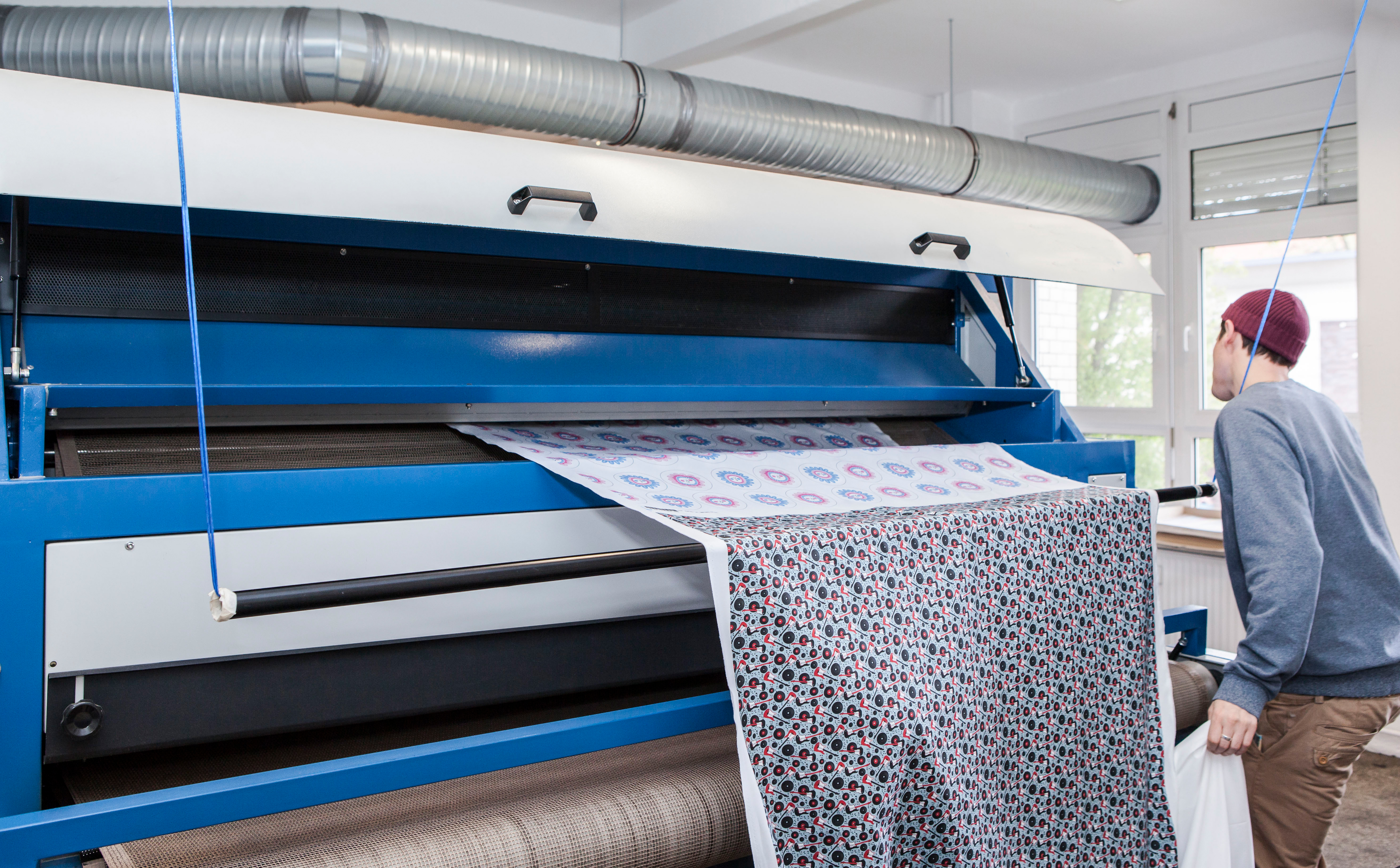
Printing method at Spoonflower

Spoonflower is an on-demand, digital printing company that prints custom fabric, wallpaper, and home decor.

The company was founded in May 2008 by Stephen Fraser and Gart Davis, both formerly of Lulu.com. Spoonflower was acquired by Shutterfly in 2021. In January 2020, Michael Jones, formerly of ChannelAdvisor and eBay, became CEO. Jones was replaced by George Goeth-Chi Chao as vice president and general manager of Spoonflower in November 2023.

Spoonflower was headquartered in Mebane, North Carolina, USA until 2010. Its current headquarters are in Durham, North Carolina, USA, however all manufacturing in Durham concluded in 2023 following Shutterfly's closure of the Durham plant. Spoonflower maintained a European production facility in Neukölln, Berlin, Germany from 2016 until its closure in 2022. The largest investor in the company is Guidepost Growth Equity of Boston. Other investors include Allison Polish, the former company president.

In August 2012, the Spoonflower community numbered over 600,000 individuals who use their own fabric to make curtains, quilts, clothes, bags, furniture, dolls, pillows, framed artwork, costumes, banners and much, much more. The Spoonflower Marketplace currently offers the largest collection of independent fabric designers in the world.

Spoonflower's digital textile printers are large-format inkjet printers specially modified to run fabric.

As of August 2023, all Spoonflower fabric and wallpaper is printed in Shutterfly facilities in Fort Mill, South Carolina and Tempe, Arizona.
