= OM Group =

Metal-based chemistry firm based in St. Louis, Missouri

Vectra
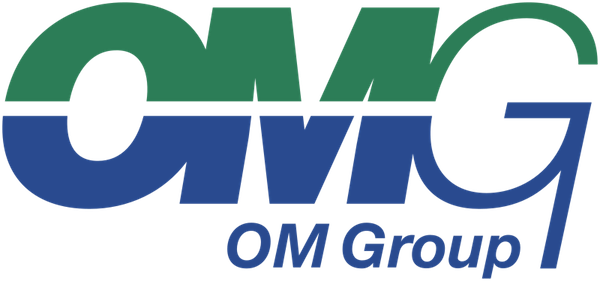
- Company type: Private
- Industry: Specialty Chemicals
- Fate: Acquired by Apollo Global Management
- Headquarters: St. Louis, Missouri, United States
- Area served: Worldwide
- Key people: Joseph Scaminace (Chairman and CEO)
- Products: Specialty chemicals
- Revenue: ▲US$1.64 billion(FY 2012)
- Operating income: ▼US$36.5 million (FY 2011)
- Net income: ▼US$42.0 (FY 2011)
- Total assets: ▼US$2.5 billion (FY 2012)
- Total equity: ▼US$1.2 billion (FY 2012)
- Number of employees: 6,800
- Website: www.omgi.com

Vectra is a private metal-based chemistry firm based in St. Louis, Missouri, United States. It is a provider of speciality chemicals, advanced materials and technologies. The company was listed on the New York Stock Exchange prior to being privatized by Apollo Global Management in June 2015.

== Overview of Operations ==
OM Group employs approximately 6,000 people and has locations in Canada, China, D.R. Congo, France, Finland, Germany, India, Japan, Malaysia, Singapore, Taiwan, the United Kingdom and the United States.

OMG has six business units:

- Advanced Organics
- Advanced Materials
- Electronic Chemicals
- Compugraphics
- Ultra Pure Chemicals
- Battery Technologies

Of these six units, its three main business platforms are: magnetic technologies, battery technologies and speciality chemicals.

OM Group supplies more than 4,000 customers, serving more than 50 industries worldwide, including automotive systems, electronic devices, aerospace, industrial and renewable energy.

== History ==
The roots of the company date back to the 1940s when the company's predecessor Mooney Chemical Company was founded in 1946 in Cleveland by namesake James Mooney and his partner Carl A. Reusser. Forging strong ties with copper and nickel miners in Zaire and Zambia, Mooney quickly became key supplier of the metals, helping maintain some of the highest levels of productivity in the cobalt specialty-chemicals industry. In the mid-1990s, for example, OM Group's sales per employee were more than double the industry average, at $850,000 compared with less than $300,000.

In the 1970s James Mooney's seventh son, James P. Mooney joined the firm at the age of just 23, joining three of his brothers in the executive office. Despite a reluctance to incur debt and therefore infrequent acquisitions, the brothers expanded the firm's product line through the purchases of Mobil Oil’s subsidiary in Pennsylvania, Chicago's Lauder Chemical, and Cleveland's Harshaw Chemical in the 1960s, 1970s, and 1980s. By 1984, the company's 40 employees generated about $2 million in annual sales.

After more than four decades of family ownership, numerous members of the Mooney family decided to sell their stakes in the business and in 1991, President James Mooney started to seek buyers.

OM Group Inc was established in 1993 as a result of the merger between the American company Mooney Chemicals, the Finnish firm Kokkola Chemicals Oy, and France’s Vasset SA. Initially named Outokumpu Metals Group when the merger went ahead in 1991, after which the company operated as a subsidiary of the Finnish firm, Kokkola spun off its 96 percent share in the company in 1993, leading to the establishment of the OM Group. Mooney continued to own a 4% share.

In the mid-nineties, the firm's geographical reach was dramatically expanded as a result of the merger and foreign sales increased by more than 50 percent. In 1994, the company invested $19.7 million in a physical plant, increasing its capacity to produce specialty chemicals.

In 1995, OM Group and Dainippon Ink & Chemicals created a Japan-based joint venture. OM hoped that its cooperative enterprise would capture 15 percent of the $470 million Japanese market for cobalt-nickel inorganic compounds by the turn of the century. Later in the year, OM entered the chemical recycling industry through the acquisition of Hecla Mining Co.'s Apex mining division in Utah.

== Recent news ==
On 10 August 2007, OM Group Incorporated acquired the electronics business of Rockwood Holdings Inc.. The Rockwood Electronics businesses consist of printed circuit board (PCB) chemicals, ultra pure chemicals (UPC) and photomasks.

EaglePicher Technologies was sold to OM Group Inc. in 2010.

In October 2014, OM Group acquired Ener-Tek International, a designer, developer and manufacturer of high-performance lithium-ion and silver-zinc cells and batteries for niche applications in defence and aerospace markets, for a fee of $24 million.

As a result of dwindling sales as a result of the slowdown in industrial activity in Europe in the preceding two years, in June 2015 OM Group agreed to be privatized by Apollo Global Management who made an offer of around $1.03 billion in cash.

On November 23, 2015, the company announced its name change to Vectra and said it was moving its headquarters to St. Louis, Missouri.

ST. LOUIS, Jan. 14, 2017 /PRNewswire/ — Vectra Co. (“Vectra”), a leading technology-driven diversified company serving global markets, announced today that it has completed the sale of its Borchers business division to affiliates of The Jordan Company, L.P. (“Jordan”), a U.S.-based private equity firm with original capital commitments in excess of $8 billion.
