= Snapfish Lab =

- Website type: Corporate Research Website
- Owner: Hewlett-Packard
- Creator: HP Labs
- Website: www.snapfishlab.com
- Commercial: Yes
- Registration: Optional
- Launched: 2008
- Current status: Public Beta

Snapfish Lab was a web portal and application framework that HP Labs provided to showcase some of its imaging research, and to solicit feedback from users and the imaging research community.

== Overview ==
The site contained a series of new experimental imaging tools. A set of sample photographs allowed the user to try the tools without registering. If users logged on with their Snapfish user credentials they could use the tools on their own photograph collections. A discussion forum allowed users to give feedback on their experience.

== Company Structure ==
Snapfish Lab was a service of HP Labs, the research and advanced development division of Hewlett-Packard.

== Imaging Tools ==
The experimental imaging tools provided by the site were:

- Poster Creator allowed users to combine multiple photographs into a single large sheet of paper. An automatic algorithm, Blocked Recursive Image Composition, automatically arranged the photographs. The user could choose between alternate automatic layouts and fine-tune the results by swapping photographs or cropping them.
- Auto Crop used face detection and a proprietary saliency analysis algorithm to find the most important parts of a photograph. It then used aesthetic rules to crop the photograph to increase the proportion of the image that was filled with salient content while avoiding violating rules of composition.
- Note Capture took photographs of some text or graphics on a page or a whiteboard and fixed the perspective distortion to produce the original rectangle.
- Clear Note extended Note Capture by using a watershed image segmentation algorithm to separate out the foreground writing from the background surface. This allowed it to convert the background to white, producing an image that was more suitable for printing.
- Fisheye Visualization presented an interactive view of an album of photographs as an array of images where the sizes and positions were distorted as if a fisheye lens were following the cursor. This gave the user an overview of the entire album as small thumbnails while giving them a movable magnified view of some photographs.
- Automatic Horizon Alignment analyzed a photograph to look for a near-horizontal line. If it found one it rotated the photograph slightly to make the line perfectly horizontal. This was intended to straighten snapshots in which the horizon is not level

== See also ==
Other corporate research websites include:

- Google Labs
- Yahoo! Next
