= Imagekind =

imagekind.com
- Company type: S Corporation
- Website type: online market
- Available in: English
- Headquarters: Portland, Oregon, USA
- Key people: Aleks Davidovich (CEO); Chris Keenan (CTO)
- Industry: Custom products
- Products: Electronic commerce, Shopping mall
- Website: www.imagekind.com
- Registration: Required to buy and sell

Imagekind is a commercial website that prints and sells images created by participating artists on-demand. It also includes a social networking and marketing site for artists and their customers. It was founded in Seattle, Washington in 2006 by Adrian Hanauer, a Seattle, Washington co-owner of the Seattle Sounders professional soccer team, and Kelly Smith, a software & digital media specialist who formed Curious Office as an incubator of online companies. It is now owned by CafePress.

== Website ==
Imagekind is an online art website where artists working in 2-dimensional art forms may upload digital files of their work. The work is then displayed on the website in "galleries" where customers may buy print-on-demand inkjet prints (giclée) of the work. After an order is submitted, the company custom prints the uploaded image. Artists set and keep their own markup from the sales of their artwork.

Images are printed on large variety of substrates (including canvas and paper) using Epson large format Ultra-Chrome inkjet printers. Currently, Imagekind has over 3 million images for sale and also offers framing services for purchased prints. Framing and matting is provided by Northwest Framing in Portland, Oregon

The website encourages social interaction through its associated blog. Aside from member art, the website also offers a large selection of posters and prints with licensed images by artists ranging from Michelangelo to Dalí to Mapplethorpe.

Imagekind formed a partnership with EBSQ, an online art association of self-representing artists in October 2008, and were acquired by CafePress in July 2008.

As of 2025, the imagekind website is non-functional.
