= GoodLife Fitness =

Largest health club company in Canada

GoodLife Fitness Centres Inc.
- Type: Private
- Industry: Fitness
- Founded: 1979
- Founder: David Patchell-Evans
- Headquarters: London, Ontario, Canada
- Number of locations: 450+ clubs
- Area served: NL, PE, NS, NB, ON, MB, SK, AB, BC, QC,
- Number of employees: 10,000+
- Subsidiaries: Fit4Less; Éconofitness; Oxygen Yoga & Fitness; Revo Fitness; CityFitness
- Website: goodlifefitness.com

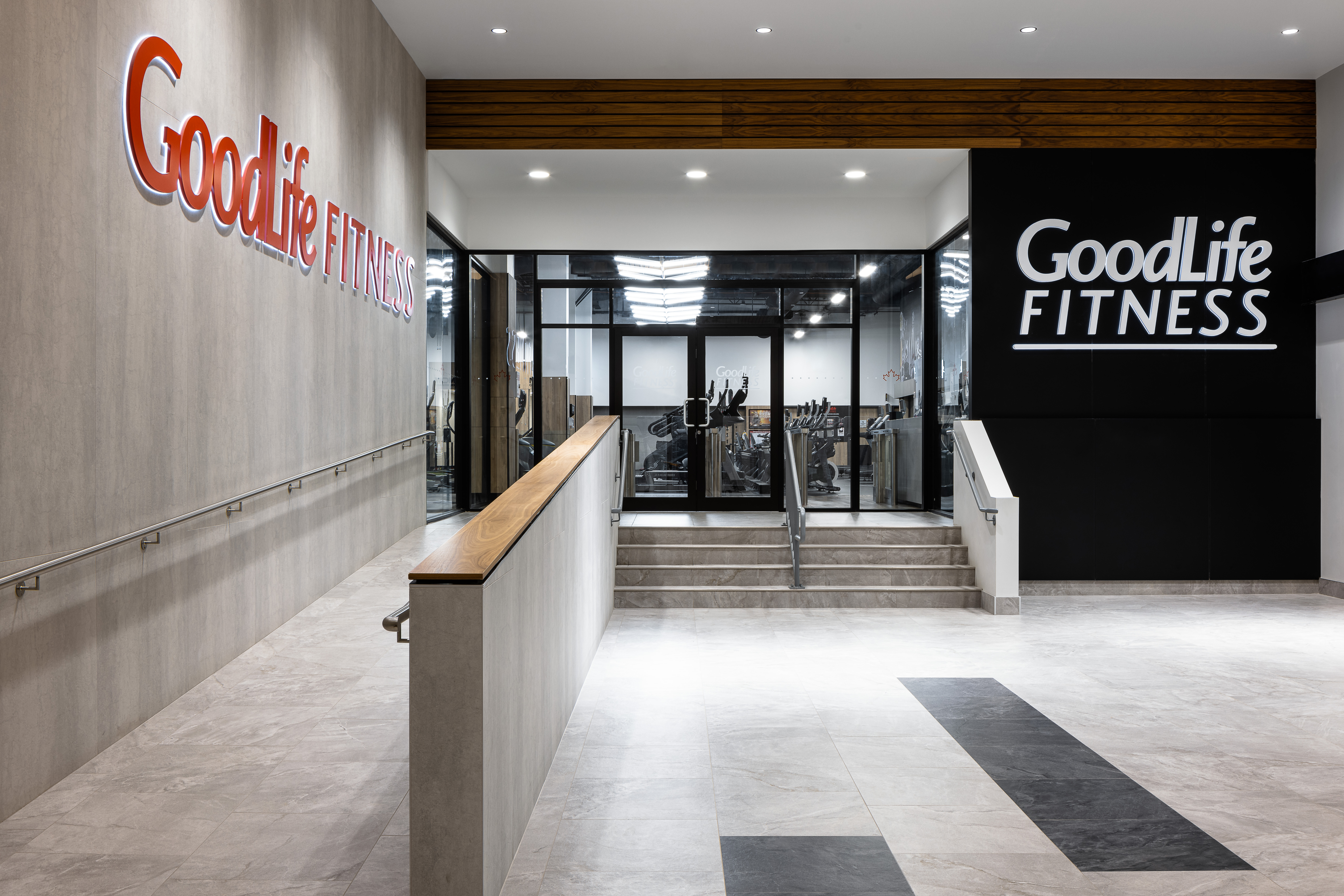
GoodLife Fitness in the Winnipeg Refinery District

GoodLife Fitness Centres Inc. is a Canadian franchisor and operator of fitness centres based London, Ontario. It is the largest health club company in Canada with over 450 locations across the country, under the banner of four brands.

== History and background ==
GoodLife was founded in 1979 in London, Ontario by David Patchell-Evans. After suffering multiple broken bones following a motorcycle accident, Patchell-Evans began to workout following rehabilitation. He later bought the gym he exercised in.

=== Brands ===
In addition to more than 200+ clubs under the GoodLife Fitness brand, the company also operates the low-cost fitness companies Fit4Less and Éconofitness (Quebec). Between GoodLife Fitness and its sister brands, the company operates over 450 different fitness locations in Canada.

=== Acquisitions ===
GoodLife purchased the 'Alliance' and 'Family Fitness' club chains in 2007–2008. By October 2011, the brand had over 275 clubs across Canada. In 2009, GoodLife Fitness expanded into Eastern Canada by acquiring Nubody's family of clubs. GoodLife Fitness also partnered with Energie Cardio in Quebec in that same year. GoodLife Fitness has been rumored to be taking over the Target Canada locations, that are currently abandoned.

In December 2012, GoodLife acquired seven independently operated Gold's Gym locations in Canada. The locations include three clubs in Calgary and one in Airdrie, Alberta, as well as locations in Peterborough, Vaughan and Scarborough in Ontario. This made GoodLife the largest fitness club chain in the Calgary Region with 13 locations. The total number of GoodLife Clubs in Alberta increased to 16, spanning from Calgary to Lethbridge to Edmonton.

On April 1, 2013, GoodLife Fitness announced its acquisition of Extreme Fitness Inc., a leading operator of fitness clubs in the Greater Toronto Area and surrounding region. This acquisition brought the total number of GoodLife Fitness Clubs in Canada to over 300, with 82 in the Greater Toronto Area.

== Partnerships ==
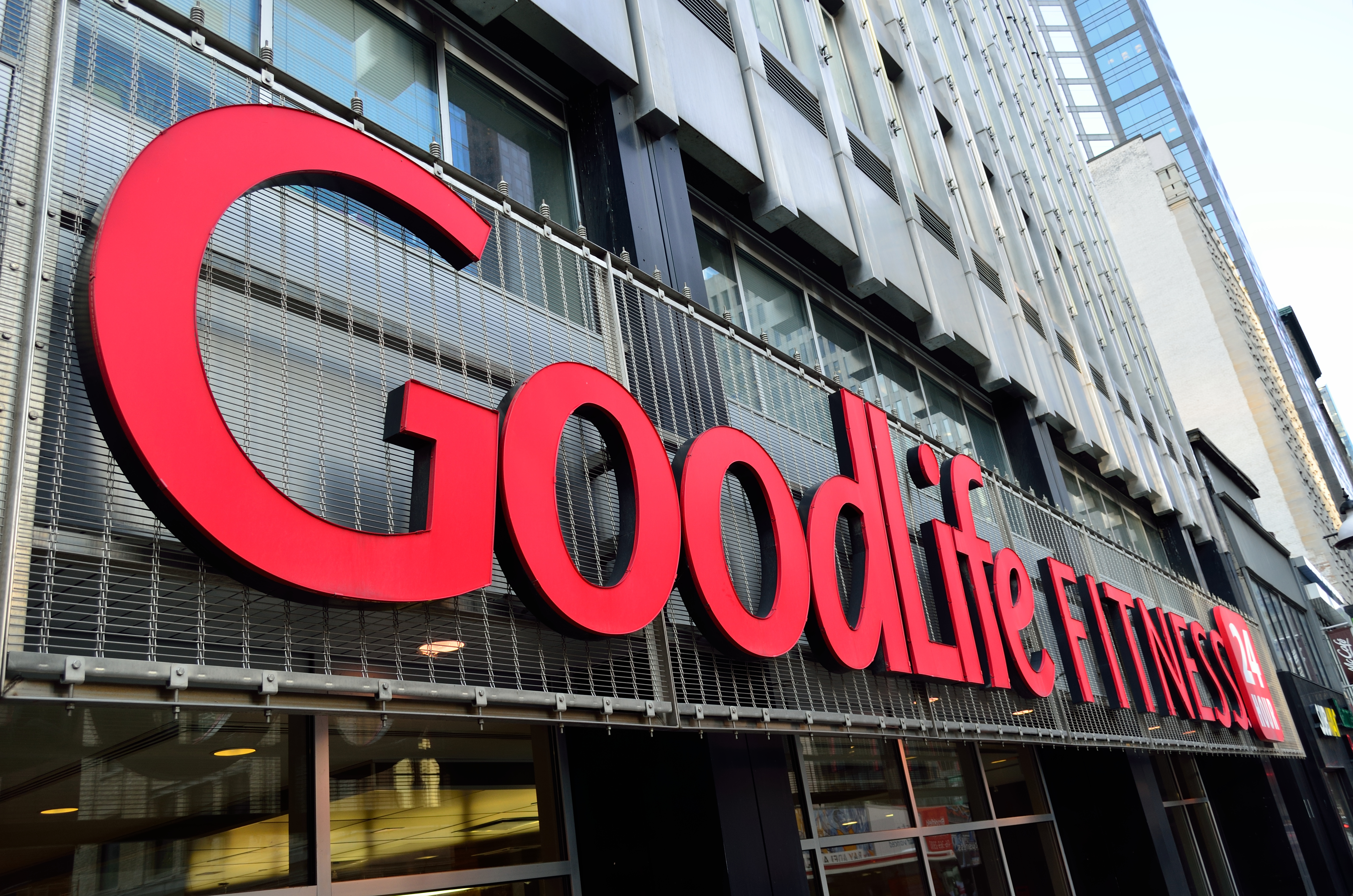
GoodLife Fitness in the Toronto Financial District

In June 2005, GoodLife became the official Canadian Agent of Les Mills International programs, the world's largest provider of choreographed exercise-to-music group fitness classes.

In February 2013, GoodLife Fitness announced a partnership to become the exclusive provider of Jillian Michaels BODYSHRED in Canada.

== Criticisms ==
In 2005, a federal Competition Bureau investigation found that GoodLife Fitness clubs had published misleading ads. In a settlement, Goodlife Fitness published a corrective notice in newspapers throughout central Canada and on its website, paying a $75,000 CAD penalty and agreeing not to make false/misleading representations in future marketing.

In January 2011, GoodLife Fitness came in second place in the CBC Big Gym Ripoff survey ranking gyms with the most problems with over-billing and cancellations.

In January 2011, GoodLife Fitness was caught in a media backlash, after one customer who was attempting to cancel his membership was allegedly 'roughed-up' by security guards at its Rideau Centre location; And after another, at its Orleans location, was chastised and banned for chatting about the benefits of other fitness clubs. The incidents drew attention to strong armed-sales tactics reported by employees and clients.

In 2011, GoodLife Fitness was fined $300,000 for illegally using automated calling devices, known as robocalls, to contact its members, without their prior consent, to advertise the opening of a new club. As part of a settlement with the CRTC, Goodlife Fitness published notices about the violation in newspapers and on its website.

In October 2016, a class action lawsuit was launched against Goodlife Fitness alleging that it had failed to pay certain employees of its Ontario gyms some of the wages they were owed under Ontario law. The members of the proposed class would have included all non-managerial employees for a period beginning October 14, 2014. In July 2018, the court approved a $7.5 million settlement of the proposed class action.

== In media ==
GoodLife Fitness has taken part in Undercover Boss Canada and Canada Sings.
