= Teespring =

Custom clothing merchandise platform

Spring, Inc.
- Website type: E-commerce
- Founded: August 2011; 15 years ago Providence, Rhode Island, U.S.
- Dissolved: September 15, 2026; 2 months ago
- Headquarters: San Francisco, California, U.S.
- Founders: Walker Williams; Evan Stites-Clayton
- Website: https://spri.ng

Teespring, officially rebranded in 2021 to Spring, was a social commerce platform that allowed people to create and sell custom products. The company was founded in 2011 by Walker Williams and Evan Stites-Clayton in Providence, Rhode Island. By 2014, the company had raised $55 million in venture capital from Khosla Ventures and Andreessen Horowitz. In 2018, Spring launched its merchandise shelf integration in partnership with YouTube, enabling creators to sell their products directly below video content, and expanded this business model with similar integrations for Twitch, Instagram, TikTok, etc. in the years following. Over the past few years, Teespring has had to make significant reforms to its safety operations in response to criticism over apparel that promoted violence and racist messaging. In 2019, Chris Lamontagne became CEO of Spring, and in 2021, Teespring was rebranded as Spring.

== Business model ==
Individuals create campaigns in order to sell custom products on Teespring. Campaign creators are expected to design and market the product themselves. Teespring fulfills orders on campaigns that have reached a minimum sales goal (called "tipped" campaigns), and ships items to the buyers. Products are printed or manufactured in various screen-printing facilities. Teespring handles distribution of the products and customer service. Teespring offers various apparel such as T-shirts, hoodies, sweatshirts, leggings and children's wear.

== History ==
Brown University students Walker Williams and Evan Stites-Clayton first attempted to create a company linking students with internships called Jobzle in 2010. When the popular, student-oriented Providence dive bar Fish Co. appeared to be going out of business in 2011, they designed T-shirts that said "FREE FISHCO". Unable to pay to print a batch of T-shirts, they created a one-page website where the shirts could be pre-ordered. While they needed 200 orders to cover their costs, they sold over 400 T-shirts, making $2,000.

After receiving numerous requests from other organizations asking for a custom campaign, Walker and Evan decided to pursue the concept of crowdfunded custom apparel full-time.

Rhode Island angel investors Bill Cesare and Mark Weiner invested the first $600,000 in seed funding. The company officially launched in October 2012 in Providence, Rhode Island.

== Growth ==
In October 2012, the company announced they had reached over $500,000 in monthly sales. In March 2013, the company reported $750,000 in monthly revenue and a 50% month-over-month growth rate.

In December 2013, Teespring was accepted into the start-up accelerator Y-Combinator which is based in Mountain View, California. Within two weeks of finishing the three-month accelerator, Teespring raised another $1.3 million including $500,000 from Sam Altman, then president at Y-Combinator. In January 2014, Teespring closed a Series A round of $20 million from venture capital firm Andreessen Horowitz. Andreessen partner Laars Dalgaard, formerly of SuccessFactors, led the investment, his first with the firm. In November 2014, partner Keith Rabois joined the company's board and the company announced the closure of its Series B funding round with $35 million from Khosla Ventures and also including Andreessen.

A new manufacturing facility in Kentucky was expected to create hundreds of jobs and by 2015, Teespring had expanded to around 300 employees in the United States. The company had employed 120 workers in Providence before reducing the number to 52 by June 2015. By 2016, the entire Rhode Island staff had been laid off and the company announced plans to close its office there.

== Criticism ==
Teespring has been criticized for creating apparel that promotes violence and includes racist messaging. While the company claims that it monitors designs for offensive content, it has continually gained attention for its controversial designs.

=== 2017 ===
In May 2017, Teespring caused controversy by selling T-shirts that featured the words, "Black Women Are Trash," resulting in many Twitter users calling for a boycott of the platform. Teespring's director of seller success, Brett Miller, responded, "Once we learned of the error we immediately took steps to remove all content in question and ban the offending seller from our platform. We have since fixed the issue."

In August 2017, Teespring was blamed for selling products claiming to "reclaim" the swastika, considered a symbol of hate. KA Design listed rainbow swastika designs on Teespring in an attempt to rebrand the contested symbol used by the Nazis. Jewish groups called for a boycott of Teespring following news of the controversial products. Another T-shirt offered on the site in October 2017 bore the message "Eat Sleep Rape Repeat".

In November 2017, Walmart removed a shirt bearing the words "Rope. Tree. Journalist. Some assembly required" from its website, following a complaint from Radio Television Digital News Association, a journalist advocacy group. The shirt was listed on Walmart's website through Teespring (as a third-party seller). Time magazine reported that at the time, according to the U.S. Press Freedom Tracker, there had been 35 physical attacks on journalists so far in 2017. An analysis by USA Today found that the site was selling T-shirts reading "Hitler did nothing wrong" and one with an image of Bill Cosby paired with the slogan "drinks on me ladies".

=== 2018 ===
In April 2018, the company came under fire for providing items for sale that celebrated Dylann Roof, a neo-Nazi mass murderer.

In June 2018, an article by Alex Dalbey in The Daily Dot detailed criticism on social media of Teespring for pulling a line of T-shirts featuring the term "TERFs" (short for trans-exclusionary radical feminists). The most notable design stated "Fuck TERFs". Teespring said the T-shirt "violates our Hate Speech section of our acceptable use policy".

In 2018, a Women's March spokesperson told CNN that "many of these fake pages are used to sell merchandise, with the proceeds benefiting individuals instead of our movement. The efforts to capitalize on movement work isn't new, but it is frustrating, particularly as we make an effort to only sell ethically sourced and produced merchandise — a rule these imposter pages don't abide by."

=== 2020 ===
Following the death of Caroline Flack in February 2020, Teespring received criticism for selling counterfeit versions of the "Be Kind" T-shirts created by Leigh Francis to raise money for the mental health charity The Samaritans. Teespring received criticism for allowing the sale of the counterfeit T-shirts to go ahead, preventing the charity from receiving funds.

In August 2020, Teespring reported that the word 'antifa' was in violation of their acceptable use policy.

=== 2021 ===
On January 6, 2021, the US Capitol was invaded by rioters. In a viral photo, one rioter is wearing a Camp Auschwitz T-shirt. On January 11, 2021, Teespring removed and apologized for the sale of Camp Auschwitz shirts on its platform.

=== 2022 ===
In November 2022, Amaze Software acquired Spring's assets for an undisclosed fee, and the service subsequently operated as Spring by Amaze.

=== 2023 ===
Spring has faced lawsuits from several vendors and business partners, with Fair Capital debt collection agency representing some of these vendors in their efforts to retrieve the unpaid debt. In total, the lawsuits are seeking over $1.5 million in payments, along with other unspecified damages.

2025

== Rebranding and acquisition ==
On February 1, 2021, Teespring announced they were transitioning to a new brand name, Spring.

On November 8, 2022, Amaze Software Inc. announced the acquisition of Spring.

== See also ==
- RushOrderTees
- CustomInk
- RedBubble
- Spread_Group
