= David Patchell-Evans =

Canadian entrepreneur and business executive

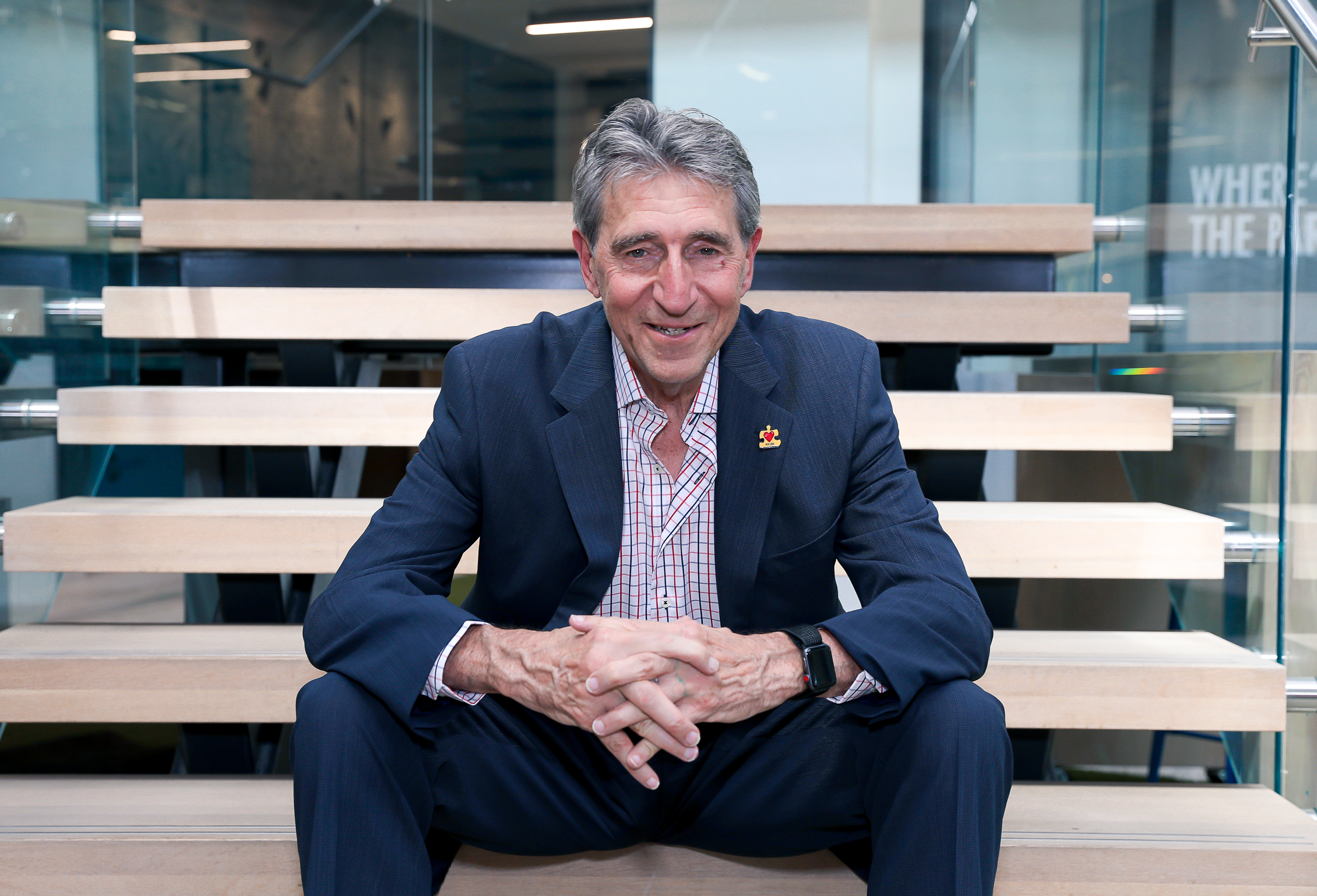
- David 'Patch' Patchell-Evans
- Other name: 'Patch'
- Education: University of Western Ontario
- Occupations: Entrepreneur and business executive
- Known for: Founder and CEO of GoodLife Fitness
- Term: 1979–present
- Spouse: Silken Laumann

David 'Patch' Patchell-Evans is a Canadian entrepreneur and business executive. He is best known as the founder and Chairman of GoodLife Fitness.

== Early life and education ==
Patch began studying at the University of Western Ontario in 1973. He graduated in 1977 with an Honours degree in physical education and a minor in Business.

== Career ==
=== Early career and GoodLife Fitness ===
Two weeks after beginning his university studies, Patch was involved in a serious motorcycle accident that caused multiple injuries to his upper body. During eight-month rehabilitation process, he would become increasingly interested in the role physical fitness plays in injury recovery and prevention.

Using funds from his snow plowing business, he purchased a small fitness club in London, Ontario in 1979. This 200-square-meter facility would go on to become the first-ever GoodLife Fitness Club.

By 2023, GoodLife Fitness became the largest fitness club chain in Canada and the fourth largest in the world.

=== Expansion and partnerships ===
Under Patch's leadership as CEO, the GoodLife group of clubs would grow to include GoodLife Fitness, Fit4Less, Éconofitness and Oxygen Yoga & Fitness.

In 1993, Patch established canfitpro,.

Patch also owns CityFitness, the largest fitness club chain in New Zealand. He is also a significant partner in REVO Fitness in Australia, and AyrFit in Alberta, Canada.

Patch has partnered with George Foreman III to expand its presence across the United States.

== Philanthropy ==
=== GoodLife Kids Foundation ===
In 1998, Patch founded the GoodLife Kids Foundation to help give Canadian kids with special needs the opportunity to live fit and healthy lives. GoodLife Kids Foundation has reached more than 260,000 kids and youth across Canada with supports for physical activity. Since 2018, the organization has focused on providing physical activity opportunities for kids and youth with autism and intellectual disabilities.

Today, the MOVE by GoodLife Kids Program delivers regular virtual workouts to kids and youth with autism and intellectual disabilities, as well as their families. As of 2023, the program is also offered in person at Janus Academy in Calgary, Alberta, and more recently at high schools in Brampton and Mississauga, Ontario, with plans to introduce in-person options at GoodLife Fitness Clubs.

=== Supporting autism research ===
Patch has donated more than $11 million to autism research leading to important strides and collaborations, most notably with the Karolinska Institute in Sweden.

In 2016, Patch pledged $5 million to help build the GoodLife Fitness Autism Hub in Richmond, BC. The knowledge centre incorporates state of the art resources for research, information, learning, assessment, treatment and support addressing the lifespan needs of individuals with autism spectrum disorder and their families.

In 2007, Patch was recognized with the Canadian Medical Association Medal of Honour (now called the Owen Adams Medal of Honour) – the highest honour given outside the medical profession in Canada – for his support of autism research and education.

== Recognition ==
- In 2012, Patch was awarded with an honorary Doctor of Laws degree from the University of Western Ontario. This degree acknowledged his achievements as a fitness entrepreneur, as well as a community leader and supporter of autism research.
- Patch has been recognized as Canadian Venture Capital and Private Equity Association's Entrepreneur of the Year, as well as Canadian Business Magazine's Most Innovative CEO, and Ernst & Yonge's Entrepreneur of the Year.
- In 2015, GoodLife Fitness was recognized as one of Canada's Top 10 Corporate Cultures. In the same year, Patch was named Canada's Most Admired CEO – the first and only time a CEO and his company have received the award in the same year.
- Patch was selected for the 2019 Ontario Chamber of Commerce Lifetime Achievement Award, which is given to a proven achiever and strong contributor to Ontario's economy.
- In 2021, Patch was inducted into the Canadian Business Hall of Fame, joining 200 other notable and accomplished business leaders in Canada.
