= Redbubble =

Global online print-on-demand marketplace

Redbubble Ltd
- Logo since 2012
- Industry: Online, on demand marketplace for artists
- Founded: 2006; 20 years ago
- Founders: Martin Hosking, Pete Styles, Paul Vanzella, Phoebe Stephens
- Headquarters: San Francisco & Melbourne
- Key people: Vivek Kumar (CEO)
- Products: Customized products with original art work
- Revenue: A$290.7 million (FY23)
- Parent: Articore (ASX: ATG)
- Website: redbubble.com

Redbubble is a global online marketplace for print-on-demand products based on user-submitted artwork. The company was founded in 2006 in Melbourne, Australia, and also maintains offices in San Francisco and Berlin.

The company operates primarily on the internet/websites and allows its members to sell their artwork as decoration on a variety of products. Products include prints, T-shirts, phone cases, hoodies, cushions, duvet covers, leggings, stickers, dresses, and scarves. The company offers free membership to artists who maintain the copyrights to their work, regulate their own prices, and decide which products may display their images.

In fiscal year 2023 Redbubble had 5.0M customers, buying 4.8M different designs, from 650K artists.

Redbubble is a part of Articore Group Limited, which is publicly traded as ATG on the Australian Securities Exchange.

== History ==
The company was founded in 2006 by Martin Hosking, Peter Styles, and Paul Vanzella after raising $2 million in investor capital. On 16 June 2011, Hosking left his position at Aconex to focus on his job as CEO of Redbubble.

In March 2014, it was reported that 51,900 artists have successfully sold their creations on Redbubble, generating more than $15 million in earnings. At the time it was estimated that eight million unique viewers visited the site every month.

In 2015, Redbubble raised A$15.5 million in funding from various investors including Melbourne-based Acorn Capital and London based investor Piton Capital.

Since February 2015, Redbubble has been running an artist residency program at their Melbourne office. The purpose of the program is to enable selected artists with the opportunity to produce artwork at Redbubble artist studio while collaborating with other artists.

The company was listed on the Australian Securities Exchange in May 2016.

In January 2017, Hosking reported 450,000 active artists and 10 million site visits per month. In the last ten years, almost 7 million people have bought products from the site, generating $70 million earned by artists.

In June 2018, it was announced that Hosking would be stepping down as CEO. COO Barry Newstead, who had been with the company since 2013, took over as CEO in August 2018.

In October 2018, Redbubble acquired US-based TeePublic for $57.7 million. In February 2020, Newstead was ousted as CEO after the company's non-executive directors decided a change in leadership was necessary. In January 2021, Michael Ilczynski joined the company as CEO. He resigned in March 2023.

In November 2023, Redbubble Group (owner of Redbubble and TeePublic) rebranded as Articore.

On 2 June 2025, Vivek Kumar was appointed Group CEO.

== Controversy ==
=== Offensive materials ===
In June 2011, The Register and The Age reported that artists on Redbubble were offering T-shirts images taken from the satirical online comic strip Hipster Hitler. Some Redbubble users perceived the comic and its products as antisemitic, pressuring PayPal to investigate whether it violated their policy. In May 2011 Arnold Bloch Leibler, a law firm with connections to the Australian Jewish community, severed their business relationship with Redbubble for "promoting Nazism". Both Redbubble's CEO, Martin Hosking, and the head of B'nai B'rith's Anti Defamation Commission recognized Hipster Hitler as parody but noted that it was being misunderstood – this was due in part to the limited context of the merchandise and stories that some hate groups had allegedly praised Hipster Hitler – and discussed how best to deal with such work. Three weeks later on 5 June 2011, The Age reported that Hosking, who had originally defended the work as free speech, removed the entire Hipster Hitler merchandise line and said the guidelines would be changed to "prohibit parodies of genocide and the Holocaust, as well as other material likely to cause deep offence". Such a statement does not appear literally or clearly semantically in Redbubble's community guidelines. At the same time he said it was hard to take a nuanced approach to removing Hipster Hitler merchandise due to the nature of the controversy. Hosking's decision to pull Hipster Hitler's line was applauded by the Simon Wiesenthal Center as being responsive to both artists and the Jewish community. On 12 and 15 June 2011 articles by digital media company Ninemsn and news web site Stuff.co.nz reported that artists on Redbubble were selling baby clothes featuring pictures of Hitler, Osama bin Laden and serial killers Ivan Milat, Ted Bundy and Charles Manson.

According to a 9 September 2011 article in the Herald Sun, more than 100 children's items remained on sale, some with "four-letter swear words" and drug images. In 2012, the Los Angeles Times reported that due to outrage over the death of Trayvon Martin, artists on Redbubble were offering a hoodie with a version of a "Neighborhood Watch" sign, which warns, darkly, "We immediately murder all suspicious persons".

As of February 25, 2024, users can tag designs as mature content. Artists should indicate that their work is mature content as a part of the upload process, however, this can also be done at any time using the edit work function. Marking their work as mature content ensures that it will only be seen by viewers who choose to include this content while browsing Redbubble, and it will not be indexed off-site. Failure to comply with this guideline may result in account restriction or closure.

=== Trademark infringement ===
In 2019, the Hells Angels Motorcycle Club sued Redbubble in the Federal Court of Australia for infringing on its trademark, launching another suit in 2021 after providing evidence that Redbubble had continued to breach the trademark. The 2019 case concluded with the Hells Angels being awarded $5,000 in damages. In July 2022, in the second ruling against Redbubble, the company was ordered to pay the club more than $78,000.

== Awards ==
Since 2008, Redbubble has been nominated and won a series of awards, including:

- June 2008: BRW, 3rd-ranked Australian 2.0 Website
- August 2008: Interactive Media Association, two Best-in-Class awards
- May 2009: The Webby Awards, nominee – Community
- June 2009: Interactive Media Association, finalist Top 10 Sites of 2008
- July 2009: Telstra Business Awards, finalist MYOB Small Business
- September 2009: Web Marketing Association, Outstanding Achievement in Web Development
- November 2009: Deloitte Technology Fast 50, Rising Star Runner-up
- February 2010: Next Web, Runner-up, Most Likely to Change the World
- March 2010: AIMIA, Finalist Cultural or Lifestyle, Social Media
- August 2010: Smart Company Award, Best Website Under 20 Employees
- September 2010: Web Marketing Association, Outstanding Achievement in Web Development
- October 2012: BRW, BRW FAST 100
- November 2012: Deloitte Technology, Fast 50, 2012 winner
- December 2012: Deloitte Technology, Fast 500, Asia Pacific 2012 winner
- November 2013: SmartCompany, Web Awards 2013 – Best company website (over 20 employees)
- December 2013: Pixel Awards, nominee – Art
- May 2015: Two Hermes Awards

== See also ==
- CafePress
- Custom Ink
- List of self-publishing companies
- RushOrderTees
- Shutterfly
