= LendingPoint =

Financial technology platform

- Type: Private
- Founded: July 2014
- Headquarters: 1201 Roberts Boulevard #200, Kennesaw, GA 30144, United States
- Products: Personal loans, point-of-purchase finance
- Website: www.lendingpoint.com

LendingPoint is a financial technology platform. The company looks at a person's complete financial picture, taking into consideration credit history, employment history, earning potential, and other data to determine creditworthiness. LendingPoint gives access to more affordable loans for consumers with credit scores between 500 and 850 and discounts traditional creditworthiness factors, such as FICO scores, debt-to-income (DTI) ratios, and payment-to-income (PTI) ratios. It was founded in 2014 by Tom Burnside, Franck Fatras, Victor J. Pacheco, and Juan E. Tavares.

== History ==
LendingPoint launched its first consumer loan product in January 2015. In October 2015, LendingPoint announced a $100 million credit facility with funds managed by the Tradable Credit and Direct Lending groups of Ares Management. Two months later, LendingPoint signed an additional credit facility for $5 million of incremental financing with Aeterna Capital Partners.

In August 2016, former American Express executive Houman Motaharian joined LendingPoint as Chief Revenue Officer. By the end of 2016, LendingPoint had funded more than $100 million in consumer loans across 13 states.

LendingPoint signed an exclusive partnership with ezVerify in 2017 on a new service called ezCarePoint, which allows patients to predict their out-of-pocket expenses and apply for flexible payment plans and loans to cover the costs of medical procedures. On August 22, 2017, LendingPoint closed an up to $500 million credit facility arranged by Guggenheim Securities.

On January 11, 2018, the company announced that it had acquired the merchant portal technology and other assets of LoanHero, a fintech platform for point-of-sale finance. That same month, LendingPoint Merchant Solutions combined the merchant onboarding and reporting tools acquired from LoanHero. On May 17, 2018, LendingPoint announced that it had closed another credit facility also arranged by Guggenheim Securities. On June 28, 2018, LendingPoint upsized its mezzanine financing, bringing the total of its mezzanine credit facility to $52.5 million.

In July 2020, LendingPoint introduced a merchant lending platform called SDKn, which provides an online consumer loan pre-approval portal for companies. LendingPoint partnered with eBay in August 2020 to offer installment loans up to 48 months to eBay’s merchants. Dubbed eBay Seller Capital, the program allows sellers on the e-commerce platform to borrow up to $25,000 with no origination fees or early payback fees. In October 2020, LendingPoint closed its first revolving and largest ever asset-backed security (ABS) issuance at $328.5 million.

In January 2021, the company was funded $125 million via a preferred equity investment from Warburg Pincus. LendingPoint has issued more than $2.3 billion in consumer loans nationwide since 2015.

In May 2022, LendingPoint announced a partnership with the Illinois-based, community-based financial holding company Midland States Bank. The deal entailed Midland funding consumer loans with its underwriting criteria through the LendingPoint network of point-of-sale retail relationships.
