= Spread Group =

Custom merchandising platform

sprd.net AG
- Company type: Joint-stock company
- Industry: Customized apparel and accessories
- Founded: May 2002; 24 years ago (then Spreadshirt GbR); Leipzig, Germany
- Founders: Lukasz Gadowski; Matthias Spieß
- Headquarters: Gießerstr. 27, Leipzig, Germany
- Key people: Dr. Julian de Grahl (CEO); Tobias Schaugg (CFO); Jürgen Krisch (CTO); Hugo Smoter (CCO); Hanne Dinkel (CCDO); Lukasz Gadowski (Supervisory Board Chairman)
- Products: Apparel and accessories
- Services: Screen printing, digital printing, flock printing, flex printing, digital transfer, vinyl printing, thermal sublimation
- Revenue: ▲US$195 million (2020)
- Number of employees: c. 1000 (2020)
- Website: www.spreadgroup.com

Spread Group (legally sprd.net AG) is the umbrella brand of five internationally active e-commerce platforms with headquarters in Leipzig, Germany and Greensburg, Pennsylvania, United States. It operates production sites in Legnica, Poland, Krupka, Czech Republic and Henderson, Nevada, United States. Founded in 2002 as a student start-up, the name "Spreadshirt" has become part of today's group of companies: Spreadshirt Create Your Own, Spreadshirt Marketplaces, Spreadshop, TeamShirts and SPOD (Spreadshirt Print-on-Demand).

All business transactions are conducted through the Internet: The Shop Owner uploads graphics, logos, etc. online, and uses these to customize products. Spread Group then handles all the necessary actions — from warehousing to production, shipping, payment processing and customer service — to distribute those custom merchandising products online.

== History ==
=== Spreadshirt era (2001-2020) ===
Spreadshirt was founded on 20 June 2002 by Lukasz Gadowski and Matthias Spieß. Spieß already had experience in founding companies. The other managing director, Michael Petersen, joined the company as a partner in the summer of 2004. In 2006, the company form was changed from a GmbH (limited liability company) to an AG (joint-stock company). Spreadshirt had a revenue of ca. €8.7 million in 2005 and 190 employees as of January 2006.

London-based venture-capital firm Accel Partners invested in Spreadshirt in 2006. Some of the money was used to buy French company la Fraise, which hosted Europe's largest ongoing T-shirt design contest online.

On 1 August 2007, Gadowski relinquished his position as chairman of the board of directors at Spreadshirt. He has continued as chairman of the supervisory board since 2008. Gadowski's successor was Jana Eggers, a U.S. citizen who was CEO of Spreadshirt until November 2010. In May 2011, former Chief Marketing Officer Philip Rooke was appointed CEO. Co-founder and former CTO Matthias Spieß has been on the supervisory board since July 2014.

In July 2014, Spreadshirt added the corporate brand Yink to Spreadshirt.de. Yink had emerged from Deutsche Druckservice (later Spreadshirt Bulk). The volume-order service has been part of the portfolio since 2004, and still remains a division of Spreadshirt today.

La Fraise closed its company gates in July 2014, but its Irish subsidiary La Fraise Ltd. still exists as of May 2022.

In 2015, the fifth production site was established in Krupka.

On 7 January 2016, Spreadshirt announced the closure of the Spreadshirt Manufacturing Deutschland GmbH in Leipzig, laying off 26 employees. This production site handled 10% of the European order volume. As of January 2016, there were two other European production sites in Legnica (Poland) and Krupka (Czech Republic).

=== Spread Group (2020-current) ===
In November 2020, Spreadshirt was renamed to Spread Group.

In December 2020, Spread Group announced that Dr. Julian de Grahl would take over as CEO starting April 2021.

In 2020, Spread Group had a revenue of US$195 million and about 1000 employees.

In July 2021, Spreadshirt suffered a data breach in which customer data, such as addresses and banking information, was accessed.

== Brands ==
With its "Spreadshirt" brand, the social-commerce company provides its users with an online platform that can be used to customize and buy T-shirts, but also to offer these custom products for sale on a marketplace. The Spreadshop brand offers users a comprehensive online shop system to run their own T-shirt shop and integrate it into their existing websites. Groups can create matching outfits with the TeamShirts brand, and SPOD (Spreadshirt Print-on-Demand) connects users of external online shop systems, as e.g. Shopify with Spread Group's production sites.

== Awards ==
- Online-Star 2006 Entrepreneur of the Year: Lukasz Gadowski
- Europe's 500 2006
- Red Herring 100 Europe Award 2006

== Facts ==
- Spread Group's European marketplace now contains more than 8,000,000 T-shirt designs that can be combined in a plethora of ways on over 200 different products.
- Sales in 2019 amounted to $146 million. In total, Spread Group shipped over 6.4 million products printed on demand to some 170 countries.

== See also ==
- RushOrderTees
- Redbubble
- Shutterfly
