= District Photo =

- Company type: Private
- Industry: Photo products, Printing
- Founded: 1949; 77 years ago
- Headquarters: Beltsville, Maryland, United States
- Products: Ink Printing, Silver Halide, Sublimation, Photo products
- Subsidiaries: Truprint
- Website: www.districtphoto.com

District Photo is a digital imaging services company headquartered in Beltsville, Maryland, United States. The company started in 1949 as a black-and-white photograph developing laboratory. It now serves large retail chains that offer photo development services, such as Costco and Walgreens, and has a national mail order film business.
