= CafePress =

Online retailer of stock and user-customized on-demand products

CafePress, Inc.
- Type: Subsidiary
- Traded as: Nasdaq: PRSS
- Industry: E-commerce
- Founded: 1999; 27 years ago
- Founders: Fred Durham; Maheesh Jain
- Headquarters: Louisville, Kentucky, United States
- Key people: Fred Durham (CEO)
- Products: Custom products
- Parent: PlanetArt

CafePress.com
- Website type: Online shopping
- Available in: English language
- Owners: CafePress, Inc.
- Registration: Required to buy and sell
- Launched: 1999; 27 years ago

CafePress, Inc. is an American online retailer of a wide range of consumer items, including clothing, home decor, drinkware, stationery, gifts, and user-customized on-demand items. The company was founded in San Mateo, California, but is now headquartered in Louisville, Kentucky, where its production facility is also located. In 2001, CafePress.com won the People's Voice Webby Award in the Commerce category.

== Business model ==
Logo used until 2008.

CafePress.com sells T-shirts, bags, mugs, wall clocks, calendars, and a myriad of other products. Customers can upload their own graphics design, logo, or text, which will be added to the product by the company. CafePress.com also offers print-on-demand services for wall art and stationery. The site also allows users to have a virtual CafePress "shop", including an online storefront and website hosting, order management, fulfillment, payment processing, and customer service.

== History ==
CafePress, Inc. was founded as a privately owned company in 1999 by Fred Durham and Mahesh Jain.

In July 2008, CafePress acquired the specialist photographic art printing business Imagekind, and in September 2010 further acquired photo-to-canvas company Canvas On Demand to add to their family of brands.

In June 2011, CafePress filed with the SEC to raise up to $80 million in an initial public offering.

On March 29, 2012, CafePress debuted at $19/share on the NASDAQ under the ticker symbol PRSS. The stock hit an intraday high of $22.69/share.

On April 30, 2012, CafePress announced that it would move its corporate headquarters from San Mateo, California, to its production facilities in Louisville, Kentucky, at a cost of $16.5 million. Louisville and the state of Kentucky had offered incentives as high as $10 million for the move, up to $1 million per year for ten years.

On September 28, 2018, Snapfish agreed to acquire CafePress for approximately $25 million, purchasing all outstanding CafePress stock for $1.48 per share in cash. The buyout was completed in November of that year. Company founder Fred Durham left the company when the buyout was complete.

In February 2019, CafePress suffered a data breach. The exposed data included 23 million unique email addresses, with some records also containing names, physical addresses, phone numbers, and security question/answer pairs. Over 180,000 records contained Social Security numbers. A 2022 FTC complaint alleged that CafePress was negligent in its security practices and failed to promptly notify customers after it became aware of this breach, and instead waited until security researchers disclosed it publicly. CafePress was ordered to pay US$500,000 after the 2019 data breach. The Federal Trade Commission announced the settlement and along with payment to those affected, must report its security measures to a third party.

On September 1, 2020, PlanetArt acquired CafePress from Shutterfly's business unit, Snapfish, a San Francisco–based company. Part of this transaction included CafePress changing its name to Residual Pumpkin Entity, but it still operates CafePress branded websites as such.

As of October 2024, the Federal Trade Commission (FTC) has initiated payments totaling over $370,000 to consumers adversely affected by the data security lapses of CafePress.

== Brands ==
CafePress, Inc. has its flagship brand, CafePress.com. CafePress, Inc. also partners with other businesses to provide licensed content on their site, and power online custom shops for large companies, such as ABC, Urban Outfitters and Peanuts Worldwide.
