= Anjali Sud =

American businesswoman (born 1983)

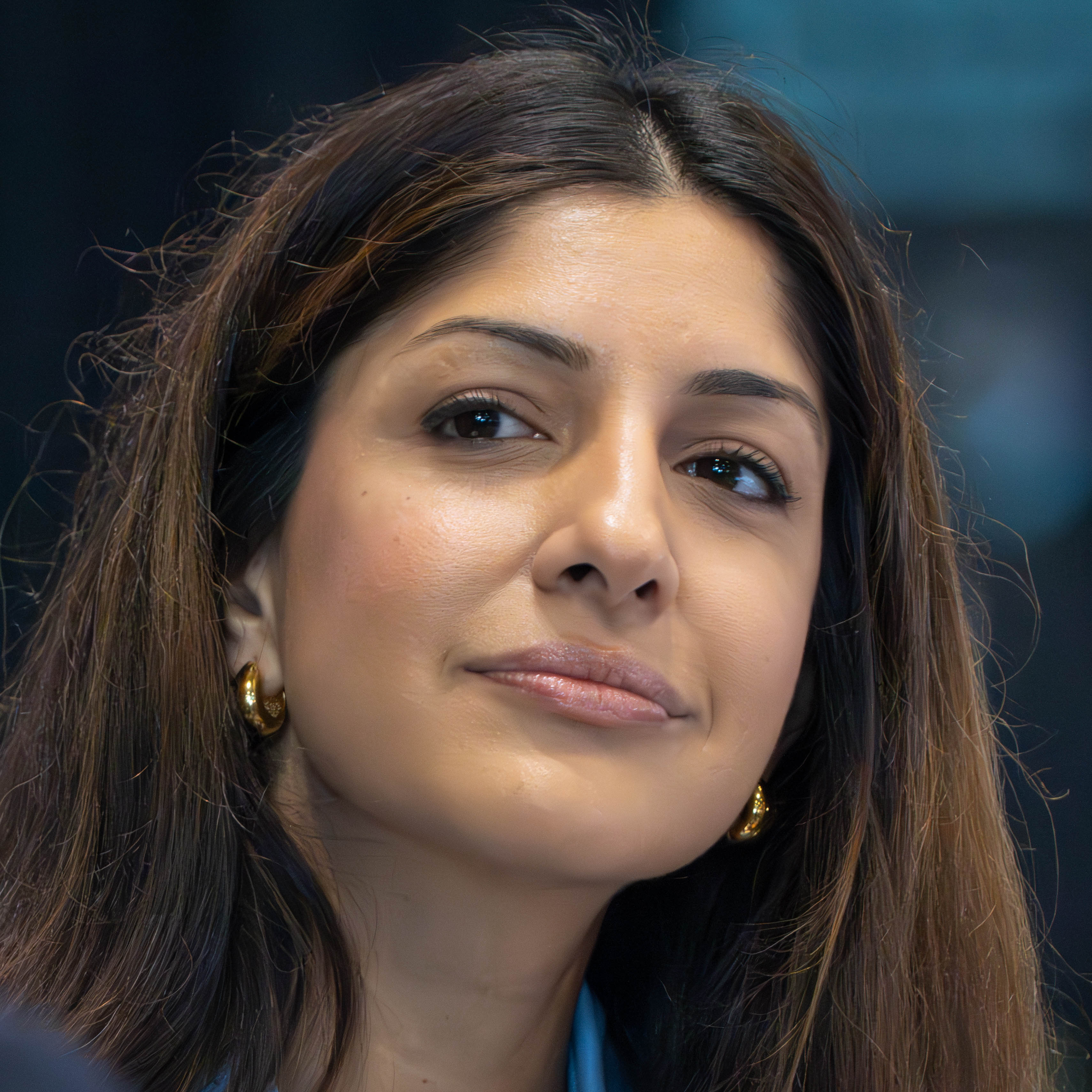
- Sud in 2024
- Born: August 13, 1983 (age 43); Detroit, Michigan, U.S.
- Education: Phillips Andover Academy; University of Pennsylvania; Harvard Business School
- Occupations: CEO of Tubi; Former CEO of Vimeo
- Children: 2

Anjali Sud (born August 13, 1983) is an American businesswoman and technology and media executive. She is the CEO of Tubi, the free entertainment streaming service owned by Fox Corporation. Sud was previously CEO of Vimeo for six years, until August 2023. She was appointed to the position in July 2017 and took the company public in May 2021. Sud sits on the boards of SiriusXM, Dolby Laboratories and Change.org, is a designated Young Global Leader of the World Economic Forum, and was listed as one of Fortune's 40 Under 40 rising business leaders in 2018.

== Early life ==
Sud was born in Detroit, Michigan, the daughter of Punjabi immigrants from India. She grew up in Flint, Michigan. In 1997, at age 14, Sud left Flint to study at Phillips Andover Academy, a selective private school in Andover, Massachusetts, that she learned about at a local bookstore after her public school lost accreditation. Initially, Sud struggled in the new academic environment.

Sud graduated from the University of Pennsylvania in 2005 with a B.Sc. in Finance and Management. During her senior year, she was rejected from every investment banking job that she applied for. In 2011, she received her MBA from Harvard Business School.

== Career ==
=== Vimeo ===
Between 2005 and 2014, Sud held positions in finance, media and e-commerce at Sagent Advisors, Time Warner and Amazon.

In 2014, Sud joined Vimeo, an IAC subsidiary, as Head of Global Marketing. She later served as General Manager of Vimeo's core creator business, where she built out the company's offering for hosting, distributing and monetizing videos. In that role, she led a number of launches on the platform, including Vimeo Business (a membership plan for marketers and brands), 360 video support, and video collaboration and review tools.

Sud was appointed to CEO of Vimeo in July 2017, as the company announced its plans to refocus its strategy from investing in original content to offering software and tools for video creators. In September 2017, she oversaw the acquisition of Livestream. In April 2019, she oversaw the acquisition of video editing app Magisto. In November 2021, she oversaw the acquisitions of video software startups WIREWAX and Wibbitz.

In November 2020, Vimeo raised $150 million in equity from Thrive Capital and GIC at a valuation of $2.75 billion. In January 2021, Vimeo raised $300 million in equity from T. Rowe Price and Oberndorf Enterprises at a valuation of over $5 billion. In May 2021, IAC completed a spinoff of Vimeo into an independent publicly traded company on Nasdaq (ticker: VMEO).

=== Tubi ===
After Sud's nine years at Vimeo and six years as CEO, on July 5, 2023, Vimeo announced that she would be departing the company in September 2023 to pursue another opportunity. Sud announced on July 17, 2023 that she would be joining the free streaming service Tubi as its new CEO, replacing founder Farhad Massoudi.

In June 2025, Tubi announced that it had crossed 100 million monthly active users, over $1 billion in annual revenue and an all-time high share of television viewing in the U.S. In 2026, Tubi was named the #15 most innovative company in the world and the #1 most innovative in video by Fast Company and a Time 100 company. In August 2026, Tubi announced that it had achieved record viewership and engagement with over 13 billion of hours streamed a year and its fourth consecutive quarter of profitability.

Sud sits on the board of SiriusXM, Dolby Laboratories and is chair of the board of Change.org. She is a designated Young Global Leader of the World Economic Forum and a Henry Crown Fellow at the Aspen Institute. In May 2025, Sud was elected to serve on Harvard University’s Board of Overseers, filling a vacancy left by recently elected Canadian Prime Minister Mark Carney.

=== SiriusXM ===
In November 2026, SiriusXM announced that it had hired Sud as its next CEO.

== Awards and honors ==
In November 2017, Sud was listed as one of The Hollywood Reporter's Next Gen: 35 Under 35 honorees.

In March 2018, Crain's New York selected Sud as one of its annual 40 Under 40 honorees.

In July 2018, Sud was named #14 on Fortune's "2018 40 Under 40" list. She was included on Adweek's Power List later that month.

In December 2019, Sud was honored with a Muse Award by the New York Women in Film & Television, along with Gloria Estefan and Ann Dowd.

In December 2021, Sud was named by Business Today as one of the most powerful women in business.

In September 2022, Sud was named by Fortune as one of India's most powerful business women.

In March 2023, Sud was named a Henry Crown Fellow at The Aspen Institute.

In December 2024, The Hollywood Reporter named Sud as one of the Most Powerful Women in Entertainment.

In February 2025, Sud was named as a CNBC Changemaker.

In May 2025, Pace University bestowed an honorary Doctorate of Science degree on Sud during its commencement ceremony for the Seidenberg School of Computer Science.
