= Guiye Frayo =

British-Argentine indie music duo

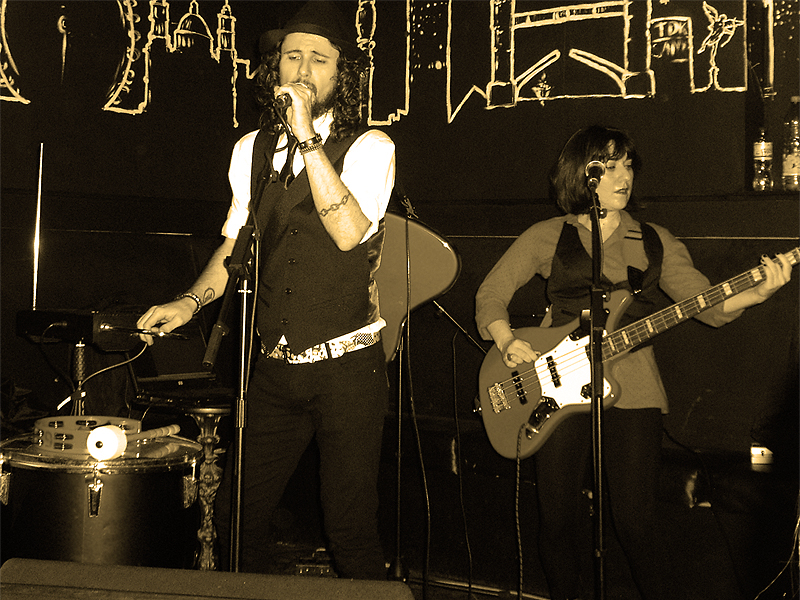
- Live performance, London 2009

Background information
- Origin: London, England
- Genres: Indie Pop, Indie Rock
- Years active: 2005–present
- Label: G.A.M.I Records
- Members: Guillermo Martinez Ipucha; Veronica Santillo
- Past members: Jordan Swain
- Website: www.guiyefrayo.com

Guiye Frayo is a London-based Argentine indie duo consisting of members Guillermo Martinez Ipucha and Veronica Santillo. Their music has elements of different styles, combining pop, rock, psychedelic, electronica, dance, and experimental to create a unique sound. They not only play conventional instruments (guitars, keyboards, and drums) but also the theremin, circuit-bent toys, and vintage synthesizers, among others. So far, they have released two albums, nine EPs, nine singles, and two video clips. They are currently working on new material.

== History ==
Guiye Frayo was originally a solo project by Guillermo. He had met Veronica in a previous band in which they played together, and Guillermo decided to turn his soloist project into a band in 2007. After relocating to London, they met Jordan, who joined them on drums during 2010, when they recorded "A Magnetic Field Called love"

In 2006 they won the Argentine bands/soloists contest "Vale por un video Clip" for the song "Arcoiris en un ojo", organized by FM La Tribu, Buenos Aires, Argentina. The judges were Tom Lupo (Argentine radio host, poet and psychologist), Guillermo pintos (Rolling Stone Argentina magazine at the time) and MTV Latin America VJ and Ruth Infarinato; the prize was the filming of a videoclip to the winning song. The video clip was made by Cine Humus, and won Best Video Clip at "Festival de Audiovisuales de La Plata"

English actress Emma Kennedy once suggested "Autumn Freaks" as song of the day in her blog.

They performed a live session at Balcony TV- London in August 2009 where they played an unusual toy based set up.

In 2010 "Portrait", "The Walk" and "Funky Monkey" were broadcast on Japan radio Takaoka

The band was introduced by Tom Robinson on BBC Radio 6 (BBC Introducing) several times, for the first time in 2008 with the song "Vida Minima", then in 2010 with "The Walk", again in 2011 Tom Robinson officially presented "A Magnetic Field Called Love" single release, the video clip to the song was launched the same week. Finally in 2014 their song "You and Me" was played on (BBC Introducing).

In 2015 the song "The Way I Like You" from their EP TWILY was featured in the popular video editing app Magisto.

== Awards ==
Year	Ceremony	Nominated work	Award	Result	Ref.
2008	FAV 5th Edition	Arcoiris en un ojo	Best Rock/Pop Videoclip	Nominated	
2008	FESAALP - 3rd Edition	Arcoiris en un ojo	Best Short-Film/Videoclip	Won	
2007	Best of Spellbound 2007 Awards	Juguetes & Canciones	Best Rock Performance	Nominated	
2006	Best of Spellbound 2006 Awards	Autumn Freaks	Best Electronic Performance	Nominated	
2006	Vale por un Video Clip	Arcoiris en un ojo	Best Soloist/Band Rock/Pop	Won	
2005	Best of Spellbound 2005 Awards	Sex in the house	Best Of Spellbound	Honorable Mention	

== Discography ==
=== Albums ===
- Happily Made - 26 April 2019
- Endless Fun - 1 February 2019

=== EPs ===
- 7 - 15 June 2015
- Electrified Brains - 29 September 2014
- Picnic in the Clouds - 28 July 2014
- Wordless - 23 September 2013
- Twily - 8 April 2013
- Psychedelic outer space dance - 22 March 2010
- London Ghosts Instrumental versions - 30 November 2009
- Computer in the shower (aka La Computadora en la Ducha) - 20 July 2009
- London Ghosts - 24 March 2009

=== Singles ===
- Once And Again (2020 Remaster) - 2020
- In Time (2019 Remaster) - 2019
- Electric Boundaries - 25 February 2014
- You and Me - 17 February 2014
- Canyon Winds - 19 August 2013
- Toxic Fields - 12 August 2013
- It's Good to Know - 5 August 2013
- A Bridge to Your Heart - 21 June 2013
- Funky Monkey Lunar - 18 November 2011
- Hey Honey Money! - 11 November 2011
- A Magnetic Field Called Love - 7 February 2011

== Collaborations ==
- 2007: Guillermo joined Greek band "The Fifth Galaxy Orchestra" crew and participated in the recording of their album "Music Through The Years" released in 2008 by Sunset Rouge Music playing Theremin in the song "2000 Feet Over Paris".
- 2007: Guillermo was invited to play Theremin at the launch of "Tropico" Spring Summer 08 Collection by Martin Churba (one of Argentina's most talented and well-known designers) with DJ Vivi Pedraglio.
- 2005 : Guillermo was invited by Hilda Lizarazu (rock-pop Argentine singer-songwriter) to play Theremin in 2 of a series of 4 shows called “Elegante Sport “ at Club del Vino in Buenos Aires, Argentina.
- 2005 : Guillermo was invited by Eterno Ahora (rock-pop Argentine band) to play Theremin in the presentation of Anima at the Teatro Municipal de Bahía Blanca, Argentina.
