= America's Next Top Cryptid =

Adult animated television series

- Genre: Adult animation; Comedy; Science fiction; Satire
- Created by: Rob DenBleyker; Kris Wilson
- Written by: Kris Wilson; Rob DenBleyker
- Story by: Rob DenBleyker; Kris Wilson; Adam Nushrallah; Connor Murphy; Chase Suddarth
- Directed by: Kris Wilson
- Voices of: Zachary Prescott; Joshua Tomar; Monica Rial; Geoff Galneda; Jessica Calvello; Chase Suddarth; Brandon Rogers; Laila Berzins
- Countries of origin: United States; United Kingdom
- Original language: English
- No. of seasons: 1
- No. of episodes: 8

Production
- Executive producers: Kris Wilson; Rob DenBleyker; John Fitzpatrick; Dave McElfatrick; Evan Weiss
- Producer: Adam Nushrallah
- Running time: 11–12 minutes
- Production companies: Explosm Entertainment; Spud Gun Studios; Animation+ Studios

Original release
- Network: Tubi
- Release: October 14, 2026

America's Next Top Cryptid is an adult animated television series created by Rob DenBleyker and Kris Wilson.

== Synopsis ==
In a government-sanctioned conspiracy, seven cryptids are put together for observation under the guise of competing in the reality television show America’s Next Top Cryptid.

== Episodes ==
No.	Title	Original release date
1	"Season 2"	October 14, 2026
2	"Dude, Where's My Stuff"	October 14, 2026
3	"Lights Out"	October 14, 2026
4	"Prank War"	October 14, 2026
5	"Pool Party"	October 14, 2026
6	"Talent Show"	October 14, 2026
7	"A Plan Inaction"	October 14, 2026
8	"The Big Escape"	October 14, 2026

== Release ==
America's Next Top Cryptid was premiered on Tubi on October 14, 2026.

== Reception ==
Anton Vellon of BubbleBlabber give 5/10 wrote "Similarly, the usual rapid-fire mood changes in Explosm’s other, drastically shorter titles don’t seem to work as well with each episode’s 11-minute runtime. Aside from exactly three meta-jokes on opposite ends of the show, there’s not much comedy that can get you to even crack a faint smirk".
