= Vimeo =

American video hosting platform

Vimeo, Inc.
- Trade name: Vimeo
- Type: Subsidiary
- Traded as: Nasdaq: VMEO; (2021–2025)
- Founded: November 14, 2004; 22 years ago
- Founder: Jake Lodwick (co-founder); Zach Klein (co-founder); Josh Abramson (partner); Ricky Van Veen (partner)
- Headquarters: New York City, U.S.
- Area served: Worldwide (except China, Indonesia, North Korea, Russia, Syria and Turkey)
- Key people: Philip Moyer (CEO)
- Products: Vimeo OTT; Vimeo Livestream; Vimeo Stock; Vimeo Enterprise; Vimeo Create; Vimeo Record
- Revenue: US$417 million (2024)
- Operating income: ▲US$19 million (2024)
- Net income: ▲US$27 million (2024)
- Total assets: ▲US$643 million (2024)
- Total equity: ▲US$409 million (2024)
- Number of employees: 1,102 (December 2024)
- Parent: IAC (2006–2021); Bending Spoons (2025–present)
- Subsidiaries: VHX; Vimeo Livestream; Magisto
- Vimeo.com
- Website type: Video hosting service, Software as a service
- Available in: 7 languages: English, Spanish, German, French, Japanese, Portuguese, Korean
- Advertising: No
- Registration: Optional
- Users: 300 million (2023)
- Launched: December 15, 2004; 21 years ago
- Current status: Active
- Website: vimeo.com

Vimeo (/ˈvɪmioʊ/ VIM-ee-oh) is an American video hosting, sharing, and services provider founded in 2004 and headquartered in New York City. Vimeo focuses on the delivery of high-definition video across a range of devices and operates on a software as a service (SaaS) business model. (Note: Vimeo ended support for Smart TV streaming however, in 2023.) The platform provides tools for video creation, editing, and broadcasting along with enterprise software solutions and the means for video professionals to connect with clients and other professionals. As of December 2021, the site had 260 million users, with around 1.6 million subscribers to its services.

The site was initially built by Jake Lodwick and Zach Klein in 2004 as a skunkworks project of CollegeHumor, taking inspiration from the photo sharing site Flickr launched earlier that year by Ludicorp. The project was organized as a division of CollegeHumor's parent, Connected Ventures, a startup formed by Ricky Van Veen, Josh Abramson, Lodwick and Klein. IAC acquired a 51% controlling stake in Connected Ventures in August 2006 for US$21 million. Following the acquisition of YouTube by Google less than three months later for over US$1.65 billion, IAC directed more effort into Vimeo. Lodwick and Klein both departed by 2008 and IAC implemented a more corporate-focused structure to build out Vimeo's services. In May 2021, Vimeo became a standalone public company. However, in September 2025, Bending Spoons announced a $1.38 billion all-cash deal to take Vimeo private, which finalized in November.

== History ==
=== Initial growth from CollegeHumor (2004–2009) ===
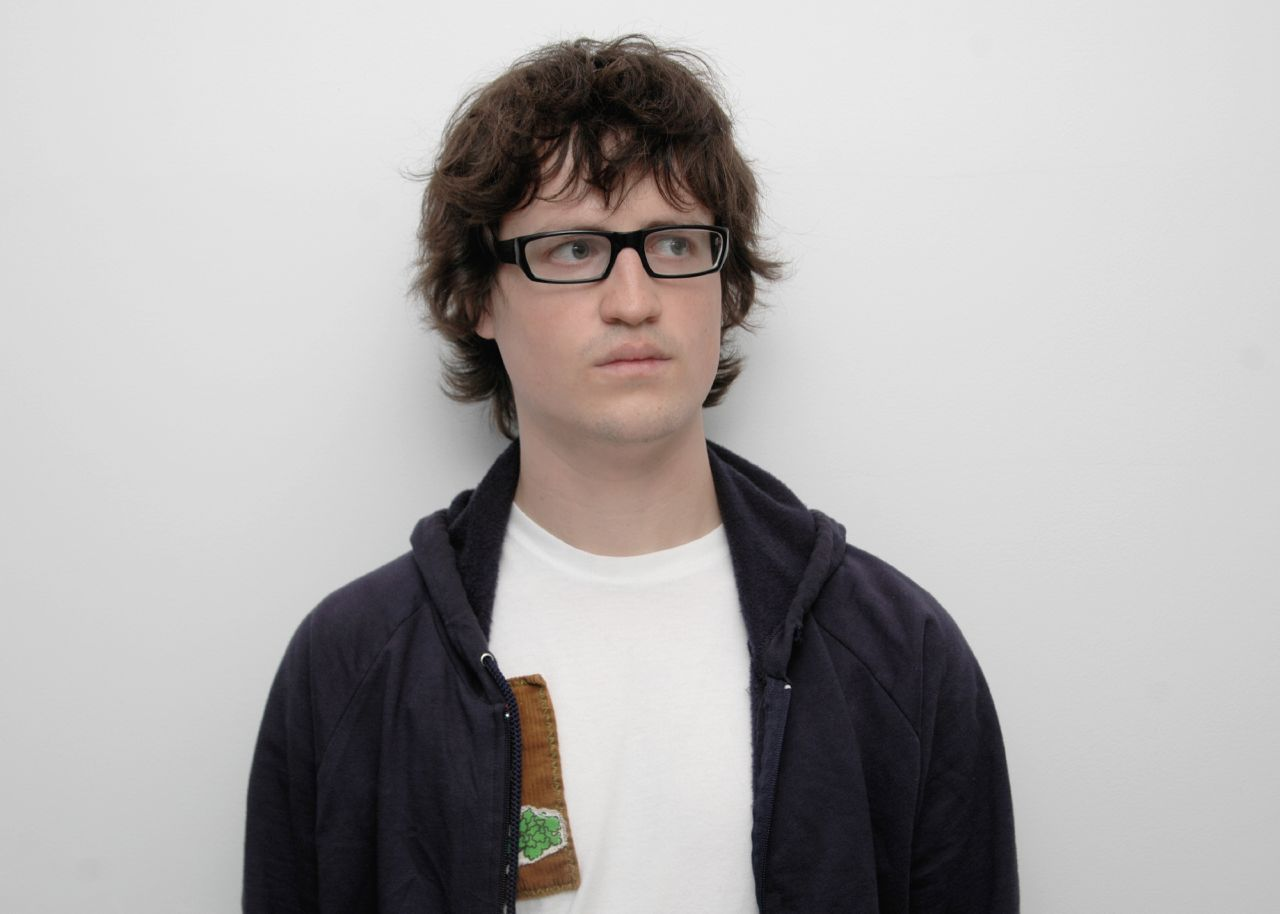
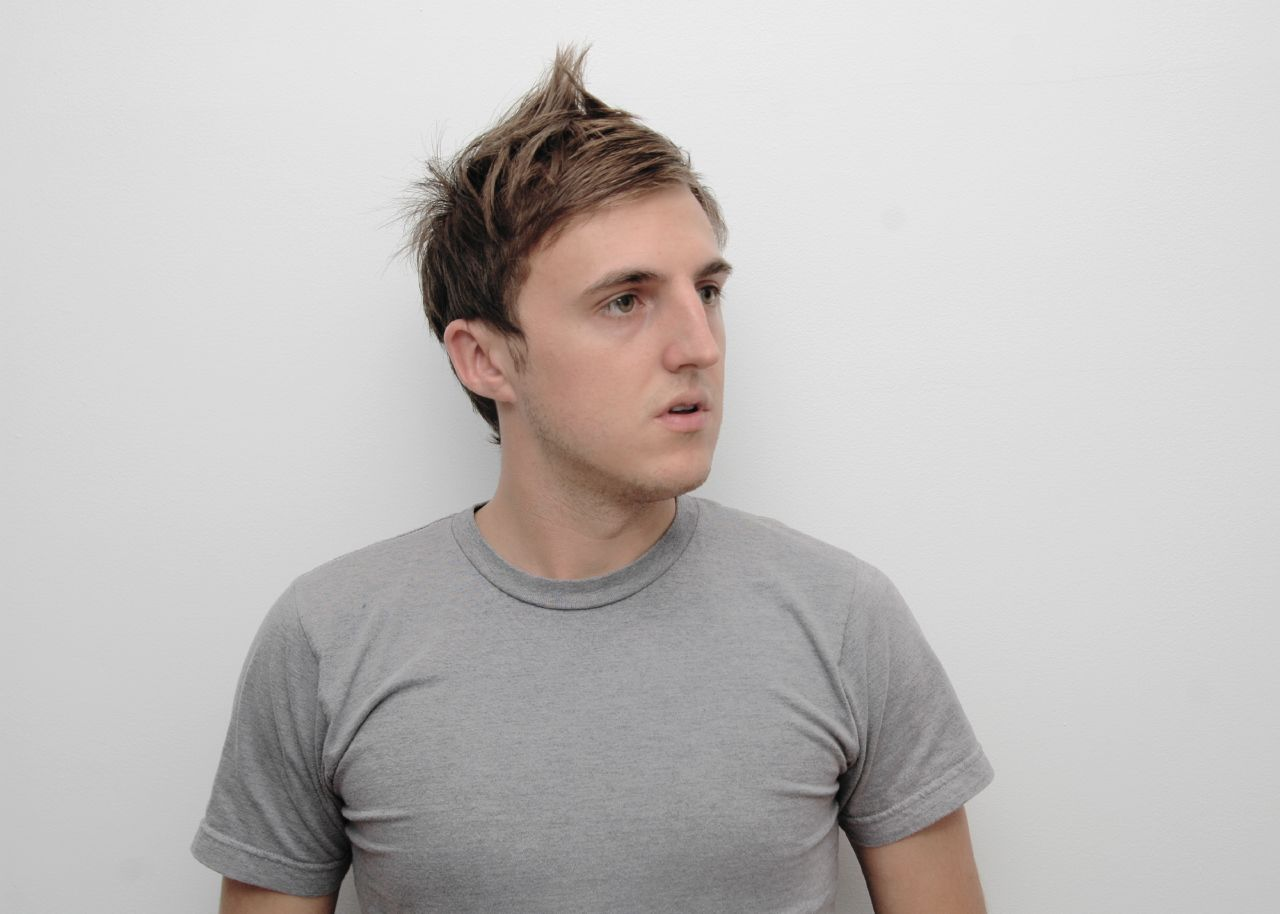
Jake Lodwick and Zach Klein, founders of Vimeo

Vimeo was built throughout fall 2004 by Connected Ventures, the parent company of the humor-based website CollegeHumor, as a side project of web developers Jake Lodwick and Zach Klein to share and tag short videos with their friends, and publicly launched on December 15. The idea for a video-sharing site was inspired after CollegeHumor received a large number of views from a posted video clip of the October 2004 Saturday Night Live show that included Ashlee Simpson's infamous lip-syncing incident. The name Vimeo was created by Lodwick as portmanteau of the words video and me, an anagram of movie, and a play on the word mimeo. Accounts required to upload were manually created during an invite-only beta, though the site added a feature allowing users to register accounts themselves beginning a few months later, June 18, 2005. As CollegeHumor was drawing in audiences, Vimeo was put to the side while Lodwick and Klein focused on supporting the main CollegeHumor site. Vimeo's user base grew only by a small amount during the next few years principally by word-of-mouth.

IAC/InterActiveCorp, owned by Barry Diller, acquired a 51% stake and voting control of Connected Ventures in August 2006 for US$21 million, as they were drawn by the success of CollegeHumor which was bringing around 6 million visitors a month at the time. In reviewing the assets of Connected Ventures, IAC discovered the Vimeo property; this came at the same time that Google had purchased YouTube for US$1.65 billion in October 2006. By the start of 2007, IAC had directed Lodwick, Klein, and Andrew Pile to work on Vimeo full time and expand its capabilities. To differentiate themselves from YouTube and other video sharing sites that had appeared since Google's purchase, Vimeo was focused on the content creator with better upload tools, and better curation of content on the site rather than on popularity. By October 2007, Vimeo was the first video sharing site to offer high-definition content to users via Flash-based high-definition video playback. While IAC's acquisition of Connected Ventures helped to target Vimeo's direction, the corporate nature of IAC created issues with many of the original staff of CollegeHumor and Vimeo. Lodwick was planning to leave the company near the end of 2007, as he said that IAC's incorporation of business processes hampered their creativity, but was fired a few weeks before that point. Klein left the company in early 2008.

=== Developing high-definition content delivery (2009–2017) ===
Vimeo began rolling out a major redesign of its site in 2009 aimed to put the user's focus on the video, which ultimately was completed by January 2012. The new version was aimed to feature the video playback as the central focus of the design, contrasting with the numerous user interface elements that YouTube had within its layout at the time.

Art of the Title, the online publication dedicated to title sequence design, uploaded its first video to Vimeo on January 3, 2012.

From 2008 to 2014, Vimeo had blocked the hosting of video game-related videos as they typically were longer than their normal content and took much of the site's resources. Vimeo did allow machinima videos with a narrative structure. The ban was lifted by October 2014.

In December 2014, Vimeo introduced 4K support, though it would only allow downloading due to the low market penetration of 4K displays at the time. Streaming of 4K content launched the following year, along with adaptive bitrate streaming support. In March 2017, Vimeo introduced 360-degree video support, including support for virtual reality platforms and smartphones, stereoscopic video, and an online video series providing guidance on filming and producing 360-degree videos.

Support for high-dynamic-range video up to 8k was added in 2017, and AV1 encoding in June 2019.

=== Transition to a software provider (2016–2019) ===
Vimeo acquired VHX, a platform for premium over-the-top subscription video channels, in May 2016, subsequently offering this as a service to its sites customers. Vimeo acquired the existing service Livestream in September 2017 to bolster its associated staff and technology, eventually integrated its streaming technology as Vimeo Live, another service offering for its service subscribers as Vimeo OTT.

Around 2016, Vimeo had expressed its intentions to enter into the subscription video-on-demand market with its own original programming, with the intent of spending "tens of millions" on content to populate the service as to compete with services like Netflix. According to IAC CEO Joey Levin, some of the original programming would have been from content creators already on Vimeo, paid for their material to be used on the service, thus reducing their own costs in producing content in comparison to Netflix. However, by June 2017, Vimeo had scrapped this plan, recognizing that not only that they were far behind Netflix and others in this area but that they also had generally had far fewer potential viewers and that their ultimate goal, converting those viewers into customers of the site, would be difficult. To support this change of approach, Vimeo named Anjali Sud, a general manager and senior vice president who joined Vimeo in 2014, as its new CEO in July 2017. Sud knew they did not have the financial resources to compete with Netflix in terms of creating original content.

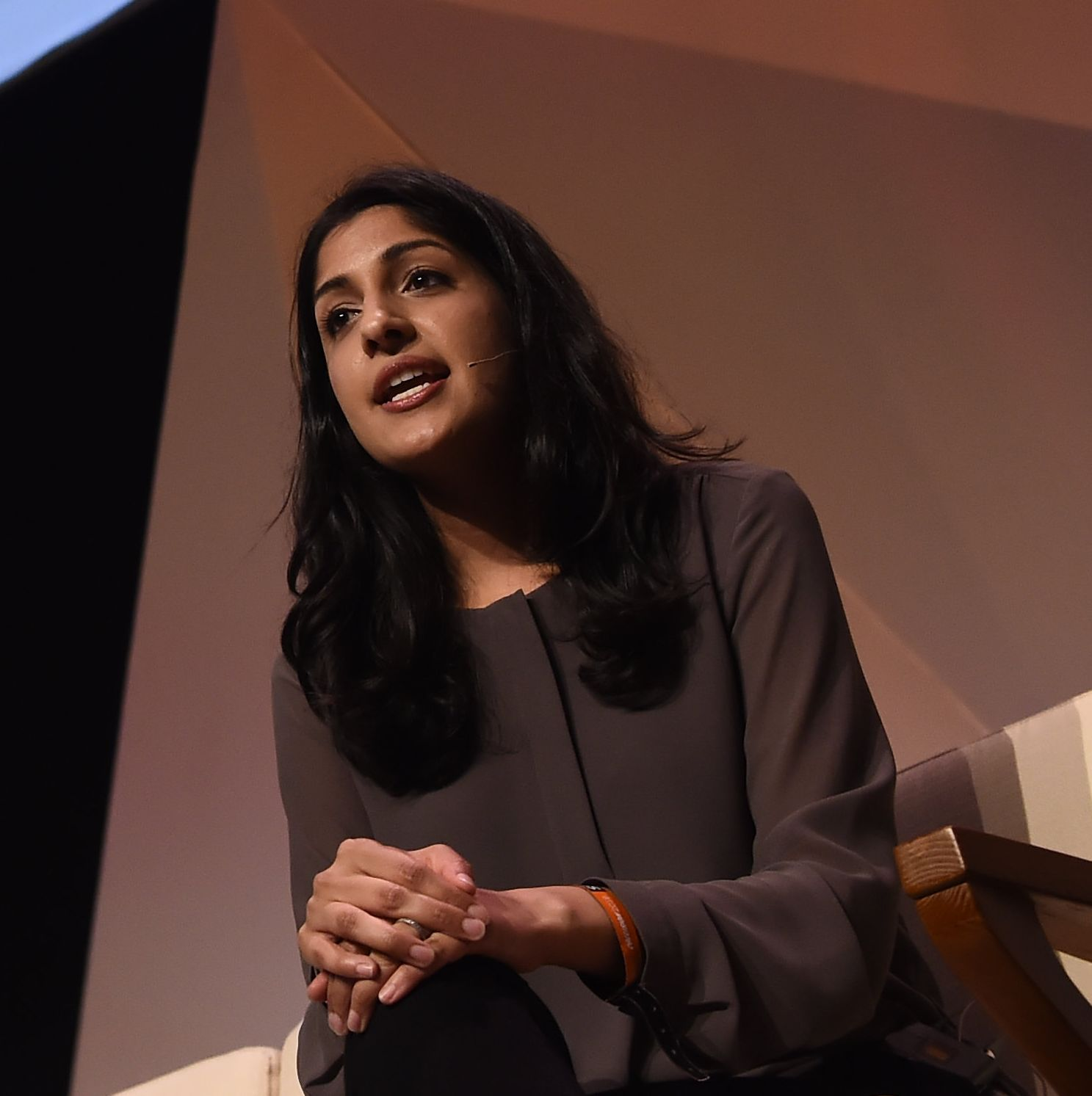
Anjali Sud, former CEO of Vimeo

On this move, Vimeo decided to focus more heavily on supporting its content creators and customers, transitioning itself away from being simply a content-hosting or video-sharing website and move into the software as a service model. According to Sud, Vimeo saw that the demand for online video services had shifted away from Hollywood productions and media producers and was gaining more traction by large businesses, and just as Vimeo had originally drawn attention from indie filmmakers at its start, they saw an opportunity to help with smaller businesses needed video sharing capabilities but lacking the resources to develop those internally. The company introduced a number of tiers and services aimed for business use atop their existing services. Vimeo no longer considered itself a competitor to YouTube or other video-sharing sites, and instead called itself "the Switzerland for creators", according to Sud. Creators were allowed to copy and share their videos to any other video-sharing site as long as they continued to use Vimeo's video editing tools for preparing their creations. In early 2017, Vimeo released collaborative review tools for its users, allowing them to privately share to other users to get feedback tied to individual frames of the video, thus keeping the video creation workflow entirely within the Vimeo service.

Vimeo acquired Magisto, an artificial intelligence (AI)-backed video creation service with over 100 million users, in April 2019. While the deal's terms were not disclosed, the purchase was reportedly valued at $200 million. Through the acquisition, Magisto's staff were brought into Vimeo, and their existing userbase gained access to Vimeo's toolset. For Vimeo, they saw Magisto's technology helpful for smaller businesses that may not have the funds or skills to product professional videos and could be aided by Magisto's technology. By February 2020, Vimeo launched Vimeo Create, the integration of Magisto's tools into the Vimeo platform to let its users easy create videos guided by AI agents from stock video footage offered by Vimeo and the users' own sources.

=== Transition to a standalone public company (2020–2025) ===
In November 2020, spurred by growth in Vimeo's services due to the COVID-19 pandemic, IAC raised US$150 million for Vimeo in anticipation of spinning off the subsidiary as its own company, giving Vimeo a US$2.75 billion valuation. IAC formally announced plans to spin off Vimeo as a public-owned company in December 2020, with the process expected to close by the second quarter of 2021. Vimeo would become the 11th company spun-out from IAC following this.

Another round of investment in January 2021 brought an additional US$300 million, raising its total valuation to an estimated US$5 billion. Vimeo's shareholders agreed to going public on May 14, 2021. The company was fully spun out as its own entity on May 25, 2021, and started trading on Nasdaq under the ticker symbol VMEO.

In November 2021, Vimeo acquired Wirewax, a suite of interactive video tools, and Wibbitz, an AI-based video creation platform. Vimeo demonstrated the incorporation of Wirewax's interactive tools through a new monthly "Video Matters" video series showing the best videos on the platform. That same November, the company also brought Vimeo Events which allowed users to schedule webinar-type experiences alongside other video content.

In March 2022, Vimeo announced that it would begin limiting bandwidth to all users to 2 terabytes per month, a rate they estimate would affect only 1% of all its users. Just prior to this change, users of Vimeo had reported they had been approached to purchase higher tier accounts, but Vimeo apologized for this approach, and felt it was better to set the flat bandwidth rate. Going over this rate would not affect any videos the user had on the service, and they would work with users to offer tiered options or to help transition off Vimeo to other services if that was their choice. In 2020 Vimeo also launched video chapters.

In January 2023, Vimeo laid off 11% of its employees. On 27 June 2023, Vimeo ended support for its smart TV apps on Apple TV, Android TV, Fire TV, and Roku TV. Vimeo encourages Android and iOS viewers to cast the Vimeo app to a smart TV instead. Paid Vimeo subscribers with an eligible plan can continue to create and update custom-branded Fire TV and Roku TV apps.

Vimeo added a new suite of AI powered tools to its software in June 2023, including an AI script generator, on-camera teleprompter, and an editing option to automatically remove pauses and filler-words.

=== Acquisition by Bending Spoons (2025–present) ===
In September 2025, Vimeo announced that it had agreed to be acquired by Bending Spoons, a Milan-based mobile app developer, in an all-cash transaction valued at approximately $1.38 billion. The deal closed in November 2025, following regulatory approvals after a unanimous vote by the board of directors. The listing of common stock was suspended from Nasdaq before the opening of trading on November 24, 2025. Vimeo continues to operate under its existing brand following the transaction.

On January 20, 2026, Vimeo laid off the majority of their staff.

== Corporate affairs ==
=== Leadership ===
After the departures of Lodwick and Klein, IAC brought in a more corporate structure to the company. By January 2009, Dae Mellencamp joined IAC as general manager of Vimeo. She was CEO until March 19, 2012, when Kerry Trainor joined Vimeo as CEO.

Around 2016, several high-level executives announced their departure from Vimeo, including Trainor. IAC's CEO Joey Levin was named as interim CEO for Vimeo during its search for a new CEO. After a year-long search, IAC promoted then general manager Anjali Sud as the CEO.

In August 2023, Anjali Sud stepped down from the role. Adam Gross was appointed the interim CEO. Philip Moyer, a former executive with Google Cloud, was named the new CEO in April 2024.

=== Product offerings and revenue structure ===
In contrast with other video-sharing sites, Vimeo does not use any advertising either on its pages or embedded in videos. Instead, Vimeo sells its services and products to content creators for revenue as a software as a service (SaaS) model. The site offers a free tier of service. As of August 22, 2022, a free account is limited to two video uploads monthly and 25 total videos. Legacy free accounts have a weekly upload limit and, since 2018, a total storage limit. Paid subscriber tiers, first introduced in 2008, provide accounts with a larger upload allowance and greater storage capacity.

Starting around 2016, Vimeo has also shifted towards supporting businesses through its offerings. It introduced a Business tier plan to allow for intra-business collaboration as well as for businesses to host informational videos for their customers. With the acquisition of Livestream in 2017, Vimeo added another tier for Premium subscribers, offering unlimited uploads and streaming events through Vimeo Live. Vimeo launched Vimeo Enterprise, a set of tools designed for large organizations that allow users to manage and share live and on-demand video across workspaces, in August 2019. Vimeo established partnerships with Mailchimp, HubSpot, and Constant Contact marketing platforms to allow their clients to easily integrate Vimeo videos into mail and other promotional campaigns. Vimeo also partnered with TikTok to give TikTok commercial users access to Vimeo's editing tools for video content.

In addition to subscriptions, Vimeo has other revenue streams through additional services to its customers. Creators could sell access to individual videos since 2013, and later could offer subscription-based access in 2015, with Vimeo taking a 10% cut of the sales. Vimeo has offered a video on demand service since 2015, allowing its partners to sell Vimeo videos through their websites to their customers. Via its VHX acquisition, Vimeo offers an over-the-top media service (OTT), Vimeo OTT, which Vimeo subscribers can use to create custom mobile apps to provide on-demand video to the app's subscribers, with Vimeo handling the subscriptions, billing, and content delivery. In 2018, the site launched Vimeo Stock to allow content creators to offer videos as stock footage to be used by others. Vimeo Create was introduced in 2020 to allow users to create videos with the help of artificial intelligence.

To further promote Vimeo as a home for professional video support, Vimeo opened a "For Hire" job marketplace in September 2019, allowing companies seeking professional video services to freely post job requests for the site's users to browse and respond to. Vimeo Record was launched in October 2020 to allow businesses to use recorded video messaging within their company or with their clients to aid in communications.

=== Customer size ===
By December 2013, Vimeo had attracted more than 100 million unique visitors per month, and more than 22 million registered users. At this time, fifteen percent of Vimeo's traffic came from mobile devices. As of February 2013, Vimeo accounted for 0.11% of all Internet bandwidth, following far behind its larger competitors, video sharing sites YouTube and Facebook. The community of Vimeo includes indie filmmakers and their fans. The Vimeo community has adopted the name "Vimeans", which references active members of the Vimeo community who engage with other users on a regular basis.

In 2019, enterprise customers were Vimeo's fastest-growing segment in terms of revenue according to Glenn Schiffman, IAC's chief financial officer. CTO Mark Kornfilt said they had nearly one million subscribers as of April 2019, making up a majority of the firm's US$160 million annual revenue. This had grown to over 1.2 million by March 2020, and over US$200 million in annual revenue, The site had also obtained 175 million registered users by April 2020. and over 200 million by November 2020 attributed to increased use of Vimeo due to the COVID-19 pandemic.

Prior to going public, the company had about 1.6 million paying subscribers.

=== Events ===
Vimeo launched its Vimeo Festival and Awards program in 2010, and held subsequent events every eighteen months. The Festival allows video creators to submit their films for a small fee for consideration across multiple categories. Typically more than 5,000 videos are submitted, and these are narrowed to a field of 1,000 for select judge-panel to vote for winners across multiple categories. This culminates with a live awards presentation showing thewinning films in each category. Each category winner carries a cash prize and an overall best-in-show prize. Vimeo had established the Festival and Awards to help give video and filmmakers an opportunity to highlight their work on Vimeo's pages and gain potential work from clients.

In 2008, Vimeo launched its Staff Picks, highlighting videos in a special channel as picked by the company's employees as some of the best work by its users. This feature was expanded in 2016 to give special laurels to videos that the staff felt were "Best of the Month" and "Best of the Year", as well as adding Staff Pick Premiere for newly added videos to the Staff Picks channel. In 2020, Vimeo invited previous Staff Picks recipients to create videos about their favorite small business owners and the impact of the COVID-19 pandemic as part of its Stories in Place program.

== Impacts in other countries ==
Since January 9, 2014, Vimeo has been blocked in Turkey without clear reasons. Also in the same year, Indonesia blocked Vimeo because of the content that contains pornography and nudity. As of March 2021, Vimeo is blocked in China.

Starting May 4, 2012, the site was blocked in India by some ISPs under orders from the Department of Telecommunications, without any stated reasons. Vimeo was blocked in India in December 2014, due to fears that the website was spreading ISIS propaganda through some of its user-made videos. However, on December 31, the site was unblocked in India. In September 2025, to comply with Online Safety Act and EU Digital Service, Vimeo will use Age Verify for users in UK and EU to access to Vimeo.

== Legal cases ==
In January 2019, the Commercial Court of Rome determined that Vimeo's video-hosting platform played an "active role" in copyright infringement and the posting of Italian television programs owned by media conglomerate Mediaset. After Vimeo declined to remove over 2,000 copyrighted videos at the request of Mediaset, the company was forced to pay $9,700,000 in penalties.

In 2009, Capitol Records/Universal Music Group sued Vimeo for copyright infringement based on user-uploaded videos, which Vimeo defended on the basis of the Digital Millennium Copyright Act (DMCA) safe harbor provisions under 17 U.S.C. § 512. Two rulings at the Southern District of New York in 2013 ruled primarily in favor of Vimeo, and the Second Circuit issued a Vimeo-favorable ruling in 2016. Back at the district court, Vimeo won another favorable ruling in May 2021.

In June 2019, California pastor James Domen, founder of the "ex-gay" ministry Church United, sued Vimeo after the website, in 2018, removed 89 of his videos for violating its content guidelines. The videos expressed opposition to homosexuality and advocated so-called "conversion therapy". A federal court dismissed Domen's suit in 2020, and the Second Circuit Court of Appeals affirmed the dismissal in 2021.

After its acquisition of Magisto, Vimeo was sued in September 2019 for violations of the state of Illinois's Biometric Information Privacy Act (BIPA). The class-action suit alleged that Vimeo, via Magisto's software, had automatically scanned and tracked specific individuals in the videos uploaded through the service, identifying their gender, age, and race, without prior consent as required by BIPA. Vimeo asserted that the technology only used machine learning to identify areas in videos that equated to human faces, and that "Determining whether an area represents a human face or a volleyball does not equate to 'facial recognition'." Vimeo also affirmed that they, via Magisto, "neither collects nor retains any facial information capable of recognizing an individual". Vimeo lost a bid to force arbitration in 2020, and settled in 2022.

== See also ==
- Comparison of video hosting services
- Dailymotion
