= Jake Lodwick =

American software engineer, serial entrepreneur and investor (born 1981)

- Lodwick in 2005
- Born: Jacob Lodwick; July 25, 1981 (age 45); Baltimore, Maryland, United States
- Education: Rochester Institute of Technology
- Occupations: Entrepreneur, software engineer, investor
- Known for: Co-founding Vimeo

Jacob Lodwick (born July 25, 1981) is an American software engineer, businessman and investor, best known as co-founder of Vimeo.

== Early life and education ==
Lodwick was born and raised in Baltimore, Maryland and attended college at the Rochester Institute of Technology. While attending the Rochester Institute of Technology, Lodwick would contribute to the arts and satire publication Gracies Dinnertime Theatre laying the groundwork for his interest in collegiate-based humor.

== Career ==
Lodwick was the initial web developer for CollegeHumor and the resulting Connected Ventures in 2004. When he was a part of the founding team at Connected Ventures, Lodwick co-created Vimeo and came up with the name, a portmanteau of video and me. In 2006 Vimeo was acquired by Barry Diller's IAC/Interactive Corp, and Lodwick was fired in late 2007.

After departing from Vimeo in 2007, Lodwick went on to create and be president of the Normative Music Company. In late 2009, Lodwick shut down the site, citing inexperience and lack of devotion.

Lodwick subsequently worked as an independent creative engineer, launching Pummelvision, software that assembles one's photos into stories with music. Pummelvision was inspired by a photo import feature which showed the current photo being imported.

In 2019, Lodwick was CEO of the software company Keezy.

In the years since Vimeo's sale to IAC, Lodwick has invested in other technology startups including Tumblr and Makerbot.
