= Tubi =

American streaming video service

- Logo used since February 28, 2024 (Note: The traditional logo is yellow. The purple variant is displayed due to background compatibility reasons.)
- Company type: Division
- Website type: OTT platform
- Available in: 34 languages (Note: The interface is available only in English, Spanish, and French. However, most of the selections are in English and Spanish (via Tubi en Español hub), with some content available in 29 other languages.)
- List of languages: Arabic; Chinese (Cantonese and Mandarin); Croatian; Czech; Danish; Dutch; English; Filipino (Tagalog); Finnish; French; German; Greek; Hebrew; Hindi; Hungarian; Indonesian; Italian; Japanese; Korean; Norwegian; Polish; Portuguese; Romanian; Russian; Slovak; Spanish; Swedish; Tamil; Telugu; Thai; Turkish; Ukrainian; Vietnamese
- Founded: April 1, 2014; 12 years ago, in San Francisco, California, U.S.
- Headquarters: 315 Montgomery St, 16th Floor, San Francisco, California, U.S.
- Area served: Australia; Canada; Costa Rica; Ecuador; El Salvador; Guatemala; Mexico; New Zealand; Panama; United Kingdom; United States
- Owners: Independent (2014–2020); Fox Corporation (2020–present)
- Founders: Farhad Massoudi; Thomas Ahn Hicks
- Key people: Anjali Sud (CEO)
- Industry: Entertainment
- Revenue: $700M (2023, estimated)
- Parent: Tubi Media Group
- Website: tubitv.com
- Registration: Optional
- Users: ▲110 million monthly active users (as of August 6, 2026)
- Launched: April 1, 2014; 12 years ago
- Current status: Active

Tubi (stylized as tubı) is an American over-the-top ad-supported streaming television service owned by Fox Corporation since 2020. The service was launched on April 1, 2014, and is based in San Francisco, California. In 2023, Tubi, Credible Labs, and other Fox digital assets were placed into a new division known as the Tubi Media Group.

In May 2024, Tubi was reported to have had 80 million monthly active users. In January 2025, they were reported to have had 97 million monthly active users, and reached 100 million monthly active users in June 2025. Tubi reached 110 million monthly active users in August 2026. The service was ranked 33rd in Fast Company's "The World's 50 Most Innovative Companies of 2025".

== History ==
Tubi logo used from 2017 to 2024

Tubi was founded by Farhad Massoudi and Thomas Ahn Hicks of AdRise, launching in 2014 as a free service under the name Tubi TV. In May 2017, they raised $20 million in a round of funding from Jump Capital, Danhua Capital, Cota Capital, and Foundation Capital. In June 2019, Tubi announced that it had over 20 million active monthly users, and later in September, the company reported that users had streamed 132 million hours of content. In September 2020, the company reported 33 million monthly users.

In 2019, Tubi announced it would nearly double its 2018 spending on licensed content, taking it close to $100 million. In February 2019, Tubi signed a distribution deal with NBCUniversal, which included episodes from 400 TV series and also several films.

Tubi became available on Vizio SmartCast on September 25, 2019. On October 21, Tubi launched Tubi Kids, a dedicated hub for the streamer's children-centric content via Roku and supported devices.

=== Sale to Fox ===
On March 17, 2020, Fox Corporation (which had recently been spun off from 21st Century Fox following that company's acquisition by Disney one year prior) announced that it would acquire Tubi for $440 million cash upfront, with the sale being completed on April 20; Massoudi would remain at the company, which would continue as a separate subsidiary.

In December 2021, Fox acquired MarVista Entertainment, in a move to bolster Tubi's library and leverage its production capabilities for made-for-TV films.

In December 2022, Tubi signed a content deal with South Korean entertainment company CJ ENM, licensing a number of Korean-language films, television series, and K-pop programs. (South Korean content is one of Tubi's fastest-growing categories.)

In January 2023, Tubi signed a content deal with Warner Bros. Discovery for 11 new FAST channels and adding on demand content from various Warner properties.

During Super Bowl LVII, Tubi aired the commercial Interface Interruption. The advertisement tricked its viewers into believing the game had restarted with announcers Kevin Burkhardt and Greg Olsen talking vaguely about the game, before making it appear as though someone had exited the game and changed to Tubi, choosing to watch the 2005 mystery film Mr. & Mrs. Smith. The advertisement, which was purposefully short to alleviate concerns, was met with mixed reactions with some acclaiming the commercial and others such as The Mary Sue and Wanda Sykes referring to it as dangerous.

In July 2023, Anjali Sud was announced as the new CEO of Tubi following the departure of Massoudi.

In December 2023, Tubi signed a new content deal with Warner Bros. Discovery to bring nine new FAST channels and added some of DC Comics shows and films only on demand.

In May 2024, Tubi sued the law firm Keller Postman for allegedly manufacturing tens of thousands of meritless discrimination claims against it in the hopes of coercing a settlement.

In February 2025, Tubi aired Super Bowl LIX. That same month, Fox Corporation announced it had acquired the podcast and media company, Red Seat Ventures. Red Seat Ventures would still operate as an independent company, but would be placed under Tubi's parent company, Tubi Media Group.

On March 4, 2025, Fox Sports Mexico announced that it had taken legal action against Fox Corporation (owner of Tubi) and Grupo Pachuca because the alleged right of preference for bidding to continue broadcasting the home matches of Club León and Pachuca in the Liga MX for Mexican territory had not been respected. However, both Fox Corporation and Grupo Pachuca subsequently responded, clarifying that Grupo Lauman (owner of Fox Sports Mexico) had not paid for the television rights of both clubs. In addition, Fox Corp. indicated that the permission that Grupo Lauman had to use the Fox brand had expired and therefore it would have to gradually withdraw it.

In October 2025, Tubi announced a partnership with Canadian media company Bell Media, in which it will handle Canadian advertising sales for the service, as well as co-develop new programming for the platform.

In November 2026, CEO Anjali Sud announced she was leaving the company to become CEO at SiriusXM.

== Investors and board members ==
Sandy Grushow, former Fox TV chair, is an advisory board member.

Mark Amin, former vice chair of Lionsgate, was an investor before the Fox acquisition.

As of 2014, Adrise, the company behind Tubi, has raised $4 million in capital. Principal investors include Foundation Capital, Bobby Yazdani, Zod Nazem, SGH Capital, and Streamlined Ventures.

== Global availability ==
In November 2015, AdRise partnered with Blue Ant Media to launch Tubi in Canada.

Tubi became inaccessible throughout the European Union as a result of the GDPR entering into force on May 25, 2018. It was later announced that Tubi would relaunch in the United Kingdom by early 2019. According to their website, they "hope to relaunch in the EU in the future". and is "working on compliance [with GDPR] and is planning to relaunch in European countries soon".

Tubi officially launched in Australia (Note: The launch also includes the external territories of Christmas Island, Cocos (Keeling) Islands, Heard Island and McDonald Islands and Norfolk Island.) and New Zealand (Note: The launch also includes the partially recognized states of Cook Islands and Niue and the dependent territory of Tokelau.) (Oceania) on September 1, 2019.

In January 2020, the platform announced an expansion to Mexico, in a partnership with TV Azteca, making it the first Latin American country to launch the service.

In July 2022, Tubi announced a partnership with Shaw Communications to make the service available to all of Shaw's customers, and further expanding Tubi's reach in Canada.

In August 2022, the service launched in Costa Rica, Ecuador, El Salvador, Guatemala and Panama.

In July 2024, Tubi relaunched in the United Kingdom. (Note: The relaunch also includes the Crown Dependencies of Guernsey, Isle of Man and Jersey and the Overseas Territories of Anguilla, Bermuda, British Indian Ocean Territory, British Virgin Islands, Cayman Islands, Falkland Islands, Gibraltar, Montserrat, Pitcairn Islands, Saint Helena, South Georgia and the South Sandwich Islands and Turks and Caicos Islands.)

== Programming ==
As of January 2023, Tubi's programming includes more than 40,000 films and television series from more than 250 providers (along American and foreign content) on approximately 200 channels.

Since its acquisition by Fox Corporation, Tubi also carries programming from Fox Entertainment, Fox Soul, local news from stations owned by Fox as well as affiliates of other major networks, and Fox Weather. The service began producing its own original content in 2021, including television films and series. Prior to the Fox acquisition, and still to this day, through the Español and Tubi Kids hubs respectively, the service also inherited former MundoFox game show Minuto para Ganar as well as several titles previously broadcast on Fox's former 4Kids TV block (such as Chaotic (only available in the Spanish-language section), Dinosaur King, G.I. Joe: Sigma 6, Sonic X, and several entries in the Yu-Gi-Oh! franchise).

Tubi uses a real-time bidding platform for advertisers that deliver video ads across various platforms.

The service has launched a number of special features for users based on their interests and viewing preferences: "Tubi Roulette" offers a random film to watch, while "Tubi Scenes" presents curated clips, helping users decide whether to continue watching the entire movie.

Beginning March 1, 2026, Tubi started adding content from Cartoon Network and Warner Bros. libraries.

=== Original programming ===
==== Drama ====
Title	Genre	Premiere	Seasons	Runtime	Status
The Nevers (season 1B) (Note: The first six episodes of season 1 originally aired on HBO.)	Science fiction drama	February 14, 2023	1 season, 6 episodes	54–64 min	Ended
Boarders (seasons 2–3) (Note: Co-production with BBC Three.)	Teen drama	April 17, 2025	2 seasons, 12 episodes	47–50 min	Ended
Bite Size Terror	Horror	October 2, 2026	1 season, 10 episodes	6–14 min	Pending

==== Comedy ====
Title	Genre	Premiere	Seasons	Runtime	Status
The Z-Suite	Workplace comedy	February 6, 2025	1 season, 8 episodes	24–27 min	Ended
Demascus	Science fiction comedy	August 7, 2025	1 season, 6 episodes	24–30 min	Miniseries
Safe Space	Comedy	November 7, 2025	2 season, 16 episodes	22–23 min	Renewed
Mo' Waffles	Comedy	December 19, 2025	1 season, 4 episodes	30–35 min	Pending
The Airport	Workplace comedy	November 19, 2026	1 season, 10 episodes	15–19 min	Pending

==== Animation ====
Title	Genre	Premiere	Seasons	Runtime	Status
The Freak Brothers	Adult animated comedy	November 14, 2021	3 seasons, 22 episodes	24–25 min	Pending
RoboForce: The Animated Series	Family animated action science fiction	April 12, 2025	1 season, 6 episodes	22–24 min	Ended
Toon World Express	Adult animated comedy clip show	June 3, 2026	1 season, 8 episodes	23–28 min	Pending
Breaking Bear	Adult animated comedy	July 24, 2026	1 season, 8 episodes	24–25 min	Pending
America's Next Top Cryptid	Adult animated science fiction comedy	October 14, 2026	1 season, 8 episodes	11–12 min	Pending

==== Unscripted ====
===== Docuseries =====
Title	Subject	Premiere	Seasons	Runtime	Status
Meet, Marry, Murder	True crime	October 6, 2021	1 season, 13 episodes	40–48 min	Ended
TMZ No BS	Celebrity	February 12, 2023	1 season, 19 episodes	50–76 min	Ended
TMZ Presents: UFO Revolution	Extraterrestrials	January 9, 2024	2 seasons, 6 episodes	57–64 min	Ended
Killing Hip Hop	Music	June 21, 2024	4 episodes	69–79 min	Miniseries
Khaby Is Coming to America	Travel	June 28, 2024	3 episodes	20–26 min	Miniseries
Defying Death	Natural disaster	August 7, 2024	3 episodes	51–59 min	Miniseries
Ms. Murder	True crime	September 11, 2024	3 episodes	55–62 min	Miniseries
Swipe Left or Death	True crime	December 18, 2024	3 episodes	56–64 min	Miniseries
Always, Lady London	Biography	October 10, 2025	3 episodes	48–54 min	Miniseries
Zero Star: The Cam Ward Story	Sports	December 4, 2025	6 episodes	23 min	Miniseries
Destination World Cup 2026	Sports	April 30, 2026	6 episodes	22 min	Miniseries
Deestroying the Pitch	Sports	June 4, 2026	3 episodes	26–40 min	Miniseries
Arena Access with Mariah Rose	Sports/Travel	September 3, 2026	1 season, 3 episodes	23–28	Pending
Just One Before I Die	Sports fandom	October 21, 2026	1 season, 5 episodes	53–62 min	Pending

===== Reality =====
Title	Genre	Premiere	Seasons	Runtime	Status
Nick Cannon's Big Drive	Reality	February 15, 2024	1 season, 8 episodes	22–23 min	Ended
House of Heat	Reality	June 6, 2024	1 season, 10 episodes	57–64 min	Ended
Escape the Night: The Lost Tapes	Reality competition	November 27, 2025	3 episodes	21-25 min	Miniseries
Busted on Bodycam	Reality	May 6, 2026	1 season, 3 episodes	20–22 min	Pending
Hosted by Nabela Noor	Reality	May 20, 2026	1 season, 6 episodes	20–32 min	Pending
Awaiting release
Don't Date Alone with Trisha Paytas	Dating show	February 4, 2027	TBA	30 min	Pending

===== Variety =====
Title	Genre	Premiere	Seasons	Runtime	Status
Kitchen Commando	Cooking show	February 12, 2023	1 season, 11 episodes	46–50 min	Ended
We Got Time Today	Talk show	November 19, 2024	2 seasons, 29 episodes	46–73 min	Pending
The Other Football	Sports talk show	May 27, 2026	1 season, 8 episodes	42–68 min	Pending
Substitute Teacher	Game show/Sketch comedy	June 25, 2026	1 season, 4 episodes	23–24 min	Pending
House Rules	Game show	July 16, 2026	1 season, 4 episodes	23–28 min	Pending

==== Professional wrestling ====
Title	Genre	Premiere	Seasons	Runtime	Status
WWE Evolve	Professional wrestling	March 5, 2025	2 seasons, 54 episodes	46–47 min	Season 2 ongoing
Lucha Libre AAA (Note: Lucha Libre AAA streams on Tubi exclusively in Mexico and Latin America.)	Professional wrestling	January 17, 2026	1 season, 22 episodes	Approx. 60 min	Season 1 ongoing
NWA Powerrr (season 27)	Professional wrestling	June 24, 2026	1 season, 17 episodes	Approx. 60 minutes	Season 27 ongoing

=== Upcoming original programming ===
Title	Genre	Premiere	Seasons	Runtime	Status
Why Are You Single?	Dating game show	2026	TBA	TBA	Pre-production
Wheel of Misfortune	Comedy reality	TBA	TBA	TBA	Series order
Yokoso Scooby-Doo!	Animated mystery comedy	TBA	TBA	TBA	Series order

=== Original documentaries ===
Title	Subject	Release date	Runtime
Famously Haunted: Amityville	Paranormal	October 15, 2021	1 h 23 min
Jason Kenzie Searching for Sasquatch	Paranormal	October 22, 2023	1 h
Celebrity Exorcism	Paranormal	October 22, 2021	1 h 33 min
Fresh Meat: Jeffrey Dahmer	True crime	November 24, 2021	1 h 29 min
Zombies! Prepping for the Apocalypse	Paranormal	December 31, 2021	1 h 24 min
Suburban Nightmare: Chris Watts	True crime	January 14, 2022	1 h 24 min
Pass the Mic: A Movement Generations in the Making	Music	February 16, 2022	1 h 26 min
Gone Before Her Time: When the Music Stopped	Music	March 2, 2022	1 h 27 min
Mysteries from the Grave: Titanic	History	April 8, 2022	1 h 24 min
Scariest Monsters in America	Paranormal	May 4, 2022	1 h 24 min
Sins of the Father: The Green River Killer	True crime	June 15, 2022	1 h 29 min
Aliens, Abductions, and UFOs: Roswell at 75	Paranormal	July 6, 2022	1 h 27 min
Killing Diana	Celebrity	August 31, 2022	1 h 24 min
TMZ Presents: Prince Fatal Secrets	Celebrity	September 23, 2022	1 h 6 min
Suburban Nightmare: The Menendez Brothers	True crime	September 28, 2022	1 h 25 min
Battle of the Beasts: Bigfoot vs. Yeti	Paranormal	October 12, 2022	1 h 24 min
Lights, Camera, Murder: Scream	True crime/Horror	October 26, 2022	1 h 24 min
Suburban Nightmare: JonBenét Ramsey	True crime	December 21, 2022	1 h 37 min
Branded & Brainwashed: Inside NXIVM	True crime	January 25, 2023	1 h 27 min
Love You to Death: The Jodi Arias Story	True crime	February 8, 2023	1 h 24 min
Queen of Cocaine	True crime	February 8, 2023	1 h 24 min
Dead Hot	Paranormal	April 14, 2023	1 h 38 min
Gone Before Her Time: Brittany Murphy	Celebrity	April 19, 2023	1 h 26 min
VICE News Presents: The Cult of Elon	Investigative journalism	April 24, 2023	1 h 7 min
TMZ Presents: Megan vs. Tory: What REALLY Went Down	Celebrity	April 26, 2023	58 min
VICE News Presents: Vigilante, Inc.	Investigative journalism/True crime	May 6, 2023	1 h 20 min
Evil Among Us: The Golden State Killer	True crime	May 10, 2023	1 h 30 min
Scariest Places in America	Paranormal	May 24, 2023	1 h 27 min
Mystery Unsolved: The Adnan Syed Story	True crime	June 7, 2023	1 h 24 min
VICE News Presents: Sold Out: Ticketmaster and the Resale Racket	Investigative journalism	June 11, 2023	1 h 6 min
Love You to Death: The Gabby Petito Story	True crime	June 21, 2023	1 h 32 min
Fire Front	Natural disaster	June 27, 2023	1 h 32 min
TMZ Presents: Child Star Syndrome: Triumphs, Tragedies & Trolls	Celebrity/Entertainment industry	June 28, 2023	1 h 1 min
Defying Death: Surviving Jaws	Near-death experiences	August 16, 2023	1 h 22 min
Queen of Crypto	Cryptocurrency	September 6, 2023	1 h 25 min
TMZ Presents: Tragically Viral	Celebrity	October 11, 2023	54 min
Fresh Meat: Killing Dahmer	True crime	November 22, 2023	1 h 20 min
Satan Wants You	True crime	December 22, 2023	1 h 28 min
VICE News Presents: Epstein Didn't Kill Himself	True crime	January 24, 2024	1 h 33 min
Gone Before His Time: Kobe Bryant	Sports	January 26, 2024	1 h 29 min
Vice News Presents: Mass Shooting America	True crime	February 7, 2024	59 min
Love You to Death: For Love or Money	Documentary	February 28, 2024	53 min
Love You to Death: Playbook for Murder	Documentary	March 6, 2024	53 min
TMZ Presents: Hollywood is High	Celebrity	March 13, 2024	98 min
Murdered in Paradise: Bludgeoned in Bali	Documentary	March 20, 2024	68 min
Murdered in Paradise: Killing in the Caribbean	Documentary	March 20, 2024	78 min
Murdered in Paradise: Mystery in Mexico	Documentary	March 20, 2024	96 min
Vice News Presents: When Black Women Go Missing	Documentary	March 29, 2024	65 min
Behind the Crime: Deadly Military Love Triangle	Documentary	April 3, 2024	76 min
TMZ Presents: Biggest Celebrity Beefs	Documentary	April 16, 2024	79 min
TMZ Presents: The Downfall of Diddy	Documentary	April 30, 2024	79 min
TMZ No BS: Hollywood Brawlers	Documentary	May 13, 2024	87 min
Most Famous Murder: The O.J. Simpson Trial	Documentary	May 29, 2024	87 min
Viewer Discretion Advised: The Story of OnlyFans and Courtney Clenney	Documentary	June 5, 2024	87 min
Sneaker Hustle	Documentary	July 10, 2024	75 min
New York Post Presents: Luigi Mangione Monster or Martyr?	Documentary	January 2, 2025	60 min
The Moment	Sports	February 6, 2026	1 h 16 min

=== Original films ===
Title	Genre	Release date	Runtime
A Chance for Christmas	Romantic comedy	June 18, 2021	1 h 32 min
Twisted House Sitter	Thriller	July 16, 2021	1 h 23 min
Swim	Thriller	August 13, 2021	1 h 26 min
Tales of a 5th Grade Robin Hood	Family comedy	August 27, 2021	1 h 24 min
The Deadliest Lie	Thriller	September 24, 2021	1 h 22 min
Harland Manor	Horror	October 29, 2021	1 h 31 min
Most Wanted Santa	Comedy drama	December 3, 2021	1 h 23 min
Girls Getaway Gone Wrong	Thriller	December 17, 2021	1 h 27 min
The Secrets of Christmas Revealed!	Comedy	December 20, 2021	1 h 25 min
War of the Worlds: Annihilation	Science fiction	December 24, 2021	1 h 53 min
First Person Shooter	Thriller	January 7, 2022	1 h 30 min
Hellblazers	Horror	January 21, 2022	1 h 24 min
Unborn	Horror	January 28, 2022	1 h 34 min
Howard High	Drama	February 4, 2022	1 h 42 min
10 Truths About Love	Romantic comedy	February 11, 2022	1 h 30 min
Romeo & Juliet Killers	Thriller	February 25, 2022	1 h 46 min
Deadly Cheer Mom	Thriller	March 25, 2022	1 h 27 min
Crushed	Comedy	April 1, 2022	1 h 30 min
Titanic 666	Supernatural horror	April 15, 2022	1 h 31 min
Lord of the Streets	Crime	April 22, 2022	1 h 24 min
Corrective Measures	Science fiction	April 29, 2022	1 h 46 min
Teardrop	Horror	May 11, 2022	1 h 28 min
Bad Influence	Thriller	May 20, 2022	1 h 29 min
Obsessed to Death	Thriller	May 31, 2022	1 h 29 min
The Stepmother	Thriller	June 17, 2022	1 h 29 min
Tow	Horror/Thriller	June 24, 2022	1 h 26 min
Eradication	Horror/Thriller	July 15, 2022	1 h 27 min
Love and Penguins	Romantic comedy	July 15, 2022	1 h 27 min
Dead Zone	Action/Horror	July 29, 2022	1 h 22 min
Shark Side of the Moon	Horror	August 12, 2022	1 h 28 min
Requiem for a Scream	Horror/Thriller	August 26, 2022	1 h 20 min
Time Pirates	Family comedy	September 9, 2022	1 h 33 min
Rush for Your Life	Thriller	September 16, 2022	1 h 25 min
Hot Take: The Depp/Heard Trial	Drama	September 30, 2022	1 h 24 min
Alone in the Dark	Thriller	October 7, 2022	1 h 27 min
The Final Rose	Thriller	October 14, 2022	1 h 31 min
Terror Train	Horror	October 21, 2022	1 h 32 min
A Party to Die For	Thriller	October 28, 2022	1 h 23 min
The Manny	Drama	November 11, 2022	1 h 28 min
Mistletoe Time Machine	Comedy	November 23, 2022	1 h 29 min
Bed Rest	Horror/Thriller	December 7, 2022	1 h 30 min
Prisoner of Love	Thriller	December 14, 2022	1 h 43 min
Girls Getaway Gone Wrong 2	Thriller	December 16, 2022	1 h 26 min
The Stepmother 2	Thriller	December 23, 2022	1 h 48 min
Terror Train 2	Horror	December 30, 2022	1 h 28 min
Good Wife's Guide to Murder	Thriller	January 6, 2023	1 h 24 min
The Assistant	Thriller	January 20, 2023	1 h 44 min
Immortal City Records	Thriller	January 27, 2023	1 h 36 min
Frankie Meets Jack	Romantic comedy	February 3, 2023	1 h 23 min
A Neighbor's Vendetta	Thriller	February 10, 2023	1 h 29 min
Alarmed	Thriller	February 17, 2023	1 h 26 min
Best Friend	Thriller	February 24, 2023	1 h 44 min
Deadly Estate	Thriller	March 3, 2023	1 h 24 min
Castaways	Thriller/Romance	March 8, 2023	1 h 31 min
You're Not Alone	Thriller/Romance	March 10, 2023	1 h 25 min
Butch Cassidy and the Wild Bunch	Western	March 17, 2023	1 h 46 min
Surprise	Thriller/Romance	March 28, 2023	1 h 26 min
Marry F*** Kill	Horror/Thriller	April 7, 2023	1 h 28 min
No Way Out	Action/Thriller	April 12, 2023	1 h 38 min
A Good Man	Thriller	April 13, 2023	1 h 36 min
Blood, Sweat and Cheer	Thriller	April 15, 2023	1 h 35 min
Murder at the Murder Mystery Party	Thriller	April 21, 2023	1 h 30 min
Bury the Bride	Horror	April 23, 2023	1 h 28 min
Classmates	Comedy	April 28, 2023	1 h 26 min
Hunting Games	Action/Thriller	May 5, 2023	1 h 33 min
Twisted Date	Thriller	May 12, 2023	1 h 37 min
Nightalk	Thriller	May 13, 2023	1 h 28 min
Mercy Falls	Horror/Thriller	May 14, 2023	1 h 48 min
The Getback	Action/Comedy/Drama	May 19, 2023	1 h 23 min
Killer Coworker	Thriller	May 20, 2023	1 h 23 min
Pastacolypse	Animation/Horror comedy	May 21, 2023	1 h 10 min
Hidden Exposure	Thriller	May 23, 2023	1 h 30 min
A Killer Romance	Thriller	May 26, 2023	1 h 36 min
The Amityville Curse	Horror/Thriller	May 28, 2023	1 h 30 min
Lyla	Horror	June 4, 2023	1 h 21 min
Deadly Secrets of a Cam Girl	Thriller	June 6, 2023	1 h 26 min
The Stepmother 3	Thriller	June 8, 2023	1 h 48 min
Trap House	Thriller/Action	June 9, 2023	1 h 22 min
She Came from the Woods	Horror	June 10, 2023	1 h 41 min
Trinket Box	Horror/Thriller	June 13, 2023	1 h 43 min
Magic Carpet Rides	Romantic comedy	June 14, 2023	1 h 49 min
Captive	Horror/Thriller	June 15, 2023	1 h 20 min
Butch vs. Sundance	Western	June 16, 2023	1 h 30 min
Play Dead	Horror/Thriller	June 17, 2023	1 h 46 min
DC Down	Action/Thriller	June 20, 2023	1 h 21 min
Incarcerated	Thriller	June 22, 2023	1 h 39 min
Cinnamon	Crime/Thriller	June 23, 2023	1 h 28 min
Gridiron Grind	Sports drama	June 23, 2023	1 h 36 min
Murder City	Action/Thriller	June 29, 2023	1 h 30 min
Twisted House Sitter 2	Thriller	June 30, 2023	1 h 36 min
Escaping Paradise	Action/Thriller	July 8, 2023	1 h 31 min
The Deep Web: Murdershow	Horror/Thriller	July 9, 2023	1 h 21 min
Cabin Girl	Horror/Thriller	July 12, 2023	1 h 27 min
Picture Me Dead	Thriller	July 13, 2023	1 h 32 min
Meet the Killer Parents	Thriller	July 14, 2023	1 h 23 min
No Filter	Horror/Thriller	July 15, 2023	1 h 31 min
Deadly Dilf	Thriller	July 20, 2023	1 h 37 min
The Lurking Fear	Horror/Thriller	July 21, 2023	1 h 21 min
Five Star Murder	Thriller	July 28, 2023	1 h 38 min
God Forgives, I Don't	Thriller	July 29, 2023	1 h 51 min
The Housekeeper	Thriller	August 9, 2023	1 h 28 min
Below Deck Deceit	Thriller	August 10, 2023	1 h 32 min
Echo Base	Science fiction thriller	August 10, 2023	1 h 20 min
Blind Waters	Horror/Thriller	August 12, 2023	1 h 40 min
Millennial Hunter	Animated action comedy	August 13, 2023	1 h 10 min
Twisted Neighbor	Thriller	August 17, 2023	1 h 29 min
Rock the Boat	Thriller	August 17, 2023	1 h 31 min
The Siege	Action	August 25, 2023	1 h 27 min
Hostile Forces	Action	August 25, 2023	1 h 49 min
Phoenix	Action	August 30, 2023	1 h 30 min
Twisted Marriage Therapist	Thriller	September 7, 2023	1 h 25 min
The Vigilante	Action	September 8, 2023	1 h 41 min
What Happens in the Dark	Thriller	September 14, 2023	1 h 25 min
Deadly Midwife	Thriller	September 15, 2023	1 h 31 min
Vicious Affair	Thriller	September 21, 2023	1 h 34 min
Accused	Crime/Thriller	September 22, 2023	1 h 27 min
Safehouse	Action	September 28, 2023	1 h 27 min
Out of Bounds	Thriller	October 5, 2023	1 h 23 min
Sorry, Charlie	Horror/Thriller	October 6, 2023	1 h 15 min
Sinister Assistant	Thriller	October 12, 2023	1 h 33 min
The Murdaugh Murders	Thriller/True crime	October 14, 2023	1 h 22 min
Surprise 2	Thriller	October 19, 2023	1 h 29 min
Dante's Hotel	Horror/Thriller	October 20, 2023	1 h 38 min
The Devil Comes to Kansas City	Action/Thriller	October 21, 2023	1 h 37 min
The Caregiver	Thriller	October 26, 2023	1 h 41 min
How to Frame a Family	Thriller	October 27, 2023	1 h 28 min
Still Here	Thriller	November 9, 2023	1 h 46 min
The Engagement Dress	Romantic comedy	November 10, 2023	1 h 26 min
Big Bruh	Animated comedy	November 12, 2023	1 h 6 min
The Last Exit	Horror/Thriller	November 16, 2023	1 h 35 min
Family Ornaments	Family comedy	November 17, 2023	1 h 25 min
I Hate You to Death	Thriller	November 23, 2023	1 h 40 min
Hot Girl Winter	Comedy	November 24, 2023	1 h 35 min
Black Mold	Horror/Thriller	December 7, 2023	1 h 32 min
Last Resort	Action	December 14, 2023	1 h 48 min
Dress for Success	Drama	December 15, 2023	1 h 24 min
Mírame	Horror/Thriller	December 19, 2023	1 h 37 min
Forever Us	Thriller	December 21, 2023	1 h 42 min
Out of Hand	Thriller	December 28, 2023	1 h 25 min
Where the Devil Roams	Horror	January 5, 2024	1 h 32 min
Prepare to Die	Action	January 13, 2024	1 h 32 min
Chapel	Action/Thriller	January 17, 2024	1 h 32 min
Tell No Lies	Thriller	January 18, 2024	1 h 44 min
Guess Who	Thriller	January 19, 2024	1 h 33 min
The Marriage Pass	Thriller	January 20, 2024	1 h 30 min
La Madre	Thriller	January 25, 2024	1 h 35 min
Played and Betrayed	Thriller	February 8, 2024	1 h 31 min
Final Heist	Thriller	February 9, 2024	1 h 23 min
My Bloody Galentine	Thriller	February 13, 2024	1 h 43 min
Prey for the Bride	Thriller	February 16, 2024	1 h 32 min
My Husband's Baby	Thriller	February 22, 2024	1 h 23 min
The Stepdaughter	Thriller	February 23, 2024	1 h 41 min
Romi	Horror/Science Fiction	March 14, 2024	1 h 26 min
You Shouldn't Have Let Me In	Horror	March 15, 2024	1 h 24 min
The Camp Host	Horror	March 16, 2024	1 h 34 min
Paradise	Thriller	March 21, 2024	1 h 38 min
Slay	Horror/Comedy	March 22, 2024	1 h 39 min
Kiss of Death	Thriller	March 23, 2024	1 h 37 min
Festival of the Living Dead	Horror	April 5, 2024	1 h 38 min
Snatched	Thriller	April 6, 2024	1 h 34 min
Lowlifes	Horror	April 11, 2024	1 h 36 min
Billion Dollar Bluff	Thriller	April 12, 2024	1 h 27 min
Earthquake Underground	Action/Thriller	April 19, 2024	1 h 23 min
This Never Happened	Thriller	April 26, 2024	1 h 27 min
My Husband Hired a Hitman	Thriller	April 27, 2024	1 h 29 min
Gossip to Die For	Thriller	May 3, 2024	1 h 34 min
Deadly Invitations	Thriller	May 9, 2024	1 h 28 min
Invasive	Thriller	May 10, 2024	1 h 37 min
Deadbolt	Thriller	May 11, 2024	1 h 55 min
A Stranger's Child	Thriller	May 15, 2024	1 h 28 min
Killer Body Count	Horror	May 17, 2024	1 h 36 min
War of the Worlds: Extinction	Action/Science fiction	May 24, 2024	1 h 24 min
Clickbait: Unfollowed	Horror	June 7, 2024	1 h 30 min
What Happens in Miami	Thriller	June 8, 2024	1 h 30 min
The Sintern	Thriller	June 13, 2024	1 h 37 min
Dark Deceptions	Thriller	June 13, 2024	1 h 21 min
Calamity Jane	Western	June 14, 2024	1 h 35 min
Rock the Boat 2	Thriller	June 15, 2024	1 h 24 min
Sins of the Bride	Thriller	June 20, 2024	1 h 28 min
Killer Beat	Thriller	June 26, 2024	1 h 36 min
Continental Split	Action/Thriller	June 28, 2024	1 h 28 min
Sinister Surgeon	Thriller	July 6, 2024	1 h 30 min
Camp	Drama	July 12, 2024	1 h 20 min
Spread	Comedy	July 19, 2024	1 h 34 min
Twin Lies	Thriller	July 20, 2024	1 h 35 min
The Piper	Horror	July 26, 2024	1 h 35 min
Blood, Beach Betrayal	Thriller	August 3, 2024	1 h 38 min
Hustlers Take All	Thriller	August 10, 2024	1 h 45 min
Aisha	Drama	August 17, 2024	1 h 34 min
On the Run	Thriller	August 17, 2024	1 h 39 min
Fit for Murder	Thriller	August 24, 2024	1 h 41 min
Secret Life of a Dominatrix	Thriller	August 31, 2024	1 h 30 min
Hazard	Action/Thriller	September 6, 2024	1 h 28 min
The Assistant 2	Thriller	September 7, 2024	1 h 44 min
Wynonna Earp: Vengeance	Supernatural Western	September 13, 2024	1 h 35 min
Lethal Lookalike: The Viktoria Nasyrova Story	Thriller	September 19, 2024	1 h 27 min
No Voltees	Horror	September 20, 2024	1 h 35 min
A Good Man 2	Thriller	September 28, 2024	1 h 52 min
Vicious Murder	Thriller	October 11, 2024	1 h 29 min
Killer Nurses	Thriller	October 17, 2024	1 h 31 min
Surprise 3	Thriller	October 25, 2024	1 h 42 min
The Stepdaughter 2	Thriller	November 8, 2024	1 h 37 min
Married to a Balla	Thriller	November 21, 2024	1 h 44 min
Toxic Harmony	Thriller	December 6, 2024	1 h 32 min
If I Go Missing	Thriller	December 13, 2024	1 h 30 min
Adopted	Thriller	December 20, 2024	1 h 23 min
Till Death Do Us Part	Thriller	December 27, 2024	1 h 30 min
Sugar Mama	Thriller	January 3, 2025	1 h 34 min
A Kill for a Kill	Thriller	January 17, 2025	1 h 35 min
Don't Mess with Grandma	Action/Thriller	January 24, 2025	1 h 21 min
Happy Anniversary	Thriller	January 31, 2025	1 h 27 min
Fatal Exposure	Thriller	February 7, 2025	1 h 32 min
Tempted	Thriller	February 14, 2025	1 h 27 min
Tarot Curse	Horror	February 21, 2025	1 h 30 min
Wrong Place, Wrong Time	Thriller	February 28, 2025	1 h 45 min
My Husband's Misteress	Thriller	March 14, 2025	1 h 28 min
Invasive 2: Getaway	Thriller	March 21, 2025	1 h 35 min
Ex Door Neighbor	Thriller	March 30, 2025	1 h 28 min
Play Dirty	Action/Thriller	April 4, 2025	1 h 24 min
Checkmate	Thriller	April 11, 2025	1 h 37 min
An Unusual Suspect	Thriller	April 25, 2025	1 h 28 min
Rhythm & Blood	Thriller	May 16, 2025	1 h 35 min
Worth the Wait	Romance	May 23, 2025	1 h 42 min
The Killing Cove	Thriller	May 30, 2025	1 h 40 min
Day of Reckoning	Action/Thriller	June 13, 2025	1 h 47 min
The Divorce Lawyer	Thriller	June 20, 2025	1 h 38 min
Please Don't Feed the Children	Horror	June 27, 2025	1 h 34 min
Great White Waters	Thriller	July 4, 2025	1 h 34 min
Get Off My Lawn	Horror	July 11, 2025	1 h 34 min
TKO	Thriller	July 18, 2025	2 h 25 min
The Ultimate Vendetta	Thriller	August 1, 2025	1 h 25 min
Can't Have it All	Thriller	August 15, 2025	1 h 39 min
President Down	Thriller	August 29, 2025	1 h 37 min
Dark Secret	Thriller	September 12, 2025	1 h 23 min
Takeout	Thriller	September 19, 2025	1 h 37 min
Match	Horror	October 3, 2025	1 h 39 min
Adopted 2	Thriller	October 10, 2025	1 h 42 min
R.L. Stine's Pumpkinhead	Horror	October 17, 2025	1 h 31 min
Fan of Mine	Thriller	November 7, 2025	1 h 42 min
Married to a Balla 2	Thriller	November 21, 2025	1 h 32 min
A Mother's Confession	Thriller	December 5, 2025	1 h 53 min
Hag	Horror	December 12, 2025	1 h 41 min
Broken Bonds	Thriller	January 2, 2026	1 h 49 min
Death Name	Horror	January 9, 2026	1 h 22 min
How to Lose a Popularity Contest	Romantic comedy	January 16, 2026	1 h 43 min
Twin	Thriller	January 23, 2026	1 h 33 min
Terri Joe: Missionary in Miami	Comedy	January 30, 2026	1 h 22 min
The Bachelorette Party	Thriller	February 6, 2026	1 h 22 min
Kissing Is the Easy Part	Romantic comedy	February 13, 2026	1 h 41 min
Unrequited	Thriller	February 20, 2026	1 h 34 min
Woman to Woman	Thriller	March 13, 2026	1 h 38 min
Rockabye	Thriller	March 27, 2026	1 h 37 min
The Caretaker	Thriller	April 10, 2026	1 h 22 min
Hive	Horror/Thriller	April 17, 2026	1 h 31 min
Hijacked	Thriller	April 24, 2026	1 h 20 min
The Battle for Castle Itter	Action	May 1, 2026	1 h 34 min
Give Me Back My Baby	Thriller	May 8, 2026	1 h 27 min
I Didn't Do It	Thriller	May 22, 2026	1 h 26 min
Night Shift	Thriller	June 5, 2026	1 h 28 min
Stepfather	Thriller	June 19, 2026	1 h 36 min
Summer's Last Resort	Comedy	July 3, 2026	1 h 37 min
The One Next Door	Thriller	July 10, 2026	1 h 39 min
I Know Where You Live	Thriller	July 24, 2026	1 h 29 min
A Good Man 3	Thriller	August 7, 2026	1 h 59 min
My Husband's Sister	Thriller	August 21, 2026	1 h 23 min
The Delivery Girl	Thriller	September 11, 2026	1 h 32 min
Buzzkill	Horror comedy	September 25, 2026	1 h 36 min
R.L. Stine's Pumpkinhead 2	Horror	October 9, 2026	1 h 33 min
Psycho Side Chick	Thriller	October 16, 2026	1 h 32 min
One Night Stand	Thriller	October 30, 2026	1 h 27 min
Don't Quit	Thriller	November 13, 2026	1 h 37 min
Awaiting release
Sidelined 3: End Game	Sports romantic drama	November 26, 2026	1 h 30 min

=== Sports ===
==== United States ====
Through Fox Sports, Tubi currently has the rights to show live matches from the NBA G League, UEFA Nations League, CONCACAF, and Liga MX/Liga MX Femenil. With the exception of the G League (which are shown on its own channel in the app), these games are shown on the channel Fox Sports on Tubi.

During the 2022 FIFA World Cup, Tubi offered all matches on-demand 30 minutes after they ended. During the 2023 World Baseball Classic, Tubi showed select games live. Tubi streamed Fox's coverage of Super Bowl LIX for free on February 9, 2025, along with its own unique pregame show. Tubi also simulcasted the 2025 Thanksgiving football game. In 2026, Tubi will exclusively air select games from the 2026 World Baseball Classic, simulcast Mexico and the United States' opening matches from the 2026 FIFA World Cup and simulcast the 2026 Thanksgiving football game.

Tubi offers several free ad-supported streaming Sports TV channels through their Live TV service. As of February 2025, these channels include offerings from the National Football League, National Basketball Association, Major League Baseball, NASCAR, Ultimate Fighting Championship, DAZN, PGA Tour, National Hockey League, Top Rank Boxing, FuboTV, PokerGO, Big 12 Conference, Atlantic Coast Conference, HBO Boxing, Women's Sports Network, beIN Sports, Motor Trend, Stadium, National Hot Rod Association, FanDuel TV and Real Madrid CF.

==== International ====
On December 18, 2024, it was announced that starting with the Liga MX and Liga MX Femenil Torneo Clausura 2025, the platform will begin showing the home games of the León and Pachuca clubs as well as their female counterparts for free in Mexico, Guatemala, El Salvador, Costa Rica, Panama, and Ecuador.

On February 3, 2025, CONCACAF revealed that Tubi had acquired the rights to broadcast the CONCACAF Champions Cup in Mexico.

On February 19, 2025, it was made official that the service had acquired the rights to stream 50% of Premier League matches in Mexico and Central America starting from Matchday 26 of the 2024-25 season. It was later revealed that the platform had also acquired the FA Cup television rights in those regions.

Subsequently, in the Clausura 2025, it was confirmed that the home games of FC Juárez Men's and Women's as well as those of Tigres (whose broadcasting rights are held by Azteca Deportes) would also begin to be streamed through Tubi.
