= Farhad Massoudi =

Iranian-American entrepreneur

- Education: University of California, Berkeley (BS)

Farhad Massoudi is an Iranian-American entrepreneur known for his contributions to the streaming media industry. He is the founder and former CEO of Tubi, a Free ad-supported streaming television service.

== Early life and education ==
Farhad Massoudi attended the University of California, Berkeley, where he earned a Bachelor of Science degree in Electrical Engineering and Computer Science.

== Career ==
=== AdRise ===
In 2010, Farhad Massoudi founded AdRise, a company focused on providing advertising solutions for streaming media, it eventually partnered with Hasbro Studios to launch their own AVOD free streaming app on Roku devices.

=== Tubi ===
In 2014 Farhad Massoudi founded Tubi, under his leadership, Tubi grew into one of the largest ad-supported video-on-demand services, offering content from major studios and networks.

Tubi's innovative model and extensive content library attracted millions of users, positioning it as a key player in the streaming industry. The platform's success led to its acquisition by Fox Corporation (formed from the 2019 spinoff of the Fox Broadcasting Company, Fox News and the U.S. operations of Fox Sports from 21st Century Fox due to their acquisition by The Walt Disney Company) in March 2020 for $440 million. Following the acquisition, Tubi saw significant growth, including becoming the first free streaming service to account for 1% of total TV viewing time in February 2023.

In April 2023, it was announced that Farhad Massoudi would step down as CEO as part of a broader restructuring within Fox Corporation to form the Tubi Media Group, with Paul Cheesbrough taking over as the new CEO. He left on good terms and was quoted "I know that I am leaving Tubi in the best shape it has ever been, and its future is very bright".

=== Swift ===
In July 2024, Massoudi joined Swift Ventures as Executive in Residence (EIR).

== Personal life ==
Massoudi resides in San Francisco, California. Outside of his professional endeavors, he is known for his philanthropic activities and support of various charitable causes.
