= Magisto =

American technology company (2009-2019)

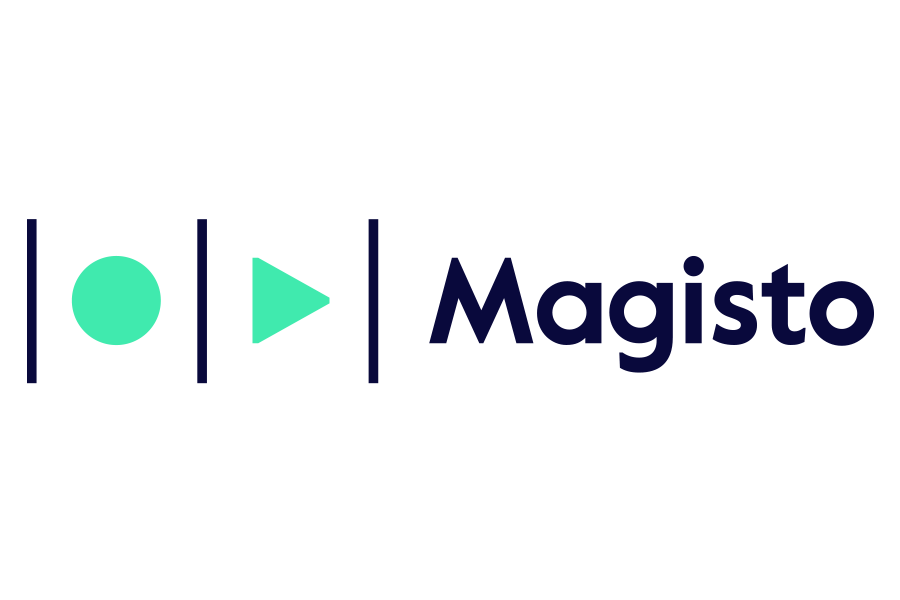
- Industry: Video editing and video marketing
- Founded: 2009; 17 years ago
- Founder: Oren Boiman; Alex Rav-Acha
- Defunct: 2019; 7 years ago
- Fate: Acquired by Vimeo and shut down
- Headquarters: Mountain View, California, U.S.
- Products: Magisto Web Online Video Editor; Magisto Mobile App Video Editor
- Parent: Vimeo

Magisto provided an online video editing tool (both as a web application and a mobile app) for automated video editing and production. In 2019, the company was acquired by Vimeo for an estimated US$200 million.

The Magisto app contained a library of music. The music, largely by independent artists, was sorted by mood and is licensed for in-app use.

Magisto had a freemium business model where users can create basic video clips for free. In addition, advanced business, professional and personal service tiers are available via various subscription plans, unlocking more features; such as longer videos, HD, premium themes, customization, and control features.

== History ==
Magisto was founded in 2009 as SightEra (LTD) by Oren Boiman (CEO) and Alex Rav-Acha (CTO). Boiman, a computer scientist that graduated from Tel Aviv University, followed with graduate work in computer vision at the Weizmann Institute of Science. Boiman developed several patent-pending image analysis technologies that analyze unedited videos to identify the most interesting parts. The system recognized faces, animals, landscapes, action sequences, movements and other important content within the video, as well as analyzing speech and audio. These scenes are then edited together, along with music and effects.

Magisto was launched publicly on September 20, 2011, as a video editing software web application through which users could upload unedited video footage, choose a title and soundtrack and have their video edited for them automatically. On the following day, Magisto was added to YouTube Create's collection of video production applications.

The Magisto iPhone app was launched publicly at the 2012 International Consumer Electronics Show (CES) in Las Vegas. At CES, the company was also awarded first place in the 2012 CES Mobile App Showdown. In August 2012, Magisto launched the Android app on Google Play. In September 2012, Magisto launched a Google Chrome App and announced Google Drive integration.

In March 2013, Magisto announced it had 5 million users. Google listed Magisto as an "Editors’ Choice" on its list of "Best Apps of 2013".

In February 2014, Magisto released a statement that they had 20 million users, with 2 million new users per month. The company also confirmed investment from Mail.Ru.

In September 2014, Magisto released a feature called 'Instagram Ready' which allowed users to upload 15 second clips that are automatically formatted for Instagram. In the same month, Magisto launched a feature for iOS and Android users, called 'Surprise Me', which created video from still photography on users’ smartphones.

In October 2014, Magisto was placed 9th on the 2014 Deloitte Israel Technology Fast 50 list and named as a finalist in the Red Herring's Top 100 Europe award.

In July 2015, Magisto released an editing theme dedicated to Jerry Garcia.

In April 2019, the company was acquired by Vimeo, the IAC-owned platform for hosting, sharing and monetizing streamed video, for an estimated $200 million.

=== Financing ===
In 2011, the company received more than $5.5 million in a Series B venture round funding from Magma Venture Partners and Horizons Ventures. In September that year, at the same time as the public launch of their web application, Magisto announced a $5.5 million Series B funding round led by Li Ka-shing’s Horizons Ventures. Li Ka-Shing is known for making early-stage investments in companies like Facebook, Spotify, SecondMarket and Siri.

In October 2013, the company received $13 million in funding from Qualcomm and Sandisk.

In 2014, the company received $2 million in Venture Funding from Magma Venture Partners, Qualcomm Ventures, Horizons Ventures and the Mail.Ru Group.

== Awards ==
- Magisto won first place at Technonomy3, an annual Internet Technology start-up competition in Israel. Judges of the competition included Jeff Pulver, TechCrunch editor Mike Butcher, investor Yaron Samid, Bessemer Venture Partners Israel partner Adam Fisher and Brad McCarty of The Next Web.
- Magisto won first place at CES 2012 Mobile app competition, during the launch of Magisto iOS mobile app.
- Magisto was awarded twice the Google Play Editor's Choice and was part of iPhone App Store Best App awards for 2013 and 2014, and Wired Essential iPad Apps.
- Magisto was declared by Deloitte as the 7th fastest growing company in Europe, the Middle East, and Africa in 2016.

== See also ==
- Video editing
- Video server
- Edit Decision List
- Photo slideshow software
- Video scratching
- Video editing software
- Comparison of video editing software
- List of video editing software
- Web application
- Web Processing Service
- High-definition video
