= Michael Rapaport =

American actor and comedian (born 1970)

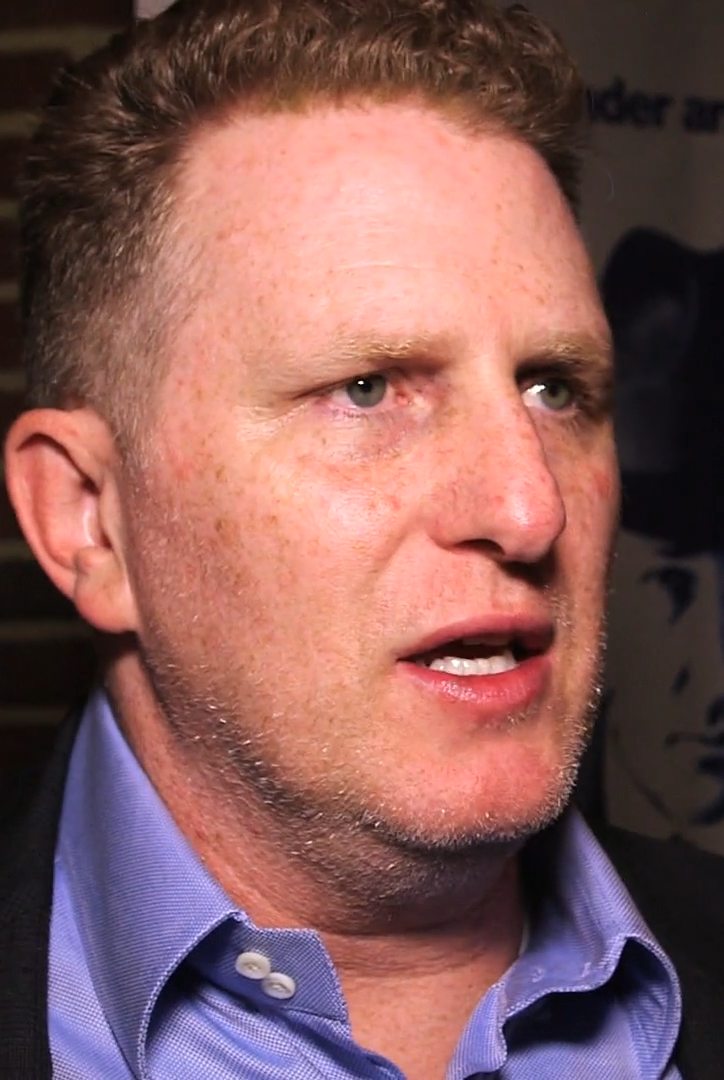
- Rapaport in 2015
- Born: Michael David Rapaport; March 20, 1970 (age 56); New York City, U.S.
- Occupations: Actor; director; podcast host; comedian
- Years active: 1990–present
- Spouses: Nichole Beattie (m. 2000; div. 2007) Kebe Dunn (m. 2016)
- Children: 2
- Relatives: Claudia Lonow (half-sister)

Michael David Rapaport (born March 20, 1970) is an American actor, comedian, and podcast host. His film roles include Zebrahead (1992), True Romance (1993), Higher Learning (1995), Metro (1997), Cop Land (1997), Deep Blue Sea (1999), The 6th Day (2000), Dr. Dolittle 2 (2001), Big Fan (2009), and The Heat (2013). On television, he headlined the Fox sitcom The War at Home (2005–2007) and was a series regular on the Fox drama Boston Public (2001–2004), the fourth season of the Fox serial drama Prison Break (2008–2009), and the Netflix comedy drama Atypical (2017–2021). Rapaport held recurring roles on the NBC sitcoms Friends (1999), My Name Is Earl (2007–2008), and Justified (2014). Outside of his acting career, Rapaport directed the 2011 documentary Beats, Rhymes & Life: The Travels of A Tribe Called Quest about the hip hop group A Tribe Called Quest. Active on several podcasts, he is the host of the I Am Rapaport Stereo Podcast.

== Early life and education ==
Rapaport was born in New York City, the son of June Brody, a New York radio personality, and David Rapaport, a radio executive who was the general manager of the all-disco format at New York radio station WKTU Disco 92. He has a brother named Eric Rapaport and an older half-sister, Claudia Lonow (née Rapaport), via his father's prior marriage to JoAnne Astrow. Lonow's daughter Isabella Roland is a comedian and actress best known for her work on the American website Dropout.

Rapaport grew up on the Upper East Side of Manhattan, near 70th Street and York Avenue. He is Ashkenazi Jewish; his family were originally Polish and Russian Jews.

He attended Erasmus Hall High School in Brooklyn in the 1980s, and was expelled. He graduated from Martin Luther King High School in Manhattan.

== Career ==
In 1989, Rapaport moved to Los Angeles, California when he was 19 years old to try to become a stand-up comic. Rapaport's stepfather, comic Mark Lonow, who owned The Improv with Budd Friedman, helped him get into the stand-up world. He did that for three years.

His big break in acting was on the TV series China Beach.

Rapaport had a recurring role in My Name Is Earl as Frank, a convict Earl reunites with in prison. He played Homeland Security Agent Don Self in the fourth season of Prison Break.

In October 2008, Rapaport announced that he was directing a documentary about hip hop act A Tribe Called Quest. The film, Beats, Rhymes & Life: The Travels of A Tribe Called Quest, was released in 2011 and received mostly positive reviews.

Rapaport guest starred in the fifth season of the FX series Justified as villain Daryl Crowe Jr.

On February 12, 2010, Rapaport participated in the NBA All-Star Weekend's Celebrity Game and was named the MVP because of his defense on football player Terrell Owens, the MVP of the last two Celebrity Games, despite scoring just four points and having only a single rebound.

On April 17, 2014, an ESPN 30 for 30 film he directed premiered at the Tribeca Film Festival. The film, When the Garden Was Eden, was about the 1970s championship-winning New York Knicks led by Earl Monroe, Walt Frazier, and Willis Reed.

Rapaport hosts the I Am Rapaport Stereo Podcast with childhood friend Gerald Moody.

On June 19, 2017, Rapaport announced on Twitter that he would be joining the sports media website Barstool Sports where he would be a correspondent for the podcast Pardon My Take. On February 18, 2018, Rapaport was fired from Barstool Sports after making a rude comment toward their fan base.

Rapaport is a reporter for Fox Sports, covering the Big3 basketball league formed by Ice Cube.

In 2023, Rapaport competed in season ten of The Masked Singer as the wild card contestant "Pickle". A running gag is that he would bump into Nick Cannon. Rapaport was eliminated on "2000s Night".

In 2026, Rapaport became a contestant on the reality TV show The Traitors. His comment toward fellow season 4 contestant Colton Underwood drew criticism as homophobic.

== Personal life ==
On May 18, 1997, Rapaport was arrested for harassing ex-girlfriend Lili Taylor and charged with two counts of aggravated harassment. He pleaded guilty to the charges in court and New York Supreme Court Justice Arlene Goldberg issued a protection order to keep the actor from contacting Taylor, as well as mandating that he undergo counseling sessions.

In 2000, Rapaport married writer and producer Nichole Beattie. They have two sons. They divorced in 2007.

In 2005, Rapaport wrote an article for Jane magazine about having to evict the actress Natasha Lyonne from a property he was renting to her during a period of heavy drug use on her part. The two have since reconciled and remain friends.

In 2016, Rapaport married his long time girlfriend, actress Kebe Dunn.

In June 2018, while on an American Airlines flight from Houston to Los Angeles, Rapaport stopped another passenger attempting to open an emergency door mid-flight.

== Political views ==
After the October 7, 2023 Hamas-led attack on Israel, Rapaport appeared in many independent activist shorts supporting the release of hostages taken by Hamas and its affiliates. Rapaport has since become a vocal pro-Israel advocate. He has made multiple trips to Israel since late 2023, including visits to sites affected by the attacks and to Hostage Square, where he has spoken at rallies.

Rapaport has publicly criticized what he views as a lack of support for Israel within the entertainment industry and has urged Jewish people to "reclaim and proudly own the term 'Zionist'". He also appeared on the Israeli satirical show Eretz Nehederet, mocking responses to antisemitism and the silence of some Hollywood figures regarding the conflict. He has said that his vocal stance has cost him acting jobs, but that he has no regrets about his advocacy.

In February 2025, the militant pro-Israel group Betar US posted a video of Rapaport on social media, in which he praised the far-right Rabbi and convicted terrorist Meir Kahane, saying that "Kahane was always right."

On December 31, 2025, Rapaport announced that he will be running for mayor of New York City in 2029.

== Filmography ==
=== Film ===
Year	Title	Role	Notes
1992	Zebrahead	Zack	
1993	Point of No Return	Big Stan	
1993	Poetic Justice	Dockworker	
1993	Money for Nothing	Kenny Kozlowski	
1993	True Romance	Dick Ritchie	
1994	Hand Gun	Lenny	
1994	The Scout	Tommy Lacy	
1994	The Foot Shooting Party	Lizard	Short
1995	Higher Learning	Remy	
1995	The Basketball Diaries	Skinhead	
1995	Kiss of Death	Ronnie Gannon	
1995	Mighty Aphrodite	Kevin	
1996	Beautiful Girls	Paul Kirkwood	
1996	The Pallbearer	Brad Schorr	
1997	Metro	Kevin McCall	
1997	A Brother's Kiss	Stingy	
1997	Kicked in the Head	Stretch	
1997	Cop Land	Murray Babitch	
1998	Illtown	Dante	
1998	Palmetto	Donnelly	
1998	Some Girl	Neal	
1998	The Naked Man	Edward Bliss Jr.	
1999	Deep Blue Sea	Tom Scoggins	
1999	Kiss Toledo Goodbye	Kevin Gower	
2000	Next Friday	Mailman with Tax Notice	
2000	Small Time Crooks	Denny	
2000	Men of Honor	GM1 Snowhill	
2000	Bamboozled	Thomas Dunwitty	
2000	Chain of Fools	Hitman	
2000	King of the Jungle	Francis	
2000	Lucky Numbers	Dale	
2000	The 6th Day	Hank Morgan	
2001	Dr. Dolittle 2	Joey the Raccoon (voice)	
2002	Paper Soldiers	Mike E.	
2002	Triggermen	Tommy O'Brian	
2002	29 Palms	The Cop	
2002	Comic Book Villains	Norman Link	Video
2003	A Good Night to Die	August	
2003	This Girl's Life	Terry the Car Salesman	
2004	The N Word	Himself	
2004	America Brown	Daniel Brown	
2004	Scrambled Eggs	Drama Teacher	Short
2005	Hitch	Ben	
2006	Special	Les Franken	
2006	Live Free or Die	Lt. Putney	
2006	Push	Tommy G	
2006	Grilled	Bobby	
2006	It Aint Easy	-	Video
2008	Assassination of a High School President	Coach Z	
2009	Big Fan	Philadelphia Phil	
2009	A Day in the Life	Detective Grant	
2009	Tom Cool	-	
2011	Inside Out	Jack Small	
2012	Should've Been Romeo	Danny	
2012	The Baytown Outlaws	Lucky	
2012	Kiss of the Damned	Ben	
2013	The Heat	Jason Mullins	
2013	Once Upon a Time in Queens	Bobby DiBianco	
2014	My Man Is a Loser	Marty	
2015	Little Boy	James Busbee	
2016	A Stand Up Guy	Colin	
2016	Chuck	John Wepner	
2016	Sully	Pete the Bartender	
2016	Middle School: The Worst Years of My Life	Animation Voice (voice)	
2019	100%: Julian Edelman	Narrator	
2020	Blackjack: The Jackie Ryan Story	Bill Fitch	
2021	Conflicted	Mike	
2023	I'll Be Right There	Marshall	
2023	Glisten and the Merry Mission	Grizz (voice)	
2025	October 8	Himself	

=== Television ===
Year	Title	Role	Notes
1990	China Beach	Kravits	Episode: "One Small Step"
1992	Murphy Brown	Robbie	Episode: "He-Ho, He-Ho, It's Off to Lamaze We Go"
1992	Middle Ages	Jimmy	Episode: "The Pig in the Python" & "Night Moves"
1993	The Fresh Prince of Bel-Air	Mike	Episode: "Where There's a Will, There's a Way: Part 1"
1993	NYPD Blue	Jaime Dileo	Episode: "Brown Appetit"
1997	Subway Stories	Jake	Episode: "The Listeners"
1998	ER	Paul Canterna	Episode: "Of Past Regret and Future Fear"
1998	Rude Awakening	Johnny	Episode: "Naked Again"
1998	Rescuers: Stories of Courage: Two Families	Szarany	TV movie
1999	Friends	Gary	Recurring cast (season 5)
2001	Weakest Link	Himself	Episode: "Disaster Benefit"
2001	Celebrity Adventures	Himself	Episode: "Belize"
2001	Night Visions	Harlow Winton	Episode: "Darkness"
2001–2004	Boston Public	Danny Hanson	Main cast (season 2–4)
2003	Chappelle's Show	Popcopy Employee	Episode: "Popcopy & Clayton Bigsby"
2005–2007	The War at Home	David "Dave" Gold	Main cast
2006	Thugaboo: Sneaker Madness	DJ (voice)	TV movie
2006–2007	MadTV	Clark Gable/Abraham Lincoln	2 episodes
2007–2008	My Name Is Earl	Frank Stump	Recurring cast (season 3)
2008–2009	Prison Break	Agent Donald "Don" Self	Main cast (season 4)
2009–2010	Accidentally on Purpose	Sully	Episode: "The Godfather" & "The Rock"
2010	30 for 30	Himself	Episode: "Winning Time: Reggie Miller vs. The New York Knicks"
2010	Celebrity Ghost Stories	Himself	Episode: "Rebecca DeMornay/Michael Rapaport/Margaret Cho"
2010	Royal Pains	Stanley	Episode: "Big Whoop"
2010	The Line	Steve Waxman	TV movie
2010–2013	Pound Puppies	Squirt (voice)	Main cast
2012–2013	The Mob Doctor	Paul Moretti	Recurring cast
2013	The Haunting of...	Himself	Episode: "Michael Rapaport"
2014	Raising Hope	Michael	Episode: "Man's Best Friend"
2014	Justified	Daryl Crowe Jr.	Recurring cast (season 5)
2015	Black-ish	Jay Simmons	Episode: "Switch Hitting"
2015	Louie	Lenny	Episode: "Cop Story"
2015	Public Morals	Officer Charlie Bullman	Main cast
2015	The Big Bang Theory	Kenny Fitzgerald	Episode: "The Helium Insufficiency"
2016	Law & Order: Special Victims Unit	Richie Caskey	Episode: "Sheltered Outcasts"
2016	Dice	Bobby the Mooch	Episode: "Six Grand"
2016	Crisis in Six Scenes	Trooper Mike	Episode #1.6
2017	The $100,000 Pyramid	Himself	Episode: "Richard Kind vs. Rachel Dratch and Margaret Cho vs. Michael Rapaport"
2017	The New Edition Story	Gary Evans	Episode: "Part 1-3"
2017	Animals.	Erik (voice)	Episode: "Rats"
2017	White Famous	Teddy Snow	Recurring cast
2017–2018	The Guest Book	Adam	Recurring cast (season 1), guest (season 2)
2017–2021	Atypical	Doug Gardner	Main cast
2018	Hip Hop Squares	Himself/Panelist	Episode: "Blac Chyna vs. Jeremy Meeks" & "Yvonne Orji vs. Keith Powers"
2018	Ridiculousness	Himself	Episode: "Michael Rapaport"
2019–2023	The Simpsons	Mike Wegman (voice)	Guest cast (season 31 & 33–34)
2020	Sneakerheads	Himself	Episode: "The Match"
2020	Yo Mama	Himself	Episode: "I PAID Celebs $3,000 for YO MAMA JOKES"
2020	Cooked with Cannabis	Himself	Episode: "High Holidays"
2020	Tournament of Laughs	Himself	Episode: "The Exceptional 8"
2021–2022	The Wendy Williams Show	Himself/Guest Host	Recurring guest host (season 14)
2022	Celebrity Wheel of Fortune	Himself/Contestant	Episode: "Jaime Camil, Michael Rapaport and June Diane Raphael"
2022	Life & Beth	Leonard	Recurring cast
2022	Only Murders in the Building	Detective Kreps	Recurring cast (season 2)
2023	The Masked Singer	Himself/Pickle	Season 10 contestant
2023	Eretz Nehederet	Albus Dumbledore; Himself	Guest (season 21)
2024	Fallout	Knight Titus	Episode: "The Target"
2026	The Traitors	Himself	Season 4 contestant

=== Documentary ===
Year	Title	Role
2011	Beats, Rhymes & Life: The Travels of a Tribe Called Quest	Interviewer

=== Video games ===
Year	Title	Role
1996	Don't Quit Your Day Job	Special appearance #2
2001	Grand Theft Auto III	Joey Leone
2006	Saints Row	Troy Bradshaw
2008	Saints Row 2	Troy Bradshaw
2018	NBA 2K19	Coach Darren Stackhouse

=== Music videos ===
Year	Artist	Title
1998	Jay-Z	"The City is Mine"
2002	Talib Kweli	"Waiting for the DJ"
2003	High & Mighty	"I Wanna"
2003	Jaylib	"McNasty Filth"
2004	Masta Ace	"A Long Hot Summer"
2006	Ludacris	"Runaway Love"
2006	H_{2}O	"What Happened?"
2017	Snoop Dogg	"Lavender (Nightfall Remix)"
2017	Sean Price	"Dead or Alive"

=== Music album ===
Year	Artist	Title
1994	Frank Zappa	Civilization Phaze III

== Works and publications ==
- Rapaport, Michael (2017). This Book Has Balls. New York: Touchstone. ISBN 978-1-501-16031-8. OCLC 975365440.
