= JoAnne Astrow =

American comedian and talent manager (born 1938)

- Born: June 24, 1938 (age 88); Brooklyn, New York, U.S.
- Occupations: Actress; comedian; producer; talent manager
- Spouses: David Rapaport (divorced) Mark Lonow (m. 1969)
- Children: Claudia Lonow
- Relatives: Isabella Roland (granddaughter)

JoAnne Astrow (born 1938) is an American actress, comedian, producer, and talent manager.

== Early life ==
Astrow was born and raised in Brooklyn, New York, in a Jewish family of Russian, Hungarian, and Austrian descent. She wanted to become a performer at an early age. Her brother, Herb, also acted growing up and then worked in the textile industry and owned a restaurant.

== Career ==
Astrow began her career as an improv comedian and commercial actress in New York City. She and her husband, Mark Lonow, created the improv show Off the Wall with other actors including Henry Winkler.

In 1976, Astrow and her family drove to Los Angeles for a vacation and then stayed there to pursue their careers. Her friend Elayne Boosler encouraged her to begin doing stand-up comedy at a time when that was relatively rare for women. She became a successful touring comedian and appeared on shows including The Tonight Show Starring Johnny Carson. In 1979, she helped lead the strike at the Comedy Store in West Hollywood, which resulted in the club's owner, Mitzi Shore, beginning to pay performers at the venue. However, Shore subsequently banned Astrow from performing at the Comedy Store. After the strike, Astrow succeeded Tom Dreesen as the acting chair of Comedians for Compensation, the union that formed for the purposes of the strike.

After retiring from stand-up, Astrow became a talent manager for comedians including Lewis Black, Kathleen Madigan, Niecy Nash, and Doug Stanhope. In 2007, she and her husband earned nominations for the Primetime Emmy Award for Outstanding Variety, Music or Comedy Special as executive producers for Black's special Lewis Black: Red, White and Screwed. In 2012, they co-produced Black's one-man Broadway show Running on Empty.

In 2017, Astrow and Lonow co-produced the off-Broadway play Cruel Intentions: The '90s Musical. Other production credits on Broadway included The Prom and A Christmas Carol. They co-wrote the play Jews, Christians, and Screwing Stalin, inspired by Lonow's family, which premiered at the Matrix Theatre in Los Angeles in 2018. In 2025, they acted in the dark comedy film D(e)ad, which was directed by her daughter, Claudia Lonow, and written by and starring her granddaughter, Isabella Roland.

== Personal life ==
Astrow's first marriage was to David Rapaport, the father of actor Michael Rapaport. They had a daughter, Claudia, who also became an actress and comedian. Astrow met her second husband, Mark Lonow, while studying at the Herbert Berghof Studio. The couple married on February 9, 1969. After becoming grandparents, they shared a household for many years with Claudia and their granddaughter, Isabella Roland. The living arrangement inspired Claudia's show How to Live with Your Parents (For the Rest of Your Life), in which the grandmother is played by Elizabeth Perkins.
