= List of My Little Pony: Pony Life episodes =

My Little Pony: Pony Life is an animated children's television series based on Hasbro's My Little Pony franchise. The series was produced by Entertainment One, in collaboration with Boulder Media. The series is the successor and spin-off to 2010's My Little Pony: Friendship Is Magic and the fourth animated series based on the franchise overall. The series features a new animation style, setting and comedic tone. The series aired on Treehouse TV in Canada on June 21, 2020 and on Discovery Family in the United States on November 7, 2020. A second season was announced before the series made its debut in the United States. The second season aired on Tiny Pop in the UK on April 2, 2021, and in the United States on Discovery Family, following it on April 10, 2021.

== Series overview ==
Season	Episodes	Originally released	
Season	Episodes	First released	Last released
1	26	November 7, 2020	February 6, 2021
2	14	April 10, 2021	May 22, 2021

== Episodes ==
=== Season 1 (2020–21) ===
No. overall	No. in season	Title	Written by	Original release date	Prod. code
1	1	"Princess Probz" (Parts 1 and 2)	Katie Chilson	November 7, 2020 (Note: These episodes aired on Treehouse TV on June 21, 2020.)	101
The ponies help Pinkie Pie audition for a televised cooking competition called the Royal Jelly Juggernaut. When the rest of the Mane 6 are caught in a sticky situation, Pinkie Pie has to audition for the Royal Jelly Juggernaut all on her own.
2	2	"The Best of the Worst" (Parts 1 and 2)	Whitney Ralls	November 7, 2020	102
Rainbow Dash's competitive spirit is put to the test when a new pony challenges her to a contest unlike any other. Rainbow Dash faces off against Dishwater Slog in loser-take-all race to finally prove which pony is truly the worst.
3	3	"How Applejack Got Her Hat Back" (Parts 1 and 2)	Katie Chilson	November 14, 2020 (Note: These episodes aired on Treehouse TV on June 28, 2020.)	103
Applejack finds herself in the midst of an identity crisis when her signature hat becomes a city-wide fashion craze. Applejack joins a group of alternative ponies in the hopes of finding a new style to replace her old look.
4	4	"Cute-Pocalypse Meow" (Parts 1 and 2)	Katie Chilson	November 14, 2020	104
As Pinkie Pie practices for the Royal Jelly Juggernaut, Fluttershy makes an adorable new friend with a dark sense of humor. Fluttershy has to muster all of her cuteness to protect her friends from Bubbles' dark side.
5	5	"Bad Thing No. 3" (Parts 1 and 2)	Whitney Ralls	November 21, 2020 (Note: These episodes aired on Treehouse TV on July 5, 2020.)	105
Rarity tries to get rid of her bad luck before it can ruin her relationship with a new friend. As Rarity continues to deal with her bad luck, she receives some much-needed advice from an unexpected source: herself.
6	6	"Pinkie Pie: Hyper-Helper" (Parts 1 and 2)	Katie Chilson	November 21, 2020	106
Pinkie Pie struggles to help out her friends while preparing for the final round of the Royal Jelly Juggernaut. As Pinkie Pie enters the final round of the Royal Jelly Juggernaut, the other ponies rally behind her.
7	7	"The Trail Less Trotten"	Whitney Ralls	November 28, 2020 (Note: These episodes aired on Treehouse TV on July 12, 2020.)	107
7	7	"Death of a Sales-Pony"	Katie Chilson	November 28, 2020	107
"The Trail Less Trotten": Fluttershy is excited to become a member of the Trail Trotters and hopes to earn enough badges to meet dolphin celebrity Finn Tastic. However, Applejack receives a letter stating that Fluttershy and her friends are too old to enter. Unwilling to hurt Fluttershy's feelings, her friends all decide to pretend to be in a troop. "Death of a Sales-Pony": The girls open up a cookie baking business in order to earn their first Trail Trotters badge. At first, everypony is having fun but Fluttershy starts to become bossy and begins pushing everypony too hard.
8	8	"Bighoof Walking"	Taneka Stotts	November 28, 2020	108
8	8	"The Fluttershy Effect"	Taneka Stotts	November 28, 2020	108
"Bighoof Walking": In order to get the rare animal sighting badge, Fluttershy decides to track down the elusive Bighoof. "The Fluttershy Effect": While heading to a party for Fluttershy, Rainbow Dash moves so fast she ends up in a dystopian future.
9	9	"The Fast and Furriest"	Dave Horwitz	December 5, 2020 (Note: These episodes aired on Treehouse TV on July 19, 2020.)	109
9	9	"Disappearing Act"	Dave Horwitz	December 5, 2020	109
"The Fast and Furriest": Twilight and Rainbow Dash get into a rivalry and enter their pets into the Maplewood Motor Match in order to settle things. "Disappearing Act": Rarity performs in a magic show to entertain the Cutie Mark Crusaders and accidentally makes her friends disappear.
10	10	"Badge of Shame"	Greg Levine	December 5, 2020	110
10	10	"Discord's Peak"	Greg Levine	December 5, 2020	110
"Badge of Shame": To earn her engineering badge Twilight must build a machine. As the Master of Instructions she believes it be a simple task but when she sees how complicated the instructions are, Twilight begins to lose confidence in herself. "Discord's Peak": The Mane Six head to Mt. Volcanope in order to get their next badge. Fluttershy wants Discord to come along but he doesn't have any interest in doing so.
11	11	"A Camping We Will Go"	Greg Levine	December 12, 2020 (Note: These episodes aired on Treehouse TV on July 26, 2020.)	111
11	11	"Campfire Stories"	Dave Horwitz	December 12, 2020	111
"A Camping We Will Go": The girls head out on a camping trip but Rarity is reluctant to give it a try without the comforts of home. "Campfire Stories": When the power goes out at Sugarcube Corner, Pinkie and her friends tell stories to pass the time.
12	12	"Friendship Gems"	Taneka Stotts	December 12, 2020	112
12	12	"Dol-FIN-ale"	Katie Chilson	December 12, 2020	112
"Friendship Gems": While making friendship bracelets, the girls meet Trixie, who has difficulty making friends. Twilight and her friends decide to help her by showing her how to be a good friend. "Dol-FIN-ale": Twilight and her friends meet Finn Tastic and must convince him to go along with their lie of being in a Trail Trotter troop to Fluttershy.
13	13	"Potion Mystery"	Taneka Stotts	December 19, 2020 (Note: These episodes aired on Treehouse TV on August 2, 2020.)	113
13	13	"Sick Day"	Dave Horwitz	December 19, 2020	113
"Potion Mystery": When Twilight discovers somepony sneaks into Sugarcube Corner at night to restock the potions, she becomes determined to catch the culprit in the act. "Sick Day": Rainbow Dash and Rarity must run Sugarcube Corner on their own when all their friends come down with a cold.
14	14	"Meet Potion Nova!"	Whitney Ralls	December 19, 2020	114
14	14	"Pony Surfin' Safari"	Katie Chilson	December 19, 2020	114
"Meet Potion Nova!": On a slow day at Sugarcube Corner Twilight laments how bored she is and misses the times she and her friends used to go on adventures. Suddenly the potion maker, Potion Nova appears before them and asks for their help. "Pony Surfin' Safari": While on vacation at the potion ocean, Potion Nova warns the Mane Six about the Cute Triangle, an area located in the ocean that traps anypony who goes near it. Unfortunately, the girls get stuck in the Cute Triangle when Applejack insists on spending time together as a group.
15	15	"All Bottled Up"	Greg Levine	January 2, 2021 (Note: These episodes aired on Treehouse TV on August 9, 2020.)	115
15	15	"All That Jitters"	Katie Chilson	January 2, 2021	115
"All Bottled Up": After getting into a fight with Owlowliscious, Twilight decides to literally bottle up her problems, resulting in her and Applejack getting trapped in a potion bottle. "All That Jitters": Twilight begins potion making with Potion Nova but her nerves start to get the best of her.
16	16	"I, Cookie"	Taneka Stotts	January 2, 2021	116
16	16	"Keynote Pie"	Dave Horwitz	January 2, 2021	116
"I, Cookie": With no one around at Sugarcube Corner, Pinkie Pie becomes lonely. Using Twilight's Replitron 5000, she creates cookies of her friends to play with. However, to her surprise, the cookies come to life. "Keynote Pie": Pinkie Pie wishes to attract investors for Sugarcube Corner by holding a conference. However, she starts to suffer from stage fright just when she's about to give her speech.
17	17	"Ponies of the Moment"	Dave Horwitz	January 9, 2021 (Note: These episodes aired on Treehouse TV on August 23, 2020.)	117
17	17	"One Click Wonder"	Taneka Stotts	January 9, 2021	117
"Ponies of the Moment": The girls become famous after a video of them goes viral. "One Click Wonder": With their fame gone, the girls try to make another viral video, much to Applejack's dismay.
18	18	"Zound Off"	Greg Levine	January 9, 2021	118
18	18	"Unboxing Day"	Katie Chilson	January 9, 2021	118
"Zound Off": Rainbow Dash wants to download an onomatopoeia app on her tablet but she doesn't have enough space for it. "Unboxing Day": Fluttershy attempts to make an unboxing video but she has trouble opening the box.
19	19	"Don't Look a .GIF Horse in the Mouth"	Katie Chilson	January 16, 2021 (Note: These episodes aired on Treehouse TV on August 30, 2020.)	119
19	19	"The Root of It"	Dave Horwitz	January 16, 2021	119
"Don't Look a .GIF Horse in the Mouth": It's Pinkie Pie's birthday and Applejack has trouble finding a good gift to give her. "The Root of It": Applejack is tired of doing the same things every day and leaves Sugarcube Corner to do something different for a change.
20	20	"The Mysterious Voice"	Taneka Stotts	January 16, 2021	120
20	20	"The 5 Habits of Highly Effective Ponies"	Greg Levine	January 16, 2021	120
"The Mysterious Voice": Twilight, Rainbow Dash, and Applejack hear a strange voice speak to them. "The 5 Habits of Highly Effective Ponies": Fluttershy is trying to help a caterpillar hatch from its cocoon, but she's unsuccessful. Seeking advice from her friends, Fluttershy decides to mimic their behavior in hopes of hatching the cocoon.
21	21	"Game Knight"	Taneka Stotts	January 23, 2021 (Note: These episodes aired on Treehouse TV on September 6, 2020.)	121
21	21	"Director Spike's Mockumentary"	Dave Horwitz	January 23, 2021	121
"Game Knight": Twilight invites her friends over to her house to play a board game she made called Tales of Canterlot. However, the girls find the game to be boring and proceed to make their own rules for it. "Director Spike's Mockumentary": Spike returns from film class and wishes to make a documentary on Sugarcube Corner. The Mane Six are excited to be in a movie but they become nervous when on camera.
22	22	"Whoof-dunnit"	Gillian M. Berrow	January 23, 2021	122
22	22	"Dear Tabby"	Greg Levine	January 23, 2021	122
"Whoof-dunnit": Rarity finds a visor on the ground and becomes a detective to track down its owner. "Dear Tabby": Applejack and Rarity argue over food, and unwilling to apologize, Applejack turns to her favorite advice column for help.
23	23	"Pie Vs. Pie"	Greg Levine	January 30, 2021	123
23	23	"Superb Six"	Taneka Stotts	January 30, 2021	123
"Pie vs Pie": Pinkie Pie gets into a sibling bakeoff with her older brother Octavio Pie. "Superb Six": The Mane Six become the Superb Six and offer lifestyle tips to help Snips and Snails attend the Meet and Gallop.
24	24	"The Debut Taunt"	Dave Horwitz	January 30, 2021 (Note: This episode aired on Treehouse TV on September 13, 2020.)	124
24	24	"Flutterdash"	Gillian M. Berrow	January 30, 2021	124
"The Debut Taunt": Rarity invites her friends over to watch a television show featuring herself in it. However, Rarity becomes depressed when her role in the show is cut. "Flutterdash": The ponies arrive at the Sportacular Spectacular, excited to participate in the events. But when Rainbow Dash is injured before a buckball game, she asks Fluttershy to disguise herself as Rainbow Dash to take her place.
25	25	"The Rarity Report"	Taneka Stotts	February 6, 2021	125
25	25	"The Great Divide"	Dave Horwitz	February 6, 2021	125
"The Rarity Report": Rarity doesn't have any interest in playing sports so her friends try to find an event suited for her. "The Great Divide": When they are about to play a game of buckball, the girls try to get together on the same team.
26	26	"The Great Collide"	Greg Levine	February 6, 2021	126
26	26	"Sportacular Spectacular Musical Musak-ular"	Gillian M. Berrow	February 6, 2021	126
"The Great Collide": Continuing from the last episode, the Mane Six reluctantly face off against one another. "Sportacular Spectacular Musical Musak-ular": Touched by the girls' friendship Bulk Biceps goes to reconnect with an old friend, leaving the girls in charge of hosting the closing ceremonies for the Sportacular Spectacular.

=== Season 2 (2021) ===
No. overall	No. in season	Title	Written by	Original release date	Prod. code
27	1	"Cute Impact"	Taneka Stotts	April 10, 2021 (Note: This episode aired on Tiny Pop in the UK on April 2, 2021.)	201
27	1	"The Crystal Capturing Contraption"	Greg Levine	April 10, 2021	201
"Cute Impact": Twilight makes a shocking discovery when she sees a strange pink dot through her telescope. But instead of telling her friends, she decides to handle this situation on her own. "The Crystal Capturing Contraption": Fluttershy interviews her friends about the coming Cosmic Cotton Candy Comet, while Pinkie Pie tries to collect the cosmic crystals needed for her treats. But, she needs Fluttershy's help.
28	2	"The Comet Section"	Josh Riley Brown	April 10, 2021	202
28	2	"Cotton Candy-Colored Glasses"	Dave Horwitz	April 10, 2021	202
"The Comet Section": Rarity decides to throw a viewing party for all of Ponyville to watch the Cosmic Cotton Candy Comet. "Cotton Candy-Colored Glasses": Rainbow decides to sell merchandise to commemorate the Cosmic Cotton Candy Comet, but unfortunately for her, another pony gets the same idea as her.
29	3	"Close Encounters of the Balloon Kind"	Greg Levine	April 17, 2021	TBA
29	3	"The Tiara of Truth"	Gillian M. Berrow	April 17, 2021	TBA
"Close Encounters of the Balloon Kind": When a mysterious balloon lands in Ponyville, the Mane Six try to figure out what it is and what it could be. "The Tiara of Truth": When Pinkie Pie's friends except Rarity are late to a certain cupcake testing, she uses a magical tiara (given to her by Fluttershy) to find out the real reason why they couldn't come.
30	4	"Terrorarium"	Taneka Stotts	April 17, 2021	TBA
30	4	"Bubble Trouble"	Dave Horwitz	April 17, 2021	TBA
"Terrorarium": Applejack adopts a magical flower friend as her pet, which winds up growing out of control when he eats the entire apple crop. "Bubble Trouble": Spike and the Mane Six find a bubble wand and have fun with it. But, things take a turn for the worse pretty quick when they get stuck.
31	5	"Time After Time Capsule"	Gillian M. Berrow	April 24, 2021	205
31	5	"The Great Cowgirl Hat Robbery"	Greg Levine	April 24, 2021	205
"Time After Time Capsule": When the Mane Six decide to make a time capsule to look back fondly on their time in the future, Fluttershy struggles to find the perfect item to add to it. "The Great Cowgirl Hat Robbery": Rarity and Applejack get transported to Old Equestria, and have to prove themselves worthy to get Applejack's cowgirl hat back in order to return to their time.
32	6	"Planet of the Apps"	Taneka Stotts	April 24, 2021	TBA
32	6	"Back to the Present"	Dave Horwitz	April 24, 2021	TBA
"Planet of the Apps": When Twilight and Rainbow Dash are transported to a futuristic-looking Ponyville, they have to save Fluttershy from Mecha-Ponies! "Back to the Present": The Mane Six are reunited and return to their own time, only to discover that Sugarcube Corner is now a salad restaurant.
33	7	"Magical Mare-story Tour"	Julia Prescott	May 1, 2021	207
33	7	"Life of Pie"	Taneka Stotts	May 1, 2021	207
"Magical Mare-story Tour": Continuing from the previous episode, after the Wild Siders have crossed over into Ponyville, the Mane Six show them around the town. "Life of Pie": Lightning Chill watches Pinkie Pie as her baking apprentice for the day, but the two clash over how they like their styles.
34	8	"The Rarest of Occasions"	Dave Horwitz	May 1, 2021	208
34	8	"Portal Combat"	Greg Levine	May 1, 2021	208
"The Rarest of Occasions": Rarity prepares herself for the premiere of her 100th livestream episode of her show, with Sugar Snap’s help. "Portal Combat": When the portal between the Wild Siders’ dimension and Ponyville close, Rainbow Dash is stuck in the middle of the portal’s energy!
35	9	"What Goes Updo"	Julia Prescott	May 8, 2021	209
35	9	"Communication Shakedown"	Dave Horwitz	May 8, 2021	209
"What Goes Updo": The Mane Six get a mane makeover at Princess Cadance's Mane Styling booth. But when Rarity arrives late, the booth is already closed, and she feels left out and envious. "Communication Shakedown": When Pinkie suggests splitting up to do separate things and synchronizing with text messages, the other ponies take her texts the wrong way.
36	10	"Lolly-Pop"	Greg Levine	May 8, 2021	210
36	10	"Little Miss Fortune"	Taneka Stotts	May 8, 2021	210
"Lolly-Pop": Fluttershy decides to pursue her childhood dream of being a clown. However, Applejack has a fear of clowns. "Little Miss Fortune": When a fortune-telling machine makes the ponies' fortunes come true, Rainbow Dash fears that her worst one will happen and decides to join a traveling circus to "stay in motion."
37	11	"Playwright or Wrong"	Julia Prescott	May 15, 2021	211
37	11	"The Shows Must Go On"	Taneka Stotts	May 15, 2021	211
"Playwright or Wrong": The Mane Six decide to celebrate Ponyville Play Day by letting the Wild Siders decide to pitch their ideas on which play they should do. "The Shows Must Go On": When a theater director casts Rarity in a stage play on the same night The Mane Six's play is on, she must choose between fame or friends.
38	12	"The De-stress Ball"	Greg Levine	May 15, 2021	212
38	12	"Mad Props"	Dave Horwitz	May 15, 2021	212
"The De-stress Ball": Applejack catches stage fright on the night of their play, and her friends try to help her relax, and relieve herself of the stress. "Mad Props": On the night of the play, the Mane Six's props begin running amok, and they try to go along with it as if it were nothing.
39	13	"Magic Is Ahoof"	Julia Prescott	May 22, 2021	213
39	13	"Journey to the Center of the 'cord"	Dave Horwitz	May 22, 2021	213
"Magic Is Ahoof": The magic in Ponyville has reached its peak, and Rarity and Pinkie Pie have to find out why. "Journey to the Center of the 'cord": When Discord makes off with their cosmic wishes, the Mane Six decide to go into his head to find out his intentions with them.
40	14	"One Last Wish"	Greg Levine	May 22, 2021	214
40	14	"Wild Heart Beats"	Taneka Stotts	May 22, 2021	214
"One Last Wish": Continuing from the previous episode, the Mane Six decide to throw Discord his first-ever birthday party to get him to use his last wish to save Ponyville. "Wild Heart Beats": With chaos magic still around and Ponyville and the Wild Side about to collide, the Mane Six and Wild Siders must team up to set things right.

== My Little Pony: Stop Motion Shorts (2020) ==
All of the shorts were directed by Emily Thompson and written by Celina Frenn.

No.	Title	Length	Original release date	US viewers (millions)
1	"Potion Party"	1:57	January 24, 2020	2.12
While Twilight Sparkle is busy with her potion testing, little does she know that Pinkie Pie is trying them out for herself, only to end up with bizarre consequences. Can Twilight return her back to normal?
2	"Cake Off"	2:04	January 31, 2020	4.16
Rainbow Dash and Pinkie Pie compete in a baking contest to see who can create the best cake ever. At first, it looks like a dead heat, but Rainbow Dash takes things to the extreme. In turn, Pinkie Pie builds her cake a bit higher too; but as she puts on the final topping, she falls onto her own creation, making her upset. Rainbow Dash feels guilty about Pinkie's defeat, so she decides to fall on her cake too, and the two laugh despite not winning the bake-off.
3	"Fashion Failure"	2:04	February 7, 2020	0.53
Ponyville is putting on a fashion show this week, and Pinkie Pie and Rainbow Dash have volunteered to be Rarity's models. But with minutes to go before going onstage, Rarity quickly dresses her two models in various fabric and material. Pinkie is an easy task straight away, but there's a tough decision with Rainbow Dash, who has a different style of fashion. As the show gets underway, the audience grows weary and Rainbow Dash takes matters into her own hooves by dressing in a novelty made-up outfit to Rarity's shock. However, as the two models show off their display, to Rarity's surprise the audience applaud the results and the fashion show is a success.
4	"Valentine's Day Card"	1:56	February 14, 2020	0.57
Pinkie Pie visits Fluttershy for Hearts and Hooves Day, but the latter goes to make them both a cup of tea. In the meanwhile, Pinkie is overjoyed when she sees a crafting box. Feeling enthusiastic, she gets to work making her friend something special; unfortunately, Fluttershy hears the commotion and investigates. But upon return, it is revealed to Fluttershy's amazement that Pinkie has made the both of them a "Hearts and Hooves Day" card.
5	"Pillow Fight"	1:55	February 21, 2020	0.51
Rainbow Dash is tired of flying all day clearing the sky, so she "accidentally" decides to take a nap on Pinkie's pillow tower! This triggers an intense pillow fight between the two; however, one pillow inadvertently hits Applejack, who joins in the fun. Pinkie then strikes the final blow as she fires a huge stack of pillows from her party cannon, knocking out both Rainbow Dash and Applejack to sleep. Seeing this, Pinkie decides to join the two and falls asleep on the pillow bed.
6	"Ice & Slice"	1:59	February 28, 2020	0.24
It's snow day! Pinkie Pie is enjoying prancing around in the snow, but little does she know that Rainbow Dash is planning a sneaky but "sweet" surprise in store for her...! Pinkie sees Rainbow's cake on an icy pond, tries to reach it but ends up falling down because of the slippery surface. But as the old saying goes: "if at first you don't succeed, try, try again!" Pinkie does so, but repeatedly ends up landing in the snowy bank. Seeing Pinkie's unfortunate attempts, Rainbow decides to personally bring her the cake, but accidentally drops it on her face. They laugh it off in the end.
7	"Snow Pony Contest"	2:06	March 6, 2020	0.75
Rarity and Rainbow Dash compete in a contest for creating the best "snowpony" they can make. At first, Rarity's creations are exceptionally professional, while Rainbow's are a bit basic. However, while Rarity creates a resemblance of an alicorn, Rainbow Dash quickly creates the full lineup of the Mane Six. The trophy is almost awarded to Rarity, but she declares her opponent the winner for her replication of their friends. They celebrate by building snowpony versions of themselves.
8	"Pie Assembly Line"	2:10	March 13, 2020	0.63
Applejack demonstrates to Pinkie Pie and Rainbow Dash her farm's brand-new pie-making machine by creating an apple pie in three simple steps; make the base, fill with sauce, put on the casing and voilà! Pinkie and Rainbow decide to try it out by helping her with the mechanism. All is going well, until a sneaky Rainbow Dash turns up the speed to maximum power. Unbeknownst to her, Pinkie Pie and Applejack find it hard to keep up with how fast the pies are going, which eventually causes a mushy pileup. Seeing this, Rainbow turns off the machine and looking innocent. Applejack is unhappy with her and throws a pie at her, but they all have fun overall.
9	"Snowball Fight"	2:01	March 20, 2020	0.55
Another snow day means one thing: snowball fight! Rainbow Dash loves throwing snowballs, though when her friends are involved, things can escalate. So, the Mane 6 engage in an epic battle of snowy proportions, and have a super fun time!
10	"Magician Pinkie Pie"	2:00	March 27, 2020	0.19
Pinkie Pie puts on a magic act, where she somehow has the ability to levitate both herself and other objects.
11	"Pinkie Pie Wants to Play!"	2:03	April 3, 2020	0.23
Pinkie wants Twilight to dance with her, but she's too busy focusing on her studies.
12	"Pinkie Pie vs. the Flowers"	1:57	April 12, 2020	0.19
Pinkie Pie loves flowers. When she sees a huge flower display set up by Twilight Sparkle, Applejack and Rainbow Dash, she can't help herself and charges into it, covering her friends in a huge flower pile. When Pinkie looks at them, she thinks they're ghosts and starts to get scared. The three reveal themselves and begin to laugh with Pinkie joining them.
13	"Rarity's Paintful Pony Portrait"	2:01	April 17, 2020	0.21
Rarity thinks she can achieve fame as a painter.
14	"Rainy Day Puddle Play"	1:59	April 24, 2020	0.47
Fluttershy plays in the puddles during a rainstorm, but then gets sick.
15	"Fluttershy's Hiccups"	1:55	May 1, 2020	0.22
Applejack helps Fluttershy cure her hiccups.
16	"Gem of a Problem"	1:54	May 8, 2020	1.11
Rarity uses her magic ability to dig for gems, but then her magic starts malfunctioning.
17	"Dance Dance"	1:58	May 15, 2020	0.31
Fluttershy and Rainbow Dash have a dance contest.
18	"Volleyball Game Between Rainbow Dash and Applejack"	2:01	May 20, 2020	0.13
Rainbow Dash and Applejack play an intense game of volleyball, with Fluttershy as the referee.
19	"Carving Contest"	2:05	May 29, 2020	0.51
Applejack holds a contest wherein the ponies build the best wooden structure.
20	"The Great Race"	2:05	June 5, 2020	0.24
Princess Celestia presides over a foot race between Rainbow Dash, Twilight, and Fluttershy.
21	"Book Filled Adventure"	2:21	June 11, 2020	0.35
Twilight magically enters a library book and explores the book's live-action pictures.
22	"Hat in the Way"	1:56	June 16, 2020	1.45
All six ponies gather together in a movie theater. The ending reveals their film as My Little Pony: Pony Life.

== See also ==
- List of My Little Pony: Friendship Is Magic episodes
