= Good Girls Don't (TV series) =

- Also known as: My Roommate Is a Big Fat Slut
- Genre: Sitcom
- Created by: Claudia Lonow
- Written by: Nancy Cohen; Emily Cutler; Claudia Lonow
- Directed by: Timothy Busfield
- Starring: Bree Turner; Joy Gohring; Kevin Christy; Brent King; Nichole Hiltz
- Theme music composer: Ralph Churchwell; Eric Jackson
- Composer: Gary Stockdale
- Country of origin: United States
- Original language: English
- No. of seasons: 1
- No. of episodes: 8

Production
- Executive producers: Marcy Carsey; Claudia Lonow; Caryn Mandabach; Joe Voci; Tom Werner
- Camera setup: Single-camera
- Running time: 30 minutes
- Production companies: Hot Lava Girl Productions; Carsey-Werner-Mandabach

Original release
- Network: Oxygen
- Release: June 4 – August 1, 2004

Good Girls Don't is an American sitcom created by Claudia Lonow and produced by Carsey-Werner-Mandabach which stars Bree Turner and Joy Gohring. Eight episodes of the series were aired on Oxygen in 2004.

== Cast ==
- Bree Turner as Marjorie
- Joy Gohring as Jane
- Kevin Christy as Ben
- Brent King as Davis
- Nichole Hiltz as Lizzie
