= Make Some Noise (TV series) =

Improvisational game show on Dropout

- Genre: Improvisational comedy; Panel show
- Created by: Sam Reich
- Written by: Elaine Carroll; Sam Reich
- Directed by: Sam Geer; Kevin Stiller
- Presented by: Sam Reich
- Theme music composer: Radio Night (opening); Martin Landström (ending)
- Opening theme: "Follow Every Move"
- Ending theme: "Santa Caterina Sunday"
- Composer: TJ Dumser
- Country of origin: United States
- Original language: English
- No. of seasons: 5
- No. of episodes: 67

Production
- Executive producers: David Cyr Kerns; Brennan Lee Mulligan; Zac Oyama; Sam Reich; Paul Robalino; Josh Ruben
- Cinematography: Kevin Stiller
- Editor: Eve Hinz
- Camera setup: Multi-camera
- Running time: 30 minutes
- Production company: Dropout

Original release
- Network: Dropout
- Release: June 13, 2022 – present

Make Some Noise is an American improvisational comedy game show on Dropout, created and hosted by Sam Reich.

The show is a spin-off of the Dropout game show Game Changer, which featured four episodes with the "Noise Boys" format from 2019 to 2021, with the first titled "Make Some Noise". As a separate show, Make Some Noise premiered on June 13, 2022, and has released four seasons. The fifth season premiered on October 5, 2026.

Brennan Lee Mulligan, Zac Oyama, and Josh Ruben — the original participants on the Game Changer episodes, collectively nicknamed the "Noise Boys" — are executive producers, and also appear in the first and last episode of every season; other episodes feature them alongside a rotation of Dropout regulars and special guests, such as Wayne Brady, Pete Holmes, and Ben Schwartz.

== Format ==
In each episode, three comedians compete as players, improvising scenes based on prompts from Reich. The players are then awarded "points", though the amounts given are jokes and no numbers are actually tracked. The game is split into three rounds: in the first round, the players each respond to individual prompts; in the second round, the players fulfill the prompts in groups of two; in the third and final round, all three players improvise each scene together. A minigame takes place between each round, with the players competing in a specific challenge, such as imitating a specific sound using a prop or coming up with a name for something presented on screen. At the end of each episode, Reich declares a winner, awarding them a "golden ear" trophy.

Some episodes feature alternate formats, such as all prompts being based around impressions. One of these formats is the musically themed "Karaoke Night", which was introduced in the second season, based on the Game Changer episode of the same name. In "Karaoke Night" episodes, players choose a song title and musical artist from a large binder and must improvise a song in the style of the artist provided, accompanied by keyboardist Aaron Wilson. The rounds work the same way as the main game: the first round being solos, the second round being duets, and all three players singing together in the final round.

The final episode of each season is a "Cut for Time" special, consisting of scenes and prompts that were omitted from previous episodes for reasons such as quality, good taste, or episode length.

== Episodes ==
=== Series overview ===
Season	Episodes	Originally released	
Season	Episodes	First released	Last released
1	11	June 13, 2022	October 31, 2022
2	16	June 5, 2023	January 15, 2024
3	20	June 24, 2024	March 17, 2025
4	16	October 13, 2025	May 11, 2026
5	15	October 5, 2026	TBA

=== Season 1 (2022) ===
No. overall	No. in season	Title	Contestants	Original release date
1	1	"HBO's A Game of Rock Paper Scissors"	Josh Ruben, Zac Oyama, Brennan Lee Mulligan	June 13, 2022
2	2	"Shakespeare's 'Dude, Where's My Car?'"	Ross Bryant, Jacquis Neal, Anna Garcia	June 27, 2022
3	3	"A Monster Truck Voiceover for a Peaceful Sunday"	Zac Oyama, Jacob Wysocki, Kimia Behpoornia	July 11, 2022
4	4	"The Cut 'Plunger's Song' from Beauty and the Beast"	Brennan Lee Mulligan, Jess McKenna, Andy Bustillos	July 25, 2022
5	5	"Jennifer Coolidge the Air Traffic Controller"	Lisa Gilroy, Mary Elizabeth Kelly, Frank Garcia-Hejl	August 8, 2022
An impressions-themed episode.
6	6	"The Hostage Negotiator Knows the Hostage Taker from Way Back"	Zac Oyama, Jacob Wysocki, Vic Michaelis	August 22, 2022
7	7	"A Villain and Their Real Estate Agent Tour Volcano Lairs"	SungWon Cho, Caitlin Reilly, Brian David Gilbert	September 5, 2022
8	8	"Brennan's Wario, Wennan Wee Wulligan"	Brennan Lee Mulligan, Ruha Taslimi, Oscar Montoya	September 19, 2022
9	9	"Things Jimmy Stewart Would Give to Mary in Addition to the Moon"	Allie Jennings, Isabella Roland, Erin Dellorso	October 3, 2022
10	10	"The Long Awaited Meeting Between Times New Roman and Comic Sans"	Josh Ruben, Zac Oyama, Brennan Lee Mulligan	October 17, 2022
11	11	"Cut For Time (Season 1)"	N/A	October 31, 2022
A collection of prompts from the entire season that were cut from the episodes for time.

=== Season 2 (2023–2024) ===
No. overall	No. in season	Title	Contestants	Original release date
12	1	"100,000 Batmans"	Josh Ruben, Zac Oyama, Brennan Lee Mulligan	June 5, 2023
Dropout regular Grant O'Brien appears in a mini game where the contestants have to try to get him to make a sex joke.
13	2	"Two Two-Kids-in-a-Trenchcoat on a Date"	Jess McKenna, Geoff Ross, Jeremy Culhane	June 19, 2023
14	3	"Shakespeare's 'Two Gentlemen of Coronavirus'"	Brennan Lee Mulligan, Ross Bryant, Matt Apodaca	July 3, 2023
15	4	"Thinking Every Restaurant Has a Secret Menu"	Nick Mandernach, Vic Michaelis, Jiavani	July 17, 2023
16	5	"A Track Announcer Who's Clearly Attracted to One of the Horses"	Josh Ruben, Anna Garcia, Isabella Roland	July 31, 2023
17	6	""Not Really My Thing" By Harry Styles"	Rashawn Nadine Scott, Ross Bryant, Wayne Brady	August 14, 2023
The first episode to use the Karaoke Night format.
18	7	"Adam and Eve Broach an Open Relationship"	Zac Oyama, Jacob Wysocki, Vic Michaelis	August 28, 2023
19	8	"The Speech MLK Really Wanted to Give Instead of 'I Have a Dream'"	Jacquis Neal, Matt Apodaca, Carl Tart	September 11, 2023
20	9	"The Wicked Switch of the West"	Isabella Roland, Brennan Lee Mulligan, Erika Ishii	September 25, 2023
21	10	"Both Sides of a Dolphin Argument"	Kurt Maloney, Jacob Wysocki, Lauren Pritchard	October 9, 2023
22	11	"What is Robin Williams Even Talking About?"	Josh Ruben, Katia Kvinge, Cameron Logsdon	October 23, 2023
An impressions-themed episode.
23	12	"How Not to Survive a Bear Encounter"	Kimia Behpoornia, Jacob Wysocki, Lou Wilson	November 6, 2023
24	13	"A Love Is Blind Contestant Is Secretly a Horse"	Zac Oyama, Lisa Gilroy, Jacquis Neal	November 20, 2023
25	14	""Yes And" By Ed Sheeran and Kelly Clarkson"	Jess McKenna, Zeke Nicholson, Zach Reino	December 4, 2023
A Karaoke Night episode.
26	15	"Two Grizzled Fishermen Compare Scar Stories"	Josh Ruben, Zac Oyama, Brennan Lee Mulligan	December 18, 2023
27	16	"Make Some Noise Season 2: Cut For Time"	N/A	January 15, 2024
A collection of prompts from the entire season that were cut from the episodes for time.

=== Season 3 (2024–2025) ===
This season was initially announced as having 20 episodes, not counting the Cut for Time special; however, audio issues affected this season's karaoke episode featuring Rachel Bloom, forcing it to be cut.

No. overall	No. in season	Title	Contestants	Original release date
28	1	"A Cutscene in a Video Game That's Glitching Out"	Josh Ruben, Zac Oyama, Brennan Lee Mulligan	June 24, 2024
29	2	"An Open-Heart Surgeon with the Attitude of a Cool Hairdresser"	Jiavani, Vic Michaelis, Talia Tabin	July 8, 2024
30	3	"Uber but on Horseback"	Brennan Lee Mulligan, Jacob Wysocki, Lou Wilson	July 22, 2024
31	4	"Willy Wonka's Lawyer's Opening Statement"	Ross Bryant, Paul F. Tompkins, Chris Grace	August 5, 2024
32	5	"A Celebrity's Unflattering Wax Figure Reveal"	Josh Ruben, Caitlin Reilly, Pete Holmes	August 19, 2024
33	6	"Sober You Discusses Last Night's Receipts with Drunk You"	Nick Mandernach, Lauren Pritchard, Sarah Claspell	September 2, 2024
34	7	"A Bear Who Just Hibernated Through Like 250 Commitments"	Ify Nwadiwe, Carl Tart, Zeke Nicholson	September 16, 2024
35	8	"A Horny Chain Text Message for Arbor Day"	Ross Bryant, Jess McKenna, Geoff Ross	September 30, 2024
36	9	"A Kid Who's Definitely the Reason Their Parents Got Divorced"	Jeremy Culhane, Kimia Behpoornia, Kurt Maloney	October 14, 2024
Dropout regular Jacob Wysocki appears in the final minigame, "Back to Basics", to judge the players' impressions of him. Wysocki participates with the players in the final round's improvisational prompts.
37	10	"A Couple Calls for the Check but Doesn't Know the Hand Motion"	Josh Ruben, Anna Garcia, Hannah Pilkes	October 28, 2024
38	11	"The One Toxic Person in Every Improv 101 Class"	Isabella Roland, Brennan Lee Mulligan, Erika Ishii	November 11, 2024
39	12	"A Basketball Player's Far Too Elaborate Free Throw Routine"	Jess McKenna, Ben Schwartz, Ryan Gaul	November 25, 2024
40	13	"An Obituary for Someone Who Definitely Faked Their Own Death"	Vic Michaelis, Mimi von Schack, Maame-Yaa Aforo	December 9, 2024
Pomona College music professor Malachai Komanoff Bandy appears as a special guest for the "Make it Sing" minigame, where the players imitate a melody he plays on the hurdy-gurdy.
41	14	"Two 'Wife Guys' Try to Out 'Wife Guy' Each Other"	Zac Oyama, Devin Field, Victoria Longwell	December 23, 2024
Malachai Komanoff Bandy returns as a special guest in the "Make it Sing" minigame, where the players imitate his crumhorn solo.
42	15	"This Dream Is Too Messed Up Even for Freddy Krueger"	Jeremy Culhane, Angela Giarratana, Corin Wells	January 6, 2025
43	16	"The Black Version of 'Romeo & Juliet'"	Jacquis Neal, Bri Giger, Echo Kellum	January 20, 2025
44	17	"A Singing Telegram Serving You for Property Encroachment"	Jess McKenna, Anna Garcia, D.J. Mausner	February 3, 2025
45	18	"A Date That Is Only Red Flags"	Vic Michaelis, Jacob Wysocki, Ally Beardsley	February 17, 2025
Natalie Garcia, owner of a pet adoption center, appears as a special guest in the "Name That Dog" minigame, where the players must provide nicknames to 6 of her rescue dogs.
46	19	"A Takedown of Billionaires Rihanna, Beyoncé, and Oprah"	Josh Ruben, Zac Oyama, Brennan Lee Mulligan	March 3, 2025
Nathan Barnatt appears in his "Dad" character during a minigame, performing several dances the players must name. Dropout regular Grant O'Brien appears in the final minigame, "Back to Basics", to judge the players' impressions of him. O'Brien participates with the players in the final round's improvisational prompts.
47	20	"Make Some Noise Season 3: Cut For Time"	N/A	March 17, 2025
A collection of prompts from the entire season that were cut from the episodes for time.

=== Season 4 (2025–2026) ===
No. overall	No. in season	Title	Contestants	Original release date
48	1	"The Noise Boys Ride Again"	Josh Ruben, Zac Oyama, Brennan Lee Mulligan	October 13, 2025
49	2	"Lou, Ross, and Jiavani Drink Your Milkshake"	Lou Wilson, Ross Bryant, Jiavani	October 27, 2025
50	3	"The Sneaky Girl Shuffle"	Angela Giarratana, Lisa Gilroy, Isabella Roland	November 10, 2025
51	4	"Zunk, Junk, and Dunk"	Zac Oyama, Jacob Wysocki, Devin Field	November 24, 2025
52	5	"Caitlin, Nick, and Geoff Take You to Church"	Caitlin Reilly, Nick Mandernach, Geoff Ross	December 8, 2025
53	6	"Josh, Anna, and Jiavani Make a Day Rate"	Josh Ruben, Anna Garcia, Jiavani	December 22, 2025
54	7	"Ross, Echo, and Corin Try to Recruit You"	Ross Bryant, Echo Kellum, Corin Wells	January 5, 2026
55	8	"Jacob, Kurt, and Angela Have Fun with Filters"	Jacob Wysocki, Kurt Maloney, Angela Giarratana	January 19, 2026
56	9	"Different Language Office"	Zach Reino, Jess McKenna, Paul F. Tompkins	February 2, 2026
Comedian Chris Grace appears in the final minigame, "Milkman Paperboy", to provide a fourth player. Grace participates with the players in the final round's improvisational prompts.
57	10	"Anna, Geoff, and Jeremy Act Out Kids' Prompts"	Anna Garcia, Geoff Ross, Jeremy Culhane	February 16, 2026
58	11	"Ally, Brennan, and Talia Try to Get Through Lunch"	Ally Beardsley, Brennan Lee Mulligan, Talia Tabin	March 2, 2026
Dropout regular Jacob Wysocki appears in the final minigame, "No Nonsense", to provide a fourth player. Wysocki participates with the players in the final round's improvisational prompts.
59	12	"Ben, Lisa, and Colton Have a Party"	Ben Schwartz, Lisa Gilroy, Colton Dunn	March 16, 2026
Series regular Josh Ruben appears in the final minigame, "Choose your Character", to provide a fourth player. Ruben participates with the players in the final round's improvisational prompts.
60	13	"Jacob, Kimia, and Jeremy Impersonate Each Other"	Jacob Wysocki, Kimia Behpoornia, Jeremy Culhane	March 30, 2026
61	14	"Eat an Animal Before It Eats You Show"	Jiavani, Ross Bryant, Jess McKenna	April 13, 2026
Comedian Rashawn Nadine Scott appears in the final minigame, "Milkman Paperboy", to provide a fourth player. Scott participates with the players in the final round's improvisational prompts.
62	15	"The Noise Boys Hype Each Other Up"	Josh Ruben, Zac Oyama, Brennan Lee Mulligan	April 27, 2026
63	16	"Make Some Noise Season 4: Cut For Time"	N/A	May 11, 2026
A collection of prompts from the entire season that were cut from the episodes for time.

=== Season 5 (2026) ===
No. overall	No. in season	Title	Contestants	Original release date
64	1	"The Noise Boys Make One Noise"	Josh Ruben, Zac Oyama, Brennan Lee Mulligan	October 5, 2026
65	2	"Jacob, Jess, and Carl Are Sooooo Close to Touching"	Jacob Wysocki, Jess McKenna, Carl Tart	October 19, 2026
66	3	"Rekha, Lily, Jordan, and Sam's 1x1 Pants"	Rekha Shankar, Lily Du, Jordan Myrick	November 2, 2026
67	4	"Pete, Lisa, and Paul Roast Sam A Lot"	Pete Holmes, Lisa Gilroy, Paul F. Tompkins	November 16, 2026

== Reception ==
Describing the show's popularity in late 2023, Dropout CEO and show host Sam Reich said, "Make Some Noise has brought more folks into Dropout than just about any other show on the platform."
