= Isabella Roland =

American actress and comedian (born 1994)

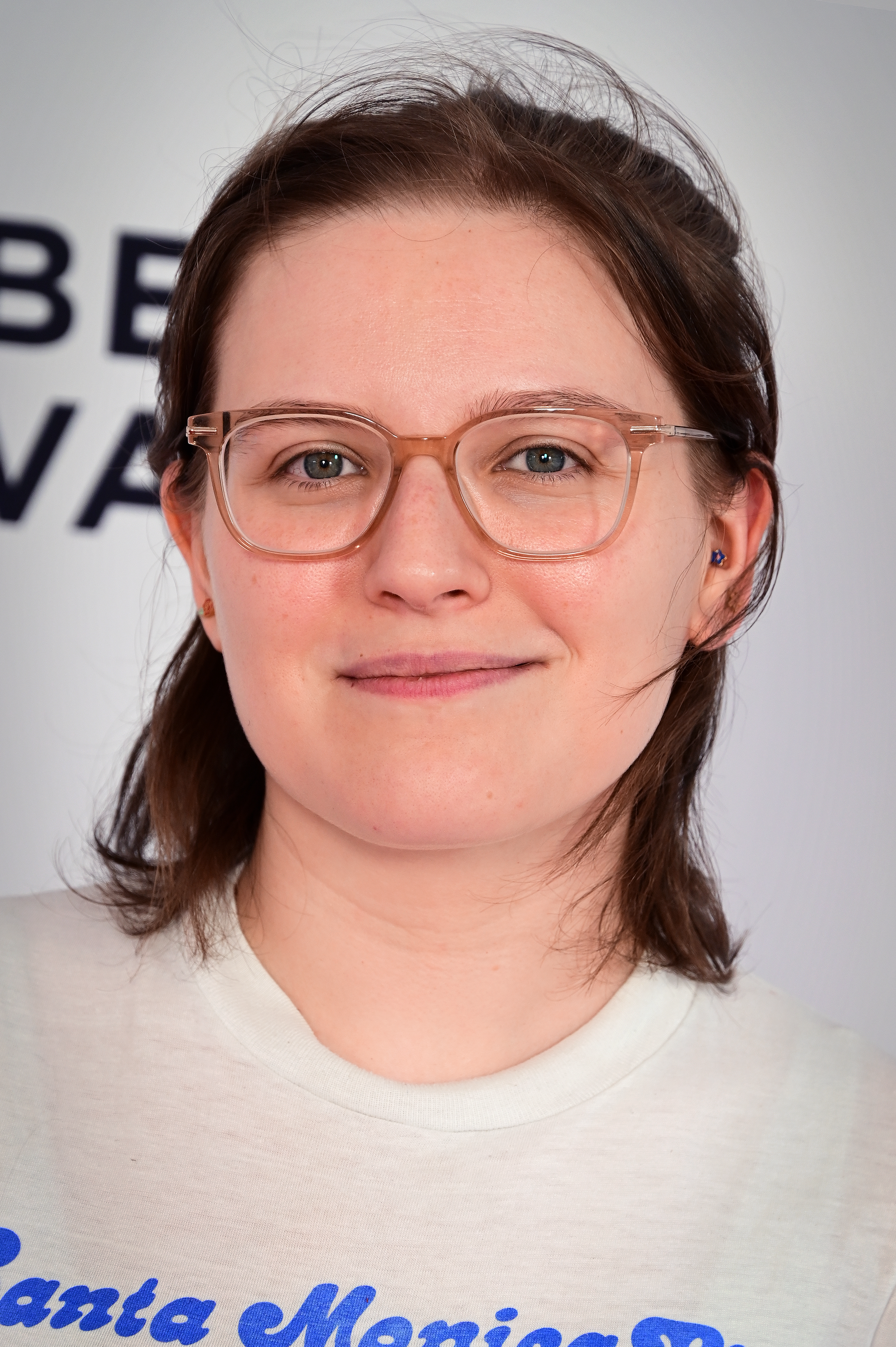
- Roland in 2026
- Born: Isabella Roland; September 24, 1994 (age 31)
- Education: Sarah Lawrence College
- Occupations: Actress; comedian; screenwriter
- Years active: 2017–present
- Spouse: Brennan Lee Mulligan (m. 2023)
- Children: 2
- Mother: Claudia Lonow
- Relatives: JoAnne Astrow (grandmother); Mark Lonow (step-grandfather)
- Website: www.isabellaroland.com

Isabella "Izzy" Roland (born September 24, 1994) is an American actress and comedian. She is known for her appearances on Dropout shows such as Game Changer and Dimension 20.

== Early life ==
Roland grew up in West Hollywood, California, the daughter of actress and comedian Claudia Lonow. When she was two, she and her mother moved into the same household as her grandmother, the comedian and talent manager JoAnne Astrow, and her step-grandfather, the actor and comedy club owner Mark Lonow. The living arrangement inspired her mother's show How to Live with Your Parents (For the Rest of Your Life).

Roland trained at the Lee Strasberg Theatre and Film Institute and graduated from the Los Angeles County High School for the Arts. She then attended Sarah Lawrence College in New York, where she graduated with concentrations in history, French, and theater in 2016. While in college, she performed with the Lampoon improvisational comedy troupe.

== Career ==
In 2018, Roland played the main character Jess, a gender non-conforming student, in the Facebook Watch teen drama series Turnt. In 2021, she began playing the recurring character Carla, a writer for the school comedy magazine, on the HBO Max teen comedy series The Sex Lives of College Girls.

Roland has appeared on Dropout shows since 2019, when she made a cameo from backstage in Game Changer's series premiere. In addition to other appearances, she has since played in several campaigns of the Dropout actual play series Dimension 20 and competed on various episodes of Game Changer and its spinoff Make Some Noise. In 2024, she filmed Never Stop Blowing Up, an action-themed campaign for Dimension 20, while eight months pregnant. Later that year, she and her husband, Brennan Lee Mulligan, created the improv comedy special Bigger for Dropout.

Roland wrote and starred in D(e)ad, a dark comedy film released in 2025, in which she plays a young woman, Tillie, whose father's ghost haunts the rest of her family. The independent and crowdfunded production was directed by Roland's mother, Claudia Lonow, and featured other members of her family in the main cast.

== Personal life ==
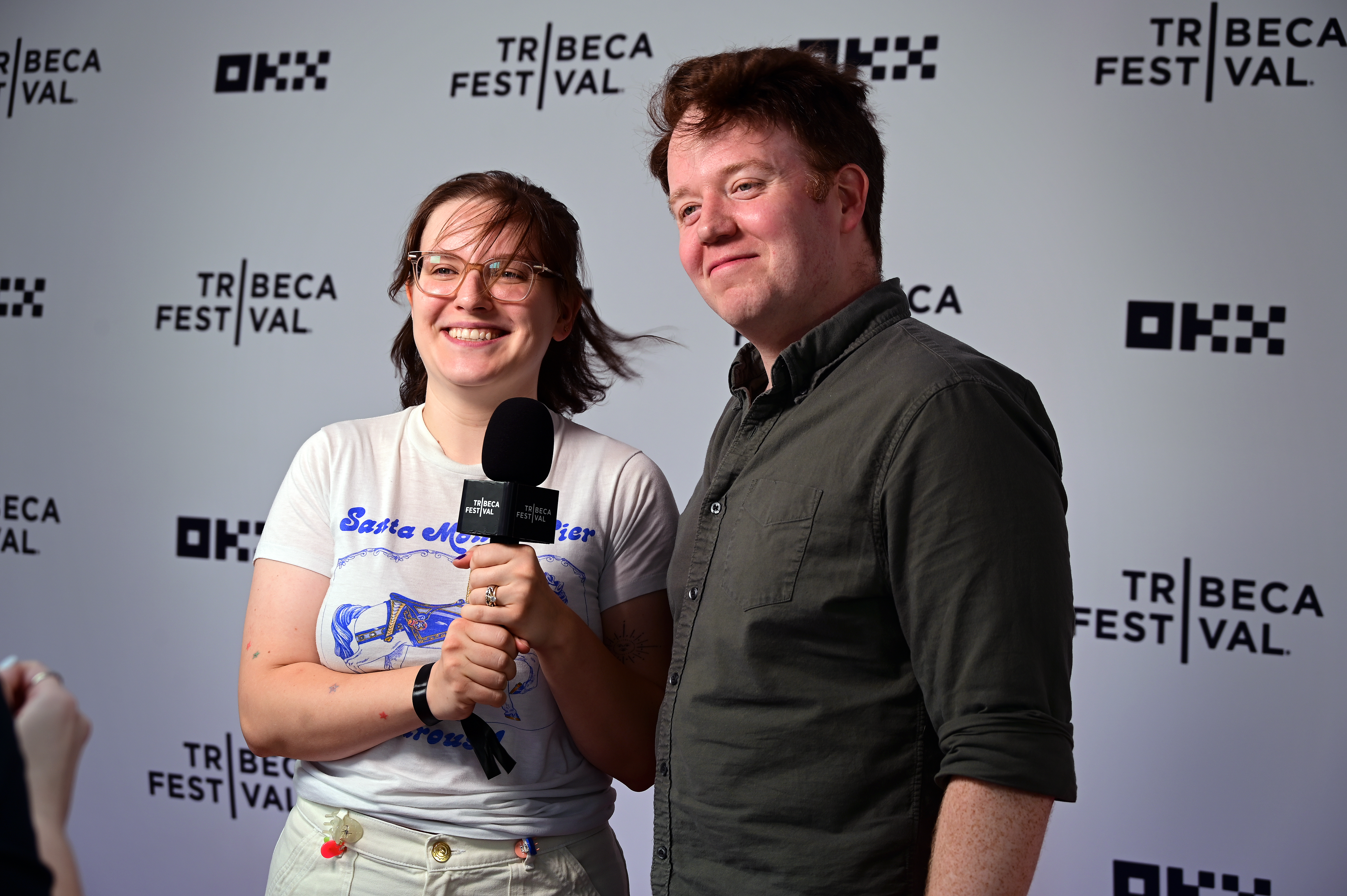
Roland and Brennan Lee Mulligan at the 2026 Tribeca Festival

Roland met her husband, fellow comedian Brennan Lee Mulligan, through improv theater in 2017. The couple married on April 1, 2023. They have two daughters, born in 2024 and 2026.
