= Mark Lonow =

American actor and comedy club owner (born 1944)

- Born: May 11, 1944 (age 82); Brighton Beach, New York City, U.S.
- Occupations: Actor; comedian; producer; comedy club owner
- Spouse: JoAnne Astrow (m. 1969)
- Relatives: Claudia Lonow (stepdaughter); Isabella Roland (step-granddaughter); Yakov Sverdlov (great-uncle)

Mark Lonow (born May 11, 1944) is an American actor, comedian, producer, and comedy club owner. He previously co-owned the Improv comedy club franchise with Budd Friedman.

== Early life ==
Lonow was born into a Jewish family of Russian descent in Brighton Beach, a neighborhood of Brooklyn, New York. His father left the family when he was two, and his mother spent seven years in and out of the hospital, so he was raised primarily by his paternal grandparents, Minnie and Davin Lonow, who were Russian immigrants and communist supporters. Since they spoke only Yiddish, he did not learn English until he was five. His maternal great-uncle was Yakov Sverdlov, the first head of state of Soviet Russia.

Lonow attended Cunningham Junior High School, where he was a poor student. However, he loved theater, television, and film at an early age. When he was 13, he began training under Herbert Berghof and Uta Hagen at the Herbert Berghof Studio (he lied about his age as the minimum was 15), and he also studied dance at the Joffrey Ballet. He later attended the City College of New York, where he studied accounting, but dropped out after three and a half years to pursue an acting career.

== Career ==
Lonow began his career as a stage actor in New York City. In 1963, he was a dance extra in the film You're a Big Boy Now. In 1965, he played his first lead role opposite Jean Stapleton in a production of Enter Laughing at the Totem Pole Playhouse in Pennsylvania, where he spent two seasons on a paid apprenticeship. He was involved with the New York Shakespeare Festival for many years, as an actor, stage manager, and props master, and originated several roles in Joseph Papp's Rock Hamlet. He and his wife, JoAnne Astrow, created the improv show Off the Wall with other actors including Henry Winkler. He also often performed on stage in Baltimore.

In 1976, Lonow and his family drove to Los Angeles for a vacation and then stayed there to pursue their careers. He soon earned minor roles on the television series Spencer's Pilots, All in the Family, and Days of Our Lives. In 1978, he played the main character Lennie Bellini on the CBS sitcom Husbands, Wives & Lovers, which aired for one season. The same year, he made his credited feature film debut in the musical comedy Thank God It's Friday, playing an accountant celebrating his fifth wedding anniversary at a discotheque. Among his later credits were the television series Fantasy Island, Archie Bunker's Place, Moonlighting, and 1st & Ten, and a cameo in Adam Sandler's film The Wedding Singer.

Lonow joined Budd Friedman as co-owner of the Improvisation comedy club on Melrose Avenue, Los Angeles, in 1979. The same year, recalling his pro-labor family background, he helped organize the strike at the Comedy Store in West Hollywood, which resulted in the rival club's owner, Mitzi Shore, beginning to pay performers at the venue. Over the years, Lonow and Friedman expanded the Improv franchise into more than a dozen locations and the A&E show An Evening at the Improv. In 2018, they sold the company to Levity Entertainment.

In 2007, Lonow and Astrow earned nominations for the Primetime Emmy Award for Outstanding Variety, Music or Comedy Special as executive producers for Lewis Black's special Lewis Black: Red, White and Screwed. In 2012, they co-produced Black's one-man Broadway show Running on Empty. In 2017, they co-produced the off-Broadway play Cruel Intentions: The '90s Musical. Other production credits on Broadway included The Prom and A Christmas Carol.

In 2018, Lonow directed the play Jews, Christians, and Screwing Stalin, which he co-wrote with Astrow. The play was inspired by his family and premiered at the Matrix Theatre in Los Angeles. In 2025, he and his wife acted in the dark comedy film D(e)ad, which was directed by his stepdaughter, Claudia Lonow, and written by and starring his step-granddaughter, Isabella Roland.

== Personal life ==
Lonow met his wife, JoAnne Astrow, while studying at the Berghof Studio. The couple married on February 9, 1969, and Astrow's daughter, Claudia, took his surname. After becoming grandparents, they shared a household for many years with Claudia and their granddaughter, Isabella Roland. The living arrangement inspired Claudia's show How to Live with Your Parents (For the Rest of Your Life), in which the step-grandfather is played by Brad Garrett.
