= Claudia Lonow =

American actress (born 1963)

- Born: Claudia Rapaport; January 26, 1963 (age 63); New York City, New York U.S.
- Occupations: Writer; producer; actress; comedian
- Years active: 1979–present
- Children: Isabella Roland
- Mother: JoAnne Astrow
- Relatives: Michael Rapaport (half-brother); Mark Lonow (stepfather); Brennan Lee Mulligan (son-in-law)

Claudia Lonow (born January 26, 1963) is an American actress, comedian, television writer, and producer. She is best known for her portrayal of Diana Fairgate on Knots Landing (1979–1984, 1993).

== Early life and education ==
Lonow was born Claudia Rapaport in New York City to mother JoAnne Astrow, a comedian and talent manager, and father David Rapaport, a radio executive who was the general manager of the All-Disco format at New York radio station WKTU Disco 92. She has two younger half-brothers: Eric Rapaport, a doctor, and Michael Rapaport, a film and television actor. Her stepfather is comic Mark Lonow, who owned the Improv with Budd Friedman. She took his surname. Lonow is Jewish and grew up in a Jewish family in Greenwich Village, Manhattan.

Lonow graduated from Beverly Hills High School.

== Career ==
=== Actor ===
Lonow is known for her role as Diana Fairgate on the CBS series Knots Landing, in which she appeared from 1979 to 1984 and again in 1993. She reprised her role in the 1997 reunion miniseries Knots Landing: Back to the Cul-de-Sac. She guest starred on Fantasy Island, The Love Boat and Hotel.

=== Writer and producer ===
Lonow's behind-the-scenes career took off with her creation, co-production and writing of Rude Awakening, a television series which aired on Showtime from 1998–2001 and starred actresses Sherilyn Fenn and Rain Pryor. Lonow also created, wrote and produced the comedy series Good Girls Don't.

Lonow held writing and consulting producer credits on the TV series Less Than Perfect. She also wrote and co-executive produced the FOX series The War at Home and CBS's Accidentally on Purpose.

In 2012, she created, wrote and produced the ABC sitcom How to Live with Your Parents (for the Rest of Your Life) starring Sarah Chalke, Brad Garrett, and Elizabeth Perkins.

== Personal life ==
Lonow has a daughter, Isabella Roland, a performer and writer. In 2024, she directed the film D(e)ad, a dark comedy written by and starring Roland alongside several other members of the family.

== Filmography ==
- 1996: Don't Quit Your Day Job (Video Game) – writer
- 1997: The New Adventures of Robin Hood (TV Series) – writer (1 episode)
- 1998-2001: Rude Awakening (TV Series) – Executive producer (47 episodes); Co-executive producer (8 episodes), Creator (55 episodes); Writer (13 episodes)
- 2003: Regular Joe (TV Series) – Creative consultant (1 episode)
- 2003-2006: Less than Perfect (TV Series) – Consulting producer (49 episodes); Writer (2 episodes); Consultant (12 episodes)
- 2004: Good Girls Don't... (TV Series) – Executive producer, Creator (8 episodes)
- 2006: Flirt (TV Movie) – Executive producer
- 2006-2007: The War at Home (TV Series) – Co-executive producer (32 episodes); Writer (3 episodes); Teleplay by (1 episode)
- 2008: Cashmere Mafia (TV Series) – Consulting producer (6 episodes); Writer (1 episode)
- 2009: Surviving Suburbia (TV Series) – writer (3 episodes)
- 2009-2010: Accidentally on Purpose (TV Series) – Executive producer (16 episodes); Creator (8 episodes); Writer (4 episodes)
- 2010: Iris Expanding (TV Movie) – Executive producer
- 2011: Friends with Benefits (TV Series) – Co-executive producer (11 episodes); Writer (1 episode)
- 2012: Work It (TV Series) – Co-executive producer (1 episode); Writer (2 episodes)
- 2012: Counter Culture (TV Movie) – Executive producer
- 2013: How to Live with Your Parents (For the Rest of Your Life) (For the Rest of Your Life) (TV Series) – Executive producer (5 episodes); Creator (13 episodes); Writer (3 episodes)
- 2013-2014: Sean Saves the World (TV Series) – writer (2 episodes)
- 2015: Bummed (Short) – Co-writer, Director
- 2016: Comedy Central Sit N Spin (TV Series) – writer (1 episode)
- 2016: Crowded (TV Series) – Consulting producer (12 episodes); Writer (1 episode)
- 2025: D(e)ad (Feature Film) - Director

Actor

- 1979: The Mary Tyler Moore Hour (TV Series) – Mary Ellen in Mary's Goddaughter, Episode #1.6 (1979)
- 1979-1984, 1993: Knots Landing (TV Series) – Diana Fairgate / Diana (81 episodes)
- 1982: Drop-Out Father (TV Movie) – Peggy McCall
- 1982: Fantasy Island (TV Series) – Taylor in Legends/The Perfect Gentleman (1982)
- 1982: Wacko – Pam Graves
- 1983: The Love Boat (TV Series) – Suzie Scott in The Zinging Valentine/The Very Temporary Secretary/Final Score (1983)
- 1987: Hotel (TV Series) – Hayley Cole in Fast Forward (1987)
- 1987, 1989: Duet (TV Series) – Ms. Taylor in I Never Played for My Father: Part 2 (1987); Carol in Too Many Cooks (1989)
- 1990: Thanksgiving Day (TV Movie) – Toni
- 1990: Eating – Party Guest
- 1994: Beverly Hills, 90210 (TV Series) – Hairdresser in What I Did on My Summer Vacation and Other Stories (1994)
- 1996: Don't Quit Your Day Job (Video Game) – Shirly Felcker
- 1997: 7th Heaven (TV Series) – Waitress in America's Most Wanted (1997)
- 1997: Knots Landing: Back to the Cul-de-Sac (TV Mini-Series) – Diana Fairgate
- 2001: Rude Awakening (TV Series) – Linda in Altar Ego (2001)

== Works and publications ==
- Lonow, Claudia (December 8, 2010). "Christmas With My Ex". The Huffington Post.
- Lonow, Claudia (December 15, 2010). "Christmas Past With My Ex, French Edition". The Huffington Post.
- Lonow, Claudia (December 27, 2010). "Christmas in New York With My Ex: It's On". The Huffington Post.
- Lonow, Claudia (January 10, 2011). How To Not Succeed In Show Business By Really Trying (ebook). Amazon.
- Lonow, Claudia (January 25, 2011). "The Real Housewives of Beverly Hills: Could I Be One Too?". The Huffington Post.
- Lonow, Claudia (April 1, 2013). "How to Write a Show About Living With Your Parents (for the Rest of Your Life, Possibly)". The Huffington Post.
- Lonow, Claudia (July 14, 2014). "West Side Story". Fresh Yarn.
