= Corin Wells =

American comedian

Corin Wells is an actress, writer, producer, and comedian. She received a nomination for a Primetime Emmy Award for her work on A Black Lady Sketch Show.

== Career ==
Wells first studied improv at Philly Improv Theater. In 2014 she began taking classes at UCB Theatre, and eventually joined the musical improv team Rumpleteaser. She is a mezzo-soprano. In November 2020 she cofounded Squirrel Comedy Theatre, a nonprofit training and performance theatre in New York. She also received recognition for a parody video of conservative media personality Candace Owens.

Wells was a staff writer for seasons one and two of The Amber Ruffin Show. She was next hired as a writer and producer for A Black Lady Sketch Show. She also wrote for the animated comedy Kevin (2026). She has appeared on the Dropout series Very Important People and Make Some Noise.

In 2026 she performed at the SXSW Comedy Festival.

== Accolades ==
- 2021 – Just for Laughs, New Faces
- 2023 – Nominee, Primetime Emmy Award for Outstanding Scripted Variety Series (for A Black Lady Sketch Show)
