= Chris Grace (actor) =

American actor and comedian (born 1973)

- Grace in 2026
- Born: Christopher Tung Shieh; May 15, 1973 (age 53); Columbus, Mississippi, U.S.
- Education: University of North Carolina School of the Arts (BFA)
- Occupations: Actor, comedian
- Years active: 2010–present
- Known for: Superstore; Chris Grace as Scarlett Johansson
- Spouse: Eric Michaud (m. 2017)

Christopher Tung Shieh (born May 15, 1973), known professionally as Chris Grace, is an American actor and comedian. He is best known for his roles as Jerry in the NBC sitcom Superstore and Christian Grey in the off-Broadway musical parody 50 Shades! The Musical, as well as his work with the comedy streaming service Dropout.

== Early life ==
Grace was born on May 15, 1973, in Columbus, Mississippi. He grew up in Houston, Texas. He began performing in junior high school and studied acting at the University of North Carolina School of the Arts.

== Career ==
Grace is a member of Baby Wants Candy, a Chicago-based comedy ensemble. At Baby Wants Candy, Grace was the lead actor for musical parody 50 Shades! The Musical, and co-wrote Thrones! The Musical Parody.

Grace is also a regular performer in Magic to Do: Musical Improv, held at Upright Citizens Brigade Sunset. He has been involved with the streaming service Dropout, with his standup comedy special Chris Grace: As Scarlett Johansson premiering there. He performed on their improvisational game show Make Some Noise in 2024, and was on the second season of the panel show Smartypants in 2025.

== Personal life ==
Grace is openly gay, and part of the bear community. He married Eric Michaud in 2017.

== Filmography ==
=== Film ===
Year	Title	Role	Notes
2010	On The Road	Ely	Short film
2014	That Awkward Moment	Deli Owner	
2015	48 Hours 'Til Monday	Chauncey	TV movie
2016	Tim Heidecker: Work From Home	Kitchen Man 1	Short
2016	White House Fart	General	Short film
2016	Still Single	Timmy Hong	
2017	The King of Dad Jokes	Jeff	Short film
2018	Office Uprising	Beefed Up Ammotech Supervisor	
2018	You Are The Captain	Courier	Short film
2018	The Bateman Lectures on Depression	Gilbert	Documentary
2020	Moneybag Head	Dennis	Short film/post-production
2020	All the Bright Places	Hudson	

=== Television ===
Year	Title	Role	Notes
2011	Sweet Misery	Chris	
2011	The Six	Asian Dad	Episode: "The Six Girls You'll See Back Home"
2011–2012	Fake Henrik Zetterberg	Manny Root	5 episodes
2011–2012	PITv	Party Goer	4 episodes
2012	Jest Originals	Josh Lin	Episode: "Jeremy Lin Picked Last in Pickup Game"
2012	Tech Up	Japanese Investor	
2011–2012	CollegeHumor Originals	Kim Jong-Il / Kim Jong-Un/ Business Man 1	5 episodes
2015	Adam Ruins Everything	Busy Man	Episode: "Adam Ruins Voting"
2016	Broad City	Kenny	episode: "Philadelphia"
2016	Serious Music	Dunker	2 episodes
2016	This Is Us	Paul	2 episodes
2017	Idiotsitter	Professor Chang	
2017	The Thundermans	Manu	Episode: "Thunder in Paradise" (uncredited)
2017	Ryan Hansen Solves Crimes on Television	Tom	Episode: "Joel McHale Is: Ryan Hansen"
2017–2020	Superstore	Jerry	14 episodes
2018	Sofia the First	Scare-Acuda	Voice role, Episode: "Return to Merroway Cove"
2018	Experts	Ted Shieh	
2020	Stumptown	Denny	3 Episodes
2020	Pen15	Mr. Brown	Episode 2: "Wrestling"
2020	We're Not Together	Dean Cappart	
2021	Mr. Mayor	Jesse	1 episode
2021	Atypical	Laird	3 episodes
2023	Um, Actually	Himself	Episode: "American Horror Story, KaBlam!, Squid Game"
2023	Play It By Ear	Himself	2 episodes
2023, 2025	Dirty Laundry	Himself	2 episodes
2024	Make Some Noise	Himself	Episode: "Willy Wonka's Lawyer's Opening Statement"
2024	Dropout Presents	Himself / Scarlett Johansson	Episode: "Chris Grace as Scarlett Johansson"; also producer
2025	The Residence	Duane Ladage	7 episodes
2025	Game Changer	Big Tobacco	Episode: "Outvoted"
2025	Smartypants	Himself	Episode: "Puzzles, Siblings, Mysteries"
2026	Game Changer	Shopkeeper	Episode: "Night Shift"

=== Podcast ===
Year	Title	Role	Notes
2021	Bad Vibes		
2021	Mission to Zyxx	Shai'An	
2021	Operation Cordelia	Jeff	
2025	The Neighborhood Listen	Mary	
