= Accidentally on Purpose (TV series) =

American television sitcom (2009–2010)

- Genre: Sitcom
- Created by: Claudia Lonow
- Based on: Accidentally on Purpose by Mary F. Pols
- Starring: Jenna Elfman; Jon Foster; Ashley Jensen; Nicolas Wright; Grant Show; Lennon Parham
- Music by: John Swihart
- Opening theme: "Birds of a Feather" performed by The Rosenbergs
- Country of origin: United States
- Original language: English
- No. of seasons: 1
- No. of episodes: 18

Production
- Executive producers: Claudia Lonow; Gail Berman; Lloyd Braun; Eugene Stein
- Camera setup: Film; Multi-camera
- Running time: 20-21 minutes
- Production companies: BermanBraun; CBS Productions

Original release
- Network: CBS
- Release: September 21, 2009 – April 21, 2010

Accidentally on Purpose is an American television sitcom created by Claudia Lonow, that aired on CBS from September 21, 2009, to April 21, 2010, during the 2009–10 season. The series stars Jenna Elfman, Jon Foster, Ashley Jensen, Nicolas Wright, Grant Show, and Lennon Parham and was produced by BermanBraun and CBS Television Studios. It was based on the book of the same name by Mary F. Pols.

On May 18, 2010, CBS cancelled the series after one season.

== Plot ==
Accidentally on Purpose follows Billie (Jenna Elfman), a San Francisco movie critic in her 30s. Billie meets Zack (Jon Foster), an aspiring chef in his 20s, at a local bar and they have a one-night stand. She soon finds out that she is pregnant, and decides to keep the baby. She must simultaneously deal with her boss and ex-boyfriend, James (Grant Show), who finds himself jealous of Zack. Before the story began, she had hoped that James would ask her to marry him, but he told her that he was not ready because he was married once before.

Thanks to this unexpected arrival, Billie and Zack have agreed to live together platonically, since the only place that Zack has called home is his van. While Billie receives encouragement and advice from her alcoholic best friend Olivia (Ashley Jensen) and her conventional, younger, married sister Abby (Lennon Parham), she also has to deal with Zack's freeloading friend Davis (Nicolas Wright), among others, when they start turning her place into a frat house, leaving Billie to question whether she is living with a boyfriend, a roommate, or a second child to raise.

== Theme song ==
The theme song for the show is "Birds of a Feather", written by David Fagin of the indie-rock band The Rosenbergs. The song is on their album Department Store Girl.

== History ==
On November 3, 2009, CBS ordered an additional five episodes of the series, bringing the total to 18. In early 2010 CBS moved Accidentally on Purpose to Wednesday nights from Mondays, to accommodate the midseason return of Rules of Engagement and the cancellation of Gary Unmarried. However, after the ratings slipped CBS elected not to renew the series and on May 18, 2010, made the cancellation official; the cancellation was part of CBS' decision to eliminate all of its Wednesday night comedies in favor of trying a Thursday-night block.

== Critical reception ==
Accidentally on Purpose received mixed reviews, scoring a 50/100 on Metacritic, while scoring a 6.2/10 with viewers. The New York Times, in a review of the show's first episode, called Grant Show's performance "graceful" and said Elfman is as "funny as the script allows, in that broad, robo-comic way you may remember from Dharma & Greg."

The series had an average of eight million viewers per episode while airing on Mondays after How I Met Your Mother, but fell to an average of 5.5 million of viewers per episode while airing on Wednesdays after The New Adventures of Old Christine, which was also canceled in 2010.

== Cast ==
=== Main ===
- Jenna Elfman as Billie Chase
- Jon Foster as Zachary "Zack" Crawchuck
- Ashley Jensen as Olivia Hollenbeck
- Nicolas Wright as Davis
- Grant Show as James
- Lennon Parham as Abigail "Abby" Chase

=== Recurring ===
- Pooch Hall as Ryan
- David Sutcliffe as Brian
- Larry Wilmore as Dr. Roland
- Bryan Cuprill as Nick
- Michael Rapaport as Sullivan "Sully" Boyd
- Matthew Glave as Officer Marion Ravitz

== Episodes ==
No.	Title	Directed by	Written by	Original release date	Prod. code	U.S. viewers (millions)
1	"Pilot"	Pamela Fryman	Claudia Lonow	September 21, 2009	101	8.91
Billie (Jenna Elfman) meets Zack (Jon Foster), an aspiring chef in his 20s, at a local bar and they have a one-night stand at his friend's apartment. She soon finds out that she is pregnant from the fling and decides to keep the baby. She must simultaneously deal with her boss and ex-boyfriend, James, who finds himself jealous of Zack. Before the story began, she had hoped that James would ask her to marry him, but he told her that he was not ready because he was married once before. Thanks to this unexpected arrival, Billie and Zack have agreed to live together platonically, since the only place that Zack has called home is his van. While Billie receives encouragement and advice from her party girl best friend (and fellow journalist) Olivia (Ashley Jensen) and her conventional, younger, married sister Abby (Lennon Parham), she also has to deal with Zack's freeloading friend Davis (Nicolas Wright), among others, when they start turning her place into a frat house, leaving Billie to question whether she is living with a boyfriend, a roommate, or a second child to raise.
2	"Memento"	Pamela Fryman	Gregg Mettler	September 28, 2009	102	8.02
When Billie tries to learn more about Zack, he becomes evasive. While snooping through Zack's belongings, Billie discovers a note addressed to her that he never finished writing. Meanwhile, Zack gets an offer that may mean having to leave Billie and his unborn child.
3	"One Night Stand"	Ted Wass	Vince Calandra	October 5, 2009	104	7.17
Billie's pregnancy causes bodily and hormonal changes in her, causing men to hit on her. Meanwhile, Zack refuses to have sex with Billie after she tries to have sex with him, due to a very embarrassing reason.
4	"The Date"	John Pasquin	Cynthia Greenburg	October 12, 2009	103	7.73
Billie and Zack discuss their feelings on dating and agree to see other people. However, Billie's pregnancy gets in the way of any potential love connections and Zack's date does not go as planned.
5	"The Love Guru"	Andrew D. Weyman	Story by : Alan Kirschenbaum; Teleplay by : Bill Kunstler & Alison McDonald	October 19, 2009	106	8.26
Billie tries to live vicariously through Zack and Davis by offering up dating advice to them. However, things take a turn when the objects of the boys' affection reveal their true intentions. Meanwhile, James tries to hook up with teenagers by pretending to be one himself. Abby ends up irritating Olivia after she sends a friend request to the latter on Facebook.
6	"Fight Club"	Andrew D. Weyman	Bill Kunstler	November 2, 2009	105	8.08
Billie and Zack have their first big argument after Zack tries to surprise Billie by installing a low flow toilet. Billie becomes the butt of jokes when her waxing appointment is halted due to Zack and Davis. Billie's baby kicks for the first time.
7	"The Godfather"	David Trainer	Vince Calandra & Cynthia Greenburg	November 9, 2009	109	7.89
Billie unintentionally causes Abby and Nick to break up when she asks them to be godparents. However, after a fun night on the town with Davis goes too far, Billie must stop Abby before she does something she will regret. Also, Billie has to work with Sullivan "Sully" Boyd, a fellow worker, which does not please Zack or James, as both think that Sully has a thing for pregnant women.
8	"The Third Man"	John Pasquin	Mike Dieffenbach	November 16, 2009	107	7.27
When Billie starts dating a colleague from her newspaper, Zack is unable to hide his jealousy.
9	"Working Girl"	Ted Wass	Andrea Abbate & David Holden	November 23, 2009	108	7.89
Billie is threatened when James hires another film critic, Max (Ben Schwartz), at the paper and sets out to prove how valuable she is. Meanwhile, Abby tries to make Olivia pay her share of tab.
10	"Class"	Barnet Kellman	Franklyn Hardy & Shane Kosakowski	December 7, 2009	110	7.91
Billie and Zack take instructional parenting classes separately due to their schedules. Zack intends to meet some other fathers as most of his other friends are not at this stage of life yet, but instead makes friends with a lesbian couple. Billie goes with Olivia and Abby. While Zack shines in his class, Abby outshines Billie at all the tasks. The lesbian couple guides Davis to another lesbian couple to help him get laid, which yields unexpected results. Abby starts taking pole dancing lessons.
11	"It Happened One Christmas"	Gail Mancuso	Gregg Mettler & Claudia Lonow	December 14, 2009	111	8.81
Worried that she will ruin Christmas, as she has in previous years, Billie tries to hide from her parents the fact that Zack is living with her. Zack spends Christmas with Davis and realizes that Billie is the coolest woman he has ever met. When he returns to the apartment he proposes to Billie. Meanwhile, Abby's husband, Nick, tries to impress their father.
12	"The Odd Couples"	Ted Wass	Mike Dieffenbach & David Holden	January 11, 2010	112	8.43
Zack tries to get along with Nick, but Nick is too strange for him. When Billie tells Abby that Zack doesn't like Nick, they fight and Abby decides not to arrange Billie's baby shower. Davis pretends to be Dave Grohl's younger brother to impress a girl. Billie and Zack discover the gender of their child – thanks to Abby.
13	"The Rock"	Andrew D. Weyman	Alison McDonald & Andrea Abbate	January 18, 2010	113	9.56
Billie and Sully have to work on a story, but due to her embarrassing him previously, Sully is reluctant. Billie forces Olivia to flirt with Sully until their story is printed. Everybody gets a shock when James is axed and tells them that any one of them could be next. Zack begins a new business venture with Davis as his partner, while Olivia is caught on the newspaper's security camera.
14	"Attack of the 50 Foot Woman"	Ted Wass	Claudia Lonow & Bill Kunstler & David Holden	February 1, 2010	114	8.42
Billie is happy when the baby's crib arrives, until she finds that neither Zack nor Davis is keen to assemble it. Her efforts to manipulate Zack create an even bigger mess, eventually leading to a fight between her and Zack. Meanwhile, Davis is working in a gay bar (pretending to be gay) to get some extra cash. An unsuspecting Zack is pulled into his charade when a bar patron takes interest in Davis.
15	"Back to School"	David Trainer	Franklin Hardy & Shane Kosakowski	February 8, 2010	115	9.10
Billie invites herself to Zack's high school reunion but worries that she can't compete with his hot ex-girlfriend Melissa. Meanwhile, Olivia helps Abby host a party where they try to sell Abby's miracle youth juice. Davis reveals a dirty secret about Melissa to Billie, but it turns out that it was not exactly a secret for Zack. Ryan crashes Zack's reunion pretending to be a student, but gets some painful memories at the reunion.
16	"Face Off"	Ted Wass	Jenn Lloyd & Kevin Bonani	April 7, 2010	116	6.03
Zack is upset when Billie hires a baby nurse without consulting him. Davis and Ryan soon find out that Zack is right to be concerned. Meanwhile, Abby tries to mend the fences between Olivia and her less than ideal mother.
17	"Speed: Part 1"	Ted Wass	David Rosenthal & DJ Nash	April 14, 2010	117	5.90
Billie pretends to go into labor to save Zack from getting a traffic ticket after they're pulled over for speeding. Meanwhile, Olivia and Davis end up sleeping together. Nick and Abby get an opportunity to go to a star-studded premiere that Billie missed, but Abby isn't as happy with the opportunity as she thought she would be.
18	"Speed: Part 2"	Ted Wass	Claudia Lonow	April 21, 2010	118	5.22
After faking labor pains to get Zack out of a speeding ticket, Billie goes into labor – for real. Unfortunately, things take a turn when Zack gets busted by the officer they had initially lied to and is hauled off to the police station. Abby goes to bail Zack, but ends up with him as well. In the end, it is Olivia who unexpectedly saves the day. Billie gives birth to her baby, Henry, and agrees to marry Zack.
