= Dropout (streaming service) =

American subscription streaming service

Dropout TV
- Website type: Video on demand; OTT; Digital distribution
- Headquarters: Los Angeles, California, United States
- Area served: Worldwide
- Owner: Sam Reich
- Industry: Internet
- Parent: CH Media (DBA Dropout)
- Website: www.dropout.tv
- Registration: Required
- Launched: September 26, 2018; 8 years ago
- Current status: Active

Dropout is an American comedy subscription streaming service run by the production company of the same name (formerly CollegeHumor), founded in September 2018. Its ad-free original shows are mainly composed of live play, such as Dimension 20 hosted by Brennan Lee Mulligan, improv comedy and panel shows like Game Changer and its spinoff Make Some Noise, both hosted by Dropout owner and CEO Sam Reich, and Very Important People hosted by Vic Michaelis. Dropout's series often feature a rotating cast of regular comedians and performers.

== History ==
=== CollegeHumor ===
Originally founded in 1999 by Josh Abramson and Ricky Van Veen, then-independent website CollegeHumor was acquired by holding media and entertainment company IAC in August 2006. CollegeHumor's work originally only included editorial articles, but eventually expanded to include online video and development and production of TV shows. In 2013, the video production CollegeHumor team moved to Los Angeles to continue to create online and traditional video consisting of shows like Adam Ruins Everything and Hot Date as well as sketch and short-form comedy on its YouTube channel. However, ad revenue became increasingly scarce, with YouTube's unfavorable ad rates and an ongoing risk of CollegeHumor's content being demonetized on the platform, as well as Facebook's inflated viewership numbers not bringing in anticipated ad sales.

In the mid-2010s, CollegeHumor syndicated its content to various companies, including Condé Nast Entertainment, DailyMotion, Samsung, Vessel, and Watchable. CollegeHumor subsidiary Big Breakfast signed a deal with Verizon's go90 streaming service in 2015, which included the show Fatal Decision and a commitment of ten video clips per month for the platform. During this time, Shane Rahmani served as CollegeHumor's general manager. Fatal Decision was ultimately released on Dropout's own platform in 2025.

After starting production in 2017, CollegeHumor launched its Dropout TV video platform on September 26, 2018. CollegeHumor's then-CEO, Rich Cusick, announced the service as a "TV-MA version of CollegeHumor" that would "allow us to double down our investment into premium original content, resulting in a bigger, better, badder CollegeHumor." Dropout was also pitched as a way to allow fans to dive deeper into pre-established popular characters and shows from CollegeHumor's YouTube channel. CollegeHumor's Chief Creative Officer, Sam Reich, also claimed that the founding of Dropout was in response to difficulty in receiving advertising dollars on traditional media platforms for mature content. At launch, Dropout announced a mix of scripted and unscripted content, as well as digital comics and chat-story content and a subscriber-only Discord.

Dropout utilizes CollegeHumor spinoff Vimeo as its hosting service. Dropout officially launched native iOS and Android apps for its service in December 2018, allowing users to watch shows and also cast to smart TVs. Comics and chat stories were also integrated into the app.

=== Independent ownership ===
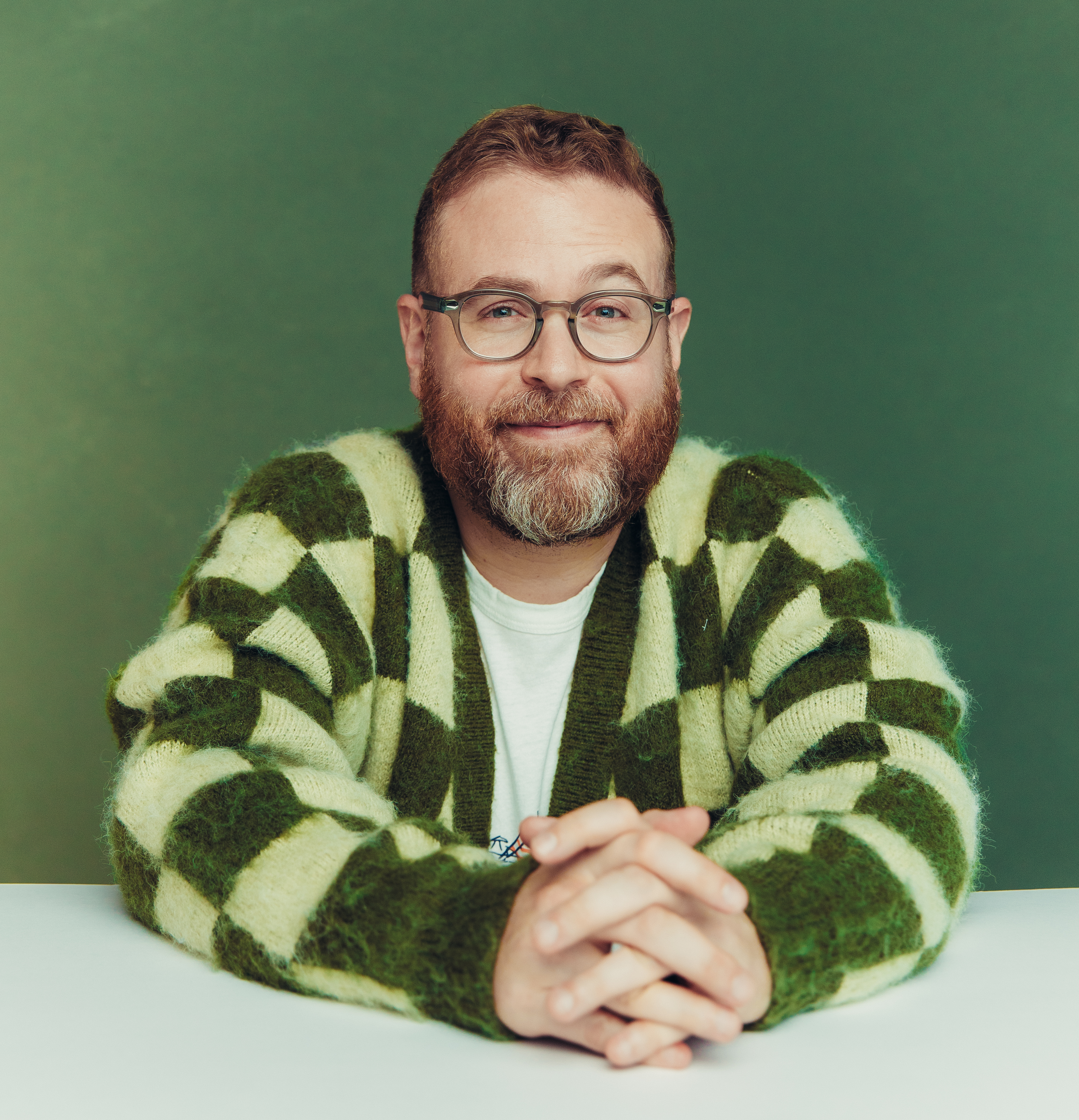
Dropout CEO Sam Reich (pictured in 2024) acquired a majority interest in the service in 2020.

After launch, Dropout saw that the unscripted and less expensive content both acquired and retained viewers, while more expensive and scripted shows neither acquired nor retained viewers, with the limited exception of WTF 101. Dimension 20 became the most popular show on the platform, followed by Um, Actually and Cartoon Hell. Game Changer, hosted by Reich, would also become a success upon launch in 2019. A year after Dropout's launch, the service had between 75,000 and 100,000 subscribers. Dropout planned to release a new original title per month in 2019, according to Sam Reich. However, the programming slate did not allow Dropout to pivot quickly enough away from scripted content and it was still not profitable by the end of 2019; Reich later noted that "we had a writer's room full of scripted comedy writers. All of us were sort of having to pivot to think about something that wasn't our primary skill set." Because Dropout was in the middle of a $30 million subscription investment, the streamer was on track to "lose" another $10 million by the end of 2019 before it would be profitable.

In January 2020, IAC announced it had ceased financing CollegeHumor, leading to the layoff of 105 employees. IAC unsuccessfully attempted to sell CollegeHumor to numerous studios and entertainment companies at this time, reportedly seeking up to $100 million for the company; Viacom offered to buy CollegeHumor and its back catalog for $3 million. IAC ultimately sold CollegeHumor to Reich, the then-Chief Creative Officer, in 2020, who transitioned to CEO as a result. IAC kept a minority stake in Dropout, having been convinced by Reich it had the potential to become worth more than Viacom's offer. The deal was finalized in March 2020. Dropout ended production on scripted shows and focused on unscripted shows such as Um, Actually, Dimension 20, and Game Changer, briefly producing these series through online conference during the beginning of the COVID-19 pandemic.

During the July–November 2023 SAG-AFTRA strike, Dropout series such as Dimension 20, Game Changer and Um, Actually were initially shut down. Reich stated:

Because we aren't associated with the AMPTP, it's possible we may be able to reach an interim agreement with SAG that allows us to continue to produce content during the strike. But we'll only do that, obviously, if we get the blessing of the union and the buy-in of our performers. If not, we have enough content in the can to last us a little past the end of the year. ... As for me, I intend to honor my union's position that I not promote SAG productions as a performer – even if they are produced by me. That means that I won't personally be promoting any of our shows for the time being.

In August 2023, Reich announced that all Dropout shows had resumed production as it was determined that their "New Media Agreement for Non-Dramatic Programming" was actually a non-struck SAG-AFTRA contract.

Also in August 2023, NPR stated that "Dropout has not shared their official subscriber count, but Reich says it's in the mid-hundreds of thousands. He's very aware that doesn't come close to the hundreds of millions of subscribers that large media companies have, but, to him, that's not necessarily a problem. ... Though they're not required to by unions, he said Dropout is working to become one of the first streamers to pay residuals to their writers, actors, and crew members". Dropout also pays performers to audition. Dropout's overall subscriber count almost doubled during 2023; By October 2025, Dropout had over a million subscribers.

Dropout officially retired all CollegeHumor branding in September 2023. Later that year, Dropout shared its profit with its employees and other workers, giving them between a tenth and a fourth of their total earnings. This practice continued in 2024 for a second year. Additionally, Dropout offers higher-than-average pay to performers: due to its heavy use of prosthetics, actors on Very Important People are paid between $5,000 and $10,000 per episode, and main cast members of Dimension 20 are paid approximately $7,000 per episode. Stand-up comedian Gianmarco Soresi made more money filming one episode of Game Changer than he did for his role on the Paramount+ show Crutch. Reich himself earned almost nothing during the first two years of Dropout ownership; in 2022 he earned over $1 million.

Dropout signed an expansion deal with talent agency CAA in July 2025. In August 2025, Variety reported that Brennan Lee Mulligan had "struck a new three-year development deal at his longtime home media company Dropout". In the 10th episode of Game Changer's seventh season, Vic Michaelis and Aabria Iyengar were elected as honorary presidents of Dropout.

== Production ==
Dropout is headquartered in Silver Lake, Los Angeles. The company's production studio includes two sound stages, one for Dimension 20 and one which rotates between other productions, as well as an art studio for set and prop design. As of 2025, the company has 40 full-time employees.

== Service and availability ==
Dropout is available worldwide; as of 2024 around 60% of subscribers were in the United States.

=== Subscription model ===
The company has justified the pricing model as allowing them to create content without being dependent on, or beholden to, requests from advertisers. In December 2018, visitors to the service spent on average 31 minutes per visit, and visited on average 3.5 times per week. Throughout 2019, Dropout began to experiment with more live streaming versions of their shows, through using Twitch and podcast-like formats. At the end of 2023, the average user subscribed for 18 months; Reich said in June 2024 that the statistic is continuing to increase. As of June 2024, Dropout earns around 80–85% of its revenue via subscriptions.

Dropout launched with a beta price of $3.99 per month for the first three months of the service. After December 2018, the price rose to a three tiered option, with monthly memberships for $5.99/month, semi-annual memberships for $4.99/month, and annual memberships for $3.99/month. As of January 2022, new subscribers paid $5.99 monthly or $59.99 yearly, while those who already subscribed prior to that date were charged $4.99 monthly or $47.99 yearly. In April 2025, Dropout announced a subscription cost increase ($6.99 monthly or $69.99 annually) which took effect on May 7, 2025. However, this increase did not impact existing subscribers who were grandfathered in to the legacy subscription cost.

In August 2019, CollegeHumor partnered with Facebook to offer Dropout content via paid video subscriptions on Facebook's platform. Users are also able to access Dropout content through YouTube via the join function.

In October 2025, CEO Sam Reich announced a "Superfan" subscription for $129.99 a year, described as a 'Pay more if you feel like it' tier. Perks include behind the scenes content, discounts and additional items in Dropout's online store, and early access to purchase tickets for live events.

=== Services ===
In addition to original series, Dropout offered videos produced by CollegeHumor 72 hours before they were released to the public. Previously, a subscriber-only Discord server was included as a service, later expanded to non-subscribers as well, until its closure on May 26, 2024. Dropout also has a store which sells merchandise (such as shirts, stickers, and mugs) related to shows on the platform.

In February 2026, Dropout announced that British surrealist adult puppet musical comedy horror web series Don't Hug Me I'm Scared would be non-exclusively licensed to them for three years, in the first-ever licensing deal for Dropout. Other licensing deals have been reached since, including for the works of Don Hertzfeldt and the 2022 film Hundreds of Beavers.

== Cast members ==
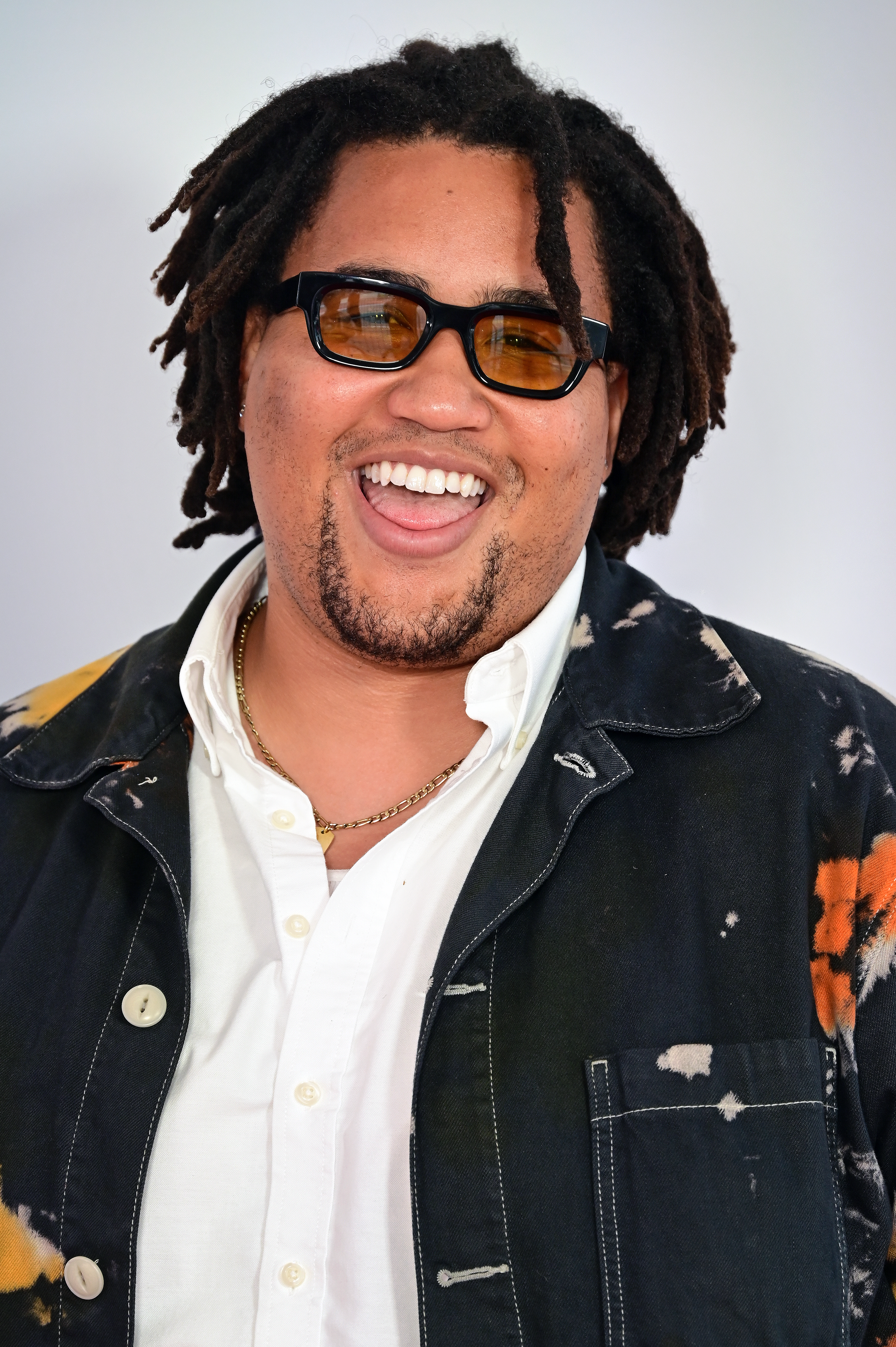
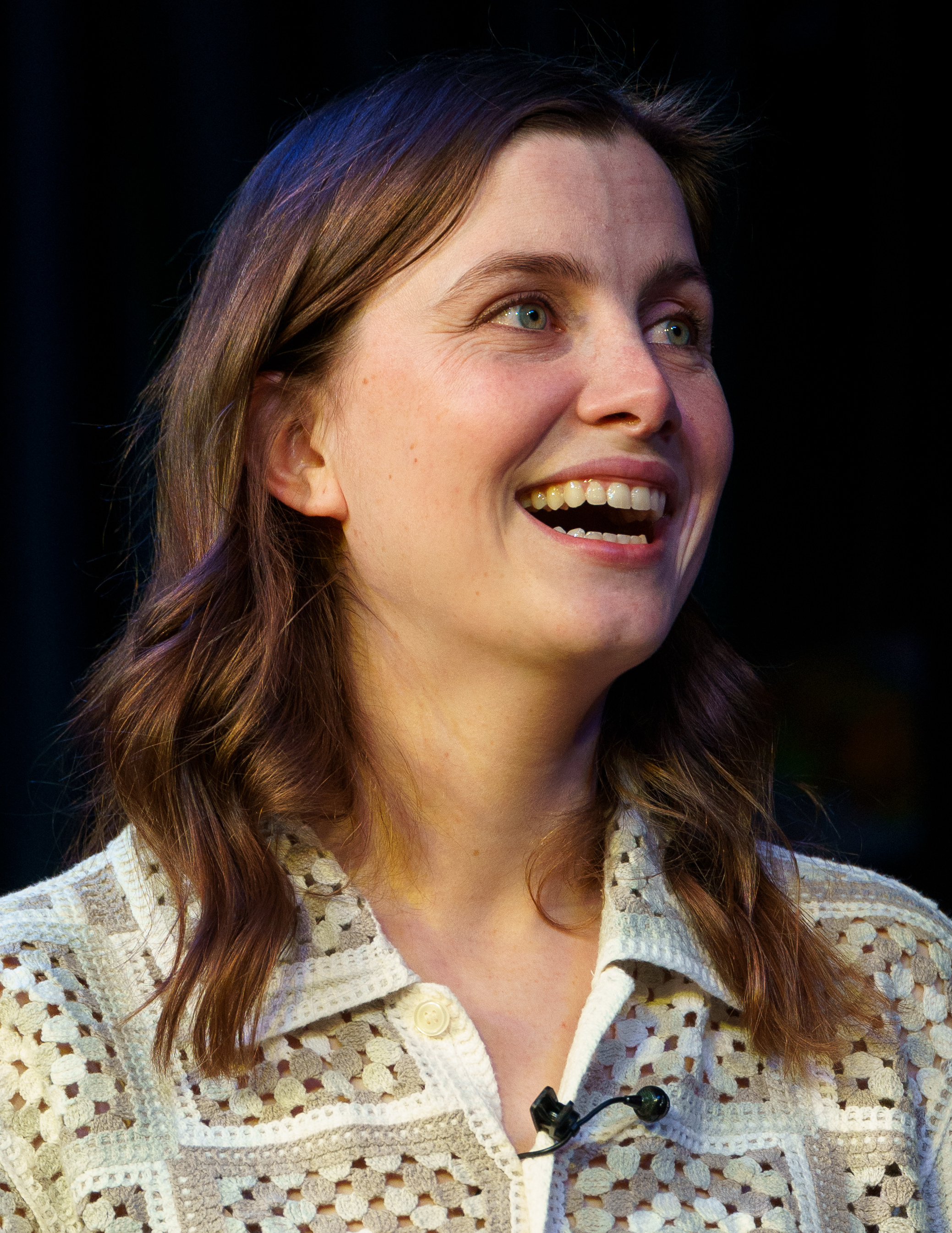
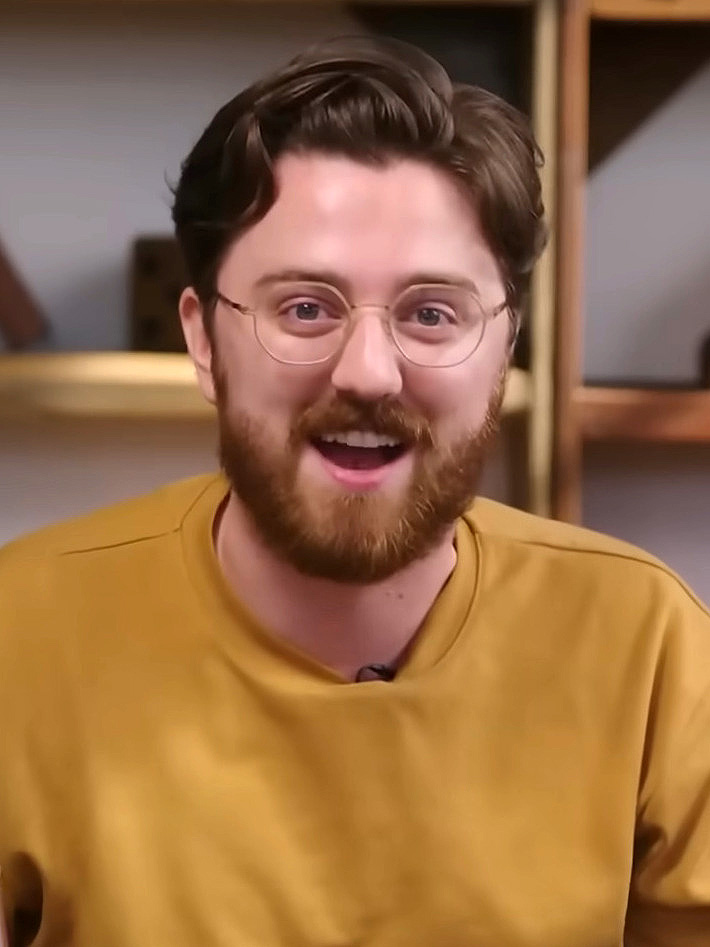
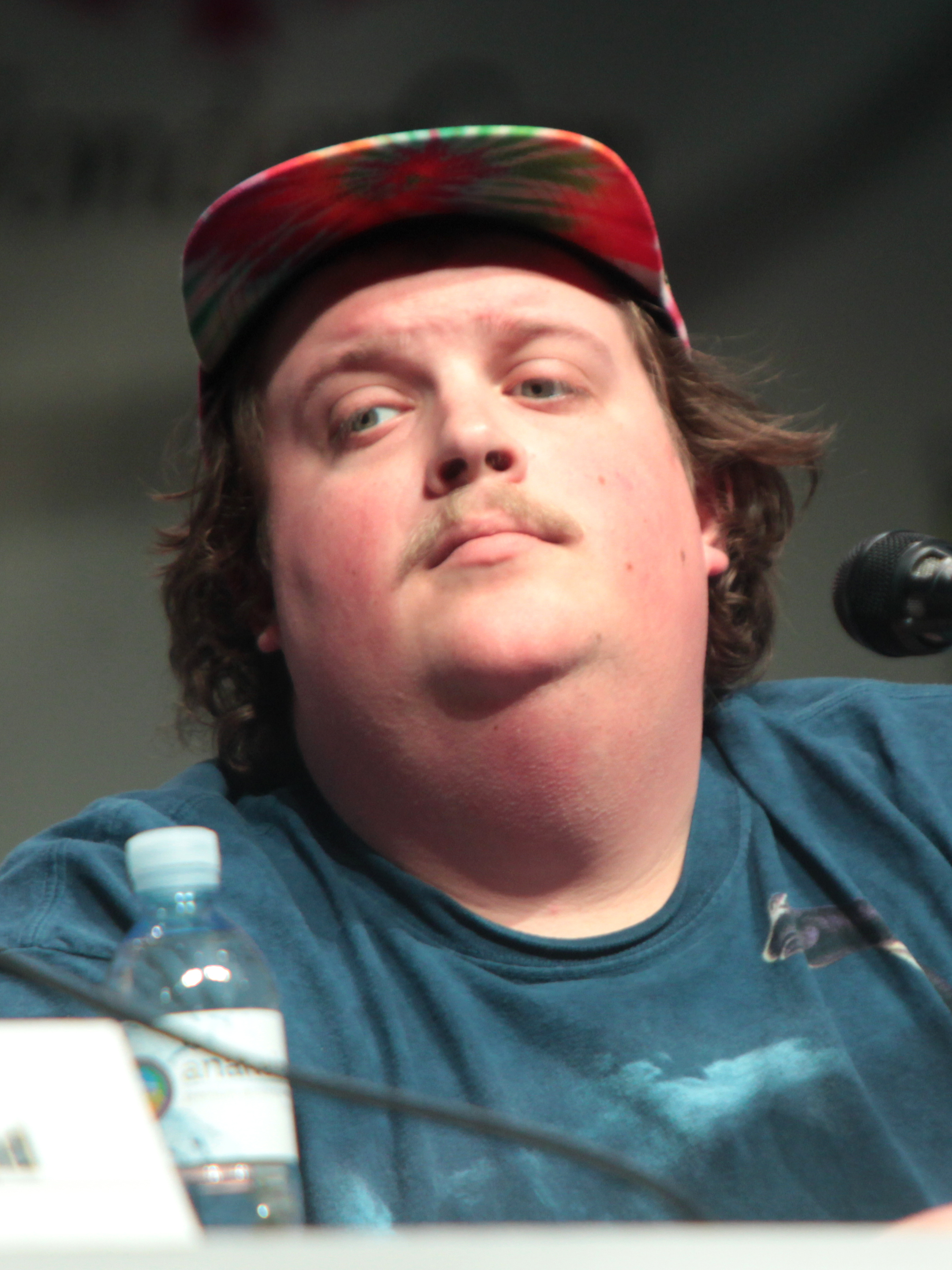
Clockwise from upper left: Lou Wilson, Vic Michaelis, Jacob Wysocki, Brian David Gilbert.

Dropout productions often feature common rotating talent from a roster of performers, including:

- Demi Adejuyigbe
- Mano Agapion
- Emily Axford
- Ally Beardsley
- Kimia Behpoornia
- Ross Bryant
- Elaine Carroll
- Raphael Chestang
- Adam Conover
- Ryan Creamer
- Jeremy Culhane
- Lily Du
- Jon Gabrus
- Anna Garcia
- Angela Giarratana
- Brian David Gilbert
- Lisa Gilroy
- Chris Grace
- Erika Ishii
- Aabria Iyengar
- Jiavani
- Katie Marovitch
- Patrick McDonald
- Jess McKenna
- Christine Medrano
- Matthew Mercer
- Vic Michaelis
- Monét X Change
- Oscar Montoya
- Brennan Lee Mulligan
- Brian K. Murphy
- Jordan Myrick
- Jacquis Neal
- Zeke Nicholson
- Ify Nwadiwe
- Grant O'Brien
- Zac Oyama
- Carolyn Page
- Hannah Pilkes
- Sam Reich
- Zach Reino
- Paul Robalino
- Izzy Roland
- Jess Ross
- Josh Ruben
- Becca Scott
- Rashawn Nadine Scott
- Rekha Shankar
- Alex Song-Xia
- Talia Tabin
- Caldwell Tanner
- Ruha Taslimi
- Siobhan Thompson
- Paul F. Tompkins
- Mike Trapp
- Persephone Valentine
- Amy Vorpahl
- Corin Wells
- Lou Wilson
- Ele Woods (Note: /ˈɛliː/ EL-ee)
- Jacob Wysocki
- Tao Yang

Dropout also frequently features performers from across other online content platforms, including Smosh, StarKid Productions, and The Try Guys.

== Original shows ==
Shows on Dropout are usually released fortnightly, a schedule used more often for podcasts than for television. Dropout planned to release a new original title per month in 2019, according to Sam Reich. By 2020, the service had retired all scripted shows in favor of cheaper and more successful unscripted content.

Dirty Laundry, Play It By Ear, and Make Some Noise, each spun off from Game Changer, premiered throughout 2022. In 2023, Dropout started airing the improvisational interview show Very Important People, and in 2024 six new shows premiered: Smartypants, Thousandaires, Dropout Presents, Monét's Slumber Party, Gastronauts, and Nobody Asked.

A show called Parlor Room, hosted by Becca Scott, was announced in March 2025 and premiered on April 18, 2025. A fourth Game Changer spinoff, Crowd Control, premiered on September 8, 2025.

As of October 2025, an untitled animated show was in development. A livestream channel titled Dropout 24/7, which airs Dropout shows continuously, launched on February 18, 2026; this channel is exclusive to the Dropout platform. The channel began with a marathon of Dimension 20.

=== Current and upcoming ===
Title	Genre	Description	Premiere	Status	Seasons, episodes	Approx. length	Ref.
Dimension 20	Actual play	Comedians and actors play tabletop role-playing games, primarily run by Brennan Lee Mulligan.	Sep 12, 2018	Upcoming	29 seasons 312 eps	120 mins	
Adventuring Academy	Talk show	Brennan Lee Mulligan and a guest discuss topics related to running tabletop roleplaying games.	Dec 19, 2018	Upcoming	7 seasons 74 eps	90 mins	
Game Changer	Game show, parody	A game show hosted by Sam Reich, in which players do not initially know the rules or premise.	Sep 20, 2019	Upcoming	8 seasons 81 eps	45 mins	
Dimension 20's Adventuring Party	Aftershow	A talkback show in which the cast of Dimension 20 discuss the most recent episode.	Apr 14, 2020	Upcoming	25 seasons 253 eps	30 mins	
Make Some Noise	Improv, panel show	Three contestants improvise scenes based on prompts provided by host Sam Reich.	Jun 13, 2022	Airing	5 seasons 79 eps	30 mins	
Very Important People (Note: Reboot of the Hello, My Name Is... (2010) CollegeHumor web-series.)	Talk show, parody	Improvisers given elaborate costumes and make-up are interviewed in-character by host Vic Michaelis.	Dec 15, 2023	Upcoming	3 seasons 45 eps	20 mins	
Smartypants	Seminar, parody	Comedians present on unusual subjects to a society of their peers, led by host Rekha Shankar.	Apr 25, 2024	Airing	3 seasons 39 eps	30 mins	
Crowd Control	Stand-up	Hosted by Jacquis Neal, a group of comedians perform crowd work, making jokes relating to unique facts about each audience member.	Sep 8, 2025	Airing	2 seasons 16 eps	40 mins	
Toonout	Animation	A series of original animated shorts by various animators.	Mar 24, 2026	Airing	1 season 25 eps	4 mins	
MP3	Comedy, parody	A parody of music video countdown shows such as Total Request Live, hosted by Jeremy Culhane, Aparna Nancherla, and Skye Townsend.	Nov 4, 2026	Airing	1 season 3 eps	TBD	

=== Inactive ===
The following shows have either formally concluded or have not announced further production or future release.

Title	Genre	Description	Originally aired		Seasons, episodes	Approx. length	Ref.
Title	Genre	Description	First	Last	Seasons, episodes	Approx. length	Ref.
Parlor Room	Game show	A comedian gathers a group of friends to play one of their favorite board games or card games, hosted by Becca Scott.	Apr 18, 2025	Sep 3, 2026	2 seasons 24 eps	50 mins	
Um, Actually	Game show	Contestants correct the host's inaccurate pop culture statements; hosted by Mike Trapp (Note: seasons 1–8 (2018–2023) and the CollegeHumor web series (2015)) / Ify Nwadiwe, (Note: seasons 9-11 (2024–2026)) with fact checking by Michael Saltzman (Note: seasons 4–8 (2020–2023)) / Brian David Gilbert.	Sep 28, 2018	Jun 16, 2026	11 seasons 174 eps	30 mins	
Dropout Presents	Stand-up, improv	A series of stand-up comedy, solo shows, and improv specials performed in front of a live audience.	June 21, 2024	March 27, 2026	12 specials	60 mins	
Gastronauts	Cooking show	A cooking competition hosted by creator and showrunner Jordan Myrick, in which professional chefs create meals based on specifications given by a panel of comedians.	Oct 11, 2024	Dec 19, 2025	2 seasons 16 eps	40 mins	
Dirty Laundry	Game show, talk show	Four contestants play a social deduction game based on "never have I ever", where players are told secrets about each other and must guess who each secret belongs to. Hosted by Lily Du and co-hosted by bartender Grant O'Brien.	Apr 11, 2022	Dec 16, 2025	5 seasons 55 eps	40 mins	
Nobody Asked	Documentary	Brian David Gilbert, Oscar Montoya, Ify Nwadiwe, Rekha Shankar, and Ele Woods run experiments to answer ridiculous questions.	Nov 29, 2024	Jan 24, 2025	1 season 5 eps	30 mins	
Breaking News: No Laugh Newsroom	Newscast, parody	Four "newscasters" read silly or strange reports from a teleprompter, losing points when they laugh.	Jul 7, 2018	Oct 15, 2024	7 seasons 108 eps	10 mins	
Monét's Slumber Party	Panel show, variety show	A variety show hosted by Monét X Change.	Jul 19, 2024	Sep 27, 2024	1 season 6 eps	30 mins	
Thousandaires	Panel show	Comedians each spend $1,000 on a group activity, with the host awarding their favorite a $1,000 prize.	May 31, 2024	Aug 9, 2024	1 season 6 eps	30 mins	
Play It By Ear	Musical improv	Jess McKenna, Zach Reino and guests improvise a musical using prompts from host Mano Agapion.	Sep 13, 2022	Nov 3, 2023	2 seasons 16 eps	40 mins	
Erotic Clubhouse	Comedy	A spinoff of Erotic Book Club, in which Jess Ross and Rekha Shankar write erotic fanfiction.	Jun 25, 2020	Dec 17, 2020	1 season 10 eps	60 mins	
Where in the Eff is Sarah Cincinnati	Game show	A parody of Where in the World Is Carmen Sandiego? hosted by Rekha Shankar, in which players use geography knowledge to locate Sarah Cincinnati (Christine Medrano).	Dec 18, 2019	Jan 22, 2020	1 season 6 eps	20 mins	
Ultramechatron Team Go!	Comedy	A parody of mecha anime and manga, featuring four pilots in a giant robot battling aliens.	Oct 3, 2019	Dec 12, 2019	1 season 11 eps	15 mins	
Gods of Food	Mockumentary	A mockumentary in the style of Chef's Table, which follows the careers of unusual chefs.	Aug 8, 2019	Sep 12, 2019	1 season 6 eps	20 mins	
Kingpin Katie	Crime comedy	Katie Marovitch unwittingly becomes a high-profile drug dealer, in a satire of event television such as Breaking Bad.	Jun 10, 2019	Jul 29, 2019	1 season 8 eps	15 mins	
Paranoia	Game show	A social deduction game hosted by Ally Beardsley, in which two players are secretly under the influence of marijuana.	Apr 20, 2019	Dec 31, 2019	2 seasons 15 eps	20 mins	
Troopers	Comedy	A parody of sci-fi films such as Star Wars, which continues the 2011 series but focuses on new characters.	Apr 8, 2019	Jun 3, 2019	1 season 9 eps	15 mins	
The Rank Room	Talk show	A panel provide possible answers to a question provided by host Katie Marovitch, then rank them.	Mar 7, 2019	Jun 20, 2019	1 season 17 eps	20 mins	
Total Forgiveness	Reality	Ally Beardsley and Grant O'Brien exchange difficult dares to win money to pay off their student loans.	Feb 6, 2019	Apr 10, 2019	1 season 10 eps	20 mins	
WTF 101	Adult animation	A teacher (Mary Pat Gleason) educates students on gross and disturbing subjects. Parodies The Magic School Bus	Jan 7, 2019	Mar 11, 2019	1 season 10 eps	10 mins	
Erotic Book Club	Comedy	A book club show in which hosts Jess Ross and Rekha Shankar plus guests read and discuss online erotic stories.	Dec 29, 2018	Sep 14, 2019	1 season 19 eps	60 mins	
Raph's Hall of Fame	Talk show	Host Raph Chestang discusses sports with guests.	Dec 24, 2018	May 6, 2019	1 season 10 eps	30 mins	
Lonely and Horny	Comedy	A continuation of the 2016 Jake and Amir webseries Lonely and Horny. The series was removed from Dropout in 2019.	Nov 5, 2018	Jan 21, 2019	1 season 10 eps	10 mins	
Cartoon Hell	Animated series	An animated series in which stars Caldwell Tanner and Nathan Yaffe draw cartoons based on suggestions. Based on the YouTube channel Drawfee, originally hosted by Tanner and Yaffe.	Sep 26, 2018	Jun 19, 2019	2 seasons 36 eps	20 mins	
See Plum Run	Comedy	A child beauty pageant contestant (Elaine Carroll) and her mother (Josh Ruben) in a continuation of 2013 CollegeHumor series Precious Plum. Satirizes Here Comes Honey Boo Boo.	Sep 26, 2018	Nov 19, 2018	1 season 12 eps	15 mins	

== Live shows and tours ==
=== Dropout Presents ===
Dropout Presents is a series of recorded live shows by different comedians and improv groups.

List of Dropout Presents episodes
No.	Title	Starring	Release date	Length	Filming date(s)	Venue
1	Pissing Out Cancer	Hank Green	Jun 21, 2024	61 min		Dynasty Typewriter
2	Bigger! With Brennan and Izzy	Brennan Lee Mulligan, Izzy Roland	Jul 25, 2024	45 min	Feb 25, 2024 Feb 26, 2024	The Elysian
3	As Scarlett Johansson	Chris Grace	Aug 23, 2024	64 min	Feb 23, 2024	The Elysian
4	Unmedicated	Adam Conover	Sep 18, 2024	53 min		Nocturne Theater
5	Vanessa 5000	Courtney Pauroso	Oct 18, 2024	65 min	Feb 24, 2024	The Elysian
6	From Ally to Zacky	Ally Beardsley, Kimia Behpoornia, Devin Field, Victoria Longwell, Oscar Montoya, Zac Oyama, Talia Tabin, Jacob Wysocki	Nov 15, 2024 Feb 21, 2025 (Note: From Ally to Zacky: A Bonus Tracky.)	42 min	Feb 25, 2024	The Elysian
7	The Big Team	Ronnie Adrian, Zeke Nicholson, Ify Nwadiwe, Ishmel Sahid, Carl Tart, Lamar Woods	Dec 16, 2024	27 min	Feb 26, 2024	The Elysian
8	Four Pills	Cameron Esposito	Apr 11, 2025	62 min	Dec 9, 2024	
9	Demi Adejuyigbe Is Going To Do One (1) Backflip	Demi Adejuyigbe	Nov 19, 2025	72 min	Jul 10, 2025	The Colony Theatre
10	Hopeful Potato	Aparna Nancherla	Dec 15, 2025	77 min	Jul 1, 2025	Garry Marshall Theater
11	The Best Man Show	Mark Vigeant	Feb 25, 2026	58 min	Jul 7, 2025	The Cat's Crawl
12	Sorry For Your Loss	Michael Cruz Kayne	Mar 27, 2026	68 min	Jul 29, 2025	Minetta Lane Theatre

=== Dropout Improv ===
Dropout Improv is an improvisational comedy tour featuring regular Dropout performers, which has toured both North America and the United Kingdom.

A panel event called "Cue the Chaos: In Convo with Dropout Improv" took place at the Just for Laughs comedy festival in Montreal on July 26, 2025. Sam Reich also appeared at a "fireside chat" on July 24 as one of the festival's more exclusive "ComedyPRO" events.

Dates for a Dropout Improv tour in Australia and New Zealand are scheduled in 2026 for Perth, Sydney, Melbourne, and Auckland.

== Awards and nominations ==
Dropout's show Very Important People was the People's Voice Winner in the video comedy category at the 2024 Webby Awards.
