= Dave Horwitz =

American comedian, blogger and television writer (born 1983)

- Born: August 19, 1983 (age 43); Boston, Massachusetts, United States
- Education: Emerson College
- Occupations: Writer; comedian
- Website: theidiotking.tumblr.com

Dave Horwitz (born August 19, 1983) is an American comedian, blogger and television writer. He is a graduate of Emerson College in Boston.

== Life and career ==
Along with Marisa Pinson, Horwitz co-created the blog "Dealbreaker", described as an “hilarious reference guide to the qualities that, when discovered, transform the ‘date you hope to go home with’ into the ‘date you pray never calls again’”. The blog eventually found success outside of the Internet. It was turned into a book, optioned by Radar Pictures and later bought by ABC Television and producer Nahnatchka Khan for further development on television. He also co-created the web series "Downers Grove" along with Michael Blaiklock, Justin Becker, and Elisha Yaffe for Warner Brothers.

He frequently performs at the Upright Citizens Brigade theater in Los Angeles with his sketch group A Kiss From Daddy. He wrote on the first season of ABC's Don't Trust the B— in Apartment 23 and on the only season of How to Live with Your Parents (for the Rest of Your Life), on ABC.
