= How to Live with Your Parents (For the Rest of Your Life) =

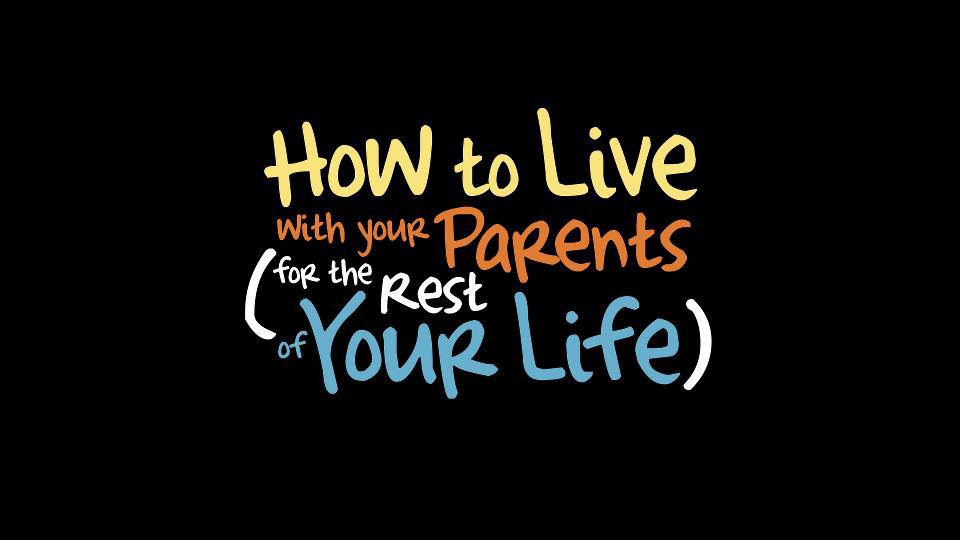
- Genre: Sitcom
- Created by: Claudia Lonow
- Starring: Sarah Chalke; Elizabeth Perkins; Jon Dore; Rachel Eggleston; Stephanie Hunt; Brad Garrett
- Narrated by: Sarah Chalke
- Music by: Diana Extein; Josh Kramon
- Country of origin: United States
- Original language: English
- No. of seasons: 1
- No. of episodes: 13

Production
- Executive producers: Brian Grazer; Francie Calfo; Claudia Lonow
- Producer: Ken Ornstein
- Cinematography: Michael Trim; Mark Doerling-Howell
- Camera setup: single-camera
- Running time: 21–23 minutes
- Production companies: Imagine Television; Hot Lava Girl Productions; 20th Century Fox Television

Original release
- Network: ABC
- Release: April 3 – June 26, 2013

How to Live with Your Parents (For the Rest of Your Life) is an American single-camera sitcom created by Accidentally on Purpose creator Claudia Lonow that aired on ABC from April 3 to June 26, 2013. The series was produced by 20th Century Fox Television and stars Sarah Chalke as Polly who – along with her daughter – ends up moving into her parents' house because of the 2008 financial crisis and her divorce. On May 10, 2013, How to Live with Your Parents (For the Rest of Your Life) was canceled by ABC after one season.

== Premise ==
The series follows a single and very uptight divorced mother, Polly (Chalke) who finds herself moving back in with her parents, Elaine and Max (Elizabeth Perkins and Brad Garrett), upon leaving her husband and due to the economic downturn. Polly's parents are laid back and relaxed, but the return is not as smooth and transitional as she thinks while having to deal with not only her parents and their lifestyle, but also with a best friend whom she almost dated and an ex-husband who wants her back.

== Cast and characters ==
- Sarah Chalke as Polly, a divorced mother.
- Elizabeth Perkins as Elaine Green, Polly's mother and Natalie's grandmother.
- Brad Garrett as Max Green, Elaine's husband and Polly's step-father.
- Rachel Eggleston as Natalie Tatham, Polly's daughter and Elaine's granddaughter.
- Jon Dore as Julian Tatham, Polly's ex-husband.
- Stephanie Hunt as Jenn, Polly's co-worker and friend.

== Development and production ==
In January 2012, ABC placed a pilot order for How to Live with Your Parents (For the Rest of Your Life). Claudia Lonow wrote the pilot episode, and serves as showrunner and head writer. Lonow also executive produces the series alongside Brian Grazer and Francie Calfo, under their production company Imagine Entertainment.

Casting announcements began in February 2012, with Sarah Chalke first cast in the lead role of Polly, the recently divorced mother who moves back in with her parents. Jon Dore then joined the series in the role of Julian, Polly's ex-husband. Following Dore, Elizabeth Perkins signed on to play the role of Elaine, Polly's optimistic and outspoken mother. Next to board the series was Rachel Eggleston as Natalie, Polly and Julian's six-year-old daughter. Brad Garrett then joined the series as Max, Polly's stepfather, who owns a successful chain of nightclubs. Rebecca Delgado Smith boarded the series in the role of Jenn, Polly's co-worker who occasionally helps Polly with her dating problems. Orlando Jones completed the main cast in the series when he signed on to play the role of Gregg, Polly's married best friend and co-worker.

On May 11, 2012, ABC placed a series order for the comedy. Shortly after the series order was placed, Rebecca Delgado Smith and Orlando Jones were dropped from the cast. Smith's role was subsequently recast with Stephanie Hunt. The series went into production early and the first season was completed by November 2012.

== Episodes ==
No.	Title	Directed by	Written by	Original release date	Prod. code	US viewers (millions)
1	"Pilot"	Julie Anne Robinson	Claudia Lonow	April 3, 2013	1AVT79	8.44
Polly, and her daughter Natalie, move in with her mother, Elaine (Elizabeth Perkins), and step-father, Max (Brad Garrett), after she leaves her husband when she finds that he can't do anything right. Six months after moving in with them she finds that her now ex-husband, Julian, won't stop coming by their house. Polly then gets asked out on a date, but is reluctant to go on one when she finds she'll be a hypocrite because she called her mother a slut for dating after her divorce; Max finds it hard to adjust to only having one testicle after his battle with testicular cancer. Polly's date doesn't go as planned when she lets her date have a drink and then finds that he's an alcoholic; Max gets angry with Julian when he finds that he's been stealing his cream soda, prompting Julian to leave him a box of cream soda at his doorstep.
2	"How to Get Off the Couch"	Alex Hardcastle	Matt Flanagan & David McHugh	April 10, 2013	1AVT06	7.33
Polly suffers a back injury and Elaine and Max must watch Natalie while Polly recovers. Meanwhile, Elaine and Max are getting tired of seeing Julian after the divorce and tell him to scram.
3	"How to Live With the Academy Awards Party"	Rodman Flender	Jonathan Schmock	April 17, 2013	1AVT05	6.06
Polly invites her college crush to Elaine and Max's Academy Awards party, where Max is fighting with Elaine's brother.
4	"How to Not Screw Up Your Kid"	Bryan Gordon	Gregg Mettler	April 24, 2013	1AVT04	4.81
Natalie creates an imaginary bully named Betsy in order to deal with Polly and Julian's divorce. Meanwhile, Max is reluctant to visit his dying aunt Florence, with Elaine.
5	"How to Run the Show"	Reggie Hudlin	Dave Horwitz & Marisa Pinson	May 1, 2013	1AVT07	6.20
Max and Elaine foolishly lose Natalie while babysitting her.
6	"How to Fix Up Your Ex"	Michael Patrick Jann	Franklin Hardy & Shane Kosakowski	May 8, 2013	1AVT08	5.90
Polly helps Julian get a date with a sophisticated lawyer.
7	"How to Stand On Your Own Two Feet"	Peter Lauer	Ira Ungerleider	May 15, 2013	1AVT11	6.14
When Polly finds out that Max and Elaine are the source of the money in Polly's bank account, she gets a second job to try and "pay the rent" Note: The show Max and Elaine are watching on TV at the beginning is ABC's Modern Family.
8	"How to Live With Your Parents for the Rest of Your Life"	Richie Keen	Claudia Lonow & Bill Kunstler	May 22, 2013	1AVT12	6.26
After several arguments between Polly and Max, Polly and Natalie move out of Max and Elaine's house and move into Julian's apartment, as Julian is staying with his new girlfriend, Olivia.
9	"How to Get Involved"	Phil Traill	Emily Cutler	May 29, 2013	1AVT02	4.12
Elaine and Max try to get involved with Polly and Natalie's lives. Elaine tries to build Polly's confidence and help her get a better job, while Max meddles with the school play Natalie is in.
10	"How to Have a Play Date"	Julie Ann Robinson	Claudia Lonow	June 5, 2013	1AVT01	3.86
Polly and Natalie become part of a group of moms and their daughters that all do play dates together. When Polly volunteers to host the next play date, Elaine tries to help out and winds up getting her ideas rejected by Polly. But as it turns out, Polly couldn't do things herself and makes up with Elaine. The play date turns out a success.
11	"How to Not Waste Money"	Michael Patrick Jann	Ira Ungerleider	June 12, 2013	1AVT03	4.06
After Max gets upset with Polly for charging $600 to his credit card, the two of them redeem a pack of spa coupons at the last minute. Meanwhile, Elaine loses her keys and it turns out that Max had them all along. Note: This episode aired out of production order, as Julian gets his job at the Frozen Yogurt Shop in this episode, a job he's had since the early parts of the series.
12	"How to Help the Needy"	Michael McDonald	Emily Cutler	June 19, 2013	1AVT09	3.35
It's Elaine's birthday, and she takes Polly to her birthday luncheon with her friends. However, a few flashback stories causes all of Elaine's friends to favor towards Polly...when they should be favoring Elaine. Elaine gets upset and Polly try's to cheer her up by getting her an audition for a small part in a movie. Throughout this small ordeal, Polly is helping out the homeless through her job at the Market. At the same time, Julian and Max want to build a playhouse for Natalie, and Natalie chooses Max's design ideas over Julian's as Max "knows what Natalie's into this week". When construction starts, Julian accidentally lurches forward with a saw and cuts one of Max's fingers off! After it's fixed in the Emergency Room, Julian becomes saddened by the possibility that the accident was intended. He grieves on the fact that Max now knows Natalie better since he's there for her every day. Max understands his sadness and promises that he can still have enough time with his own daughter. He also promises not to come between them too much and be more conscious of Julian's feelings. Note: This episode aired out of production order, as Natalie is shown using her playhouse in earlier episodes.
13	"How to Be Gifted"	Lev Spiro	Gregg Mettler	June 26, 2013	1AVT10	3.06
Polly hopes her daughter receives an orange folder to get into the gifted program.
