= Gastronauts =

American reality cooking show

- Genre: Cooking show
- Directed by: Morgan Evans
- Presented by: Jordan Myrick
- No. of seasons: 2
- No. of episodes: 16

Production
- Executive producers: David Kerns; Sam Reich; Jordan Myrick
- Editor: James Fitzpatrick
- Production company: Dropout

Original release
- Network: Dropout
- Release: October 11, 2024 – present

Gastronauts is an American reality television cooking competition produced and aired on Dropout, hosted by Jordan Myrick. The show follows three chefs competing against each other, cooking food based on prompts from a panel of comedians. The show premiered on October 11, 2024, and episodes were released every other week. As of August 2025, there have been two seasons, with 16 episodes in total.

== Format ==
In each episode, three chefs compete against each other, cooking food for a panel of comedians and Myrick. Each round, one comedian gives a prompt that the dish must follow, such as making the dish "heavy," "the blandest dish you can imagine," or "horny". The competition continues, having one round per comedian, and after all the rounds end the comedians debate amongst themselves which chef should win. Whichever chef wins is rewarded a prop made to look like pieces of the moon. Then, the comedians are judged by the chefs based on how interesting or fun the challenges were, and the winning comedian is rewarded a prop made to look like a piece of the sun.

== Production ==
The show's idea was brought up by Dropout CEO Sam Reich in an attempt to air new shows on Dropout. The idea was also brought up by Lily Du, Luke Field, and Rekha Shankar. Myrick, first believing Reich's eagerness to do a cooking show was a joke, received an email requesting them (Note: Myrick uses they/them and she/her pronouns. This article uses they/them for consistency.) to be the host and creative producer of the show.

Myrick stated in an interview with Polygon that they wanted a variety of chefs and comedians on the show, having chefs of different culinary and professional backgrounds, also saying that they wanted chefs "who actively want extra attention, which some chefs really do and some chefs really don’t". Speaking about the comedians, they said that they think "having a mix of people that had varying levels of skill and also varying levels of interest was important".

The show's first season premiered on October 11, 2024, and season two premiered on August 15, 2025, with episodes being released every other week. Season two finished production in March 2025, and the season was filmed over the course of five days.

== Episodes ==
=== Series overview ===
Season	Episodes	Originally released	
Season	Episodes	First released	Last released
1	6	October 11, 2024	December 20, 2024
2	10	August 15, 2025	December 19, 2025

=== Season 1 (2024) ===
No. overall	No. in season	Title	Judges	Chefs	Original release date
1	1	"Make Love, Not S'mores"	Brennan Lee Mulligan, Oscar Montoya, Isabella Roland	Mark Esposito, Jessica Tiffany Luevano, Trevor Ross	October 11, 2024
2	2	"Slurpin' and Glurpin'"	Lily Du, Ify Nwadiwe, Grant O'Brian	Patrick Costa, Angel Ortega, Kat Turner	October 25, 2024
3	3	"I Find That Very A-Peeling"	Elaine Carroll, Kendahl Landreth, Sam Reich	Kenneth Anderson, Harrison Bader, Lauren Lawless	November 8, 2024
4	4	"Tossed Salad and Scrambled Eggs"	Luke Field, Jess Ross, Rekha Shankar	Arturo Avallone, Cici Celia, Jeromy Wright	November 22, 2024
5	5	"Clear Eyes, Mouth Wide, Can't Lose"	Brian David Gilbert, Chris Grace, Mike Trapp	Kyndra McCrary, Joshua Mouzakes, Catie Randazzo	December 6, 2024
6	6	"Don't Knock It Till You Drop It"	Vic Michaelis, Zac Oyama, Jacob Wysocki	Pratik Bhakta, Dom Crisp, Samantha Quintero	December 20, 2024

=== Season 2 (2025) ===
No. overall	No. in season	Title	Judges	Chefs	Original release date
7	1	"Too Goo to Be True"	Raphael Chestang, Katie Marovitch, Tao Yang	Cris Brown, Solomon Johnson, Emily Lim	August 15, 2025
8	2	"A Bone-afide Delight"	Tommy Bowe, Angela Giarratana, Amanda Lehan-Canto	Joi Fowler, Max Rappaport, Irene Walton	August 29, 2025
9	3	"Let's Get Physical"	Cameron Esposito, Kendahl Landreth, John Milhiser	Jennifer Felmley, Amanda Palomino, Saransh Oberoi	September 12, 2025
10	4	"I'll Know It When I Taste It"	Scott Aukerman, Lauren Lapkus, Paul F. Tompkins	Chris Binotto, Beeta Mohajeri, Anthony Rodriguez	September 26, 2025
11	5	"Car-Rib-Bean"	Erika Ishii, Becca Scott, Persephone Valentine	Shieya Beth Evans, Ashley Morgan, Jenn de la Vega	October 10, 2025
12	6	"Now That's a Good Chef, Yum!"	Demi Adejuyigbe, Kimia Behpoornia, Jeremy Culhane	Raquel Fleetwood, Amanda Rios, Christopher Sanchez	October 24, 2025
13	7	"Business in the Front, Party in the Back"	Landon Cider, Kim Chi, Logan "Meatball" Jennings	Patrick Murray, Charlie Ray, Kat Williams	November 7, 2025
14	8	"Doggone Good"	Luenell Campbell, Jon Gabrus, Lisa Gilroy	Adrian Castro, Courtney Wright, Ara Zada	November 21, 2025
15	9	"The World Is Your Beard"	Emily Axford, Ally Beardsley, Siobhan Thompson	Maia Domingues, Tiana Gee, Christina Xenos	December 5, 2025
16	10	"Incog-Eato"	Keith Habersberger, Zach Kornfeld, Jonny Manganello	David Bartnes, Sid Blackwell, Marcus Ponder	December 19, 2025
