= Game Changer (game show) =

American comedy game show

- Genre: Game show; Comedy
- Created by: Sam Reich
- Written by: Sam Reich; Paul Robalino; Chloe Badner; Ryan Creamer
- Directed by: Sam Reich; Kyle Rohrbach; Sam Geer
- Presented by: Sam Reich
- Theme music composer: Harper Rey
- Opening theme: "Sem Você"
- Ending theme: "You" (Instrumental)
- Country of origin: United States
- Original language: English
- No. of seasons: 8
- No. of episodes: 81

Production
- Executive producers: Sam Reich; David Kerns; Adam Frucci; Kyle Rohrbach; Chloe Badner; Paul Robalino; Brennan Lee Mulligan; Sam Geer
- Producers: Kyle Rohrbach; Justin Cyrul
- Editors: Noah Wagner; Sam Geer; Eve Hinz
- Camera setup: Multi-camera
- Running time: 12–64 minutes
- Production company: Dropout

Original release
- Network: Dropout
- Release: September 20, 2019 – present

Related
- Make Some Noise

Game Changer is an American comedy panel game show on Dropout created and hosted by Sam Reich which started in 2019. The show follows players, typically three comedians, who participate in a new game every episode, with the players kept unaware of the premise and rules of the game beforehand. According to Polygon, the show "combines improv comedy, puzzle solving, fierce competition, and a prankster ethos." Episodes of Game Changer have led to four spinoff shows on Dropout: Dirty Laundry, Make Some Noise, Play It By Ear, and Crowd Control. The show's eighth season aired from May to September 2026.

== Premise ==
The show is based on one central theme: the players start the game knowing nothing about it. Most episodes follow three contestants playing against each other by following prompts and tasks put out by the host of the show, Sam Reich. It also sometimes parodies other shows like Survivor and The Bachelor.

Occasionally, special guests will participate in the game. The very first episode featured the participants' significant others, and the inclusion of guests outside of the Dropout/CollegeHumor community began with the virtually filmed third season, which featured guests such as Tony Hawk, Michael Winslow, and Giancarlo Esposito. Other guests have included Jewel, Ty Mitchell, Bob the Drag Queen, Laganja Estranja, Howie Mandel, Victor Yerrid, Sarah Natochenny, Eric Wareheim, Paul F. Tompkins, Robert Reich (Sam’s father), Alex Horne, Nick Kocher, Devin Stone, Ron Perlman, Maria Bamford, and Kumail Nanjiani.

== Production ==
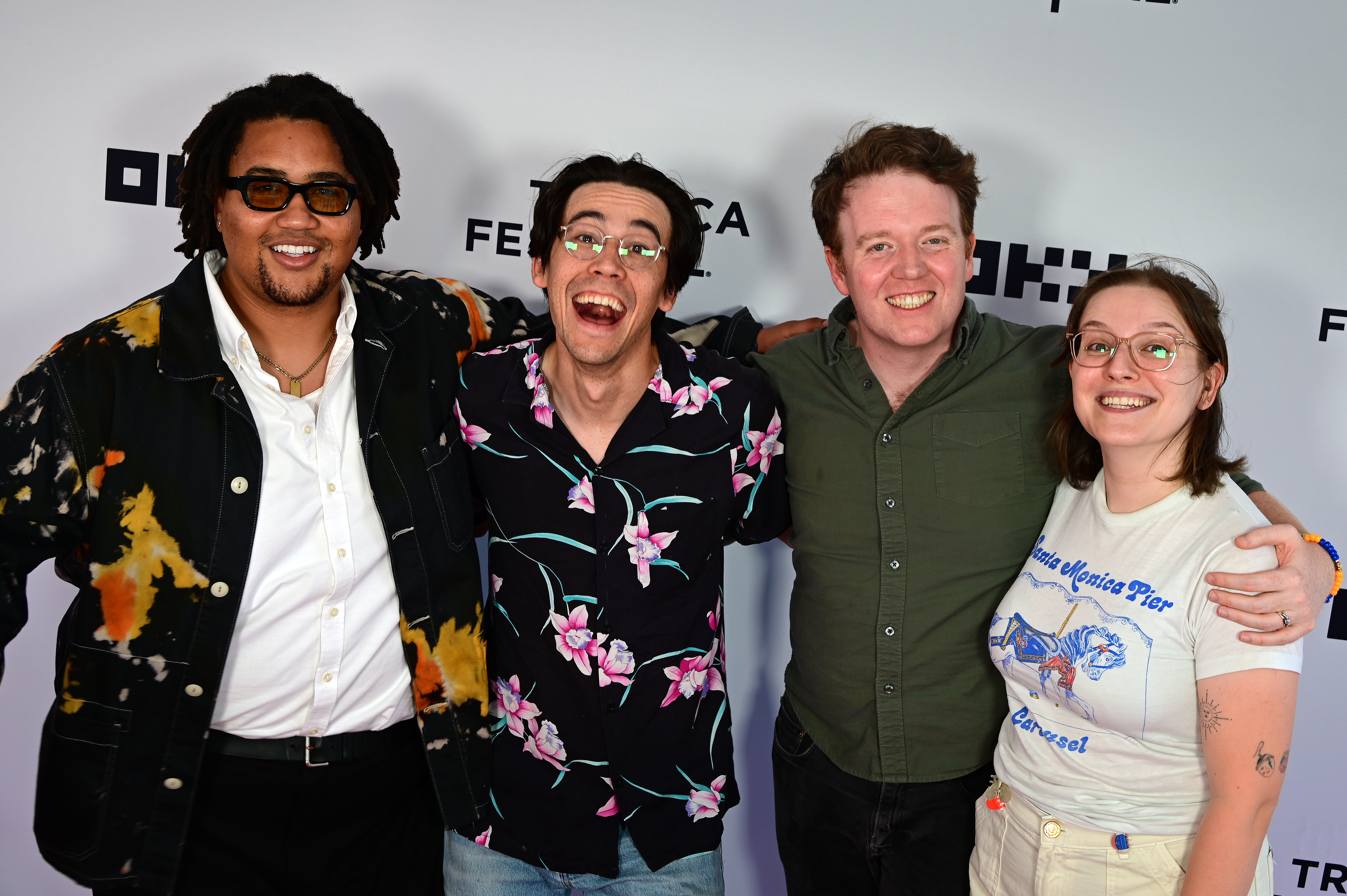
Lou Wilson, Zac Oyama, Brennan Lee Mulligan, and Isabella Roland (L–R) have each appeared in multiple Game Changer episodes.

Game Changer was created as an original show for the streaming service Dropout, in response to internal pressure to create more inexpensive, unscripted content compared to CollegeHumor's previous output. Early in development, the show was titled What the What and based loosely on the party game "Scissors". The show was announced on August 29, 2019 and released on September 20, 2019.

After CollegeHumor was sold by IAC and restructured in 2020, the company temporarily halted production of all shows. Game Changer, which was affected by this, released their already-completed second season in January. The third season of the show was recorded via video conference to comply with lockdown restrictions in California during the COVID-19 pandemic; the show returned to being recorded in the studio for its fourth season. Originally, nine episodes were announced as being a part of the fifth season ahead of the season premiere in November 2022, with a 10th episode being a cut-for-time special. However, in March 2023, a special 4-part season finale titled "Game Changer: Battle Royale" was announced, with the mini-series being a sequel to season 4's Survivor-style season finale. Beginning with the fifth season, behind-the-scenes videos are uploaded for each episode the week after their release. Seasons 4 and 5 each concluded with "cut for time" specials featuring moments that were cut from the episodes; these moments were later integrated into the behind-the-scenes videos from season 6 onward.

During the 2023 SAG-AFTRA strike, production on the sixth season of Game Changer as well as most Dropout programming shut down, as the show fell "under SAG's Electronic Media contract". In July 2023, Sam Reich stated that as Dropout is not "associated with the AMPTP, it's possible we may be able to reach an interim agreement with SAG that allows us to continue to produce content during the strike. But we'll only do that, obviously, if we get the blessing of the union and the buy-in of our performers. If not, we have enough content in the can to last us a little past the end of the year". In August 2023, Reich announced that all Dropout shows had resumed production, as it was determined that their "New Media Agreement for Non-Dramatic Programming" was actually a non-struck SAG-AFTRA contract.

Game Changer editor Sam Geer, who also directed season 6's episodes, was promoted to executive producer in 2024. The set was expanded for the filming of season 7. Reich commented that one of the production limitations of the previous set was the stage curtain entrance so this set expansion featured a new "grand entrance" to "wheel the most elaborate stuff out onto that stage". Reich stated, "the open play space and the distance between the cameras and us are so massive that to be on the stage this season, it felt a little bit like there weren't cameras in the room. ... I think that contributed to a bit of just how free we felt as performers".

Season 7 featured off-set filming and two episodes with studio audiences. Belen Edwards of Mashable explained that "multiple Season 7 episodes have made fans a part of the game" and that "either unknowingly or knowingly, Game Changer is bringing its fans into the game". Edwards highlighted a challenge in "One Year Later" which "involved creating the most profitable piece of Dropout merchandise, something fans only realized while watching the episode", the live audience for "Crowd Control", and the goal of creating the most viral videos in "Fool's Gold" where the "viewers will be able to keep affecting the episode's outcome" in the month after the episode aired. The season also featured an alternate reality game (ARG) component, with clues hidden in the episodes, in response to a mistaken belief by fans that an ARG was hidden in season 6. The game was solved by fans within 48 hours, ultimately unlocking the final episode of the season, one which had been planned by Brennan Lee Mulligan and other Dropout cast and crew members in secret to surprise Reich following the end of production on the other episodes.

Season 8 finished filming in November 2025 and premiered on May 18, 2026. A ninth season is in development.

On February 23, 2026, it was revealed that The Rookie would air an episode crossing over with Game Changer. The episode, "Fun and Games", aired on March 2, 2026, featuring Reich, Vic Michaelis, Jacob Wysocki, Zac Oyama, and Anna Garcia.

=== Spin-offs ===
Episodes of Game Changer have become the basis for a number of other shows on Dropout. In 2022, Dropout produced three spin-offs based on previous episodes: Dirty Laundry, a social deduction game where players guess each other's secrets, based on the season 3 episode "Never Have I Ever"; Make Some Noise, a short form improv show based on the season 1 episode and recurring game of the same name; and Play It by Ear, a musical improv show based on the season 4 episode "The Official Cast Recording." In 2025, Dropout premiered Crowd Control, a stand-up crowd work series based on the season 7 episode of the same name.

=== Home media ===
On February 6, 2026, Reich announced that the first two seasons would be available for purchase on Blu-ray, as a physical media release by Dropout.

== Episodes ==
=== Series overview ===
Season	Episodes	Originally released	
Season	Episodes	First released	Last released
1	5	September 20, 2019	October 18, 2019
2	6	February 25, 2020	May 8, 2020
3	15	September 15, 2020	April 16, 2021
4	11	November 1, 2021	April 4, 2022
5	14	November 14, 2022	May 15, 2023
6	9	February 12, 2024	June 17, 2024
7	11	April 7, 2025	August 25, 2025
8	10	May 18, 2026	September 21, 2026

=== Season 1 (2019) ===
No. overall	No. in season	Title	Contestants	Original release date
1	1	"Lie Detector"	Brennan Lee Mulligan, Jess Ross, Tao Yang	September 20, 2019
The players must answer intimate questions while a lie detector, secretly controlled by their significant others, verifies their answers.
2	2	"Make Some Noise"	Josh Ruben, Zac Oyama, Brennan Lee Mulligan	September 27, 2019
The players are given a series of impressions and improv prompts they must perform. This episode was spun off into the show Make Some Noise.
3	3	"Game of Prizes"	Jess Ross, Lily Du, Raphael Chestang	October 4, 2019
The players must wager points to guess whether several prizes being offered are actually real and potentially win them.
4	4	"Whodunnit"	Josh Ruben, Rekha Shankar, Grant O'Brien	October 11, 2019
When one of the players is "murdered," the other two must interrogate members of the show's crew in order to determine the killer's identity.
5	5	"Nom Nom Nom"	Mike Trapp, Tao Yang, Lily Du	October 18, 2019
To appease a giant mouth, players must feed it the correct food based on the clues provided.

=== Season 2 (2020) ===
No. overall	No. in season	Title	Contestants	Original release date
6	1	"Round 4"	Josh Ruben, Zac Oyama, Brennan Lee Mulligan	February 25, 2020
A sequel to the episode "Make Some Noise", with the same players picking up where the previous game left off.
7	2	"Do I Hear $1?"	Ally Beardsley, Grant O'Brien, Raphael Chestang	March 6, 2020
The players attempt to outbid each other with increasingly low amounts of points to take part in unpleasant experiences and win that amount of money.
8	3	"Sleeper Agents"	Lily Du, Katie Marovitch, Tao Yang	March 27, 2020
The players are given a list of awkward and embarrassing phrases they must say to individuals on the street to potentially "activate" them as sleeper agents.
9	4	"A Sponsored Episode"	Mike Trapp, Rekha Shankar, Grant O'Brien	April 10, 2020
The players must make successful marketing pitches for unusual items.
10	5	"The Everything Factory"	Jess Ross, Jess Clemons, Katie Marovitch	April 24, 2020
The players attempt to fulfill specific orders within a time limit as a series of items come down a conveyor belt.
11	6	"Yes or No"	Ally Beardsley, Brennan Lee Mulligan, Zac Oyama	May 8, 2020
A take on the party game Scissors, with the players repeatedly answering the same question, "yes or no", to determine how the game is being scored. After both Ally and Zac guess correctly, Brennan deduces the statistical improbability of the fact that not one of his answers throughout the game has been correct. In a furious tirade, he reveals the rule of the game: Every answer he gives is treated as incorrect, meaning that the rule is that he cannot win.

=== Season 3 (2020–2021) ===
Season 3 was filmed remotely due to the COVID-19 pandemic.

No. overall	No. in season	Title	Contestants	Original release date
12	1	"Tell Us About Yourself"	Jess Ross, Christine Medrano, Alfred Aquino	September 15, 2020
The players must identify a mystery individual (Tony Hawk) by guessing facts about them.
13	2	"Sell Outs"	Mike Trapp, Grant O'Brien, Rekha Shankar	October 5, 2020
A sequel to the episode "A Sponsored Episode", with the players once again making sales pitches for strange items.
14	3	"ChangerCon"	Carolyn Page, Lily Du, Tao Yang	October 16, 2020
The players must assemble cosplay based on specific prompts using whatever they have at their disposal.
15	4	"Is This Thing On?"	Rekha Shankar, Jess Ross, Raphael Chestang	October 30, 2020
Sam's audio is muted, and the players attempt to read his lips to win prizes.
16	5	"Ham It Up"	Lou Wilson, Grant O'Brien, Christine Medrano	November 13, 2020
The players must act out ridiculous prompts following Sam's direction, opposite actor Giancarlo Esposito.
17	6	"Never Have I Ever"	Lily Du, Mike Trapp, Ryan Creamer, Jess Clemons	November 27, 2020
The players play a game of "never have I ever" and try to guess which of them performed each action in the past. This episode was spun off into the show Dirty Laundry.
18	7	"Jeopardy!"	Brennan Lee Mulligan, Ify Nwadiwe, Ally Beardsley	December 12, 2020
The players play a game of Jeopardy! that is soon revealed to be a pirate-themed roleplaying game.
19	8	"Secret Samta"	Grant O'Brien, Ally Beardsley, Lily Du	December 26, 2020
The players open up a series of gifts, and try to trick each other into stealing the bad ones while keeping the good ones for themselves.
20	9	"20/20 Vision"	Grant O'Brien, Katie Marovitch, Lily Du	January 8, 2021
The players must recall whether certain major events took place in the year 2020.
21	10	"The Substitute"	Josh Ruben, Brennan Lee Mulligan, Michael Winslow	January 22, 2021
The third "Make Some Noise" episode, with actor Michael Winslow now attempting to earn points for the absent Zac.
22	11	"Three For the Price of One"	Mike Trapp, Grant O'Brien, Rekha Shankar	February 20, 2021
The third "A Sponsored Episode" entry, with the players once again attempting to sell whatever is asked of them.
23	12	"Next Slide Please"	Mike Trapp, Rekha Shankar, Ryan Creamer	March 5, 2021
The players must give a presentation based on an accompanying slideshow they haven't seen before.
24	13	"Make It Fashion"	Carolyn Page, Lily Du, Katie Marovitch	March 9, 2021
A sequel to the episode "ChangerCon", with the players attempting to create specific fashion styles with whatever they can find.
25	14	"Tome of Terror"	Katie Marovitch, Jess Ross, Raphael Chestang	April 3, 2021
The players must tell scary stories that incorporate prompts given by Sam.
26	15	"Secret Samta 2: The Samta Clause"	Lily Du, Katie Marovitch, Raphael Chestang	April 16, 2021
A sequel to the episode "Secret Samta", with the players again attempting to manipulate each other into taking unwanted gifts.

=== Season 4 (2021–2022) ===
No. overall	No. in season	Title	Contestants	Original release date
27	1	"Sam Says"	Brennan Lee Mulligan, Isabella Roland, Lou Wilson	November 1, 2021
Players play a game of "Simon Says" that features increasingly tricky prompts.
28	2	"Like My Coffee"	Mike Trapp, Grant O'Brien, Jess Ross	November 15, 2021
The players must come up with punchlines for innuendo-based jokes.
29	3	"Noise Boys"	Josh Ruben, Zac Oyama, Brennan Lee Mulligan	November 20, 2021
The fourth and final "Make Some Noise" episode, in which an overall winner is finally declared.
30	4	"Secret Samta 3"	Raphael Chestang, Tao Yang, Carolyn Page	December 13, 2021
The third "Secret Samta" episode, with the players attempting to claim good presents and get rid of the bad ones.
31	5	"The Official Cast Recording"	Zeke Nicholson, Zach Reino, Jess McKenna	December 27, 2021
The players must improvise a stage musical, "Welcome to Mountport", based on prompts given by Sam and accompaniment by keyboardist Scott Passarella. This was spun off into the show Play It By Ear.
32	6	"Filmed Before a Live Studio Audience"	Becca Scott, Isabella Roland, Erika Ishii	January 10, 2022
The players must determine what actions they are meant to perform based on the sound of an audience reacting.
33	7	"Don't Cry"	Luke Field, Jess Ross, Rekha Shankar	January 24, 2022
The players attempt to avoid crying in response to specific prompts, which is slowly revealed to be a surprise celebration of Jess Ross due to her struggles during the COVID-19 pandemic. Bob the Drag Queen officiates a practice wedding.
34	8	"Race to the Bottom"	Ally Beardsley, Grant O'Brien, Lily Du	February 7, 2022
A sequel to the episode "Do I Hear $1?", with the addition of a scab, Katie Marovitch, to prevent the players from uniting against Sam.
35	9	"Survivor: Part 1"	Ally Beardsley, Brennan Lee Mulligan, Lou Wilson, Erika Ishii, Grant O'Brien, Katie Marovitch, Raphael Chestang	February 21, 2022
Inspired by Survivor, the players are split into two teams and compete to make each other laugh to gain immunity from being eliminated.
36	10	"Survivor: Part 2"	Ally Beardsley, Brennan Lee Mulligan, Lou Wilson, Erika Ishii, Grant O'Brien, Katie Marovitch, Raphael Chestang	March 7, 2022
The two teams are merged, and the remaining players must compete individually to be the last one standing.
37	11	"Game Changer Season 4: Cut For Time"	N/A	April 4, 2022
A compilation of jokes and segments which were edited out of other Season 4 episodes.

=== Season 5 (2022–2023) ===
No. overall	No. in season	Title	Contestants	Original release date
38	1	"Sam Says 2"	Zac Oyama, Jacob Wysocki, Ally Beardsley	November 14, 2022
A sequel to the episode "Sam Says", with the players competing in "Simon Says" using increasingly bizarre prompts.
39	2	"Karaoke Night"	Zach Reino, Ross Bryant, Rashawn Scott	November 28, 2022
The players must improvise songs based on provided titles and musical artists, with help from pianist Aaron Wilson. This episode's format was revisited in season 2 of Make Some Noise.
40	3	"Like My Coffee 2"	Rekha Shankar, Grant O'Brien, Jess Ross	December 12, 2022
A sequel to the episode "Like My Coffee", with the players once again creating responses to innuendo setups.
41	4	"Name a Number"	Becca Scott, Isabella Roland, Erika Ishii	December 26, 2022
The players estimate the number of times they can perform a specific task, and must then do so in order to earn points.
42	5	"A Game Most Changed"	Joey Bland, Ross Bryant, Blaine Swen	January 9, 2023
The players must improvise a Shakespearean play, earning points each time they incorporate specific prompts given by Sam.
43	6	"As a Cucumber"	Katie Marovitch, Brennan Lee Mulligan, Carolyn Page	January 23, 2023
The players must complete a series of prompts and challenges without allowing their heart rate to increase above a certain threshold.
44	7	"The Bachelor: Part 1"	Grant O'Brien	February 6, 2023
Grant O'Brien is placed in a The Bachelor-inspired scenario in which he must choose between ten potential suitors, eliminating them one at a time, with Ally Beardsley and Jess Ross acting as his counsel.
45	8	"The Bachelor: Part 2"	Grant O'Brien	February 20, 2023
With six suitors remaining, Grant must make a final decision as to which suitor to select. Nick Kocher appears as part of Grant's guest council.
46	9	"Escape the Greenroom"	Brennan Lee Mulligan, Siobhan Thompson, Lou Wilson	March 6, 2023
The players are trapped in the green room, which has been converted into an escape room, and must escape before time runs out.
47	10	"Game Changer: Battle Royale Pt. 1"	Ally Beardsley, Tao Yang, Rekha Shankar, Lily Du, Adam Conover, Ify Nwadiwe, Jacob Wysocki, Vic Michaelis, Anna Garcia, Isabella Roland	April 3, 2023
A sequel to last season’s "Survivor" episodes. The players, split into teams, compete for immunity by attempting to wear as many hats as possible for Survivor: Edge of Extinction contestant Rick Devens and searching for cakes made by Is It Cake? artist Andrew Fuller disguised as everyday objects.
48	11	"Game Changer: Battle Royale Pt. 2"	Ally Beardsley, Tao Yang, Rekha Shankar, Lily Du, Adam Conover, Ify Nwadiwe, Jacob Wysocki, Vic Michaelis, Anna Garcia, Isabella Roland	April 17, 2023
The teams merge and the eight remaining players create sandwiches for MasterChef's Claudia Sandoval and attempt to locate an immunity necklace hidden in one of several gift boxes.
49	12	"Game Changer: Battle Royale Pt. 3"	Ally Beardsley, Tao Yang, Rekha Shankar, Lily Du, Adam Conover, Ify Nwadiwe, Jacob Wysocki, Vic Michaelis, Anna Garcia, Isabella Roland	May 1, 2023
The six remaining players attempt to perform the quietest ASMR possible, while the eliminated players compete in a talent show judged by Howie Mandel to rejoin the game.
50	13	"Game Changer: Battle Royale Pt. 4"	Ally Beardsley, Tao Yang, Rekha Shankar, Lily Du, Adam Conover, Ify Nwadiwe, Jacob Wysocki, Vic Michaelis, Anna Garcia, Isabella Roland	May 15, 2023
The remaining players receive "videos From home" before creating erotic pottery for Laganja Estranja and attempting to charm Sam's mother to become a finalist before the jury of eliminated players vote for a winner.
51	14	"Game Changer Season 5: Cut For Time"	N/A	May 29, 2023
A compilation of jokes and segments which were edited out of other Season 5 episodes.

=== Season 6 (2024) ===
No. overall	No. in season	Title	Contestants	Original release date
52	1	"Second Place"	Ally Beardsley, Brennan Lee Mulligan, Oscar Montoya	February 12, 2024
The players compete in several different challenges, but only the player who comes in second place receives points.
53	2	"The Newlyweb Game"	Ify Nwadiwe and Emily Louise; Tao Yang and Alexis Rhiannon; Raphael Chestang and Haley Herkert	February 26, 2024
In a parody of The Newlywed Game, three couples must answer questions about information obtained from their partners' cell phones.
54	3	"Sam Says 3"	Vic Michaelis, Jacob Wysocki, Lou Wilson	March 11, 2024
The third "Sam Says" episode, in which the players must also contend with the addition of ongoing prompts such as a swear jar. Muppeteer Victor Yerrid operates a puppet version of Sam.
55	4	"Pencils Down"	Caldwell Tanner, Kiana Mai, Nathan Yaffe	March 25, 2024
The players must create different art within a three-minute time limit based on prompts provided by Sam and other guests, such as drawings, sculptures, and temporary tattoos. Sarah Natochenny appears to judge Pokémon card designs.
56	5	"Bingo"	Katie Marovitch, Brennan Lee Mulligan, Raphael Chestang (main stage); Lily Du, Mike Trapp, Rekha Shankar (green room); Tao Yang, Carolyn Page, Jess Ross (backstage)	April 8, 2024
The players on the main stage play a game of bingo, but must perform prompts to earn each numbered ball. Unbeknownst to them, a second set of players in the green room secretly provide the prompts to make the players on the stage perform actions listed on their own bingo cards, while a third set of players backstage give production assistant Kaylin Mahoney directions to make the green room players perform actions on their own cards.
57	6	"Deja Vu"	Mike Trapp, Ify Nwadiwe, Siobhan Thompson	April 22, 2024
The players earn points by answering questions and competing in minigames, but the show continually loops back to the beginning, and the players must adapt based on what they learn during each loop. Zac Oyama, Josh Ruben, Brian David Gilbert, and SungWon Cho appear in recurring cameos during each loop.
58	7	"Beat the Buzzer"	Rekha Shankar, Becca Scott, Erika Ishii	May 6, 2024
Sam asks the players trivia questions, but when their buzzers malfunction after a single use, they must repeatedly search for working buzzers hidden around the building in order to answer.
59	8	"Ratfish (Part 1)"	Rekha Shankar, Ally Beardsley, Zac Oyama, Grant O'Brien, Brennan Lee Mulligan, Katie Marovitch, Jess Ross	June 3, 2024
In a game inspired by The Circle, the players are isolated in different hotel rooms and create false personas with which to interact with one another over text, with the least successful at identifying the others' true identities being progressively eliminated.
60	9	"Ratfish (Part 2)"	Rekha Shankar, Ally Beardsley, Zac Oyama, Grant O'Brien, Brennan Lee Mulligan, Katie Marovitch, Jess Ross	June 17, 2024
The game continues with the players now aware of the existence of "The Ratfish", an additional player (Eric Wareheim) who can influence the game and grant other players advantages.

=== Season 7 (2025) ===
No. overall	No. in season	Title	Contestants	Original release date
61	1	"One Year Later"	Jacob Wysocki, Vic Michaelis, Lou Wilson	April 7, 2025
The players are graded on how well they each completed a set of 15 challenges, which were given to them by Sam immediately after the events of "Sam Says 3" one year prior. Zach Kornfeld appears in a cameo as part of one challenge.
62	2	"You-lympics"	Brennan Lee Mulligan, Ify Nwadiwe, Katie Marovitch	April 21, 2025
The players complete multiple challenges, earning points if they do better than their previous attempts a week prior. Immediately after, they complete the challenges a third time, with a reward of two points for a new personal best. Demi Adejuyigbe and Jordan Myrick appear as guest commentators.
63	3	"Earnest-est"	Ally Beardsley, Zac Oyama, Lisa Gilroy	May 5, 2025
The players must respond to questions and prompts as sincerely and earnestly as possible while avoiding making jokes during their turns. Paul F. Tompkins cameos as Santa Claus. The song "Kiss From A Rose" by Seal is used in the final round.
64	4	"Crowd Control"	Jeff Arcuri, Gianmarco Soresi, Josh Johnson	May 19, 2025
The players must perform stand-up comedy in front of a live audience, asking specific crowd members questions about themselves. This was spun off into the show Crowd Control.
65	5	"The Drinking Game"	Lily Du, Erika Ishii, Ele Woods, Jiavani, Angela Giarratana, Becca Scott, Persephone Valentine, Isabella Roland	June 2, 2025
The players must work together to complete challenges and win up to $25,000, made more difficult through the addition of alcohol. The "secret sober", who is pretending to be drunk, must sabotage each challenge without being eliminated in the voting round to win any money that the group loses.
66	6	"One and Done"	Zach Reino, Ele Woods, Demi Adejuyigbe	June 16, 2025
The players each select from a menu of possible challenges, earning points if they complete a challenge on the first attempt. Alex Horne provided a video appearance.
67	7	"Rulette"	Oscar Montoya, Anna Garcia, Jeremy Culhane	June 30, 2025
The players take turns spinning a giant wheel, then must follow the rules it assigns to them.
68	8	"Fool's Gold"	Mike Trapp, Rekha Shankar, Jordan Myrick	July 14, 2025
The players participate in a Shark Tank-like show, taking pitches from multiple different guests (including Johnny Stanton) to create the most viral videos, and are scored based on each video's view count one week after the episode's release.
69	9	"Who Wants to Be...?" "Who Wants to Be Jacob Wysocki?"	Kimia Behpoornia, Jeremy Culhane, Jacob Wysocki, Kurt Maloney	July 28, 2025
The players participate in a quiz show based on Who Wants to Be a Millionaire? slowly revealed to be a special celebration of Jacob Wysocki for overcoming his personal struggles the previous year, with questions being specific and hard to answer about his life.
70	10	"Outvoted"	Brennan Lee Mulligan, Aabria Iyengar, Vic Michaelis, Ally Beardsley, Demi Adejuyigbe	August 11, 2025
The players participate in a political debate to be elected "Honorary President of Dropout", with a live audience voting for their preferred candidate. Keith Habersberger and Zach Kornfeld, and Robert Reich appear as themselves.
71	11	"Samalamadingdong"	Sam Reich	August 25, 2025
During what he believes is a Variety interview, Sam is abducted by Brennan Lee Mulligan and placed in a minotaur's labyrinth operated by other Dropout regulars, which he must escape.

=== Season 8 (2026) ===
No. overall	No. in season	Title	Contestants	Original release date
72	1	"Don't Wake Standards & Practices"	Jeremy Culhane, Lou Wilson, Ally Beardsley	May 18, 2026
In an homage to Don't Wake Daddy, players' movement on a life-sized gameboard is determined by how badly their responses to potentially controversial prompts violate standards and practices guidelines, as voted on by three lawyers, one of whom is Devin Stone.
73	2	"Rulette 2"	Josh Ruben, Anna Garcia, Demi Adejuyigbe	June 1, 2026
A sequel to "Rulette", where the players take turns spinning a giant wheel, then must follow the rules it assigns to them until they can remove or swap them. A new addition is the "Golden Rule", which all players, including Sam and referee Paul Refereeno, must obey.
74	3	"Night Shift"	Rekha Shankar, Siobhan Thompson, Lily Du (day shift); Katie Marovitch, Grant O'Brien, Raphael Chestang (night shift)	June 15, 2026
One set of players, the day shift, must whittle down their task count to one, while another set, the night shift, must do the same but without knowing what their current task is. The night shift can deduct time from the day shift in exchange for items and clues by engaging with a shopkeeper (Chris Grace) and the Mysterious Man (Demi Adejuyigbe). One task involves trying not to acknowledge Ron Perlman, who appears as himself.
75	4	"Kangaroo Court"	Brennan Lee Mulligan, Vic Michaelis, Aabria Iyengar	June 29, 2026
After completing a task, players must state their case before a jury of peers, consisting of Dropout regulars Geoff Ross, Tao Yang, Alex Song-Xia, Carolyn Page, Alexis Rhiannon, Rashawn Nadine Scott, and Mike Trapp, and convince them that they had won the task to receive bonus points.
76	5	"Count the Rice"	Zach Reino, Jiavani, Anna Garcia, Demi Adejuyigbe, Catherine McCafferty, Hannah Pilkes, Ify Nwadiwe	July 13, 2026
Each round, players on the main stage try to count different amounts of rice. The closest player is given the opportunity to perform the undisclosed winning condition, and the farthest off is sent backstage, where there is a sequence of seven additional rooms, each with a minigame which must be failed to progress. At the last room, the winning condition is disclosed to the losing player, who must then win their way back to the main stage where they have the opportunity to win the episode. Dropout regulars Jordan Myrick, Jacquis Neal, Grant O'Brien, and Becca Scott appear as hosts of four of the backstage minigames.
77	6	"Noise Some Makes"	Josh Ruben, Jess Ross, Kiana Mai (yellow team); Zac Oyama, Lily Du, Lisa Hanawalt (blue team); Brennan Lee Mulligan, Jordan Myrick, Caldwell Tanner (purple team); Kaylin Mahoney	July 27, 2026
The Noise Boys are discreetly given an improvisational prompt, Make Some Noise style, and must gain points by having their team members guess what the prompts are. The illustrators (Kiana, Lisa, and Caldwell) draw the prompt, PA Kaylin Mahoney works for all three teams describing the picture, the performers (Josh, Zac, and Brennan) improvise the prompt based on the description, then the guessers (Jess, Lily, and Jordan) guess what the prompt could be. The four groups then swap roles intermittently after each round.
78	7	"Earwigs"	Zach Reino, Ross Bryant, Oscar Montoya, Jessica McKenna, Becca Scott, Erika Ishii, Persephone Valentine, Isabella Roland	August 10, 2026
The players are fitted with giant wigs and earpieces and, in a social deduction game, must identify who did not hear each round's instructions, and who are secretly playing additional "metagames". Alex Horne provides commentary throughout the episode.
79	8	"What's the Catch"	Kurt Maloney, Jacob Wysocki, Kimia Behpoornia	August 24, 2026
Players participate in a fish-themed version of Let's Make a Deal, where the prizes they win can come with an unexpected drawback. Throughout, players can receive chances to swap their prizes or drawbacks. Jeremy Culhane appears as the onstage announcer, Josh Ruben appears as the fisherman behind curtain #2 and for one of Kurt's prizes, Jiavani and Vic Michaelis appear for another one of Kurt's prizes, and Grant O'Brien appears for one of Jacob's prizes.
80	9	"I Spy"	Jacquis Neal, Lily Du, Vic Michaelis, Ele Woods, Brian David Gilbert	September 7, 2026
Players play a classic game of "I spy" by looking at a tableau vivant, then guessing an item based on a description of it. Starting in round two, Sam can randomly choose a spy, who he reveals the next correct answer to, to steal other contestant's points by convincing them to guess incorrectly. Starting in round four, Sam can randomly choose an informant, who is aware of any spies. Starting in round five, Sam can choose a leak, who must convince people into guessing the correct answer to gain more points.
81	10	"Last Talent Standing"	Jiavani, Persephone Valentine, Kaylin Mahoney, Ele Woods, Zach Reino, Katie Marovitch, Kimia Behpoornia, Jordan Myrick, Kurt Maloney, Anna Garcia, Caldwell Tanner, Demi Adejuyigbe, Jacquis Neal, Brian David Gilbert, Jessica McKenna, Ify Nwadiwe, Raphael Chestang, Hannah Pilkes, Oscar Montoya, Erika Ishii, Grant O'Brien, Jacob Wysocki, Josh Ruben	September 21, 2026
Judged by a panel consisting of Maria Bamford, Kumail Nanjiani, and Gianmarco Soresi, players must perform talents until one player remains. Players may not repeat any talent they have previously shown, although they may repeat a talent that another player has shown. Players who are eliminated act as a secondary judging panel if the judges' vote is not unanimous.

== Reception ==
Margaret Lyons, for The New York Times, wrote, "if you've watched a lot of arena comedy specials recently, and you want something at the far other end of the spectrum, or if you've had more than one discussion about whether long-form improv could ever be effective on television, watch this". Polygon's Susana Polo called the show "one of the funniest, nicest, cleverest pieces of TV you can put your eyeballs on right now".

Emmanuel Ronquillo of Collider opined that Game Changer is a blend of "all the fun of a game show, all the humor of a comedy show, and all the excitement of live improvisation" where "each new premise and set of rules are satisfyingly executed". He commented that the show pushes "beyond the traditional limitations of a game show" due to the "flexibility" of its design. He also viewed the show's contestants as "some of the most improv savvy, comically talented, and endearingly competitive players you'll see on any contest show". Belen Edwards of Mashable highlighted that "Fool's Gold" in season 7 is an episode which "doubles as the perfect Game Changer marketing campaign" since "Dropout's primary marketing strategy is social media clips" and "the entire episode has been reverse-engineered to market the show".
