= Very Important People (2023 TV series) =

Improvisational talk show on Dropout

- Season 1 poster, featuring Michaelis surrounded by guests (Note: Clockwise from left: Leighanna-Jean Gruthers (Izzy Roland); Denzel (Ify Nwadiwe); Princess Emily (Anna Garcia); Vic's Ex-Step-Grandmother (Lisa Gilroy); Jasper (Oscar Montoya) and Casper (Jiavani))
- Genre: Improvisational comedy; Talk show
- Directed by: Tamar Levine
- Presented by: Vic Michaelis
- Theme music composer: Martin Landström
- Opening theme: "The High Point"
- Country of origin: United States
- Original language: English
- No. of seasons: 3
- No. of episodes: 46

Production
- Executive producers: David Kerns; Sam Reich; Vic Michaelis; Tamar Levine
- Editor: Eve Hinz
- Camera setup: Multi-camera
- Running time: 15–30 minutes
- Production company: Dropout

Original release
- Network: Dropout
- Release: December 15, 2023 – present

Very Important People is an American improvisational comedy talk show that premiered on Dropout on December 15, 2023, hosted by Vic Michaelis as a fictionalized version of themself. (Note: Michaelis uses they/them and she/her pronouns. This article uses they/them for consistency.) A reboot of 2010 CollegeHumor series Hello, My Name Is..., episodes feature comedians who, after being unwittingly transformed via extensive makeup and costuming, have to devise characters from first impressions for an interview with Michaelis' host persona. The show's third season aired December 2025–June 2026.

== Format ==
The opening sequence of each episode features one or two comedians having extensive makeup and prosthetics applied to them by the makeup team, along with accompanying costume pieces to alter their appearance. The comedians are not aware in advance what they are being turned into, and are prevented from seeing themselves before the process is complete. Once preparations are finished, the comedians are allowed to see themselves in the mirror for the first time, and they are given a few minutes to improvise a character based on their new look. Similarly, Michaelis is not given any details of these characters beforehand beyond their name and appearance.

After the opening preparation sequence, the comedians join Michaelis on the main talk show set, where they introduce themselves in character. The episode then proceeds with Michaelis, playing a heightened fictionalized version of themself, interviewing the characters, asking them questions about themselves and the reasons they have been brought on the show. Interviews will frequently be broken up by segments in which props are brought onto the set, prompting the characters to explain how the object relates to them; the interview may also cut away to photos or footage of the characters, which are shot on a green screen after the episode and added in post production. During interviews, Michaelis often alludes to their own fictionalized backstory and personal life, forming a loose narrative arc through the series; frequent mention is made of Michaelis's strained relationship with Bianca (played by Talia Tabin), their adult step-daughter who also works on the show. The final segment of each episode features Michaelis asking the characters a series of rapid-fire questions, concluding each time with "What is the meaning of life?"

== Production ==
Very Important People is a reboot of the 2010 CollegeHumor series Hello, My Name Is..., which featured Pat Cassels interviewing a different guest each episode, all played by Josh Ruben. Michaelis had previously been featured in minor roles on a few prior CollegeHumor productions before appearing as a contestant on Make Some Noise in 2022; their performance on the series led executive producer Sam Reich to cast them as the host for Very Important People.

Michaelis emulates public-access television presenters in their performance, attempting to instill in their host persona a feeling of believing they are destined for larger things and that their presence on the show lends it additional importance. Michaelis and director Tamar Levine sought to incorporate a narrative arc into the series, developing the "host Vic" character through their interactions with the guests. For the second season, the show's reception of a Webby Award was integrated into the narrative, with Michaelis describing the host character's progression as "just them trying to figure out potentially getting some wins in this career sector, while their personal life is really in the toilet. And trying to make it all work at this place that they don’t really want to be, while also still interviewing these characters." While the guests in the first season consisted entirely of comedians who had previously appeared in other Dropout productions, the second season expanded to include other performers from outside of Dropout. Episodes were also extended in length from the first season.

Episodes are released on a fortnightly schedule. After each episode airs, a "Last Looks" behind-the-scenes video is released, featuring Levine and makeup department head Alex Perrone explaining the creative decisions and technical process behind creating each guest's appearance. Due to the heavy use of makeup and prosthetics, performers on Very Important People are paid between $5,000 and $10,000 per episode.

== Episodes ==
Season	Episodes	Originally released	
Season	Episodes	First released	Last released
1	13	December 15, 2023	June 7, 2024
2	17	November 7, 2024	June 19, 2025
3	16	December 4, 2025	July 2, 2026

=== Season 1 (2023–2024) ===
No. overall	No. in season	Title	Guest(s)	Original release date
1	1	"Princess Emily"	Anna Garcia	December 15, 2023
Vic interviews a European pop star attempting to achieve solo stardom in America after the arrest of her bandmates.
2	2	"Denzel"	Ify Nwadiwe	December 29, 2023
Vic interviews an extraterrestrial who claims he has come to repopulate the planet while secretly living in Vic's guest house.
3	3	"Vic's Ex-Step-Grandmother"	Lisa Gilroy	January 12, 2024
Vic interviews their Nana, their grandfather's irritable ex-wife, who is quick to demean them and tell insulting stories about their childhood.
4	4	"Marionette Conqui and Zonton de la Doll"	Kimia Behpoornia and Jacob Wysocki	January 26, 2024
Vic interviews two French porcelain dolls that have come to life, whose search for their original owner has gone viral on social media.
5	5	"Kepl and Dr. Milk"	Josh Ruben	February 9, 2024
Vic interviews an obnoxious ventriloquist who is jealous at the success of his more charismatic puppet.
6	6	"Tommy Shriggly"	Zac Oyama	February 23, 2024
Vic interviews a mental health advocate who turned his life around after being dishonorably discharged for murdering his military platoon.
7	7	"Professor Avery Goodman"	Brian David Gilbert	March 8, 2024
Vic interviews a transhumanist scientist who is running for mayor on a platform of eliminating free will through mind control.
8	8	"Jasper and Casper"	Oscar Montoya and Jiavani	March 22, 2024
Vic interviews a pair of married authors who are promoting their book about "Sex, the British Way", which involves no physical contact.
9	9	"Leighanna-Jean Gruthers"	Isabella Roland	April 5, 2024
Vic interviews a beauty pageant queen from Florida who has been lying about her age to remain eligible for children's competitions.
10	10	"Pig #2"	Ally Beardsley	April 19, 2024
Vic interviews one of the Three Little Pigs, whose mother's death from being trampled by the Big Bad Wolf has driven them to vigilantism.
11	11	"Martha Tops and Lucian Azathoth"	Rashawn Nadine Scott and Ross Bryant	May 3, 2024
Vic interviews a pair of Satanist youth ministers seeking to spread the word of their dark lord to children.
12	12	"Augbert"	Brennan Lee Mulligan	May 17, 2024
Vic interviews a strange man claiming to be "from the woods", who has infiltrated their dreams to warn them about the future.
13	13	"Very Important Bonus Content"	Various	June 7, 2024
A compilation of outtakes and scenes that were cut for time from the first season.

=== Season 2 (2024–2025) ===
No. overall	No. in season	Title	Guest(s)	Original release date
14	1	"Zeke Aaron McKinley"	Anna Garcia	November 7, 2024
Vic interviews a fourth-grader who was transformed by a genie's wish into a creature made of rocks.
15	2	"Hayes Steele"	Jacob Wysocki	November 21, 2024
Vic interviews Dropout's new owner, a former reality show winner who reinvented himself and became a nouveau riche "almost" billionaire.
16	3	"Jukebox"	Chris Redd	December 5, 2024
Vic interviews an intergalactic warrior, who has traveled back in time 2000 years to warn humanity of a coming millennia-long war.
17	4	"Fourth Witch"	Kimia Behpoornia	December 19, 2024
Vic interviews the fourth member of Macbeth's Wayward Sisters, who was ostracized by her family for her love of prop comedy.
18	5	"Barbara and Bill"	John Early and Kate Berlant	January 2, 2025
Vic interviews a married pair of undead former megachurch owners, who are attempting to launch a soup business after a number of scandals.
19	6	"Ta'Tania Jackson"	Danielle Pinnock	January 16, 2025
Vic interviews a dominatrix fairy from Brooklyn, who teaches them how they utilize magic in their profession.
20	7	"Phoenix"	Zac Oyama	January 30, 2025
Vic interviews the spirit of a dead bassist, who uses a series of strange letters to coerce Vic into making him their co-host.
21	8	"David Hoyle Jr."	Paul F. Tompkins	February 13, 2025
Vic interviews a giant nocturnal "midnight louse" attempting to overcome his species' fear of the sun.
22	9	"Steffi Pops"	Corin Wells	February 27, 2025
Vic reunites with their haunted childhood doll, who bears a grudge against them for getting rid of her as a child.
23	10	"Dan Wesley Sharron"	Bobby Moynihan	March 13, 2025
Vic interviews a Chili's delivery driver who has been frozen in ice since 1986, and attempts to help him recover his memories.
24	11	"Skyler DeMarco"	Paul Robalino	March 27, 2025
Vic interviews a computer hacker who won a sweepstakes to be a guest on the show.
25	12	"Jordache"	Echo Kellum	April 10, 2025
Vic interviews an Atlantean prince who came to the surface looking for a partner, working multiple odd jobs in the meanwhile.
26	13	"Claude McCaw"	Alex Song-Xia	April 24, 2025
Vic interviews a giant macaw who is no longer happy working for the company of supervillains they are on the show to promote.
27	14	"Greg and Charlotte Excitement"	Brennan Lee Mulligan and Isabella Roland	May 8, 2025
Vic interviews a pair of formerly married professional wrestlers, who discuss the effects of their recent divorce.
28	15	"Candice"	Nicole Byer	May 22, 2025
Vic interviews a 16-year-old going through a rebellious phase to learn about teen culture.
29	16	"Spencer"	Lisa Gilroy	June 5, 2025
Vic interviews Satan's infant son, who asks Vic to be his new father in exchange for not fulfilling a request to assassinate them.
30	17	"Very Important Bonus Content (Season 2)"	Various	June 19, 2025
A compilation of outtakes and scenes that were cut for time from the second season.

=== Season 3 (2025–2026) ===
No. overall	No. in season	Title	Guest(s)	Original release date
31	1	"Mother Hot Dog"	Rekha Shankar	December 4, 2025
Vic interviews a sentient hot dog woman, who suffers from postpartum depression after giving birth to all of the world's hot dogs.
32	2	"Boris Tarshkokan"	Jeremy Culhane	December 18, 2025
Vic interviews a foreign ambassador from Lafufu, seeking a political marriage with an American at the request of his government.
33	3	"Archimedes and Ollie"	Brennan Lee Mulligan and Jacob Wysocki	January 1, 2026
Vic interviews a pair of giant twin babies from an alternate dimension, one good and one evil, seeking to be adopted.
34	4	"Fanoli"	Angela Giarratana	January 15, 2026
Vic interviews a longtime Las Vegas entertainer attempting a career resurgence, who offers to compose a new Very Important People theme song.
35	5	"Sudzo"	Eugene Cordero	January 29, 2026
Vic interviews a burgeoning superhero, who gained the power to create bubbles after being caught in a freak Tide Pod accident two weeks prior.
36	6	"Zinnia"	Demi Adejuyigbe	February 12, 2026
Vic interviews a humanoid flower, who expresses their regrets in becoming the host of a public-access children's TV show.
37	7	"Oops Lil Fart"	Lisa Gilroy	February 26, 2026
Vic interviews their childhood imaginary friend, who wants Vic to forgive them because they were sent to imaginary jail for having sex with Vic's dad.
38	8	"Lil Huffy"	Frankie Quiñones	March 12, 2026
Vic interviews a draconic rapper, who has come on the show to promote his upcoming EP and his newfound virality.
39	9	"Stop"	Caitlin Reilly	March 26, 2026
Vic interviews a performance artist, who has come on the show to promote and show off some pieces from their new exhibit.
40	10	"Paloma"	Laci Mosley	April 9, 2026
Vic interviews a poodle mourning the death of her wealthy owner, who is revealed to have murdered him to inherit his money.
41	11	"Dash Highland"	Zac Oyama	April 23, 2026
Vic interviews a troll from a magic forest, who has come to California with his brothers to crowdfund a biopic about their life.
42	12	"Linda Elizabeth Marie Braintree"	Katya	May 7, 2026
Vic interviews an alien cosmetologist, whose beauty products are designed specifically to kill humans.
43	13	"Diamond"	Rachel Pegram	May 21, 2026
Vic interviews a werewolf TikTok influencer and motivational speaker, who challenges their poor treatment of their crew.
44	14	"Jane"	Chelsea Peretti	June 4, 2026
Vic interviews an alien erotic author, who has come on the show as part of their book tour for their newest book.
45	15	"J.W. Smokes"	Anna Garcia	June 18, 2026
Vic interviews the cowboy-like mayor of Wickmore, California, who has come on the show to foster his town's tourism.
46	16	"Very Important Bonus Content (Season 3)"	Various	July 2, 2026
A compilation of outtakes and scenes that were cut for time from the third season.

== Reception ==
Natalie Allton of The Observer praised the show, claiming "You'd be hard-pressed to find a show so delightful throughout, from concept to cast to creation to product." Benjamin Lassy of The Daily Campus gave the second season premiere a 4.1/5 rating, commenting that it "keeps the magic alive from the first season." Polygon ranked Very Important People 45th on their list of the 50 best shows of 2024.

=== Accolades ===
Year	Award	Category	Result	Ref.
2024	Webby Awards	Comedy, Video	People's Voice Winner	
2025	Webby Awards	Comedy, General Video & Film (Video & Film)	People's Voice Winner	
2026	The Queerties	Digital series	Nominated	

== See also ==
- Thank God You're Here - An Australian show, in which comedians are dressed in character and tasked to improvise their way through a scene.
