= Angela Giarratana =

American comedian and actress (born 1993)

- Born: Angela Giovann Giarratana; October 1, 1993 (age 33)
- Education: University of California, Los Angeles (BA)
- Occupations: Actor; Comedian
- Employer: Smosh

Angela Giarratana (born October 1, 1993), is an American comedian and actor. She is best known for her work with the musical theatre company StarKid Productions and the YouTube comedy collective Smosh, of which she has been a cast member since 2022. She is also a co-host of the improv comedy podcast Artists on Artists on Artists on Artists.

== Early life and education ==
Giarratana was born October 1, 1993. Her parents are visual effects artists in the movie industry, with their careers relocating them from New York and Miami to Southern California.

Giarratana became interested in acting at a young age, but did not become involved with theater until middle school. She attended the UCLA school of Theatre, Film, and Television, where she obtained a BA in theatre. There, Giarratana was a member of Company, a tradition for the annual UCLA Spring Sing competition. In 2016, she starred as Gretel alongside Caleb Foote and Bradley Whitford in Hansel & Gretel Bluegrass at the 24th Street Theatre in Los Angeles.

== Career ==
In late 2020, Giarratana performed as part of ABC's Los Angeles Talent Showcase. In late 2022, she appeared in an Alexa commercial for Amazon Prime. Giarratana co-hosts the improv comedy podcast Artists on Artists on Artists on Artists with Kylie Brakeman, Jeremy Culhane, and Patrick McDonald and is a member of the comedy group the Upright Citizens Brigade. Giarratana is a member of SAG-AFTRA.

=== Starkid Productions ===
Giarratana first joined StarKid Productions in 2019, as the character Lex Foster in the musical Black Friday. Fellow actress and member of the company, Jaime Lyn Beatty, recommended her for the role when the original actress became unavailable. She later featured in both seasons of Starkid's online web series Nightmare Time and their short film Workin' Boys in the dual role of Grace Chastity and Hailey.

Giarratana returned to the stage with Starkid in their 2023 musical Nerdy Prudes Must Die as Grace Chastity and again in 2024 as the Stepmother in Cinderella's Castle. On September 14, 2026, it was announced that Giarratana would be reprising her role as Grace Chasity in a 2027 revival of Nerdy Prudes Must Die along with the rest of the original cast at London's West End theatre.

=== Smosh ===
Giarratana was introduced to Smosh through McDonald, who was a head writer at the company. She began working at Smosh as a sketch writer. Giarratana joined the Smosh cast in August 2022. Beginning in 2023, Giarratana appeared on Smosh Games's Sword AF, a Dungeons & Dragons actual play show.

In 2024, Giarratana became the host of Bit City, a Smosh main channel variety series blending sketch and live comedy, where she led segments with both scripted and improvised humor. On the May 10, 2025, episode of the show, Giarratana received a tattoo on camera after losing a game; her chosen design was "tony" in cursive, the name of her cat. Later in 2025, Giarratana was a cast member on Smosh's actual play show We're All Gonna Die, which uses the Dread system.

=== Other work ===
In 2024, Giarratana co-produced the short film guts, in which she also acted. The film, shot in a single day, explores disordered eating, and is partially drawn from Giarratana's own experiences. The film was screened at the Sundance Film Festival that year. Giarratana also featured in the 2026 short film Balloon Animals (directed by Anna Baumgarten), which also screened at Sundance.

Giarratana has appeared on multiple Dropout TV programs, including Make Some Noise, Game Changer, and Very Important People. She has also guested on Comedy Bang! Bang!, Hollywood Handbook, Doughboys, and Good Christian Fun.

== Personal life ==
Giarratana is Italian-American.

== Filmography ==
=== Film ===
Year	Film	Role	Notes	Ref
2024	guts	Amelia	Short film	
2024	Workin' Boys	Hailey/Grace Chasity	Short film	
2025	Dog Moms	Sasha	Short film	
2025	Uncle Johnny	Rose	Short film; also writer and producer	
2026	Balloon Animals	Tara	Short film	

=== Television ===
Year	Series	Role	Notes	Ref
2012	2 Broke Girls	Hipster #2	Episode: "And the Pearl Necklace"	
2016	Murder Among Friends	Nicole	Episode: "Friends in Low Places"	
2021	Call Your Mother	Sarah	Episode: "Save the Date"	
2022	Danger Force	Josie	Episode: "Dude, Where's My Mann Buggy?"	
2022	Minx	Sylvia	Episode: "Relaying News of a Wayward Snake"	
2022	Maggie	Robin	Episode: "You are the Master of Your Own Emotions"	

=== Theatre ===
Year	Show	Role	Theatre	Ref
2014	Crimes of the Heart	Babe	The Treehouse Theater Company	
2016	Hansel & Gretel Bluegrass	Gretel	24th Street Theatre	
2019	Black Friday	Lex Foster	StarKid Productions	
2023	Nerdy Prudes Must Die	Grace Chasity	StarKid Productions	
2024	Cinderella's Castle	The Stepmother	StarKid Productions	
2025	Big Bear	Annabelle	The Elysian Theater	

=== Web series ===
Year	Series	Role	Notes	Ref
2022–present	Smosh	Herself	Main cast	
2023	Dinosaur Portals	Naomi	Episode: "Part II"	
2024	Rhett & Link's Wonderhole	Squirrel Family	Episode: "We Made an Axe Out of Peanut Butter and Cut Down a Tree"	
2024	Dirty Laundry	Herself	Episode: "Whose House Was Raided on Suspicions of Terrorism?"	
2025	The Everything Now Show	Herself	Episode: "Angela Giarratana, Kylie Brakeman, Jeremy Culhane, and Patrick McDonald DROVE Us Crazy (Ride Share)"	
2025	Thousandaires	Herself	Episode: "Loud, Fast, Heavy, Faster, Big Nuts"	
2025	Game Changer	Herself	Episode: "The Drinking Game"	
2025	Gastronauts	Herself	Episode: "A Bone-afide Delight"	
2025-2026	Parlor Room	Herself	2 episodes	
2025-2026	Make Some Noise	Herself	3 episodes	
2026	Very Important People	Fanoli	Also appeared on Very Important People: Last Looks	
2026	Um, Actually	Herself	Episode: "Amanda, Chanse, and Angela Fear They're Losing the Room"	
2026	Smartypants	Herself	Episode: "The Power of Words"	
2026	Last Meals	Herself	Episode: "Angela Giarratana Eats Her Last Meal"	
2024; 2026	Inanimate Insanity	Guava (voice)	Episodes: "Objects in Mirror" and "Rock the Boat"	

== Awards ==
Organization	Year	Category	Work	Result	Ref
Austin Film Festival	2025	Narrative Short	Uncle Johnny	Won (Note: Tied with More Than Dust)	
