= Carl Tart =

American actor, writer and comedian (born 1989)

- Born: January 5, 1989 (age 37); Mississippi, U.S.
- Occupations: Actor; Comedian

Carl Tart (born January 5, 1989) is an American actor, improviser, writer, and comedian. Tart is known for being a featured player on the 2016 Fox sketch show Party Over Here, a writer on the 2016 Mad TV revival, and a regular guest on the podcast Comedy Bang! Bang! He starred on the NBC sitcom Grand Crew. He was hired as a writer for Saturday Night Live at the start of the show's 50th season in 2024.

== Life and career ==
Carl Tart was born in Mississippi and was raised in Los Angeles. He is a regular performer at the LA branch of the Upright Citizens Brigade. He has been part of the LA-based improv group The Big Team, initially known as White Women, since 2013.

Tart has appeared on the podcasts Spontaneanation, Yo, Is This Racist?, Hollywood Handbook, Doughboys, and is a frequent guest on Comedy Bang! Bang!, where his popular characters include O. J. Simpson, lawyer Italiano Jones, Deion Sanders, The Chief from Carmen Sandiego, Charles Barkley, 80s educational rapper MC Sugarbutt, and one-half of the country music duo Memphis Kansas Breeze, opposite Drew Tarver. Memphis Kansas Breeze originated as a sketch on the UCB stage and is written by Nick Ciarelli and Brad Evans.

Tart was a featured player on the Lonely Island-produced sketch show Party Over Here, and he starred for two seasons as Sherm Jones on the NBC primetime sitcom Grand Crew, opposite Echo Kellum and Nicole Byer. He has also guest starred on TV comedies like Superstore, Arrested Development, Brooklyn Nine-Nine, The Good Place, and In the Know, and he played a supporting role in Bill Burr's Netflix movie Old Dads.

He is the co-host of the podcast XOXO, Badabings, with Lamar Woods.

Tart was hired as a writer for Saturday Night Live in 2024, at the start of the show's 50th season.

== Filmography ==
=== As actor ===
Year	Title	Role	Notes
2015	The Soul Man	Marcus	Episode: "No Weddings and Ten Funerals"
2015–2019	Jimmy Kimmel Live!	Gamer Watcher Watcher / Space Pence Crew	2 episodes
2015	Girl Meets World	Restaurant Manager	Episode: "Girl Meets Texas"
2015–2016	Comedy Bang! Bang!	Various	Recurring, 4 episodes
2016	Party Over Here	Featured Player	Series regular, 10 episodes
2016	Tween Fest	Prince Bosh	Episode: "Swag Strike"
2016	Transparent	Guard	Episode: "Elizah"
2016–2019	Bajillion Dollar Propertie$	Eugene "Rocket" Jackson	Recurring, 3 episodes
2016–2018	Lethal Weapon	Station Officer/Uni	Recurring, 3 episodes
2017	Throwing Shade	Sign Spinner	Episode #1.6
2017	Dice	Gordon	Episode: "Big Fan"
2018	Love		Episode: "Stunt Show"
2018	Rob Riggle's Ski Master Academy	Chauncy	Series regular, 8 episodes
2019	Brooklyn Nine-Nine	Max Prescott	Episode: "The Crime Scene"
2019	Arrested Development	Henry	Episode: "Chain Migration"
2019	Cake	Tree (voice)	Episode: "Headspace"
2020	The Good Place	Steve	Episode: "Mondays, Am I Right?"
2020	Superstore	Oscar	Episode: "Sandra's Wedding"
2020	Big City Greens	Dirtbag (voice)	Episode: "Garage Tales/Animal Farm"
2020	Robbie	Karl	Episode: "Robbie vs. Ava vs. Danielle"
2020	Connecting	Wendell	Episode: "Day 90"
2020	Aunty Donna's Big Ol' House of Fun	Hat	Episode: "Party"
2021	Miracle Workers	Lionel	Episode: "Oregon Trail: Hunting Party"
2021–2024	Star Trek: Lower Decks	Lieutenant Kayshon (voice), additional voices	Recurring, 17 episodes
2021–2022	Inside Job	Various voices	Recurring, 2 episodes
2021–2023	Grand Crew	Sherm Jones	Series regular, 20 episodes
2022	Central Park	Herman (voice)	Recurring, 3 episodes
2022	Three Busy Debras	Jasper	Episode: "Debra Gets a Boyfriend"
2022–2023	Smosh	Rev. Pastor J. Priest	2 episodes
2022	Everything's Trash	Hotep Zombie	Episode: "Family Is Trash"
2022	Blockbuster	Jeff	Episode: "Pilot"
2023	History of the World, Part II	Lazarus	Episode: "VII"
2023–2025	Digman!	First Mate O'Dooley / Douglas (voice)	3 episodes
2023	Old Dads	Brian Dodson	
2023–2026	Make Some Noise	Himself	3 episodes
2024	In the Know	Carl (voice)	Series regular, 6 episodes
2024	Thousandaires	James Brown	Episode: "Come on Capes"
2025	Everybody's Live with John Mulaney	Officer Juan Carlos García	Episode: "Is Uber Good?"
2025	Haunted Hotel	Additional voices	Episode: "Ghost Hunters!"
2026	Wonder Man	Earl Reed	Episode: "Doorman"
2026	Strip Law	Mike Milk (voice)	2 episodes
2026	Roommates	AJ	
2026	Kevin	(voice)	Episode: "The Breakup"
2026	Golden Axe	Chronos "Evil" Lait (voice)	Main cast

=== As writer ===
Year	Title	Notes
2016	Mad TV	Season 15
2017–2018	Ghosted	Season 1
2018	Brockmire	Season 2
2019	Brooklyn Nine-Nine	Season 6
2020	Sneakerheads	Season 1
2020	Connecting	Season 1
2021	Kenan	Season 1
2024–present	Saturday Night Live	Season 50–present
