= Anna Garcia =

American comedian and actress (born 1995)

- Born: November 29, 1995 (age 30); Beverly Hills, Michigan, U.S.
- Occupations: Actress, comedian
- Years active: 2017–present
- Website: https://www.itsannagarcia.com/

Anna Garcia (born November 29, 1995) is an American comedian and actress. She has acted in the television series Superstore, Hacks, It's Always Sunny in Philadelphia, Party Down, Very Important People, and The Rookie. Her film debut was in the Greg Berlanti film Fly Me to the Moon.

== Life and career ==
Garcia was born and raised in Beverly Hills, Michigan. She began acting at age six and performed in productions at the Marquis Theater in Northville. She also appeared in commercials. After graduating from Groves High School, she attended the University of Michigan and majored in Screen Arts and Cultures. As a student, she was active in the improv group Midnight Book Club.

She moved to Los Angeles after graduation to pursue acting professionally. With fellow comedian Gabrielle DeCaro, she wrote and starred in the YouTube series The Pembrook Brothers. She eventually booked acting roles on the series It's Always Sunny in Philadelphia, Bunk'd, Superstore, Hacks, and Party Down.

She began to focus on creating TikTok videos during the COVID-19 pandemic and grew her following to approximately 200,000 people. Garcia also appears on several Dropout series, including Game Changer, Very Important People and Make Some Noise. She is one of several Dropout cast members who appear in the The Rookie episode, "Fun and Games", a crossover with Game Changer.

Garcia's feature film debut was Fly Me to the Moon (2024) starring Scarlett Johansson. She portrays Ruby, the last role in the film to be cast after a chemistry read with Johansson.

Garcia is a lead character on season 3 of Roku's Die Hart.

== Filmography ==
=== Television ===
Year	Title	Role	Notes
2017	ComicsVerse Presents: Drunk Comics	Drunk Lady	Episode: “The Origin of Spider-Man“
2018	Wagon Tales	Ainsley Combs	7 episodes
2019	The Pembrook Brothers	Jack Pembrook	8 episodes
2019	It's Always Sunny in Philadelphia	Zoo Employee	Episode: "The Gang Texts"
2020	The Goldbergs	Honeymoon Wife	Episode: “Island Time”
2020	Superstore	K-Fai	Episode: “Customer Safari”
2021	Hacks	Leilani	Episode: "1.69 Million"
2023	Bunk'd	Clementine	Episode: “The Song Remains the Pain”
2023	Party Down	Tully	Episode: "First Annual PI2A Symposium"
2023–present	Game Changer	Herself	6 episodes
2023–2026	Very Important People	Various roles	3 episodes: "Princess Emily", "Zeke Aaron McKinley", "J.W. Smokes"
2024	Die Hart	Pearl	7 episodes
2025	Make Some Noise	Herself	5 episodes
2026	The Rookie	Herself	2 episodes: "Fun and Games", "Survive the Streets"
2026	9-1-1	Faith	1 episode: ”Streets of Fire”

=== Film ===
Year	Title	Role	Notes
2024	Fly Me to the Moon	Ruby Martin	
2026	72 Hours	Trixie	
