= Grand Crew =

American sitcom

- Genre: Sitcom
- Created by: Phil Augusta Jackson
- Starring: Echo Kellum; Nicole Byer; Justin Cunningham; Aaron Jennings; Carl Tart; Grasie Mercedes
- Theme music composer: Nick Lee; Phil Augusta Jackson
- Composer: Nick Lee
- Country of origin: United States
- Original language: English
- No. of seasons: 2
- No. of episodes: 20

Production
- Executive producers: Dan Goor; Phil Augusta Jackson
- Producers: Matthew Nodella; Charla Lauriston; Lamar Woods
- Cinematography: Karsten "Crash" Gopinath; Rick Page
- Editors: Cortney Carrillo; Todd Gerlinger; Deanna Nowell
- Camera setup: Single-camera
- Running time: 22 minutes
- Production companies: P-Jack Industries; Dr. Goor Productions; Universal Television

Original release
- Network: NBC
- Release: December 14, 2021 – April 28, 2023

Grand Crew is an American television sitcom created by Phil Augusta Jackson, that aired from December 14, 2021, to April 28, 2023, on NBC. In May 2022, the series was renewed for a second season, which premiered on March 3, 2023. In June 2023, the series was canceled after two seasons.

== Cast and characters ==
=== Main ===
- Echo Kellum as Noah Coleman, Nicky’s brother, a hopeless romantic that thinks his life is a rom-com
- Nicole Byer as Nicky Coleman, a realtor and Noah's sister
- Justin Cunningham as Wyatt Fields, the married friend
- Aaron Jennings as Anthony Holmes, an accountant, vegan, and Sherm's roommate
- Carl Tart as Sherm Jones, a journeyman and Anthony's roommate
- Grasie Mercedes as Fay, new to the crew and recently divorced, works at the crew's hangout

=== Recurring ===
- Maya Lynne Robinson as Kristen Fields, Wyatt's wife
- Ashleigh Morghan as Simone, Noah's girlfriend who needs to get married or she will be deported
- Colton Dunn as Michael, Wyatt's brother who dates Nicky
- Ashley Blaine Featherson-Jenkins as Talia, Anthony's girlfriend

=== Guest ===
- Garrett Morris as Narrator ("Pilot")
- Alim Kouliev as Oleg ("Wine & Pie")

== Episodes ==
Season	Episodes	Originally released	
Season	Episodes	First released	Last released
1	10	December 14, 2021	March 8, 2022
2	10	March 3, 2023	April 28, 2023

=== Season 1 (2021–22) ===
No. overall	No. in season	Title	Directed by	Written by	Original release date	U.S. viewers (millions)
1	1	"Pilot"	Mo Marable	Phil Augusta Jackson	December 14, 2021	2.35
Noah decides to propose to his girlfriend, but his friends have concerns it is too soon. Noah's sister Nicky goes on a Tinder date and has to figure out his political beliefs after some questionable conversation. Roommates Sherm and Anthony learn about the pitfalls of living together, which involve Netflix, Kombucha, and toilet paper. Wyatt hosts an anniversary party and tries to use it to help his friends.
2	2	"Wine & Serendipity"	Victor Nelli, Jr.	Charla Lauriston	December 14, 2021	1.73
3	3	"Wine & Fire"	Linda Mendoza	Lamar Woods	January 4, 2022	1.68
4	4	"Wine & Therapy"	Cortney Carrillo	Phil Augusta Jackson	January 11, 2022	1.82
5	5	"Wine & Hip Hop"	Melissa Fumero	Aaron Covington	January 18, 2022	1.75
6	6	"Wine & Pie"	Jarrett Lee Conaway	Rekha Shankar	January 25, 2022	1.52
7	7	"Wine & Headlines"	Matthew A. Cherry	Ify Nwadiwe	February 1, 2022	1.43
8	8	"Wine & Wages"	Princess Monique Filmz	Carla Olivia Torres & Tim Chang	February 22, 2022	1.55
9	9	"Wine & Vineyards"	Cortney Carrillo	David Phillips	March 1, 2022	1.47
10	10	"Wine & Art"	Payman Benz	Kindsey L. Young	March 8, 2022	1.45

=== Season 2 (2023) ===
No. overall	No. in season	Title	Directed by	Written by	Original release date	U.S. viewers (millions)
11	1	"Wine & Traffic"	Mo Marable	Charla Lauriston	March 3, 2023	1.13
12	2	"Wine & Labels"	Cortney Carrillo	Aaron Covington	March 10, 2023	1.15
13	3	"Wine & Neighbors"	Melissa Fumero	Rekha Shankar	March 17, 2023	1.19
14	4	"Wine & Ojai"	Courtney M. Franklin	Kindsey L. Young	March 24, 2023	1.15
15	5	"Wine & Children"	Jarrett Lee Conaway	David Phillips	March 31, 2023	1.18
16	6	"Wine & Roasts"	Neema Barnette	Ify Nwadiwe	April 7, 2023	1.16
17	7	"Wine & Honors"	Maureen Bharoocha	Shenovia Large	April 14, 2023	1.05
18	8	"Wine & Bachata"	Princess Monique Filmz	Tim Chang & Omari R. Allen	April 21, 2023	1.20
19	9	"Wine & Journals"	Cortney Carrillo	Carla Olivia Torres	April 28, 2023	1.36
20	10	"Wine & Tastings"	Phil Augusta Jackson	Phil Augusta Jackson	April 28, 2023	1.00

== Production ==
=== Development ===
On January 23, 2020, it was given a pilot order by NBC. The pilot was directed by Mo Marable and written by Phil Augusta Jackson who was expected to executive produce along with Dan Goor. Production companies involved with the series include Universal Television. On January 12, 2021, it was announced that NBC had ordered the series. On May 12, 2022, NBC renewed the series for a second season which premiered on March 3, 2023. On June 9, 2023, NBC canceled the series after two seasons.

=== Casting ===
In March 2020, Deadline reported Justin Cunningham had joined the cast as Wyatt Fields, Echo Kellum joined the cast as Noah Koles, and Carl Tart joined the cast as Sherm Jones, then later Nicole Byer joined the cast as Nicky and Aaron Jennings joined the cast as Anthony Holmes. On August 17, 2021, Grasie Mercedes joined the cast as Fay.

== Broadcast ==
The series premiered on December 14, 2021, at 8 p.m., with two "sneak episodes" before returning on January 4, 2022, in its regular time slot, 8:30 p.m. on Tuesdays. The second season premiered on March 3, 2023, in its new night and time slot, 8:30 p.m. on Fridays. The series finale aired on April 28, 2023.

== Reception ==
=== Critical response ===
The review aggregator website Rotten Tomatoes reported an 80% approval rating with an average rating of 8/10, based on 10 critic reviews. The website's critics consensus reads, "Grand Crew doesn't immediately find its comedic footing, but this cast of friends—especially the effervescent Nicole Byer—are promising company." Metacritic, which uses a weighted average, assigned a score of 63 out of 100 based on 8 critics, indicating "generally favorable reviews".

=== Ratings ===
==== Overall ====
Viewership and ratings per season of Grand Crew
Season	Timeslot (ET)	Episodes	First aired		Last aired		TV season
Season	Timeslot (ET)	Episodes	Date	Viewers (millions)	Date	Viewers (millions)	TV season
1	Tuesday 8:00 p.m. (1); Tuesday 8:30 p.m. (2–10)	10	December 14, 2021	2.35	March 8, 2022	1.45	2021–22
2	Friday 8:30 p.m. (1–8, 10); Friday 8:00 p.m. (9)	10	March 3, 2023	1.13	April 28, 2023	1.00	2022–23

==== Season 1 ====
Viewership and ratings per episode of Grand Crew
No.	Title	Air date	Rating (18–49)	Viewers (millions)
1	"Pilot"	December 14, 2021	0.4	2.35
2	"Wine & Serendipity"	December 14, 2021	0.3	1.73
3	"Wine & Fire"	January 4, 2022	0.3	1.68
4	"Wine & Therapy"	January 11, 2022	0.4	1.82
5	"Wine & Hip Hop"	January 18, 2022	0.3	1.75
6	"Wine & Pie"	January 25, 2022	0.3	1.52
7	"Wine & Headlines"	February 1, 2022	0.3	1.43
8	"Wine & Wages"	February 22, 2022	0.3	1.55
9	"Wine & Vineyards"	March 1, 2022	0.3	1.47
10	"Wine & Art"	March 8, 2022	0.3	1.45

==== Season 2 ====
Viewership and ratings per episode of Grand Crew
No.	Title	Air date	Rating (18–49)	Viewers (millions)
1	"Wine & Traffic"	March 3, 2023	0.2	1.13
2	"Wine & Labels"	March 10, 2023	0.2	1.15
3	"Wine & Neighbors"	March 17, 2023	0.1	1.19
4	"Wine & Ojai"	March 24, 2023	0.1	1.15
5	"Wine & Children"	March 31, 2023	0.2	1.18
6	"Wine & Roasts"	April 7, 2023	0.2	1.16
7	"Wine & Honors"	April 14, 2023	0.2	1.05
8	"Wine & Bachata"	April 21, 2023	0.2	1.20
9	"Wine & Journals"	April 28, 2023	0.2	1.36
10	"Wine & Tastings"	April 28, 2023	0.2	1.00
