= Ryan Creamer =

American comedian and writer (born 1992)

- Born: September 9, 1992 (age 34)
- Education: Fordham University (2014)
- Occupations: Comedian; podcaster
- Notable work: Wholesome Pornhub videos
- Employer: CollegeHumor

Comedy career
- Medium: Internet video
- Subject: Porn subversion
- Website: ryancreamer.com

Ryan Creamer (born September 9, 1992) is an American comedian and writer. He is known for having created two years of non-pornographic videos for Pornhub widely described as wholesome.

== Personal life ==
Ryan Creamer was born on September 9, 1992. He grew up in Maryland as a middle child in a large Irish Catholic family. He graduated from Fordham University, having attended from 2010–2014, and moved to Los Angeles in May 2019.

== Career ==
Inspired by the work of The Lonely Island and CollegeHumor, Creamer first pursued working in comedy while a student at Fordham University, also taking classes with the Upright Citizens Brigade. While at Fordham, Creamer wrote freelance for CollegeHumor; he was hired as a staff writer in 2016, and by 2024, was both a writer for Game Changer and host for Thousandaires. By October 2020, he hosted his own podcast, American Detour.

=== Pornhub ===
In October 2018, Creamer noticed a "work with us" link at the bottom of the pornography site Pornhub. Seeing the potential humor and an opportunity for exposure, he created a performer account, and was soon a verified Pornhub model. For his first video on the site, "I Tuck You in After You Have Cum", Creamer is in "a Mr. Rogers-esque sweater and tie, sweetly throws a sheet and blanket toward the camera before kissing it goodnight". First published on October 12, 2018, by October 30, it had 1670 views and a 100-percent approval rating. The comedian made more subverted spins on pornographic video tropes.

Creamer's videos, described as wholesome in media reports, went viral on social media sites like Twitter and Reddit, from where they received hundreds of thousands of views. Some of his most-popular and well-received videos are "I Hug You and Say I Had a Really Good Time Tonight and Then I Go Home", "I, Your Step Brother, Decline Your Advances But Am Flattered Nonetheless", "I Ride in a Taxi and Don't Have Sex With the Driver", and "POV FOREHEAD KISS COMPILATION". Creamer's videos have occasionally featured actual pornographic film actors in his videos—including Mia Malkova and Ginger Banks—and are inexpensive to produce, require little time, and are intentional in their amateurish aesthetic.

Pornhub noted the popularity of Creamer's videos on their site, and recognized the performer with an early presentation of his Pornhub varsity jacket. By May 2019, Creamer had earned enough through the company's advertising revenue sharing to pay his rent. With his mother as his guest, Creamer presented the award for "Best Male Pornstar" at the 2nd Pornhub Awards. After two years on the site, Creamer announced his retirement from Pornhub on October 12, 2020. His final video was "The Money Shot", where he showed viewers a United States twenty-dollar bill before saying goodbye.
