= Golden Axe (TV series) =

American adult animated television series

- Genre: Fantasy; Black comedy Action comedy
- Created by: Mike McMahan; Joe Chandler
- Based on: Golden Axe by Sega
- Developed by: Mike McMahan
- Showrunner: Joe Chandler
- Starring: Matthew Rhys; Danny Pudi; Lisa Gilroy; Liam McIntyre; Carl Tart
- Composer: Chris Westlake
- Country of origin: United States
- Original language: English
- No. of seasons: 1
- No. of episodes: 10

Production
- Executive producers: Mike McMahan; Joe Chandler; Haruki Satomi; Shuji Utsumi; Toru Nakahara; Neal H. Moritz; Pavun Shetty; Toby Ascher; Chris Prynoski; Shannon Prynoski; Antonio Canobbio; Ben Kalina
- Producer: Nicholas Cofrancesco
- Running time: 21 minutes
- Production companies: Chandyland; Important Science; Sony Pictures; Original Film; Sega Sammy Group; Titmouse, Inc.; CBS Eye Animation Productions

Original release
- Network: Paramount+
- Release: September 16, 2026

Golden Axe is an American animated fantasy action black comedy television series created by Mike McMahan and Joe Chandler that premiered on Paramount+. It is based on the video game series developed and published by Sega. The series features the voices of Matthew Rhys, Danny Pudi, Lisa Gilroy, Liam McIntyre and Carl Tart as the show's main characters.

Plans for an animated series based on the video game franchise were officially confirmed in April 2024, when Comedy Central gave the series a ten episode order. That same day, the main cast was officially confirmed.

The series is produced by CBS Eye Animation Productions, Sony Pictures, Original Film, Sega Sammy Group and Important Science, with Titmouse, Inc. handling the show's animation.

== Premise ==
Golden Axe is based on the 1989 arcade game of the same name. This follows a trio of warriors: Ax Battler, Tyris Flare, and Gilius Thunderhead. The warriors are battling to save Yuria from an evil giant known as Death Adder with the inexperienced and underprepared Hampton Squib by their side.

== Voice cast ==
=== Main ===
- Matthew Rhys as Gilius Thunderhead, a battle dwarf.
- Liam McIntyre as Ax Battler, a barbarian warrior.
- Lisa Gilroy as Tyris Flare, a battle sorceress.
- Danny Pudi as Hampton Squib, an inexperienced first-time adventurer. The character is original to this series.
- Carl Tart as Chronos "Evil" Lait, a humanoid panther.
- SungWon Cho as the narrator.

=== Recurring ===
- Haley Joel Osment as Janzu, a masochist elf who carries around a bag of magic potions that fall out whenever someone kicks him. He is based on the thieves from the video games, specifically the blue ones.
- Eugene Cordero as Bruiser, one of the Bad Brothers. His armor color is gold.
- Eric Bauza as Rooster, one of the Bad Brothers. His armor color is red, similar to the red giants from the video games.
- Stephanie Beatriz as Druda Hildegrade, an upbeat skeleton and one of Hampton's former childhood bullies who used to serve Death Adder before reforming and joining Gilius and Hampton on their quest to defeat Death Adder.

=== Guest ===
- James Adomian as Moggabog, a 1000-year-old troll
- Fred Tatasciore as Damned Hellstrike, one of Death Adder's henchmen who is also revealed to be Chronos' father and creator
- Andy Daly as Dry Andy, a sober villager from Tender Hamlet
- Dee Bradley Baker as Dark Guld
- Kayvan Novak as Linus Squib, Hampton's father
- Amy Sedaris as Midge Squib, Hampton's mother
- Bashir Salahuddin as Thaxton, a famous bard who holds a grudge against Gilius
- Richard Kind as the Executioner
- Chris Diamantopoulos as Alex, a former acquaintace of Gilius' who died out of cowardice in the appropriately-named Cowoods
- Kumail Nanjiani as the Eye of Novira
- Heather Anne Campbell
- Joe Chandler
- Jonathan Braylock
- Toks Olagundoye
- Steph Tolev

== Production ==
=== Development ===
On April 17, 2024, Comedy Central revealed that they had plans to give a 10-episode order animated series inspired by the video game series published by Sega. It is created by Star Trek: Lower Decks creator Mike McMahan with Joe Chandler. McMahan and Chandler would co-write the first episode and serve as executive producers, with Chandler serving as showrunner. Chris Prynoski, Shannon Prynoski, Antonio Canobbio and Ben Kalina serve as the executive producers of the series, while Haruki Satomi, Shuji Utsumi, Toru Nakahara, Neal H. Moritz, Pavun Shetty and Toby Ascher are on board as well. Golden Axe comes from CBS Eye Animation Productions, Sony Pictures and Original Film.

=== Casting ===
Alongside the announcement of the series, it was reported Matthew Rhys, Danny Pudi, Lisa Gilroy, Liam McIntyre and Carl Tart had been cast as the main characters.

=== Animation ===
The show's animation is being handled by the animation studio Titmouse, Inc.

== Episodes ==
No.	Title	Directed by	Written by	Original release date
1	"The Legend of the Emerald Blade"	Lexy Naut	Mike McMahan & Joe Chandler	September 16, 2026
2	"Rideable Beasts"	Matthew Bordenave	Joe Chandler	September 16, 2026
3	"Tender Hamlet"	Kiki Manrique	Taylor Cox	September 16, 2026
4	"Fly Like an Eagle"	Lexy Naut	Hunter Covington	September 16, 2026
5	"The Brothers Bad"	Matthew Bordenave	Jonathan Braylock	September 16, 2026
6	"Return to Wenisburg"	Kiki Manrique	Sierra Katow	September 16, 2026
7	"The Cold Bard Truth"	Lexy Naut	Joe Mcadam & Chris Stephens	September 16, 2026
8	"Into the Cowoods"	Matthew Bordenave	Cara McFarlane	September 16, 2026
9	"Because We're Us"	Kiki Manrique	Taylor Cox	September 16, 2026
10	"For Yuria"	Lexy Naut	Joe Chandler	September 16, 2026

== Release ==
Golden Axe was originally set to premiere on Comedy Central. In August 2026, it was reported that the series would instead premiere on Paramount+ on September 16, 2026.
