= Spanish Aquí Presents =

- Education: Upright Citizens Brigade Theatre LA

Comedy career
- Years active: 2018–present
- Medium: Improv comedy
- Members: Raiza Licea; Oscar Montoya; Tony Rodríguez; Carlos Santos
- Website: www.instagram.com/spanishaquipresents/

Spanish Aquí Presents is an American comedy group based in Los Angeles. The group (Raiza Licea, Oscar Montoya, Tony Rodríguez, and Carlos Santos) formed in 2018 and is UCB LA's only all-Latino improv comedy show. Also known as SAP, they hosted a podcast of the same name from 2019–2021 on Earwolf that was nominated for a 2021 iHeartRadio Podcast Award for Best Spanish Language Podcast.

== History ==
Spanish Aquí Presents (SAP) formed in 2018 and comprises four group members: Raiza Licea, Oscar Montoya, Tony Rodríguez, and Carlos Santos. The bilingual comedy group formed at Upright Citizens Brigade Theatre (UCB) LA and they are the organization's first and only all-Latino mainstage improv comedy team. Licea created SAP out of frustration from bullying she experienced at UCB, including being teased for her use of Spanglish. The team was created as a space to showcase Latino comedians. The name is an homage to the "SAP" button on television remotes that activates Spanish language dubbing.

Their first show was January 11, 2018. The team sold out the first show and several subsequent performances. In addition to improv, the shows reflect other elements of Latino culture with the inclusion of a live DJ and a food truck. SAP hosts a monthly show at UCB.

== Podcast ==
The group hosted a podcast of the same name on Earwolf from 2019–2021. The podcast discussions were held primarily in English with some Spanish, and include politics, sex, and working in the entertainment industry. Each episode usually featured a guest and a short improvised sketch at the end. The SAP podcast was recognized by Reader's Digest, PopSugar, Vulture, and ¡Hola!. Spanish Aquí Presents was nominated for the 2021 iHeartRadio Podcast Award for Best Spanish Language Podcast.
