= Jeremy Culhane =

American comedian and actor (born 1992)

- Born: February 17, 1992 (age 34)
- Occupations: Comedian, actor
- Years active: 2014–present

Jeremy Culhane (born February 17, 1992) is an American comedian and actor. He became a featured player on Saturday Night Live for its 51st season in 2025. He also appears in shows on Dropout, an online comedy platform. He previously performed with the Upright Citizens Brigade. He is also a co-host of the improv comedy podcast Artists on Artists on Artists on Artists.

== Early life ==
Culhane grew up in Altadena, California. He performed improvisational comedy for four years in high school. He then attended Texas Christian University, where he studied philosophy and economics, became a member of Beta Theta Pi Fraternity, and joined the campus improv group Senseless Acts of Comedy in 2011. In a 2026 interview, Culhane said, "I just wasn't really in [Beta Theta Pi]. I did it for a semester, I quit, and I never paid my dues [...] But it was starting at TCU, and so I joined a starting fraternity, so I'm one of the founding fathers of Beta Theta Pi at TCU". He won the best actor award at the FrogFilm event for student film projects that year and participated in the Student Filmmaker's Association.

== Career ==
In 2018, Culhane appeared in season two of Netflix's American Vandal along with the series Heathers. In 2024, he appeared in three episodes of The Sex Lives of College Girls.

Culhane has performed with the Upright Citizens Brigade, as a member of their Harold team GHOST, house sketch team MOON GOON. He has made numerous appearances on Dropout, an online comedy platform. He was also part of the LA based sketch comedy group Safety Patrol.

Since 2021, he has co-hosted the podcast Artists on Artists on Artists on Artists alongside comedians Kylie Brakeman, Angela Giarratana, and Patrick McDonald. In 2026, the podcast became part of iHeartMedia and the Big Money Players network.

In 2023, he co-wrote and starred in the short film Sperm Bank, based on his friend's real life experiences dealing with cancer diagnosis, which had its world premiere at Tribeca Film Festival.

On September 2, 2025, Culhane was announced as a new cast member for Saturday Night Live's 51st season. During his time on the show, he has originated characters such as Mr. On Blast as well as impersonating public figures such as Tucker Carlson and Elon Musk.

Culhane voiced a DOT robot in Star Trek: Starfleet Academy (2026).

== Television ==
Year	Title	Role	Notes
2017	The Real O'Neals	College Kid	Episode: "The Real Heartbreak"
2017	Jimmy Kimmel Live!	Younger Man	TV Parody Ad
2018	American Vandal	Grayson Wentz	5 episodes
2018	Heathers	Dylen Lutz	10 episodes
2020	9-1-1	Gary	Episode: "Fools"
2022	The Funeral Roast	Alien from Planet Sui	Smosh series; episode: "Olivia Sui Is Dead"
2023–present	Make Some Noise	Himself	Contestant, 5 episodes
2024–present	Game Changer	Himself	5 episodes
2024	Dirty Laundry	Himself	Episode: "Who Almost Went to Jail Because of a Forgetful Woman?"
2024	The Sex Lives of College Girls	Lars	3 episodes
2025	Smartypants	Himself	3 episodes
2025–present	Saturday Night Live	Himself/Various	Featured player
2025	Gastronauts	Himself	Judge, episode: "Now That's a Good Chef, Yum!"
2025	Very Important People	Boris Tarshkokan	Episode: "Boris Tarshkokan"
2026	Star Trek: Starfleet Academy	DOT robot	Episodes: "Kids These Days", "Beta Test"
2026	MP3	Dane Cartel	Main cast
2026	The Fall and Rise of Reggie Dinkins	Max	Episode: "We Keep the Kisses"
