= Oscar Montoya =

American actor

Oscar Montoya is a Colombian-American actor and comedian. He is best known for his work on Dropout productions such as Dimension 20, as a member of the improv troupe Spanish Aquí Presents, and as a main cast member on Minx (2022–2023).

== Life and career ==
Montoya was born in Colombia and raised in Palmira until he moved to New York at age 12. His interest in performing arts developed through training in hip-hop and other styles of dance.

Montoya's breakout role was the character of Richie on the comedy series Minx, which ran for two seasons. In 2023 he won the Supporting Actor TV Award at the Celebration of Latino Cinema and Television for his performance.

He is a founding member of the improv troupe Spanish Aquí Presents. He is also a cast member for Dropout productions, and has appeared in programs including Game Changer, Dimension 20, and Very Important People. Oscar Montoya is also a cast member of the Actual Play series Tales Unrolled.

== Personal life ==
Montoya is queer.
