= Echo Kellum =

American actor and comedian (born 1982)

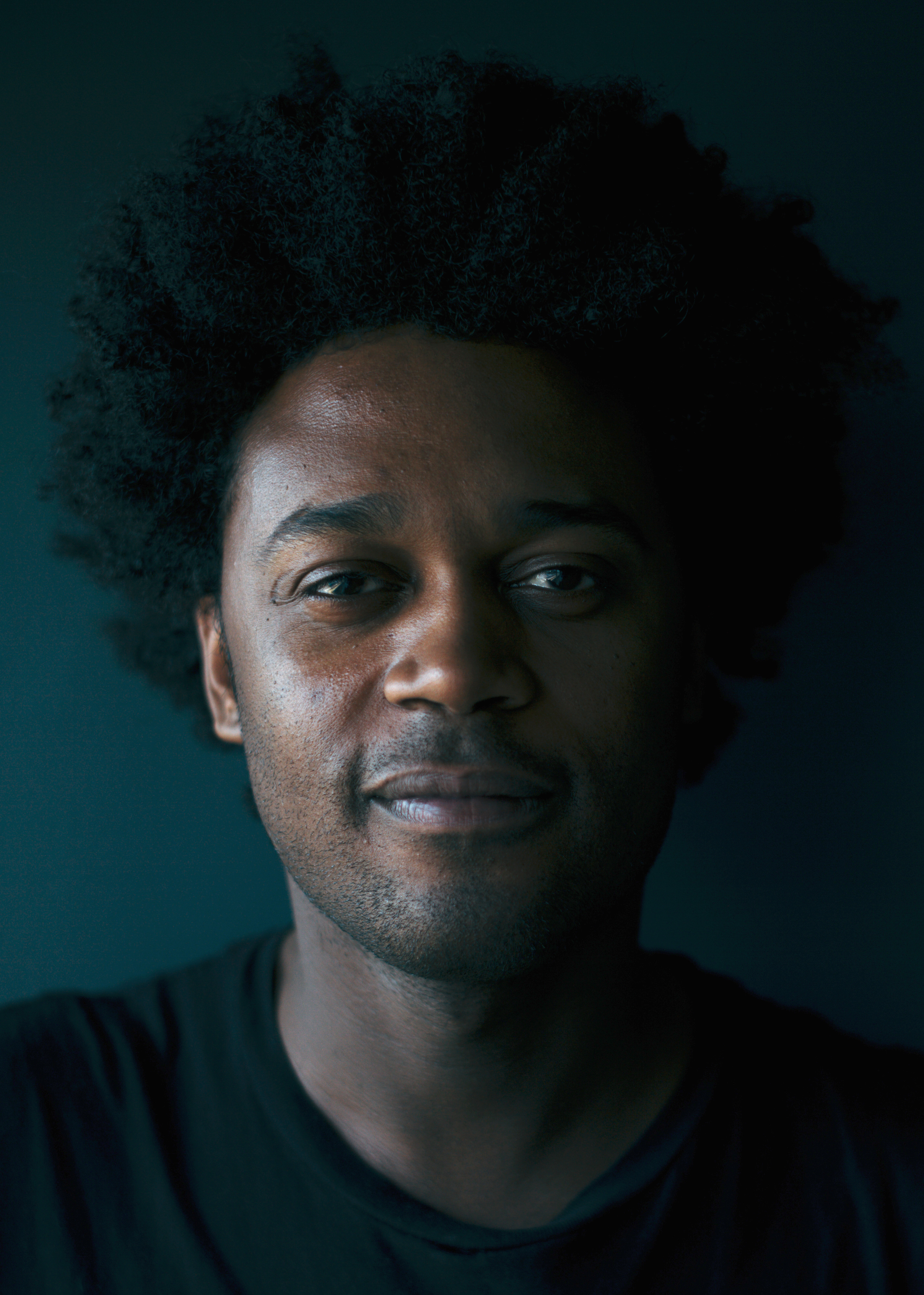
- Kellum in 2017
- Born: August 29, 1982 (age 44); Chicago, Illinois, U.S.
- Occupations: Actor; comedian
- Years active: 2012–present
- Children: 2

Echo Kellum (born August 29, 1982) is an American actor and comedian. Kellum is best known for his roles as Curtis Holt on The CW drama series Arrow, Tommy on the Fox sitcom Ben and Kate, Hunter on the NBC sitcom Sean Saves the World, and Noah Coleman on the NBC sitcom Grand Crew.

== Early life ==
Born in Chicago, Illinois, he moved to Los Angeles in late 2009 to pursue a career in comedy. He is a graduate of The Groundlings, I.O. West, and the Upright Citizens Brigade.

== Career ==
Kellum gained his first major role in 2012 when he was cast in the FOX comedy Ben and Kate (then titled Ben Fox Is My Manny) playing the role of Tommy, the best friend of the titular character Ben (Nat Faxon). Following Ben and Kate, Kellum was cast as Hunter in NBC's Sean Saves the World starring Sean Hayes and Megan Hilty.

In 2015, Kellum was cast in the recurring role of Curtis Holt, based on the DC Comics character Mister Terrific, in the fourth season of The CW drama series Arrow. Holt is a technological savant and inventor who initially works at Palmer Technologies under the supervision of Felicity Smoak, and later becomes a member of Team Arrow. Kellum also went on to portray the character in the Arrow spin-off series Legends of Tomorrow. In April 2016, it was announced that Kellum would be promoted to series regular for the fifth season of Arrow. Kellum exited the series during its seventh season in 2019. He returned for two episodes in Arrow's final season.

In 2017, Kellum appeared in Netflix's Girlfriend's Day as Madsen, beat poet and a co-worker of Bob Odenkirk's character.

Kellum voices the character "King Joaquín" on the Disney Channel animated series Elena of Avalor. He also voices multiple characters for the Adult Swim animated series Rick and Morty.

In 2021, Kellum landed a role on the NBC series Grand Crew.

== Filmography ==
=== Film ===
Year	Title	Role	Notes
2016	Shangri-La Suite	Hepcat	
2017	Girlfriend's Day	Madsen	
2020	Undead Life	Butch	Short
2023	Are You There God? It's Me, Margaret.	Mr. Benedict	
2023	Ruby Gillman, Teenage Kraken	Doug (voice)	
2023	Ex-Husbands	Chris	

=== Television ===
Year	Title	Role	Notes
2012–13	Comedy Bang! Bang!	Concerned Citizen / Tiberius Jones	3 episodes
2012–13	Ben and Kate	Tommy	Main cast, 16 episodes
2012–13	Hot in Cleveland	Aaron / Johnny	Episodes: "Hot & Heavy", "Love Is All Around"
2013	The Gates	Rav Mukherjee	Unsold television pilot
2013	NTSF:SD:SUV::	Clarence / Lex	Episodes: "Inertia", "Unfrozen Agent Man"
2013	Key & Peele	Funk Band Member	Episode: "Tackle & Grapple"
2013–14	Sean Saves the World	Hunter	Main cast, 15 episodes (2 unaired)
2013–21	Rick and Morty	Brad / various voices	7 episodes
2014	American Dad!	Unknown character (voice)	Episode: "Introducing the Naughty Stewardesses"
2014	Two to Go	Nick	Unsold television pilot
2015	Dead People	Doug	Unsold television pilot
2015	A to Z	Joseph	Episodes: "J Is for Jan Vaughan", "K Is for Keep Out"
2015	Drunk History	Lew Alcindor	Episode: "Cleveland"
2015	The League	Mr. McGibblets	Episode: "The Yank Banker"
2015	You’re the Worst	Tall Nathan	4 episodes
2015–16	Pig Goat Banana Cricket	Guitar / Lil' Doctor Dirty (voice)	3 episodes
2015–20	Arrow	Curtis Holt / Mister Terrific	Recurring role (season 4) Series regular (season 5–7) Special guest star (season 8) 72 episodes
2016	The UCB Show	Darbins	Episode: "Feel the Bern"
2016	Time Traveling Bong	Slave	Episode: "Chapter 2: The Middle"
2016	Con Man	Taylor	Episode: "What Goes Up..."
2016–20	Elena of Avalor	King Joaquin (voice)	Recurring role
2017	Legends of Tomorrow	Curtis Holt / Mister Terrific	2 episodes (season 3)
2018	Freedom Fighters: The Ray	Curtis Holt / Mister Terrific (voice)	2 episodes
2019	Liza on Demand	James Dixon Rogers	Episode: "Gentrification: The Musical"
2020	The Fugitive	Coop	Recurring role
2020	Star Trek: Lower Decks	Titan Lieutenant #1 (voice)	Episode: "No Small Parts"
2020–23	Solar Opposites	EDM Trunk / Jesse Guard #1 (voice)	4 episodes
2021	Robot Chicken	Maui, Skeleton Warrior #1 (voice)	Episode: "May Cause the Need for Speed"
2021–23	Grand Crew	Noah Koles	Main role
2022	The Old Man	Mike	Recurring role
2024	After Midnight	Himself	Episode #42
2025	Make Some Noise	Himself	2 Episodes
2025	Very Important People	Jordache	Episode: "Jordache"
2026	President Curtis	Werewolf Syndicate Leader (voice)	Episode: "Ex"

=== Video games ===
Year	Title	Role	Notes
2017	Accounting	Little Public Defender 1, Cop 1	Voice role
2019	Trover Saves the Universe	Bathtub Jim, New Anchor in Studio	Voice role
2020	Battletoads	Pimple, Porkshank, Passerby	Voice role
