= Mike Trapp =

American writer, actor and comedian

- Born: Michael Trapp; October 16, 1986 (age 40)
- Education: Dartmouth College
- Occupations: Writer, comedian, game show host
- Known for: Um, Actually; Game Changer
- Spouse: Laura Cherkas (m. 2013)
- Website: mikewtrapp.com

Michael Trapp (born October 16, 1986) is an American writer, actor and comedian. He is well known for his writing and performing sketches for CollegeHumor and later long-form content for Dropout. He was the creator, writer, and host for the Dropout show Um, Actually, where he worked on until 2023.

== Career ==
Trapp trained in improvisational comedy and sketch comedy at the Upright Citizens Brigade Theater where he later went on to write for its show Stone Cold Fox which premiered in 2012. Later that year, Trapp made his debut on CollegeHumor in the episode "321 Fight: Christmas vs. Hanukkah" as a voice actor, and appeared as himself in 2013 in the episode "Bleep Bloop; The Cologne Wars".

Trapp began working at CollegeHumor on the sales team. Eventually, he began editing and writing for the company and became head writer and VP of Creative. He wrote and acted in many sketches by the company including various webseries like "Jake and Amir", "Hardly Working", and "Dinosaur Office". In 2020 IAC laid off all but seven CollegeHumor staff members with Mike Trapp remaining as a creative without pay.

While Trapp continues to appear on various Dropout shows as a comedian, his full-time job is writing for television shows including Nickelodeon's Rock Paper Scissors and Disney's Big City Greens.

=== Um, Actually ===
Trapp first premiered the concept of Um, Actually in 2015 as a webseries on the CollegeHumor YouTube channel. The show consisted of Trapp providing statements about media that is typically associated with nerd culture with one detail changed. Contestants are asked to correct the mistake beginning with "Um, Actually..." According to Trapp, the premise of the show was to mock exclusionary nerd behavior while also demonstrating love for a topic.

The show got spun off into a Dropout series and became one of the first and longest-running long-form content on the streaming service. It first began streaming in 2018 and was one of the few shows that survived the mass layoff for the company in 2020. Trapp continued to host and was the primary writer for 8 seasons until he stepped down in 2023. In his stead, Ify Nwadiwe took over hosting the show. He has since appeared on the show as a contestant in later seasons.

== Personal life ==
According to Trapp, in his youth he traveled across the United States and South Korea due to his father being in the United States Coast Guard. He met his wife, professional editor, Laura Cherkas during his time at Dartmouth College. They got married in 2013 and later had a child together.

== Filmography ==
Year	Title		Role	Notes	Ref.
Television series
2015	Adam Ruins Everything		Consultant	11 Episodes	
2015-2019	Adam Ruins Everything		Various Roles	4 Episodes	
2024	Rock Paper Scissors		Writer	14 Episodes	
2025	Big City Greens		Writer	10 episodes	
Web series
2011–2020	CollegeHumor Originals		Various	315 Episodes	
2014	The Britishes		Writer	8 Episodes	
2015-2023	Um, Actually		Host	8 Seasons	
2020-Present	Um, Actually		Contestant	3 Episodes	
2016	Bad Internet		Head Writer	10 episodes	
2019	Ultramechatron Team Go!		Himself, Writer	Main Cast	
2019	Troopers		Writer		
2019	WTF 101		Frog, Writer	Voice Role	
2019	Kingpin Katie		Himself	6 Episodes	
2019	Paranoia		Himself	4 Episodes	
2019	Dimension 20	Escape from the Bloodkeep	Sokhbarr	Main cast	
2023	Dimension 20	Mentopolis	Detective Hunch Curio	Main cast	
2019–Present	Game Changer		Himself	11 Episodes	
2024-Present	Smartypants		Himself	2 Episodes	
Theater
2012	Stone Cold Fox		Writer		
Podcasts
2021-2022	High and Mighty		Himself	2 Episodes	
2023	Rotating Heroes		Turbine Spizzlezinc	17 Episodes	

== Awards and nominations ==
Year	Ceremony	Category	Work	Result	Ref.
2016	Streamy Awards	Best Ensemble Cast	Bad Internet	Nominated	
2024	Annie Awards	Outstanding Achievement for Writing in an Animated Television/Broadcast Production	Rock Paper Scissors: "Birthday Police"	Nominated	
