= Alex Song-Xia =

American actor, writer, producer and comedian

- Born: 1992 or 1993 (age 32–33)
- Education: New York University
- Occupations: Writer, actor, producer, comedian
- Years active: 2016–present

Alex Song-Xia is an American actor, writer, producer, and comedian. Their writing credits include Rick and Morty, Exploding Kittens, and The Tonight Show Starring Jimmy Fallon.

== Life and career ==
Song-Xia was interested in performing from a young age, and began to add comedy content to their performances for speech and debate team in high school. They attended NYU for college, and while there trained in improv at Upright Citizens Brigade theatre. From their work on one of the house teams Song-Xia found an agent and was hired as a staff writer for The Tonight Show Starring Jimmy Fallon.

As an actor, their first major role was on The Week Of, which several of their friends were also cast in. They also appeared in the Dropout series Dimension 20: Never Stop Blowing Up, Dimension 20: Mentopolis, and Very Important People.

Song-Xia is a co-host and producer of Asian AF, a variety show starring an Asian American cast at UCB in New York and Los Angeles. They have also written for HBO's Night of Too Many Stars, Rick and Morty, and Exploding Kittens.

Their directorial debut Really Good Driver, which they also wrote and starred in, premiered at 2024 HollyShorts Film Festival. The semi-autobiographical short film also stars Keiko Agena and focuses on a mother teaching her adult child how to drive.

Song-Xia uses they/them pronouns.
