= Ally Beardsley =

American comedian (born 1988)

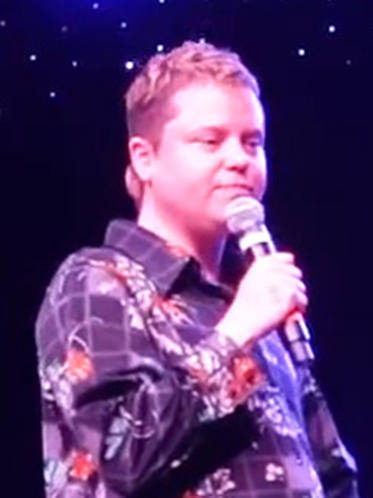
- Beardsley in 2024
- Born: June 25, 1988 (age 38)
- Education: Point Loma Nazarene University
- Occupations: Actor, comedian
- Known for: Dimension 20, Game Changer
- Children: 1

Ally Beardsley (born June 25, 1988) is an American actor and comedian. They are best known for their roles in various Dropout (formerly known as CollegeHumor) productions, such as CollegeHumor Originals, Game Changer, and Total Forgiveness. They are also known for their roles in Dropout's Dungeons & Dragons actual play series Dimension 20, where they have played a variety of LGBTQ+ characters.

== Career ==
Beardsley worked in Amsterdam as part of Boom Chicago for three years before joining CollegeHumor in 2017. They also performed regularly at the Upright Citizens Brigade Theatre in Los Angeles. Beardsley, with Grant O'Brien, created and starred in the web series Total Forgiveness (2019) for CollegeHumor. Jillian Berman of MarketWatch commented that show is "the latest sign that the ubiquity of student debt has pushed it into the cultural zeitgeist" as Beardsley and O'Brien competed in challenges to earn increasing amounts of money towards their loans. Berman opined that neither Beardsley or O'Brien are "the most sympathetic characters to illustrate the challenges of the nation's $1.5 trillion student-loan problem. [...] Nonetheless, the show provides a window into a student-loan experience that's likely relatable for many of the nation's 44 million student-loan borrowers". They also starred in the reboot of Troopers (2019) which premiered on CollegeHumor's new streaming service Dropout. In January 2020, it was announced that IAC was selling CollegeHumor to its Chief Creative Officer, Sam Reich, resulting in the job loss of nearly all employees and staff. The restructured company was reduced to seven people; Brennan Lee Mulligan, Dungeon Master of the anthology actual play series Dimension 20, was the only creative left on the payroll.

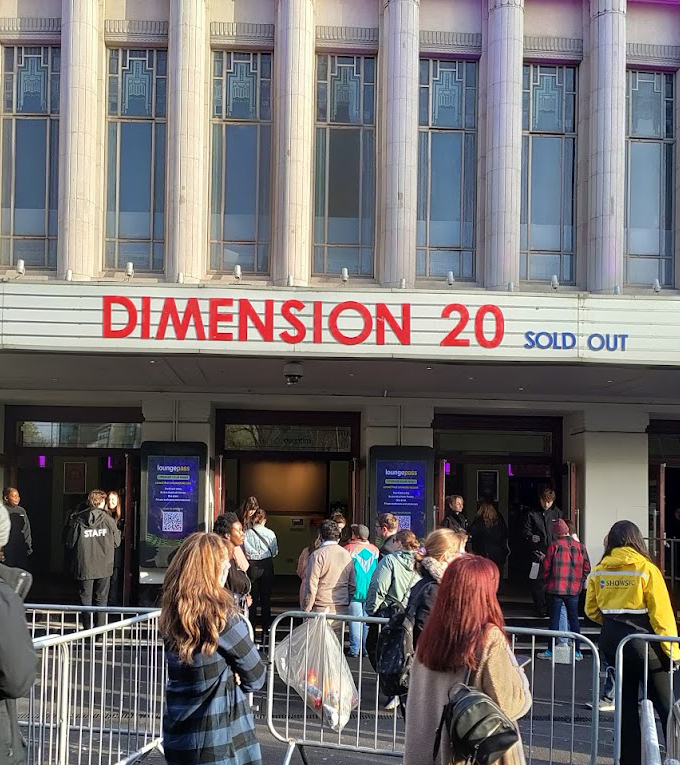
Dimension 20 at the Hammersmith Apollo during the 2024 UK and Ireland tour.

Since 2018, Beardsley has been part of the main cast of Dimension 20; the series survived the "upheaval" at CollegeHumor in 2020. Lauren Coates, for Polygon in 2023, commented that Beardsley is among the Dimension 20 "fan favorites in large part because of their initial inexperience and the new energy they bring to the table". In April 2024, Beardsley was part of the Dimension 20 "Time Quangle" live tour in the UK and Ireland where they reprised randomly drawn characters from previous campaigns. Since 2020, they have also appeared as a guest on various Dropout series such as Game Changer, Very Important People, and Dropout Presents.

From 2018 to 2019, Beardsley hosted Tales from the Closet, a podcast where guests shared stories from before they came out as LGBTQ+. They appeared as a guest on Netflix's The Gay Agenda podcast in 2022. In 2023, they started hosting the podcast Gender Spiral alongside Babette Thomas, where they explore a variety of questions regarding gender and gender presentation.

In 2024, they starred as Glenn in the independent movie The Disruptors by writer and director Adam Frucci.

== Personal life ==
Beardsley first played Dungeons & Dragons on Dimension 20, as their parents had religious objections to the game while they were growing up. Although raised religious, Beardsley has since left their childhood church.

Beardsley is queer and transgender. When they had just started to use gender neutral pronouns, Beardsley created and played a transgender character in their second season of Dimension 20 "who had transitioned in ways" they had not yet. Beardsley highlighted the fun aspect of fantasy where you get to do anything by "stripping away the crunchy, real-world limitations" and felt that character's story arc was "extremely euphoric".

They also have ADHD. They graduated from Point Loma Nazarene University; the student debt they accrued while attending university was the focus of the 2019 show Total Forgiveness. On August 6, 2025, Beardsley announced the birth of their first child.

== Filmography ==
Year	Title		Role	Notes	Ref.
Films
2014	Pim & Pom: The Big Adventure (Dutch: Pim & Pom: Het Grote Avontuur)		Tracey	English voice cast	
2024	The Disruptors		Glenn		
Web series
2016–2020	CollegeHumor Originals		Various	123 Episodes	
2018–present	Dimension 20	Fantasy High	Kristen Applebees	Main cast	
2018–present	Dimension 20	The Unsleeping City	Pete Conlan	Main cast	
2018–present	Dimension 20	Fantasy High: Sophomore Year	Kristen Applebees	Main cast	
2018–present	Dimension 20	A Crown Of Candy	Liam Wilhemina	Main cast	
2018–present	Dimension 20	The Unsleeping City: Chapter II	Pete Conlan	Main cast	
2018–present	Dimension 20	Mice & Murder	Lars Vandenchomp	Main cast	
2018–present	Dimension 20	Shriek Week	Megan Mirror	Main cast	
2018–present	Dimension 20	A Starstruck Odyssey	Margaret Encino	Main cast	
2018–present	Dimension 20	Neverafter	Mother Timothy Goose	Main cast	
2018–present	Dimension 20	Fantasy High: Junior Year	Kristen Applebees	Main cast	
2018–present	Dimension 20	Never Stop Blowing Up	Russell Feeld / Jennifer Drips	Main cast	
2018–present	Dimension 20	Cloudward, Ho!	Olethra MacLeod	Main cast	
2018–present	Dimension 20	Gladlands	Quinn Wedbush	Main cast	
2018–present	Dimension 20	City Council of Darkness	HJ Wingstreet	Main cast	
2019	Total Forgiveness		Themself	Main role; also co-creator	
2019	Troopers		Mara	3 episodes	
2019	Paranoia		Themself	Host; also executive producer	
2019	WTF 101		River	Voice role	
2020	Critical Role	One-shots	AF Flowers	Episode: "Cinderbrush: A Monsterhearts Story"	
2020–present	Game Changer		Themself	18 episodes	
2024	Very Important People		Pig No. 2	Episode: "Pig #2"	
2024	Dropout Presents		Themself	Episode: "From Ally to Zacky"	
2025–present	Make Some Noise		Themself	2 episodes	
