= Ross Bryant =

American comedian

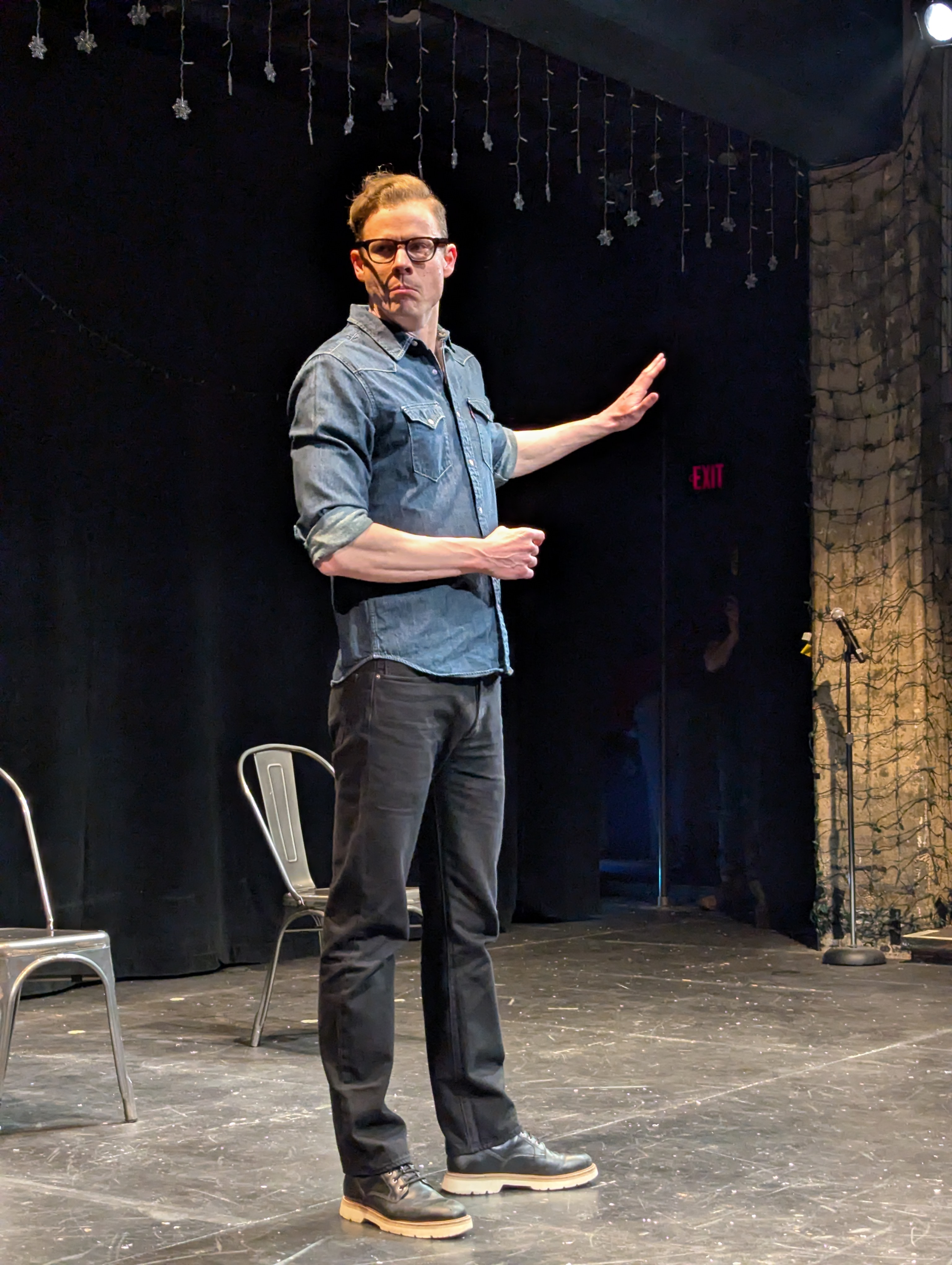
- Bryant in 2025
- Education: Appalachian State University
- Occupations: Writer, actor, cartoonist, and comedian
- Known for: Dropout, Improvised Shakespeare Company, The Glass Cannon Network
- Spouse: Shannon Joy Rodgers
- Website: rossbryant.com

Ross Bryant is an American writer, actor, cartoonist, and comedian. He is best known for his improv comedy performances on Dropout and as an actual play actor for The Glass Cannon Network and others.

== Career ==
Bryant began his comedy career in Chicago, where he trained in improv at the Second City and iO Theater. In 2013 he became an ensemble member of the Second City Mainstage and was referred to as "uber-nerd of prodigious comic distinction" by the Chicago Tribune. He also joined the improv musical comedy team Baby Wants Candy. He also performed in the show Let Them Eat Cake and was a member of the Second City National Touring Company.

Bryant has performed with the Improvised Shakespeare Company, which was founded in 2005 in Chicago, for over 20 years. The troupe performs an original Shakespearean play that is improvised based on audience suggestions.

Bryant acted in Crashing, Adam Ruins Everything, I Think You Should Leave, The Good Place, and Bobcat Goldthwait's Misfits & Monsters. He was a cast member on season 8 of Wild 'n Out. Bryant is a cast member for Dropout and has appeared in series including Make Some Noise and Very Important People.

Bryant is also an actor for actual play web series and live shows produced by The Glass Cannon Network, Ain't Slayed Nobody, Geek & Sundry, and others. In September 2025 Bryant released the podcast Push the Roll with Ross Bryant, produced by Ain't Slayed Nobody and Rusty Quill, on which he is the gamemaster for improvised Call of Cthulu-inspired actual play campaigns. Previous guests include Brennan Lee Mulligan, Ashly Burch, Matthew Lillard, and Colton Dunn.

== Personal life ==
Bryant was raised in Manteo, North Carolina. He received his bachelor's degree from Appalachian State University. He resides in Los Angeles with his wife Shannon Joy Rodgers.

He is a cartoonist and illustrator and uses Instagram to share his work.

== Accolades ==
- 2026 – Winner, Golden Lobes Award for Best International Show (for Push the Roll with Ross Bryant)
