= Ify Nwadiwe =

American actor and comedian

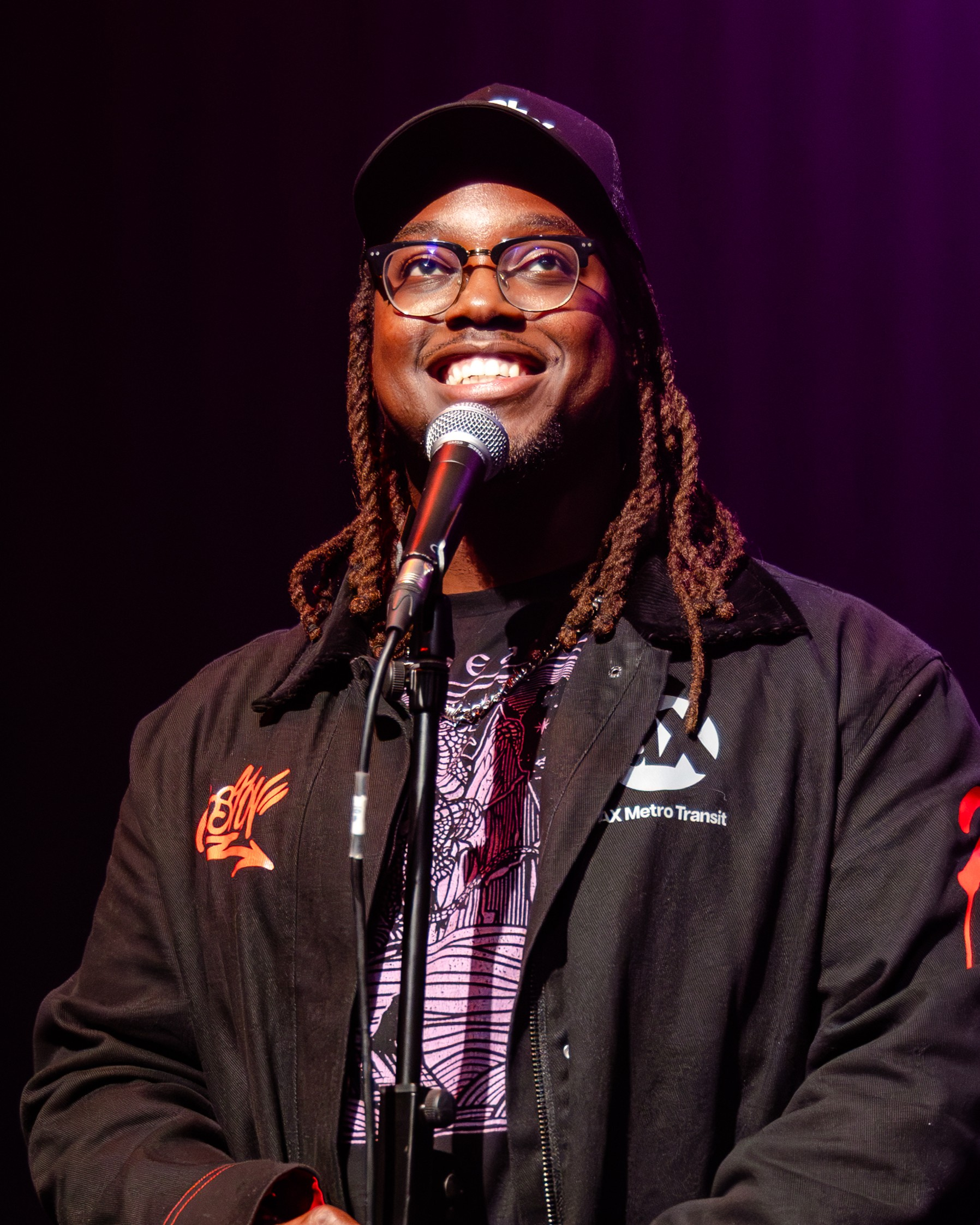
- Nwadiwe at the Edinburgh Festival Fringe in 2026.
- Born: Ifechukwude Nwadiwe; Los Angeles, California, US
- Occupations: Writer; comedian; actor; podcaster; social media personality
- Website: ifycomedy.com

Ifechukwude "Ify" Nwadiwe (/ˈwɑːdiːweɪ/; WAH-dee-way) is an American actor and comedian.

== Career ==
Nwadiwe has written for television shows including Twisted Metal, Tigtone, and Grand Crew.

Nwadiwe is a regular cast member on Dropout shows, appearing in Dimension 20, Game Changer, Make Some Noise, and Very Important People. In 2024, Nwadiwe replaced Mike Trapp as the host of the pop culture game show Um, Actually. He was also an early guest player on Critical Role, appearing as Ulfgar Fireforge in campaign one. He is also a current cast member of live actual play series Acquisitions Incorporated, playing the role of D.A.V.E. (Destroy All Violence Encouraged) having joined at PAX East 2025.

In January 2025, Nwadiwe joined the cast of the off-Broadway production of The Twenty-Sided Tavern.

== Personal life ==
Nwadiwe was born in Los Angeles to Nigerian parents; he is specifically of Igbo descent.

Nwadiwe and his partner Emily Louise appeared together in the Game Changer episode "The Newlyweb Game." Together they host the podcast Our Relationship Pod w/ Emmy and Ify. He is openly polyamorous.

He has one daughter from a previous marriage.
