= Vic Michaelis =

American-Canadian comedian and actor

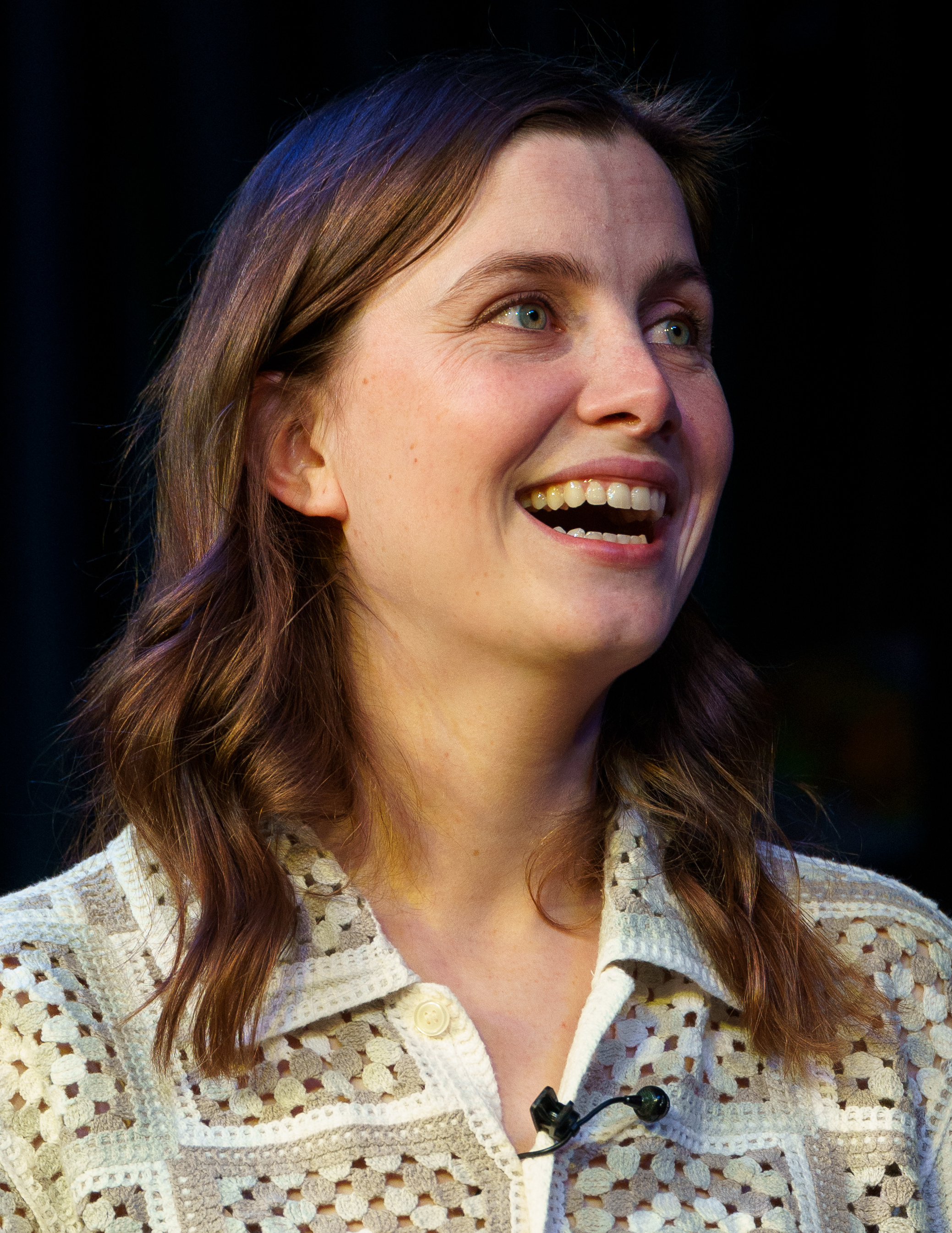
- Michaelis at SXSW 2024
- Born: New Jersey, U.S.
- Occupations: Comedian; actor
- Years active: 2015–present

Vic Michaelis is an American-Canadian improvisational comedian and actor. They (Note: Michaelis uses they/them and she/her pronouns and prefers the use of they/them.) have appeared on Dropout comedy shows including as the host of Very Important People (2023–present).

== Early life ==
Vic Michaelis was born in New Jersey and raised in Illinois before moving to the unincorporated village of Kleinburg in the city of Vaughan, Ontario, Canada, at age 15. They lived with their father growing up and are the oldest of five children, with two full siblings, and two step siblings. Michaelis attended the University of Toronto Scarborough for two years, before leaving to pursue a brief career in fashion and modelling.

== Career ==
=== Television ===
In the 2010s, Michaelis appeared in episodes of Speechless, Bless This Mess, and Motive.

Michaelis played small roles in CollegeHumor sketches while also performing with the Upright Citizens Brigade in Los Angeles. In 2022, they began appearing as a contestant on the Dropout game show Make Some Noise, and later others such as Game Changer, Breaking News, Dirty Laundry, Thousandaires, and Smartypants.

Michaelis played the recurring role of Mildred in the second season of the TV series Upload in 2022. The same year they appeared in an episode of Charmed.

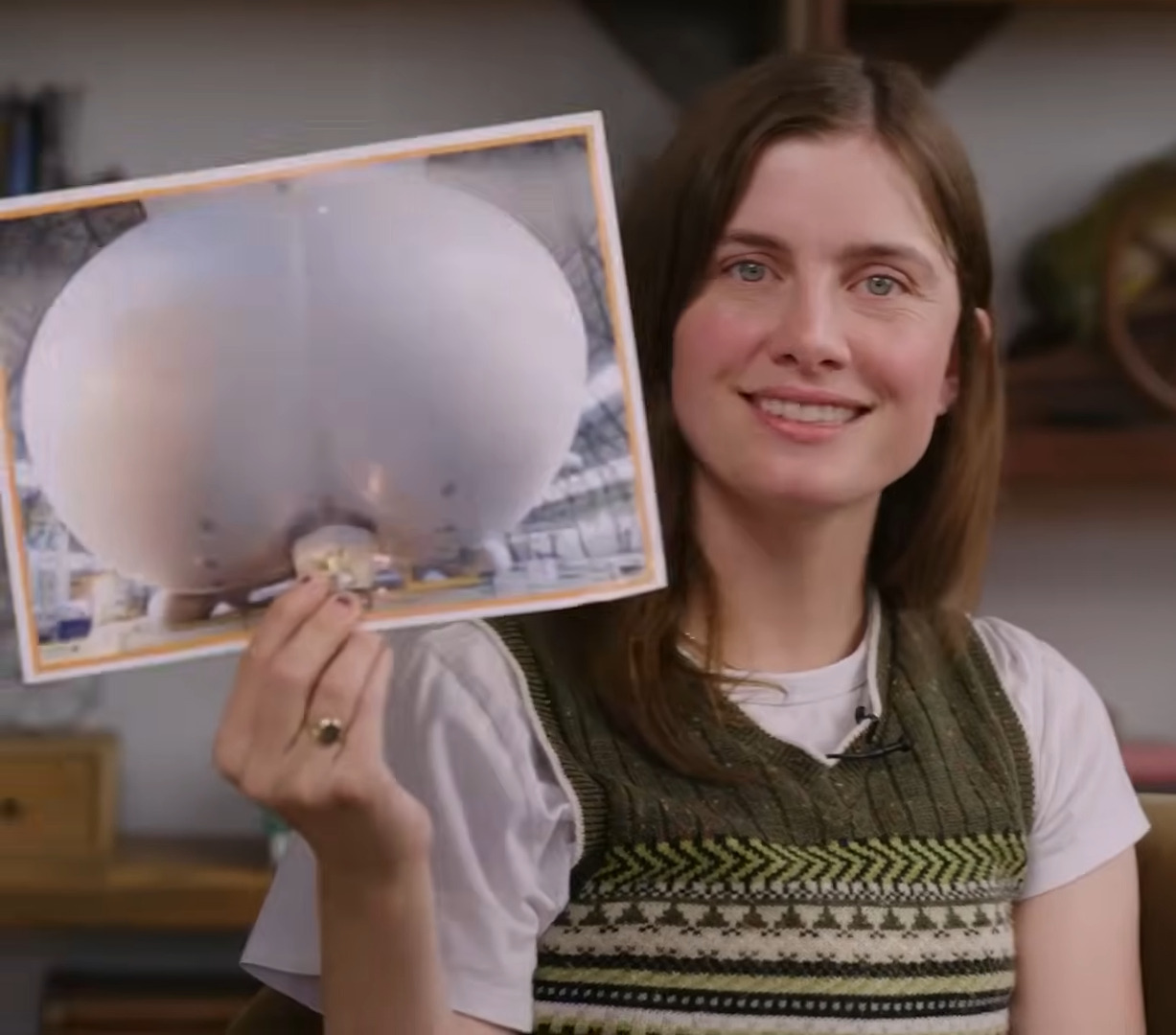
Michaelis on Ask Hank Anything in 2025

In 2023, they became the host of the Dropout show Very Important People, in which they interview comedians playing improvised characters while wearing elaborate costumes. In episode ten of Game Changer's seventh season, Michaelis and Aabria Iyengar were elected as honorary presidents of Dropout.

In 2026, Michaelis appeared in the spy thriller TV series Ponies as Cheryl. They also starred in Dimension 20: Gladlands, the actual play show's 27th campaign, as Hugi.

=== Film ===
Michaelis appeared in the 2021 film Four Walls. In 2023, Michaelis starred in the Hallmark Hannukah time loop film Round and Round as Rachel.

They starred as Violet in the dark comedy film D(e)ad (2026). The film, written by Isabella Roland and directed by Roland's mother, Claudia Lonow, had an independent and crowdfunded production. In reference to Michaelis' work in D(e)ad, Ponies, and Very Important People, BJ Colangelo of /Film called it "a delightful bit of whiplash" to see "Michaelis perform across three different levels of production, value and style between their newest projects, and it is a testament to their talent as a performer".

== Personal life ==
Michaelis is bisexual and non-binary. They use they/them and she/her pronouns but prefers they/them.

Michaelis met their husband, a biologist, when they were both students at the University of Toronto Scarborough while acting in a play he was directing. They were married in 2018.

Michaelis has a second-degree black belt in taekwondo and used to compete when they were a child.

== Filmography ==
=== Film ===
| Year | Title | Role | Ref. |
|---|---|---|---|
| 2021 | Four Walls | Alicia | |
| 2026 | D(e)ad | Violet | |

=== Television ===
| Year | Title | Role | Notes | Ref. |
|---|---|---|---|---|
| 2016 | Motive | Lena Grimes | Episode: "Remains to Be Seen" | |
| 2019 | Speechless | Tour Guide | Episode: "The S-t-a-- Staircase" | |
| 2020 | Bless This Mess | Beth | Episode: "The Table" | |
| 2022–2025 | Upload | Mildred Kannerman | Recurring; season 2, 4 | |
| 2022 | Charmed | Enya | Episode: "Truth or Cares" | |
| 2023 | Round and Round | Rachel | TV movie | |
| 2024 | Murder in a Small Town | Sadie Whitaker | 3 episodes | |
| 2026 | Ponies | Cheryl Szymanski | Main cast | |
| 2026 | The Rookie | Themself | Episode: "Fun and Games" | |
| 2026 | Strip Law | (voice) | Episode: "The People vs. Magicians vs. Animals: Dawn of Justice: Whoever Wins... TA-DA!" | |
| 2026 | Last Week Tonight with John Oliver | Liquor store clerk | Episode: "Secret Service" | |

=== Web series ===
| Year | Title | Role | Notes | Ref. |
|---|---|---|---|---|
| 2022 | Dirty Laundry | Themself | Episode: "Who Committed Libel Against Reese Witherspoon?" | |
| 2022–2024 | Breaking News | Various | 7 episodes | |
| 2022–2025 | Make Some Noise | Themself | 7 episodes | |
| 2023–2026 | Game Changer | Themself | 8 episodes | |
| 2023–present | Very Important People | Host | Season 1–3 | |
| 2024 | Thousandaires | Themself | Episode: "Loud, Fast, Heavy, Faster, Big Nuts" | |
| 2024 | Smartypants | Themself | Episodes: "Birthdays, The Cookout, Vegetables", "Presidents, Zzyzx, Rollercoasters, Night Owls" | |
| 2026 | Dimension 20: Gladlands | Hugi | Main cast; 6 episodes | |

=== Video games ===
| Year | Title | Role | Ref. |
|---|---|---|---|
| 2026 | Star Wars Zero Company | Runa Blask | |
