= Lisa Gilroy =

Canadian actress and comedian (born 1989)

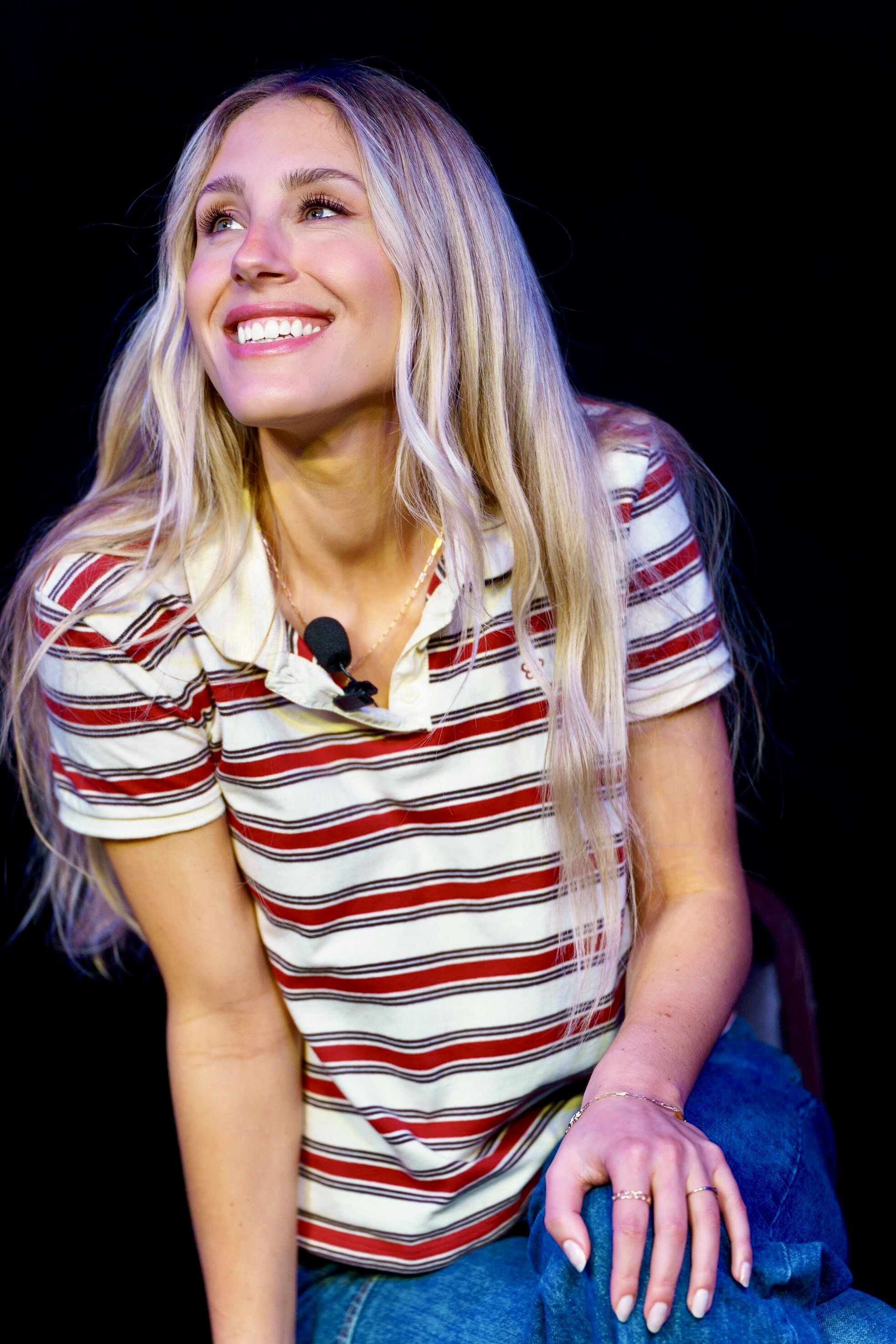
- Gilroy at SXSW, 2025
- Born: 22 October 1989 (age 37); Edmonton, Alberta, Canada
- Education: University of Alberta (BA/BEd)
- Occupations: Actress; comedian
- Years active: 2015–present

Lisa Gilroy (née Lorentz; born 22 October 1989) is a Canadian actress and comedian. She is known for her viral comedic videos, as well as her appearances on the podcast Comedy Bang! Bang! and the streaming service Dropout.

Gilroy's notable roles are Alyssasays in the Netflix series Glamorous, Sarah Green in the Hulu series Interior Chinatown, and Vermin in the Peacock series Twisted Metal.

== Early life ==
Gilroy is originally from the south side of Edmonton, Alberta, where she attended Strathcona High School. Gilroy graduated from the University of Alberta in 2014 with a BA/BEd in drama. She moved to Toronto in 2014, where she hosted YTV's The Zone and appeared on television series such as Undercover High, Air Farce, and The Beaverton. She was also a member of The Second City Toronto's Tour Company and the sketch group The Sketchersons.

== Career ==
After achieving success in Toronto, Gilroy moved to Los Angeles and began performing as part of improv troupes at Upright Citizens Brigade and The Groundlings, where she is part of the Sunday Company. In 2022, Gilroy was named one of Vulture's "Comedians You Should and Will Know" as well as being selected as one of the "New Faces of Comedy" for Just for Laughs Montréal 2022.

She drew significant mainstream attention in 2022 as a result of a series of viral videos on platforms like Twitter, TikTok, and Instagram.

She is a frequent guest on the podcasts Comedy Bang! Bang! and Take Your Shoes Off with Rick Glassman. She has also appeared on the podcasts Bad Friends, TigerBelly, and Whiskey Ginger. Gilroy has also played roles in television shows including Brooklyn Nine-Nine, Let's Be Real, Fairview, Jury Duty, History of the World, Part II, Black Mirror, A Man on the Inside, and multiple Dropout productions, including Make Some Noise, Game Changer, and Very Important People. She appeared in the Netflix series Glamorous and the Hulu series Interior Chinatown and will feature in Comedy Central's upcoming animated series Golden Axe, based on the Sega video game franchise. She guest-starred as Vermin in the second season of the Peacock series Twisted Metal. She appeared in the Apple TV shows The Studio as Gabby and Shrinking as Kimmy.

She hosted the 13th Canadian Screen Awards in March 2025, and in late May, Gilroy appeared as the first-ever guest host of CBS' After Midnight, filling in for Taylor Tomlinson. Gilroy had previously been a panellist on the popular late-night TV show four times before garnering the guest host assignment.

== Filmography ==
=== Film ===
Year	Title	Role	Notes
2026	Office Romance	Tanya	
2026	Super Troopers 3	Bettie	
TBA	You Deserve Each Other	Wendy Duncan	Post-production
TBA	Untitled Stephen Merchant film		Post-production

=== Television ===
Year	Title	Role	Notes
2016	The Amazing Gayl Pile	Cindy	Episode: "The First A-bar"
2016	You Got Trumped: The First 100 Days	Samantha	8 episodes
2016–2017	The Beaverton	Various roles	2 episodes
2017	Note to Self	Angry Pedestrian	Episode: "Human Pillars"
2020	Brooklyn Nine-Nine	Briana	Episode: "Lights Out"
2021	Let's Be Real	Ellen DeGeneres	Episode: "Episode 1.3"
2022	Fairview	Denise, Ashley Osterdorff, Deputy Connie, Cindy (voices)	7 episodes
2023	History of the World, Part II	Romanov daughter / Eva Braun	Episode: "I"
2023–2026	Jury Duty	Genevieve Telford-Warren / Christine Westbrook-Clark	3 episodes
2023	Glamorous	Alyssasays	8 episodes
2024–2026	Very Important People	Nana / Spencer / Oops Lil Fart	3 episodes
2024	Unstable	Donna	2 episodes
2024	Interior Chinatown	Sarah Green	10 episodes
2025	Running Point	Tati	Episode: "Joe Pesci"
2025	Black Mirror	Mom	Episode: "Common People"
2025	The Studio	Gabby	2 episodes
2025	Twisted Metal	Vermin	6 episodes
2025	Solar Opposites	Various voices	2 episodes
2025–2026	The Bad Guys: The Series	Ricki Talon (voice)	6 episodes
2025	A Man on the Inside	Kelseigh Rose Vinick	3 episodes
2026	Shrinking	Kimmy	2 episodes
2026	Scrubs	Lily	2 episodes
2026	Mating Season	Samone (voice)	Episode: "The All-Nighter"
2026	The Paper	Lisa Graysh	6 episodes
2026	Brothers	Gwen Hillcrest Barnes-Davies	4 episodes
2026	Golden Axe	Tyris Flare (voice)	10 episodes
2026	President Curtis	Mika Gladyssmer (voice)	2 episodes
2026	Living the Dream		
TBA	A Hundred Percent †	Jess	Filming
