= Rekha Shankar =

American actress and comedian

- Born: Rekha Lakshmi Shankar; April 3, 1990 (age 36)
- Education: New York University
- Occupations: Actress; comedian; writer
- Years active: 2014–present
- Website: www.rekhashankar.com

Rekha Lakshmi Shankar (born April 3, 1990) is an American actress, comedian, and writer. She is known for her writing and performing work with Dropout (previously CollegeHumor).

== Career ==
Shankar grew up in Philadelphia and graduated from the Tisch School of the Arts of New York University. She initially worked as a video editor before moving into comedy. While in New York, Shankar performed improvisational comedy with the Upright Citizens Brigade Theatre, wrote for the MTV News web series Decoded and the satirical website Reductress, and appeared in web videos for ClickHole and Funny or Die. She was in a sketch group, DUMB video, that made YouTube videos. In 2016, she created the web series Hustle, supported by crowdfunding, which portrayed the life of struggling freelancers as a video game.

Shankar was hired by the comedy company CollegeHumor in 2017. She moved to Los Angeles and became the head writer of its CollegeHumor Originals web series. CollegeHumor rebranded over time into the streaming service Dropout; Shankar has appeared in Dropout series such as the actual play show Dimension 20 and the game show Game Changer. In 2019, she created the Dropout miniseries Gods of Food, a parody of the Netflix food documentary series Chef's Table. She has hosted Dropout shows such as Celebrity Slumber Party in 2018, Erotic Clubhouse in 2020, and starting 2024 she hosts Smartypants, in which performers put on comedy PowerPoint presentations.

Shankar played a small role in Netflix's Between Two Ferns: The Movie, released in 2019, and wrote for the Netflix series Magic for Humans and Astronomy Club: The Sketch Show. She appeared in an episode of the HBO show Hacks in 2021. She later wrote for shows such as NBC's Grand Crew and Comedy Central's Digman!

Shankar voiced a DOT robot in Star Trek: Starfleet Academy (2026).
