= Shannon Gisela =

American actress

- Shannon Gisela at the 2026 conference of the National Association of Hispanic Journalists
- Education: University of Central Florida
- Occupation: Actress
- Years active: 2019–present
- Television: M.I.A.

Shannon Gisela is an American television and voice actress. She has the lead role in Peacock series M.I.A. (2026).

== Career ==
Gisela grew up in Dania Beach, Florida. She attended the University of Central Florida, where she majored in psychology with a specialty in leadership studies, graduating in 2019. Having performed in an improv group at college, she went on to study improv at the Upright Citizens Brigade.

Gisela had roles in the short film Chasers, which premiered at the Sundance Film Festival, and voiced the investigator Irene Gumb in the Netflix animated comedy Strip Law.

Gisela was cast as Etta Tiger Jonze in Bill Dubuque-created crime thriller M.I.A. for Peacock, her first leading role. She describes the character as "whip-smart…[with] a real sense of justice", and related to the character initially "struggling with a sense of purpose" because "in my early 20s, I didn't know what I wanted to major in. I had no idea". The series aired in May 2026.

== Personal life ==
She is of Venezuelan and Irish American descent.

== Partial filmography ==
Year	Title	Role	Notes
2025	Chasers	Elsie	Short film
2026	Strip Law	Irene Gumb	10 episodes
2026	M.I.A.	Etta Tiger Jonze	Lead role
