= Jeremy Crutchley =

South African actor

- Born: 27 July 1961 (age 65); Cape Town, South Africa
- Education: University of Natal
- Occupation: Actor
- Years active: 1980–present
- Website: www.jeremycrutchley.com

Jeremy Crutchley is a South African actor. He played roles in the television series Salem, Black Sails, Leonardo, Constantine and Hannibal and several theatre and cinema works in a career spanning for more than four decades.

He also voiced the narrator of the space opera comedy podcast series Mission to Zyxx (2017-2022).

== Personal life ==
In 1978, he graduated with a B.A.(Hons) degree in drama, from the University of Natal, RSA.

== Career ==
Crutchley has had an extensive theater career spanning several decades. In 1985, he starred as "Alan Strang" in Pieter Toerien’s production of Equus at the Alhambra Theatre. In 1992, he played the role of "Dr. Frank-N-Furter" in South Africa's first production of The Rocky Horror Show. From 1998-1999, he worked with the Orange Tree Theatre Repertory Company in plays such as The Last Thrash and The Way of the World. He also performed as Dr. Drabble in the 2004 West End production of The Dice House. From 2009-2010, he played the role of "Charlotte Von Mahlsdorf" in the stage play I Am My Own Wife, which earned him the Fleur du Cap Theatre Awards for Best Actor and Best Solo Performance. Apart from that, he performed for The Royal Shakespeare Company at Stratford-Upon-Avon in plays such as The Tempest and Sarcophagus.

Crutchley wrote and performed the music and lyrics for the plays Bloodbreath Anaesthetic (1978), Sloper (1983), and A Nightmare on Pretoria Street (1991). In 1984, he composed music, lyrics, and sound effects for the play Brothers of The Head produced by Brian Aldiss. In 2025, he released his first studio album, RELEASE under the name Jeremy Crutchley & The Standing Wave.

In the early 2000's, Crutchley appeared in films such as Red Water, The Poseidon Adventure, Supernova, and Doomsday, as well as the television miniseries Krakatoa: The Last Days and Lost City Raiders. In 2012, Crutchley played the role of "Psycho" in the direct-to-video movie Death Race 3: Inferno, directed by Roel Reiné. He received a nomination for the SAFTA Golden Horn for Best Actor in a Feature Film for his role as Alan Riley in the 2011 film Retribution, directed by Mukunda Michael Dewil.

He has appeared in many television shows and had recurring roles in Black Sails and Salem, among others.

In 2015 he starred as Jimmy Pond in the film Flytrap. For this performance, he received a nomination for Best Actor in Leading Role at Film Fest International, London. In 2017, he was nominated for the Idyllwild International Festival of Cinema Award for Best Actor for the same role. In 2017, he co-wrote and produced the short film Demus. In the film, he also composed and performed the original soundtrack music.

Crutchley is also a voice-over artist that has rendered his voice for film, commercials and animation such as Infinity Train on Cartoon Network.

== Filmography ==
=== Film ===
Year	Title	Role	Notes	Ref.
1980	Macbeth	Extra	TV film	
1982	Safari 3000	French Team		
1983	Hamlet: Prince of Denmark	Gravedigger Two	TV film	
1986	Death of a Teddy Bear		TV film	
1987	The Merchant of Venice	Salerio	TV film	
1988	Journey to the Center of the Earth	Billy Foul		
1991	My Daughter's Keeper	Walter Clarke	Also called Au Pair	
1994	Trigger Fast	Jeb Mallick		
1994	A Good Man in Africa	Dalmire		
1995	Jock: A True Tale of Friendship	Hunter #2		
1995	The Mangler	Pictureman / Mortician		
1997	Pride of Africa	Julian Stodd-Wicks	TV film	
2000	Angels in a Cage	Charl, Script Editor		
2003	Red Water	Shark Expert	TV film	
2004	Forgiveness	Father Dalton		
2005	Supernova	Dr. Joseph Chenislav	TV film	
2005	Lord of War	Arms Fair Salesman		
2005	The Poseidon Adventure	Cyrus Copeland	TV film	
2005	Out on a Limb	Ramsey Harrison		
2006	Ask the Dust	Solomon		
2006	Krakatoa: Volcano of Destruction	Jansen	TV film; Also called Krakatoa: The Last Days	
2006	Opération Rainbow Warrior	Dorman	TV film	
2007	Flood	Bullman		
2008	The Deal	Ian Chadwick		
2008	Doomsday	Richter		
2008	The Scorpion King 2: Rise of a Warrior	Baldo	Direct-to-video film	
2008	Skin	Hugh Johnston		
2008	Lost City Raiders	Father Giacopetti	TV film	
2009	Diamonds	Michael Sloane	TV film	
2010	Spud	"The Glock" Glockenshpeel		
2011	Retribution	Alan Riley		
2013	Death Race: Inferno	"Psycho"	Direct-to-video film	
2013	Spud 2: The Madness Continues	"The Glock" Glockenshpeel		
2015	Flytrap	Jimmy, Co-producer		
2017	Demus	Actor, writer, Producer	Short film	
2020	Saiigo	Co-writer	Short film	

=== Television ===
Year	Title	Role	Notes	Ref.
1991	Trucking	Junior Isaacs		
1993	Tropical Heat	Cecil	Also called Sweating Bullets	
1995	Tales of Mystery and Imagination	Roderick Usher	Episode: "The Fall of the House of Usher"	
1996	Rhodes	Philip "Flippy" Jourdan	TV Miniseries	
2000	Dirty Work	Jeff Woodcock	Episode: "Love Is the Drug"	
2000	City Central	Marcus	Episode: "Death Becomes Her"	
2005	Charlie Jade	Mancuso Keyes	Episode: "Devotion"	
2005	Eine Liebe in Saigon		TV Miniseries	
2005	The Triangle	Balsam	TV Miniseries	
2008	Crusoe	Will Atkins		
2008	The Devil's Whore	Toop	TV Miniseries; Also called The Devil's Mistress	
2011	Kidnap and Ransom	Tom Gallagher	TV Miniseries	
2011	Women in Love	Robert	TV Miniseries	
2011	The Runaway	Hodges	TV Miniseries	
2012	Leonardo	Signor Da Vinci	Episode: "Stupid Cupid"	
2013	Agatha Christie's Marple	Ian Fleming	Episode: "A Caribbean Mystery"	
2014	Black Sails	Morley	Recurring	
2015	Constantine	Stanley Gibson	Episode: "The Saint of Last Resorts: Part 2"	
2015	Hannibal	Dr. Roman Fell	Episode: "Antipasto"	
2015-2017	Salem	Wendell Hathorne	Recurring in season 2, guest in season 3	
2016	Infinity Train	Glad-One (voice)	TV Pilot	
2016	Gotham	Anton	Episode: "Mad City: The Executioner"	
2017	We Bare Bears	Narrator (voice)	Episode: "Planet Bears"	
2017	Blindspot	Leslie Doorhaus	Episode: "Back to the Grind"	
2018	Falling Water	Dr. Stan Ginsburg		
2018	Taken	Senator Buchanan	Episode: "Viceroy"	
2019	The Blacklist	Thelonius Prackett	Episode: "Les Fleurs du Mal (No. 151)"	
2019	Infinity Train	Glad-One / Sad-One / Monster (voice)		
2019	The Tom and Jerry Show	Cates (voice)		
2021	Prodigal Son	Izzy Collins	Episode: "It's All in the Execution"	
2021	American Gods	Maximillian	Episode: "Sister Rising"	
2021	MacGyver	Dr. Silas Mercer	Episode: "C8H7CIO + Nano-Trackers + Resistance + Maldives + Mind Games"	
2021	Infinity Train	Glad-One / One / The Dean (voice)		
2021	Blue Bloods	Kenny Cook		
2021	The Fungies!	Sir Shrimpy / Guard 2 (voice)	Episode: "The Lord and the Layabout"	
2022	Primal	Lord Darlington / Bertie (voice)	Episode: "The Primal Theory"	
2022	Law & Order	Chef Victor Bernini	Episode: "Benefit of the Doubt"	
2023	Summer Camp Island	Frog Guitarist / Theo (voice)	Episode: "Weather Your Weather"	
2023	Unicorn: Warriors Eternal	Merlin (voice)		
2024	Evil	Father Agostino La Russo	Episode: "How To Split an Atom"	

=== Other ===
Year	Film	Role	Genre	Ref.
2014	Game of Thrones: A Telltale Games Series	Denner Frostfinger	Video game	
2015	Star Wars: Uprising	Brother Cyst / Imperial Male / Male Imperial Officer (voice)	Video game	
2016	Star Wars: The Old Republic - Knights of the Eternal Throne	Lord Dramath / Freight Handler / Tragus Rova (voice)	Video game	
2017-2022	Mission to Zyxx	Opening Narration (voice)	Podcast	
