= The Accountant (2016 film) =

2016 film by Gavin O'Connor

- Theatrical release poster
- Directed by: Gavin O'Connor
- Written by: Bill Dubuque
- Produced by: Lynette Howell Taylor; Mark Williams
- Starring: Ben Affleck; Anna Kendrick; J. K. Simmons; Jon Bernthal; Cynthia Addai-Robinson; Jean Smart; Jeffrey Tambor; John Lithgow
- Cinematography: Seamus McGarvey
- Edited by: Richard Pearson
- Music by: Mark Isham
- Production companies: Electric City Entertainment; Zero Gravity Management
- Distributed by: Warner Bros. Pictures
- Release dates: October 10, 2016 (TCL Chinese Theatre); October 14, 2016 (United States)
- Running time: 128 minutes
- Country: United States
- Language: English
- Budget: $44 million
- Box office: $155.2 million

The Accountant is a 2016 American action thriller film written by Bill Dubuque, directed by Gavin O'Connor, and starring Ben Affleck, Anna Kendrick, J. K. Simmons, Jon Bernthal, Cynthia Addai-Robinson, Jean Smart, Jeffrey Tambor, and John Lithgow. The storyline follows Christian Wolff, a certified public accountant with autism who makes his living sanitizing fraudulent financial and accounting records of criminal and terrorist organizations around the world that are experiencing internal embezzlement.

The Accountant premiered in Los Angeles on October 10, 2016, and was theatrically released in the United States by Warner Bros. Pictures on October 14, 2016. Receiving mixed reviews from critics, the film grossed $155.2 million worldwide. It received praise for Affleck's performance and the action sequences featuring the Indonesian martial art Pencak Silat, although its portrayal of autism received a mixed response.

A sequel, The Accountant 2, was released in 2025 by Amazon MGM Studios, with Affleck, Bernthal, Addai-Robinson and Simmons reprising their roles, while a third film is also in development.

== Plot ==
An autistic child whose mother desires to have him treated at the Harbor Neuroscience facility is instead raised by his father, a U.S. Army psychological operations officer who refuses to enroll him. When the mother leaves the family, unable to cope, the father trains him and his brother in martial arts, encouraging the child to acclimate himself to triggering stimuli rather than avoiding them.

As an adult, the child is known by the alias Christian Wolff and acts as a forensic accountant investigating criminal organizations, "un-cooking" their financial records to uncover thefts. He operates a small accounting office in Plainfield, Illinois, that serves as a front for his money laundering enterprise. He assists a farmer and his wife with their tax problems, and is seen living a regimented life in a suburban property. His criminal clients contact him via an unnamed woman (later revealed to be Justine, daughter of Harbor Neuroscience's founder), who also organizes his business, identities and life using a computer-generated voice over the phone. After Living Robotics' CEO, Lamar Blackburn, and his sister Rita learn of accounting irregularities from in-house accountant Dana Cummings, they hire Christian to audit their firm with Dana's assistance.

Christian informs Rita he's discovered $61 million has been embezzled but doesn't know the thief's identity. That night, Living Robotics CFO Ed Chilton is forced by a mercenary hitman to overdose on his insulin. Lamar pays Christian his remaining fee and tells him to leave. Christian kills two hitmen who attempt to kill him. Learning from one that Dana has also been targeted, he prevents another team from killing her in her apartment, then takes her to his storage unit, which contains an Airstream recreational vehicle filled with artwork and valuables he's accumulated by purchase or as payment for previous jobs. He hides Dana at a hotel and goes to confront Rita, finding her murdered. He suspects Lamar is her killer.

Treasury Director Ray King is blackmailing data analyst Marybeth Medina, who omitted her juvenile criminal record from her federal employment application, to get her to find a shadowy figure known as "The Accountant". Medina realizes Christian is using the names of great mathematicians as aliases and tracks the Wolff identity to the accountancy office and adjacent businesses used to launder money. King, Medina, and a group of agents search Christian's home and King tells Medina that Christian was incarcerated following a violent altercation at his mother's funeral which resulted in his father's death. In prison, Christian formed a bond with Francis Silverberg, a former accountant turned informant, linked to the Gambino mafia family.

King, who was working Silverberg's case, is skeptical of Silverberg's claims. King had facilitated Silverberg's release, inadvertently leaving him vulnerable, and was consumed by guilt when the Gambino family murdered Silverberg, torturing him to death. King sought to make amends by surveilling the Gambino family, and thus witnessed Christian eliminating the entire Gambino family in revenge. Christian overpowered King and spared his life after King expressed remorse for his role in Silverberg's demise and shared his pride in being a good father. Following this encounter, Christian vanished but continued to provide King with tips into various criminal activities, allowing him to have a successful career.

Medina determines that Christian adheres to a set of moral principles. King proposes that she take over his role upon his retirement, which is imminent, and continue to accept information from Christian. She declines, unable to rationalize receiving tips from a murderer. A phone call interrupts their conversation: Christian's partner has called the phone in the vacant house to provide him with a lead regarding Living Robotics.

Christian goes to Lamar's mansion and fights through the waiting team of mercenaries protecting Lamar, during which he is injured. It is revealed that their leader, the man who killed Chilton, is Wolff's younger brother Braxton, as he recognizes Wolff chanting the Solomon Grundy rhyme. During their ensuing fight Braxton blames Christian for their father's death. They reconcile and Braxton allows Christian to kill Lamar, even though it will upset his superiors. Christian promises to meet with Braxton before he leaves.

In the aftermath, another set of parents visit Harbor Neuroscience. They meet Justine, the daughter of the clinic's director, who is revealed to be Christian's business partner. Medina accepts her new role as Christian's contact and speaks at a press conference on the Treasury's investigation into Living Robotics.

Dana receives a framed copy of Dogs Playing Poker but discovers an original Jackson Pollock painting from Christian's Airstream hidden underneath it. In the final scene, Christian is shown driving on a country road with his Airstream in tow.

== Cast ==
- Ben Affleck as Christian Wolff / The Accountant, an autistic accountant and professional hitman who “audits financial books” for some of the most dangerous criminals in the world.
  - Seth Lee as young Accountant
- Anna Kendrick as Dana Cummings, an accountant at Living Robotics who notices the irregularities with their books.
- J. K. Simmons as Raymond King, the Director of the Treasury Department's FinCEN. King built a career out of following leads from Wolff after meeting him years earlier on a stakeout.
- Jon Bernthal as Braxton, The Accountant's brother. He operates a security company for high-profile clients.
  - Jake Presley as young Braxton
- Cynthia Addai-Robinson as Marybeth Medina, a young Treasury agent who is tasked with finding The Accountant's real identity.
- Jeffrey Tambor as Francis Silverberg, a former bookkeeper for the Mafia. He trained The Accountant on how to launder money while they were incarcerated together.
- John Lithgow as Lamar Blackburn, the CEO of Living Robotics.
- Jean Smart as Rita Blackburn, Lamar's sister who hires Wolff to inspect the company's books.
- Andy Umberger as Ed Chilton, CFO of Living Robotics.
- Alison Wright as Justine, The Accountant's business partner. She has nonverbal autism and communicates with others via her computer. She brokers The Accountant's jobs, handles his tech needs and calls in his tips to Ray King.
  - Izzy Fenech as Young Justine
- Rob Treveiler as The Accountant's and Braxton's father. A US Army PSYOP officer who trained his sons in combat from an early age.
- Mary Kraft as The Accountant's and Braxton's mother. She walked out on her family because she was unable to deal with Christian's autism.

== Production ==
In November 2014, Ben Affleck, Jon Bernthal, Anna Kendrick, and J.K. Simmons all signed on to join the cast of the film. In January 2015, Cynthia Addai-Robinson, Jeffrey Tambor, and John Lithgow were added to the cast.

Principal photography began on January 19, 2015, in Atlanta, Georgia, with Sam Hargrave serving as second unit director and stunt coordinator. On March 16–20, filming took place at the Georgia Institute of Technology. Filming wrapped on April 2, 2015. The action sequences in the film featured the Indonesian martial art Pencak silat.

The film was shot on 35mm photochemical celluloid film stock provided by Kodak (specifically Kodak Vision3 500T 5219 film stock) on a Panaflex Millennium XL2 camera and a set of Primo prime lenses and zooms provided by Panavision for a 2.40:1 widescreen aspect ratio. Regarding the decision, cinematographer Seamus McGarvey stated, "Along with having a lot of low-light and night-time scenes, the overall aesthetic called for a sparse, stripped-down visual treatment that would mirror the autistic orderliness of the hero’s world... So along with keeping the sets structured and free from unnecessary distractions, we also drained-out the colour and stopped down the lenses to elevate the depth-of-field and sharpen the image. The action gets gradually more and more tense, and the look had to evolve into a more textured and gritty feel. The beauty of Kodak 5219 500T negative is the latitude it gives you on-set, and later in the colour grade, to handle the different looks, push the grain and contrast, and deliver a harmonised result”. McGarvey also stated that, besides fitting its noir aspects, the film wasn't shot digitally because of budget restraints, as he, O'Connor, and the producers realized that the inherent discipline of shooting on film could make filming in that format be as cost-effective, if not cheaper, than shooting digitally, especially when considering the time-consuming, significant, and sometimes costly post-processing and handling of large amounts of terabytes of data generated by digital cameras.

On July 9, 2015, a graphic novelization of the film was published by Vertigo, a limited comic-book imprint owned by Warner Bros. Pictures.

== Release ==
The film was released in the United States on October 14, 2016. Before that, Warner Bros. Pictures had scheduled it for January 29, 2016, and October 7, 2016. It held its European premiere in London on October 17, 2016.

=== Home media ===
The film was released on Digital HD on December 27, 2016, and on Blu-ray and DVD on January 10, 2017. Between January and March 2017, the film sold 463,367 DVDs and 313,279 Blu-rays for a total of $19.2 million. In April 2018, the MPAA reported it was the top-rented film of 2017 for both disc and digital.

== Reception ==
=== Box office ===
The Accountant grossed $86.3 million in the United States and Canada and $68.9 million in other countries, for a worldwide total of $155.2 million, against a production budget of $44 million.

The Accountant was released alongside Max Steel and Kevin Hart: What Now?, and was expected to gross $20–25 million from 3,332 theaters in its opening weekend, although the studio was projecting a conservative $15 million opening. The film made $1.35 million from its Thursday-night previews, more than Affleck's Gone Girl ($1.2 million) in 2014. It grossed $9.1 million on its first day and $24.7 million in its opening weekend, finishing first at the box office and was the second-highest debut for a thriller of Affleck's career, behind Gone Girl ($37.5 million). In its second weekend, the film grossed $13.6 million (a drop of 44.8%), finishing fourth at the box office.

=== Critical response ===
On the review aggregator website Rotten Tomatoes, 53% of 285 critics' reviews are positive, with an average rating of 5.7/10. The website's consensus reads: "The Accountant writes off a committed performance from Ben Affleck, leaving viewers with a scattershot action thriller beset by an array of ill-advised deductions." Metacritic, which uses a weighted average, assigned the film a score of 51 out of 100, based on 45 critics, indicating "mixed or average" reviews. Audiences polled by CinemaScore gave the film an average grade of "A" on an A+ to F scale, while those surveyed by PostTrak gave it an 84% overall positive score, with 64% saying they would definitely recommend the film.

Vince Mancini of Uproxx gave the film a positive review, writing, "It's transparent in its attempt both to pimp a future franchise and give autistic kids their own superhero. There's a genuine sweetness to the latter that converts me on the former. Headshots, math problems, and pained social interactions? Sign me up. Of the two movies Ben Affleck has been in so far this year, The Accountant and Batman v Superman, The Accountant has by far the most franchise potential." Richard Roeper of the Chicago Sun-Times gave the film 3.5 out of 4 stars, saying: "Madness abounds in The Accountant, an intense, intricate, darkly amusing, and action-infused thriller that doesn't always add up, but who cares, it's BIG FUN."

Richard Brody of The New Yorker panned the film, stating: "This thrill-free thriller...piles up plotlines like an overbuilt house of cards that comes crashing down at the first well-earned guffaw of ridicule."

The film was criticized by some for portrayal of autism, in part because of its violence. Laurie Stephen, director of clinical services in Altadena, California, said "it's concerning that a movie features a character with autism who has guns and engages in this kind of aggression/violence".

=== Accolades ===
Award	Date of ceremony	Category	Recipient(s)	Result	Ref(s)
Jupiter Awards	March 29, 2017	Best International Film	The Accountant	Nominated	
Jupiter Awards	March 29, 2017	Best International Actor	Ben Affleck	Nominated	
Saturn Awards	June 28, 2017	Best Thriller Film	The Accountant	Nominated	

== Sequels ==
In June 2017, a sequel was announced to be in development, with Gavin O'Connor and Bill Dubuque returning in their respective roles as director and writer. Affleck was to return in the starring role. By February 2020, Affleck confirmed that developments were ongoing, with the studio having considered retroactively turning a separate work-script that they are developing into The Accountant 2. The actor additionally expressed interest in the potential for a television series.

In September 2021, Gavin O'Connor announced that the sequel had officially been green-lit, while a third film is also being written. The sequel will incorporate Jon Bernthal's character into the plot more than the original. By January 2024, the film had officially entered pre-production with principal photography scheduled to commence in March of the same year, with Seamus McGarvey set to return as cinematographer. In March 2024, Affleck, Bernthal, Simmons and Addai-Robinson were announced to be reprising their roles for the sequel, with Amazon MGM Studios acquiring the sequel's rights from Warner Bros. (who will serve as the international distributor through an existing deal with the studio) and Affleck also serving as a producer with Matt Damon under their Artists Equity banner alongside the original film's producers. The film was released on April 25, 2025. Plans for a third film are underway.

== See also ==
- Autism spectrum disorders in the media
- Mental calculators in fiction
