= Cynthia Addai-Robinson =

American actress (born 1980)

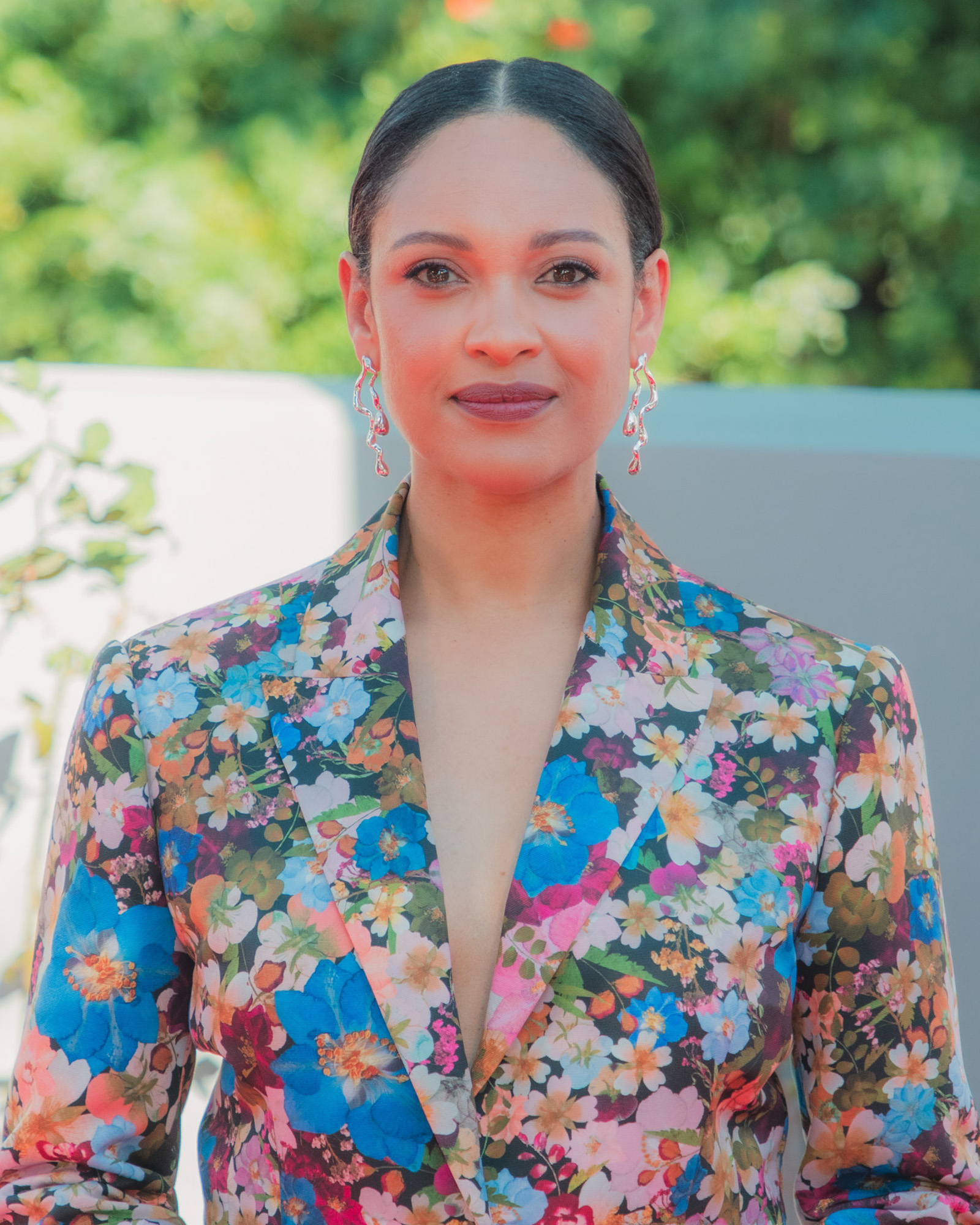
- Addai-Robinson in 2026
- Born: January 12, 1985 (age 41); London, England
- Education: New York University (BFA)
- Occupation: Actress
- Years active: 2002–present
- Known for: Naevia in Spartacus, Amanda Waller in Arrow, Nadine Memphis in Shooter

Cynthia Addai-Robinson (born January 12, 1985) is an American actress. She is known for her roles as Naevia in the Starz television series Spartacus, DC Comics character Amanda Waller in the CW TV series Arrow, and Nadine Memphis on the USA Network series Shooter. She currently plays the role of Tar-Míriel on the Amazon Prime The Lord of the Rings series The Rings of Power.

== Early life and education ==
Cynthia Addai-Robinson was born in London to a Ghanaian mother and American father. She moved to the U.S. when she was 4 and was raised by her mother in a suburb of Washington, D.C. She graduated from Montgomery Blair High School in Silver Spring, Maryland, and Tisch School of the Arts with a Bachelor of Fine Arts in theater. In addition, she trained at Lee Strasberg Theater Institute.

== Career ==
After participating in several various Off-Broadway plays, Addai-Robinson got her first role on television in 2002 in an episode of The Education of Max Bickford. In following years, she made small appearances on television shows like Law & Order: Trial by Jury, Law & Order: Criminal Intent, CSI: Miami, Numb3rs and Justice. In 2006, she was originally cast to play Melanie Barnett in the American sitcom The Game, but was replaced by Tia Mowry for unspecified reasons prior to the show's production. In 2009, she got her first recurring role on the ABC drama FlashForward as the character Debbie, a nurse. The same year she appeared in Tina Mabry's independent film Mississippi Damned as Milena.

In 2011, Addai-Robinson made her big screen debut as the mother of Zoe Saldaña's character (played by Amandla Stenberg) in Colombiana.

Her biggest role came from 2012 to 2013 when she was cast as Naevia in the third season of Spartacus: Vengeance, and the fourth season Spartacus: War of the Damned after Lesley-Ann Brandt decided to leave the series.

In early 2013, Addai-Robinson played Aja, a powerful witch who came to help Bonnie on The Vampire Diaries for two episodes. She made a brief appearance as an onlooker in the crowd in the film Star Trek Into Darkness. She played Leslie in Jodi Arias: Dirty Little Secret, a television movie about the murder of Travis Alexander. In September 2013, she was cast as the recurring character Amanda Waller in the hit The CW show Arrow.

In March 2014, she was cast as Emily D. West in the History Channel 2015 miniseries Texas Rising. Her performance was nominated for a Women's Image Network Award for Best Actress in a Drama Series.

In January 2015, Addai-Robinson was cast in Gavin O'Connor's The Accountant, alongside Ben Affleck and J. K. Simmons, playing a U.S. Treasury Department analyst. The film was released in October 2016. She reprised the role in The Accountant 2, the sequel released in April 2025.

In March 2016, it was announced that she would be taking over Emily Rios's role from the television series Shooter as the female lead.

== Filmography ==
=== Film ===
Year	Title	Role	Notes
2009	Mississippi Damned	Milena	
2011	Colombiana	Alicia	
2013	Star Trek Into Darkness	San Francisco Woman	
2016	The Accountant	Agent Marybeth Medina	
2018	Closure	Yasmina	
2018	Always & 4Ever	Nicole	
2022	The People We Hate at the Wedding	Eloise	
2025	The Accountant 2	Agent Marybeth Medina	

=== Television ===
Year	Title	Role	Notes
2002	The Education of Max Bickford	Susan	Episode: "Murder of the First"
2005	Law & Order: Trial by Jury	Lillian Beaudriville	Episode: "41 Shots"
2005	Law & Order: Criminal Intent	Jeanette	Episode: "Saving Face"
2006	Justice	Debra Mortin	Episode: "Prior Convictions"
2007	CSI: Miami	Courtney Rinella	Episode: "Internal Affairs"
2007	Dirt	Michelle / Woman	2 episodes
2007	Entourage	Amanda's Assistant #2	Episode: "Less Than 30"
2007	Life	Stephanie	Episode: "Tear Asunder"
2007	Dash 4 Cash	Meredith	Television film
2007	A.M.P.E.D.	Paige Moscavell	Television film
2009	Numb3rs	Trisha Moreno	Episode: "Guilt Trip"
2009	CSI: NY	Dr. Karita Neville	Episode: "Greater Good"
2009–2010	FlashForward	Debbie / Nurse	6 episodes
2010	Edgar Floats	Dana	Television film
2012	NCIS: Los Angeles	Female Flight Attendant	Episode: "Touch of Death"
2012–2013	Spartacus	Naevia	18 episodes
2013	The Vampire Diaries	Aja	2 episodes
2013	King & Maxwell	Megan Ainsley	Episode: "Pilot"
2013	Jodi Arias: Dirty Little Secret	Sheri	Television film
2013	CSI: Crime Scene Investigation	Michelle Rowlands	Episode: "Last Supper"
2013–2016	Arrow	Amanda Waller	17 episodes
2014	Dallas	Private Investigator	Episode: "Like Father, Like Son"
2014	Ambience Man	Megan	Episode: "Miss Period"
2015	Texas Rising	Emily West	5 episodes
2016–2018	Shooter	Nadine Memphis	31 episodes
2016–2019	Chicago Med	Vicki Glass / Dr. Vicki Glass	10 episodes
2019–2020	Power	Ramona Garrity	10 episodes
2020	Stumptown	Violet	Episode: "The Dex Factor"
2022–present	The Lord of the Rings: The Rings of Power	Tar-Míriel	6 episodes

=== Video games ===
Year	Title	Role	Notes
2011	L.A. Noire	Female Pedestrian 5	Voice role
2014	Lego Batman 3: Beyond Gotham	Amanda Waller	Voice role

== Awards and nominations ==
Year	Association	Category	Work	Result	Ref.
2015	Women's Image Network Award	Best Actress in a Drama Series	Texas Rising	Nominated	
