= Lynette Howell Taylor =

British film producer

Lynette Howell Taylor (born May 1979) is a British producer for film and television who has served as the president of Academy of Motion Picture Arts and Sciences since 2025. She was co-nominated for the Academy Award for Best Picture for producing A Star Is Born (2018). She founded the production company 51 Entertainment in 2017. She also produced the 92nd Academy Awards with Stephanie Allain.

In addition to A Star Is Born, Howell Taylor also produced the films Stephanie Daley (2006), Half Nelson (2006), Phoebe in Wonderland (2008), The Greatest (2009), Blue Valentine (2010), The Place Beyond the Pines (2012), Big Eyes (2014), Captain Fantastic (2016) and The Accountant (2016).

== Early life, education, and career ==
Taylor was born in Fazakerley, Liverpool, and lived in Crosby until she was eight when her family moved to Prenton on the Wirral. She attended Birkenhead Sixth Form College and is a graduate of the Liverpool Institute for Performing Arts.

After graduating, Taylor moved to London where she got work experience with a film and TV agent, and with a casting agent, David Grindrod. In 2001, aged 22, she moved to America. She founded her own production company, 51 Entertainment, in 2017.

== Personal life ==
Taylor resides in Los Angeles, and is married to Graham Taylor, the co-president of Fifth Season. She is the mother of three children.

== Filmography ==
Year	Title	Role	Notes
2006	Stephanie Daley	Producer	
2006	Half Nelson	Producer	
2007	The Passage	Producer	
2008	Phoebe in Wonderland	Producer	
2009	The Greatest	Producer	
2010	Blue Valentine	Producer	
2010	The Space Between	Executive producer	
2010	An Invisible Sign	Producer	
2011	Silent House	Executive producer	
2011	On the Ice	Producer	
2011	Terri	Producer	
2011	Shark Night	Producer	
2012	28 Hotel Rooms	Producer	
2012	The Place Beyond the Pines	Producer	
2012	The White Picket Fence Project	Producer	Documentary films
2013	Levitated Mass	Producer	Documentary films
2014	Alex of Venice	Producer	
2014	Kristy	Producer	
2014	Big Eyes	Producer	
2014–2015	30 for 30	Executive producer	Documentary TV films; 2 episodes
2015	Mississippi Grind	Producer	
2016	Captain Fantastic	Producer	
2016	The Accountant	Producer	
2017	Unicorn Store	Producer	
2018	6 Balloons	Executive producer	
2018	Candlelight	Executive producer	Short film
2018	A Star Is Born	Producer	
2020	Wander Darkly	Producer	
2020	The Oscars	Producer	92nd Academy Awards; TV Special
2020	I Know This Much Is True	Executive producer	TV miniseries; 6 episodes
2024	Family	Producer	
2025	The Accountant 2	Producer	
2025	Couples Weekend	Producer	
2025	Roofman	Producer	

Non-profit organization positions
Preceded by Janet Yang	President of the Academy of Motion Picture Arts and Sciences; 2025–present	Succeeded by incumbent
