= Branson Reese =

American comedic artist and writer

Branson Reese is an American comedy writer, comics artist, and podcaster. He writes the webcomic strip Swan Boy and is on the actual play podcast Rude Tales of Magic. Originally from the Washington, D.C. area, he is currently based in Los Angeles.

== Career ==
Reese originated the smooth shark meme in 2017. He posted a comic, "The Person Who Discovered Sharks", on Twitter, which ends with a person underwater saying, "Smooth lions are eating me." When others, including a self-identified scuba instructor, pointed out that shark skin is actually rough and abrasive, Reese comically doubled down, insisting shark skin was smooth, even posting an image of himself reading a paperback Stephen King novel with a crude "Sharks Are Smooth as Hell" cover pasted on.

He is the Dungeon Master for the first arc of the actual play Dungeons & Dragons podcast Rude Tales of Magic, which began in 2019. He has also been DM or a player in the podcast's other arcs. Other cast members of Rude Tales of Magic are Ali Fisher, Christopher Hastings, Joe Lepore, Carly Monardo, and Tim Platt.

His webcomic Swan Boy was named Best Webcomic by Broken Frontier in its 2018 awards. Broken Frontier also gave a positive review to his 2020 book Hell Was Full, published by Oni Press. In 2021, ten short Swan Boy animations, produced by Augenblick Studios, were included in the FXX anthology series Cake. Reese voiced the title character. He has also voice acted in other animated series (e.g., Strip Law) and podcasts (e.g., Mission to Zyxx).

Reese is the cocreator of The Kids from S.I.P.P.Y., a forthcoming Hulu animated series, with Nicole Silverberg.
