= Strip Law =

- Genre: Animated sitcom
- Created by: Cullen Crawford
- Directed by: Samantha Gray; Adam Parton; Megan Prazenica; Steven Chan
- Voices of: Adam Scott; Janelle James; Stephen Root; Shannon Gisela; Keith David
- Country of origin: United States
- Original language: English
- No. of seasons: 1
- No. of episodes: 10

Production
- Producers: Cullen Crawford; Steven Fisher; Trevor Engelson; Chris Prynoski; Shannon Prynoski; Antonio Canobbio; Ben Kalina
- Running time: 25 minutes
- Production companies: Gamblin' Cullentertainment; Underground; Titmouse, Inc.; Netflix Animation Studios

Original release
- Network: Netflix
- Release: February 20, 2026

Strip Law is an American adult animated sitcom created by Cullen Crawford for Netflix. The series is set at a law firm in a heightened version of Las Vegas and stars the voices of Adam Scott, Janelle James, Stephen Root, Shannon Gisela, and Keith David. It premiered on February 20, 2026. On May 30, 2026, the series was canceled after one season.

== Premise ==
Lincoln Gumb is a lawyer who is kicked out of his mother's law firm after her death and has to start his career over by building his own firm. He recruits a motley crew of employees and together they use their skills to fight cases.

The series is set in a hyperexaggerated version of Las Vegas soaked in advertising, violence, sex, and gambling, and the tension between Lincoln playing things by the book and the anything-goes nature of Las Vegas juries and judges is a frequent plot focus.

The series was inspired by a trip Crawford took to Las Vegas in which he and his companions noted that a large percentage of commercials they saw on the TV in their hotel room were for lawyers.

== Voice cast and characters ==
=== Main ===
- Adam Scott as Lincoln Gumb, a lawyer who is trying to establish his new law firm but struggling in court in Las Vegas given his focus on the law rather than spectacle
- Janelle James as Sheila Flambé, a street magician who Lincoln recruits to his firm as "creative director" to bring pizzazz to his courtroom presence
- Stephen Root as Glem Blorchman, a disheveled fixer and disbarred (and later un-disbarred) lawyer who works for the firm
- Shannon Gisela as Irene Gumb, Lincoln's 16-year-old niece who works as the firm's investigator
- Keith David as Steve Nichols, Lincoln's mother's former law partner at Nichols & Gumb and Lincoln's frequent courtroom opponent

=== Recurring ===
- Paget Brewster as Marcia Gumb, Lincoln's deceased mother, and Steve Nichols' former legal partner
- Branson Reese
- George Wallace as Mayor George Wallace, a fictionalized version of himself who has been elected mayor of Las Vegas
- Drew Tarver as Lunch Meat, a stripper and magician
- Ben Rodgers
- Sydney Battle
- Matt Apodaca as Kevin, an assistant at the law firm
- Jim Rash
- Mike Mitchell
- Gary Anthony Williams
- Tom Kenny

== Episodes ==
No.	Title	Directed by	Written by	Original release date
1	"Finally, a Show About Lawyers"	Samantha Gray	Cullen Crawford	February 20, 2026
Lincoln Gumb finds himself struggling to win cases in Las Vegas courtrooms where the jury and judge alike seem to care more about spectacle and entertainment than proper jurisprudence. Things go from bad to worse when Lincoln has to take on a case of a male strip club where the employees are fighting a clause in their contract forcing them to swallow metal keys if the clients demand it, and the club's owner is represented by Steve Nichols, the hotshot Vegas lawyer who fired Lincoln via TV commercial after his mother passed away. With only a day to prepare a case for the strippers and his law office struggling to stay afloat, Lincoln wanders the Vegas Strip until he comes across a street magician, Sheila Flambé, who leads him to figure out a strategy to win the favor of the judge and jury. Meanwhile, the firm's only other employees, Glem Blorchman and Irene Gumb, decide to keep the law office afloat by traveling around Vegas, collecting unpaid payments from former clients.
2	"Crypt Law Presents: Fearacle on 31st Day"	Samantha Gray	Daniel Kibblesmith	February 20, 2026
Lincoln is hired by an unkempt taxidermist from the outskirts of Vegas claiming to be the real Santa Claus, trying to stop another man who was already legally declared Santa Claus in a New York court from claiming Vegas as his territory. Irene, having her faith in Santa Claus shaken by Lincoln, reluctantly tries to help him come up with evidence against his opponent. Meanwhile, Glem and Sheila decide to play a series of escalating pranks on Steve, and then after getting bored, start pranking each other.
3	"The Bad News Bapples"	Megan Prazenica	Sean O'Connor	February 20, 2026
When Steve is sentenced by a judge to become the coach of a local youth basketball team as punishment for his DUI conviction, Lincoln is angered that he got off too lightly, and decides to coach a different ragtag group of youths in basketball just to spite him. However, with all the available youth team coaching spots taken up by similar DUI convicts from the same judge, Lincoln starts his own team using only homeschooled children, with Sheila as his assistant. Meanwhile, Glem hits the slot machines and finds himself enthralled by one that appears specifically tailored to him. Irene is trapped in the office trying to catch a talking "Baby Bertram" doll that Sheila stole earlier, but the doll keeps evading her and slowly drives her insane.
4	"Glemtastrophe: Anatomy of a Glemsaster"	Steven Chan	Miles Woods	February 20, 2026
With Glem getting un-disbarred thanks to the original judge who disbarred him being beheaded for treason, he takes on his first big case for Gumb's lawfirm: A town on the outskirts of Vegas is suffering because Vegas's wastewater has leaked into the town's own groundwater, turning it into 120-proof alcohol. However, Glem's legal attempts to help the town only make things worse for everyone, until Irene accidentally gives him an idea to turn things around on appeal. Meanwhile, a local judge swears to break the record for most cases tried in the state before he retires, forcing Lincoln and Sheila to re-think their winning strategy as the judge loads up all of Lincoln's cases to be heard in the same week, and forces Sheila to take the part of the District Attorney on the final case.
5	"The People vs. Magicians vs. Animals: Dawn of Justice: Whoever Wins... TA-DA!"	Megan Prazenica	Edgar Momplaisir	February 20, 2026
An animal rights activist hires Lincoln to stop the people behind Magicians vs. Animals from putting on their big 30th show, as each show results in animals being tortured or slaughtered for the audience's entertainment. Lincoln attempts to collect evidence against the show led by "The Great Bargatze" but appears to be stymied at every turn, while Sheila seems strangely reluctant to help him, until he finds out the truth of what the show is really doing to the animals. Meanwhile, Glem and Irene decide to take driver's education courses in a simulated town called Autostate, run by a failed actor, and take over the fictional town when they get bored with the lesson plan that he set up.
6	"Rocco Prosecco's Virtual Reality Workplace Sensitivity Experience"	Steven Chan	Lauren McGuire	February 20, 2026
While Vegas erupts in a riot over the redesigned "Nevada Hot Dates" mascots, Lincoln makes his office take a HR training seminar so the law firm can stay licensed in the state. The seminar takes place in a virtual reality ballroom, hosted by an amalgamation of the Rat Pack in the character of "Rocco Prosecco." While the firm's members (including new paralegal Kevin) go through the challenges, the system plays clips of their offscreen hijinks on themselves and each other. Eventually, the firm clears the training module and finds out the score was participation-based, and are able to leave the VR world, just in time for the rioters outside to be pacified by the Hot Dates adding a new mascot to their original lineup.
7	"I Was a Teenage Lawbert"	Samantha Gray	Tamara Yajia	February 20, 2026
When the star of the Gumb-Flambé lawfirm's ad becomes too controversial to keep, Lincoln entrusts Sheila, Irene, and Kevin with editing him out of the video, but Sheila takes her new Creative Director duties too far and Irene gets too caught up in her new mascot character, Lawbert. Meanwhile, Glem shows Lincoln his mastery of emotional manipulation as they go through voir dire for an upcoming case.
8	"We Need to Talk About Heaven"	Samantha Gray	Branson Reese	February 20, 2026
Young televangelist Dilterton Timble, "The Boy Who Saw Heaven," is at the center of a custody battle when his mother, Debra, wants a divorce while his father wants Dilterton to medically die again to see Heaven a second time. Despite Lincoln's desire for a "normal case," the judge presiding over the case and the opposing attorney force him to prove that God isn't real, with the ensuing publicity convincing Lincoln to become the Atheist Lawyer. Meanwhile, Sheila and Irene try to "honeyboy" Dilterton and turn him against his father. Glem, feeling left out, tries to one-up Kevin at the office.
9	"Trophy Son (Or 'The Mother Wound')"	Steven Chan	Andrew Mueth	February 20, 2026
At the Golden Gavels, an awards show for lawyers across Vegas, the memory of Lincoln's mother, Marcia Gumb, hangs over the ceremony for both Lincoln and Steve as they try to prove to the other which one is her real successor. Meanwhile, Sheila tries to hide her "broken pussy," Irene's new boyfriend is a puppeteer, and Glem tries to hide from a man who wants to duel him to settle a score from 30 years ago.
10	"Finale: A Show About Lawyers"	Megan Prazenica	Emma Del Valle & Cullen Crawford	February 20, 2026
Pringus and Bench, two hotshot lawyers from the Winthrop & Associates firm in Carson City, are trying to win one last case before they move on with their lives: Defending the makers of "Toilet 2" against the small Vegas lawfirm of Gumb-Flambé.

== Reception ==
The review aggregator website Rotten Tomatoes reported a 77% approval rating based on 13 critic reviews. Metacritic, which uses a weighted average, gave a score of 50 out of 100 based on 9 critics, indicating "mixed or average" reviews.
