= Mission to Zyxx =

- Genre: Improvisational comedy; Space opera; Science fiction
- Language: English

Creative team
- Written by: Alden Ford; Allie Kokesh; Jeremy Bent; Seth Lind; Winston Noel; Moujan Zolfaghari

Cast and voices
- Starring: Alden Ford; Allie Kokesh; Jeremy Bent; Seth Lind; Winston Noel; Moujan Zolfaghari
- Narrated by: Jeremy Crutchley

Technical specifications
- Audio format: Podcast

Publication
- No. of seasons: 5
- No. of episodes: 99 (+ specials)
- Original release: September 6, 2017 – September 23, 2022
- Provider: AudioBoom (seasons 1–2); Maximum Fun (seasons 3–5)

Related
- Website: Official website

Mission to Zyxx is a space opera comedy podcast series, created by and starring Alden Ford, Allie Kokesh, Jeremy Bent, Seth Lind, Winston Noel, and Moujan Zolfaghari. The series premiered on September 6, 2017 and concluded its run on September 22, 2022 with the completion of its fifth season. The series was produced on the AudioBoom network for its first two seasons, before switching to Maximum Fun for the remainder of its run.

Mission to Zyxx is a science fiction story set in a fictional universe where most of the known galaxy is under the authority of the Federated Alliance. It follows a crew tasked with acting as Federation ambassadors in the Zyxx Quadrant, an isolated part of space, to establish diplomatic relations with the inhabitants of its many planets. The overall story arc revolves around the crew progressively coming to revolt against the Federation and confronting threats to the universe. 99 episodes were released, alongside a number of special episodes, mostly Christmas-themed, shorter, or performed live in front of an audience, which are also part of the series' continuity.

The series features almost exclusively improvised dialogue from its cast members, which are typically given a setting for each episode; it features an overall narrative arc, while focusing on mostly self-contained episodes. The six creators form the main voice cast, usually starring in each episode as the show's main characters alongside a guest actor portraying a character centric to the episode. The recorded dialogue is later edited for pacing by Ford and Bent, with Shane O'Connell adding music and sound effects reflecting the events featured in the story.

In March 2025, the team announced a prequel series called The Young Old Derf Chronicles, which would focus on the character of Old Derf, played by Justin Tyler.

== Synopsis ==
Mission to Zyxx takes place in the Zyxx Quadrant, a relatively isolated and lawless part of space. The Federated Alliance, which recently overthrew the Galactic Monarchy, the previous government, sends a crew of four on a diplomatic mission to Zyxx in order to establish relations with local planets and recruit them to join the Federated Alliance. The crew consists of the Bargarean Jade or "Bargie," a sentient ship and former acting star, and her three occupants: Pleck Decksetter, a young farmboy who recently joined the Alliance; Dar, the crew's security officer; and C-53, a Protocol and Diplomatic Relations Droid, all working under the remote supervision of operations manager Nermut Bundaloy.

In the first season, the crew of the Bargarean Jade accumulates failed attempts at establishing diplomatic relations; meanwhile, they progressively uncover the Federated Alliance's growing corruption. Pleck meets Old Derf, a "Zima warrior" who claims to fight for the "Fresh Side" of an all-encompassing force known as "The Space." Old Derf claims Pleck is the prophesied "Chosen One": another Zima Warrior and Avatar of the Fresh destined to the unite the two sides of the Space, the Fresh Side and the Wack Side. He warns Pleck to beware of "Nermut Bundaloy," whom he surprisingly claims is the Avatar of the Wack Side. The crew obtains an ancient bean-shaped artifact, opting not to return it to the Alliance. The Council of Seven, the Alliance's corrupt leaders, mistakenly identify the crew as part of the Rebellion attempting to overthrow them. They capture Nermut, intent on executing him. In a desperate rescue attempt, the crew manages to both save Nermut and destroy the Delegator, the famous Alliance ship he is a prisoner aboard. Although they are welcomed into the Rebellion, credit for the destruction of the Delegator is given to another crew, leaving them to serve in the Rebellion as nobodies.

In the second season, the crew continues to attempt to establish diplomatic relations with planets of the Zyxx Quadrant, this time on behalf of the Rebellion. They now travel with Beano, a strange being hatched from the ancient artifact obtained during season 1. The situation becomes desperate when the crew learns that The Council of Seven is traveling to Zyxx with a Planet Crusher -- a gigantic spaceship capable of destroying planets -- to annihilate Resistance headquarters. Following infighting conflicts, ostracized Councillor Ballwheat uses a Planet Crusher Crusher to kill the six other Council members, destroy Resistance headquarters, and crown himself 'Emperor Nermut Bundaloy' (coincidentally the same name as the crew's operation manager, therefore fulfilling Old Derf's prophecy), establishing absolute control over the galaxy. Beano saves the crew's lives, but reverts to being an inanimate bean in the process. In his last moments, he uses his powers to grant the crew one wish; Bargie abruptly wishes to become a successful actress once again.

The third season starts an unspecified amount of time after the season 2 finale. After being abandoned by Bargie so she could resume her revitalized career, the rest of the crew has separated and lives in hiding from Emperor Bundaloy, who now rules the galaxy with an iron fist. After the Emperor sends squads of C.L.I.N.T.s, the clone soldiers under his command, to kill the former crewmates, they reunite to survive, with the addition of AJ, a defecting C.L.I.N.T. As the crew travels through Zyxx in an attempt to find a way to fight the Emperor, it becomes clear that Bargie is in deep legal and financial trouble. The crew encounters former Zima Knight Kor Balevore, who has been imprisoned and nearly seduces Pleck to the Wack Side before breaking free and escaping. Bargie gets captured, and is put on trial for "financial murder." Although she is ruled innocent, the Emperor uses this opportunity to attack the crew once again, hoping to get his hands on a revived Beano, which would allow him to unleash the full power of the Wack. Although Pleck stops Bundaloy from fully obtaining Beano's power, Kor Balevore helps the Emperor fuse with Beano and the Planet Crusher Crusher to become The Allwheat, a black hole-like consuming entity.

In the fourth season, the Allwheat continues to exist and consume its surroundings, seemingly unstoppable. The disappearance of the Emperor left a huge political hole, leading to countless power conflicts across the galaxy. In an effort to unite the galaxy and find a way to deal with the Allwheat, the crew, who now also travels with Dar's newborn child Horsehat, starts working for Seesu Gundu, a former Resistance commander who seeks to become the galaxy's new ruler. As they help Seesu campaign throughout Zyxx, the crew encounters Dame Wiggles, an ancient time traveler. Having been taunted by the telepathic voice of the fused Emperor and Beano, Pleck plunges inside the Allwheat. The crew follows, attempting to save him. The Emperor reveals it was his plan to lure Pleck inside the Allwheat, as he intends to use the accumulated powers of Beano, the Wack Side, and the Fresh Side to eradicate all life in the universe but that of the members of his and Pleck's species. Despite being fused with him, Beano rebels when the Emperor attempts to harm the crew, resulting in the Allwheat's destruction; the Bargarean Jade, with both the crew and Seesu Gundu's family aboard, falls through a rift in reality.

Season five starts after the Bargarean Jade drifted into the unknown for several months before crashing onto a planet devoid of sentient life, on which the crew, together with Seesu Gundu and her family, have remained stranded, far away from anything known to the natives of their original galaxy. After finally achieving lift-off, they make contact with the Coalition Of United Planets, or C.O.U.P., the leading organization of this part of the universe; with a return to Zyxx impossible in the near future, they are hired by the C.O.U.P. as galactic ambassadors while the organization works on finding a way to send them back. The crew attempts to complete missions for the C.O.U.P., to varying degrees of success. C-53's consciousness is transferred into a humanoid frame. The C.O.U.P.'s flagship is attacked by the K'hekk, an insectoid hive-mind collective led by the Grower Mind, who still harbors feelings for Bargie, its ex. The Grower Mind demands the Bargarean Jade and her crew travel to its homeworld to meet Bargie's supposed 'son,' Grobo. Narrowly escaping the Grower Mind's clutches and, using C.O.U.P. tech and K'hekk soldiers manipulated by C-53's newly-K'hekk-infected frame, the crew finally creates a space-time portal and returns to the Zyxx quadrant. They return to find the galaxy in disarray, led by a clone of the real Nermut Bundaloy, who serves as a puppet president for the resurfaced Kor Balevore. Realizing that Balevore has stolen Dame Wiggles's time-traveling cane, intent on vengeance, the crew makes a last-ditch attempt to stop the Wack sorcerer once and for all.

== Cast and characters ==
=== Main cast ===
In addition to their main roles, cast members also portray several key recurring characters and many minor one-off characters.

- Alden Ford as Pleckthaniel Ugene Decksetter, or simply "Pleck", a farm-boy and young member of the human-like Tellurian species from the planet Rangus VI. Clumsy, and often responsible for the crew's shortcomings, but friendly and well-meaning, he trains as a "Zima Warrior," a being defending the "Fresh Side," the positive side of a force known as "The Space," and aiming to defeat its negative side, the "Wack Side." Pleck is led to believe he is the fated "Chosen One," the universe's only hope against the Wack Side.
- Allie Kokesh as:
  - Dar, the crew's security officer. A non-gender, nonbinary, hypersexual, and omnisexual being who belongs to a species of nearly identical large beings whose name is unpronounceable to other species, Dar is resourceful and incredibly strong, but can be rude and unpredictable. They begin an on-off relationship with Nermut Bundaloy before becoming asexually pregnant with an infant she later names Horsehat and co-parents with Nermut.
  - C-RED-I-T-5, a "credits and attributions droid", a robot who provides credits to the audience at every episode's end.
- Jeremy Bent as C-53, a Protocol and Diplomatic Relations Droid identifying as male with encyclopedic knowledge of the universe. C-53's consciousness exists within a cube, which is placed into a "frame", or machine, that he then controls directly; he changes frames several times over the course of the series, and his mysterious past is gradually revealed throughout each season.
- Seth Lind as Operations Manager Nermut Sylvester Bundaloy, who gives the crew their missions and receives their mission reports afterwards. Instead of being aboard the Bargarean Jade, he communicates with the crew via hologram; he later develops a romance with Dar, and comes to be physically involved in several of their missions. Friendly but insecure, and aged twenty-three at the beginning of the series, he is a Lird, a small species similar to birds or lizards with an average life expectancy of twenty-six. His official job title changes throughout the series, although he remains an operations manager; he is also an aspiring musician under the pseudonym Bermut Nundaloy.
- Winston Noel as:
  - The Clone Light Infantry Nomadic Troopers, or simply "C.L.I.N.T.s," Tellurian clone soldiers who enforce the laws of the Federated Alliance. Needlessly aggressive and mentally limited, the C.L.I.N.T.s never get along with each other, and are generally unfit at working together. They are physically modeled after Rolphus Tiddle (also voiced by Noel), the Commander of the Rebellion, and often act as secondary antagonists.
  - Councilor Gunther Ballwheat, later Emperor Nermut Bundaloy, the main antagonist of the first four seasons of the series; originally a member of the Council of Seven who head the Federated Alliance, he is belittled and plotted against by his supposed 'friends.' However, Ballwheat has ambitions of his own, eventually taking on the title and name of Emperor Nermut Bundaloy after becoming supreme ruler of the galaxy in the season 2 finale.
  - The Beanochron, or simply "Beano", a strange, childlike being resembling a bean with limbs. Introduced in season 2, he hatched from a bean the crew acquired in season 1, and travels alongside them.
  - AJ-2884, a defected C.L.I.N.T. introduced in season 3, when he develops a near-instant loyalty to Pleck, whom he sees as both a mentor and father figure. He is genuine and always eager to help, but his low intellect and short attention span lead him to have a very limited understanding of most situations. He is later retconned to be the very first C.L.I.N.T. introduced in the series, encountered by Pleck at the beginning of the series premiere.
- Moujan Zolfaghari as:
  - The Bargarean Jade, or simply "Bargie", the sentient spaceship the crew lives and travels in. She sometimes identifies as female and used to be a popular and successful actress, having starred in many holos (the series' equivalent to cinema and television) before her career went downhill. She is self-centered, uncaring, and unreliable, sometimes acting on a whim regardless of the crew's missions or well-being, although she gradually warms to them. In season 3, she decides to get a new identity and changes her official name to "B4Яj13", which is still pronounced "Bargie".
  - Seesu Gundu, a Commander in the Rebellion. A key recurring character in the first three seasons, she becomes central to the plot of season 4, in which the crew attempts to help her be elected leader of the galaxy.
  - Justin Ballwheat, a character introduced in the season 4 finale as having been part of the crew of the Bargarean Jade since the beginning of the series, although only Bargie herself was previously aware that he was onboard. The rebellious teen son of Emperor Nermut Bundaloy, he is in a relationship with Centurion Tiddle, the son of Rolphus Tiddle and Seesu Gundu. He continues to travel with the crew in season 5, although he only occasionally takes part in their missions.

=== Recurring guests ===
Characters appearing in at least two episodes, not voiced by members of the main cast. Appearances during the canon advertising breaks are counted, with appearances in special episodes counted as part of the seasons during which said episodes were released.

- Jeremy Crutchley as the narrator (season 1–5) providing the introduction to every episode.
- John Robert Wilson as The Grower Mind of the K'hekk (season 1–5), a being who remotely inhabits the bodies of many other beings, assimilating others into the K'hekk, the beings it controls. It used to be close to Bargie and claims to still love her.
- Justin Tyler as Derf Dinkleson, or "Old Derf", “Older Derf” or “Oldest Derf” (season 1–5), a member of the Tellurian species and a Zima Warrior, who teaches Pleck about the Space and tells him that he is fated to lead the battle of the Fresh Side against the Wack Side. He used to be known as "Young Derf", but spent so many years waiting for Pleck that he is now old. Previous to living on Asteroid 951-N in the Krin-Kryn Belt with his wife and children, waiting to meet Pleck there as prophesied, he worked as a dentist, and incidentally, was Pleck’s father’s dentist.
- Jon Gabrus as B-69-420 (season 1, 3), a "roast droid" reconverted into a lifter droid. He is destroyed after meeting the crew, but is revived as a dehumidifier in the season 3 live episode "Crank the Dehumidifier".
- Jordan Carlos as IQQ (season 1, 4–5), a Tellurian with six eyes who works in a red-light district on the outskirts of Zyxx.
- Zach Cherry as Peter3Fab (season 1, 5), a bounty hunter whose work revolves heavily around paperwork, and a member of the famous bounty hunting family group "Fab 3”. He later changes his first name to “Peter 1”, and then to “3Pete”, or "3Peter" to close friends. He brriefly adopts Dar’s child Horsehat with his partner “Sand-robot”, or “Sandra-bot”, when he is unable to follow through on assassinating the child.
- Michael Cruz Kayne as Chad (season 1, 5), "The Riddlemaster", keeper of the Beanochron on the planet Redacted, who only lets travelers who correctly answer his riddles acquire his treasure.
- Leslie Collins as Miss Janelle Fitzmeyer (season 2–5), the creator of the C.L.I.N.T.s. Friendly and amicable, she is also the estranged mother of Rolphus Tiddle, and made the C.L.I.N.T.s. in her son's image using his DNA.
- Jonathan Braylock as Two (season 2, 5), a powerful being who can alter reality. Works for The Singularity, an organization working under the Beanochron, testing species' worthiness to live, and eradicating them from ever existing if they fail random tests. When Beano dies briefly (season 4,5) all members of The Singularity lose their powers.
- Rachel Wenitsky as Marf (season 3–5), a gift shop owner and treasure collector who is a prodigy naturally gifted with The Space. On a journey of her own, she later encounters Old Derf, who takes her as his new protegee and scratches Pleck's name off the prophecy to replace it with hers.
- Brennan Lee Mulligan as Corey "Kor" Balevore (season 3, 5), a mostly cyborg being and former Zima Warrior who turned to the Wack Side. Originally aligned with Emperor Nermut Bundaloy, he later replaces him as main antagonist for the final season.
- Frank Garcia Hejl as Dad (season 3, 5), Dar's sole parent. Dies and buried in two places, then resurrected only to be cut into 3 pieces by 3Pete when taking Horsehat.
- Ellena Doe as Oak Tree (season 3, 5), a droid who befriends C-53.
- Riley Solonger as Flix Dunker (season 3, 5), a young droid and skilled hacker. His hacker alias is Netflix.
- Morgan Grace Jarrett as Jan (season 3), an Oracle who is the mother of 9 million different lifeforms on the planet Kirkland. Provides Pleck with the passcode for Tom Wellington’s Zima Prime login used by most Zima Warriors, and supplied by Old Derf: BumpyRoad168.
- Branson Reese as Timmis (season 4), a being who lived inside AJ's helmet, where microorganisms evolved to reach sentience and form a civilization. When AJ washes his helmet, Timmis' civilization is destroyed, leading him to rebel against AJ and beat Dar at arm wrestling.
- Eric Gersen as Jakk, Father of Shai'An (season 5), a being from a planet whose inhabitants communicate via music. He is physically attached to his son Shai'An, Son of Jakk, with whom he shares a body, and plays the piano while his son sings. Last of his species as they were all killed because they were given the same sheet music, and unison kills and destroys this species. The crew harmonize with Shia’An, Son of Jakk and bring all his species back from the dead.

== Format ==
=== Production ===
The podcast is improvised by its comedian cast and recorded by Shane O'Connell, who also performs subsequent sound design and mixing. Editing is done by Seth Lind, Alden Ford, and Jeremy Bent. Each week there is a special guest comedian who plays an inhabitant of the Zyxx Quadrant that encounters the crew. The guest pitches two or three episode ideas to the main cast, and one is picked that fits best with the story arc of the show. Filmmaker Magazine interviewed the cast and highlighted the combination of improv comedy and longform narration as a major source of creativity and freedom for the podcast.

The cast of the show are veterans of improv comedy performance, with all having performed with Upright Citizens Brigade and separately or in smaller groups with other improv casts. Additional credits include writing, performing and directing comedy content/shows such as CollegeHumor and UCB Comedy Originals (Alden Ford, Jeremy Bent, Winston Noel), The Good Cop (Allie Kokesh), Last Week Tonight and Unbreakable Kimmy Schmidt (Moujan Zolfaghari). Co-creator Seth Lind is director of operations at the highly successful podcasts This American Life, Serial, and S-Town. Shane O'Connell, the show's sound engineer and designer, has worked with Ben Harper, Half Waif, and NAO.

=== Episode structure ===
Podcast episodes are about 30 minutes, edited down from an initial 60–90 minute recording. Each episode opens with an opening crawl narration by Jeremy Crutchley. As the story progresses, the narration changes to reflect the happenings of the Zyxx Quadrant, the Tremillion Sector, and the entire galaxy. The show also occasionally releases live episodes set in previous eras/seasons.

Each episode typically follows a similar structure: the crew interacts before Nermut calls to give them a new diplomatic mission. Arriving on their assigned planet, the crew encounters a denizen (played by a guest) who is part of a problem in need of solving. The characters then work together to solve the problem, though they often fail in their overall missions. Back onboard Bargie, the crew debriefs with Nermut. Every episode ends with the Bargarean Jade rocketing through space. The penultimate episode of each season focuses on a different group of characters from the normal crew, allowing listeners a different perspective on events in the Zyxx universe before the season finale.

=== Advertising breaks ===
Like many podcasts, Mission to Zyxx generates revenue through sponsored advertisements in the form of advertising breaks. This podcasts is unusual, however, as these are done by the voice actors or guests as minor characters from the show, delivered in-character. The ad breaks are canon, consistent with the show's characterizations and events, occasionally delivering minor plot points or foreshadowing for the main storyline.

== Episodes ==
Season	Episodes	Originally released	
Season	Episodes	First released	Last released
1	18	April 17, 2017	January 3, 2018
2	20	March 20, 2019	June 30, 2019
3	20	August 14, 2019	June 9, 2019
4	20	February 19, 2020	October 19, 2020
5	21	April 28, 2021	September 23, 2022

=== Season 1 ===
The Alliance's newest recruit is Ambassador Pleck Decksetter, a naive, gung-ho farm boy whose crew includes trusty, know-it-all droid C-53, and hulking, omnisexual security officer DAR. They travel aboard the outdated, sentient starship The Bargerian Jade – aka Bargie – who has as many ex-husbands as stories about her glory days. Their mission is nominally overseen by junior Missions Operation Manager Nermut Bundaloy, a striving, entry-level bureaucrat yearning for respect.

No. overall	No. in season	Title	Title reference	Guest comedian	Original air date
1	1	All Hail the Federated Alliance!		None	September 6, 2017
2	2	Nermie, I Shrunk the Crew	Honey, I Shrunk the Kids	Sasheer Zamata	September 13, 2017
3	3	What Happens on Magnifiku	What happens in Vegas, stays in Vegas	Connor Ratliff	September 20, 2017
4	4	Assimilation Is Futile	Assimilation in Star Trek	John Robert Wilson	September 27, 2017
5	5	A Critical Vulnerability	The critical vulnerability of the Death Star	John Murray	October 4, 2017
6	6	Dust-Up at the Diner		Lauren Adams	October 11, 2017
7	7	The (Redacted)		Michael Cruz Kayne	October 18, 2017
8	8	Grt Milk?	Got Milk?	Zach Cherry	October 25, 2017
9	9	This Juckin' Guy		Jon Gabrus	November 1, 2017
10	10	The Worry with Wiffles	The Trouble with Tribbles	Lorraine Cink	November 8, 2017
11	11	It's Hard Out Here for a Blimp	It's Hard out Here for a Pimp	Jordan Carlos	November 15, 2017
12	12	Jumped by a Shark	Jumping the shark	Josh Patten	November 22, 2017
13	13	Dead Subquadrant's Got Talent	Got Talent	Caitlin Puckett	November 29, 2017
14	14	There Are No Second Chances		Lydia Hensler	December 6, 2017
15	15	The Space Awakens	Star Wars: Episode VII - The Force Awakens	Justin Tyler	December 13, 2017
16	16	X-Marse in Chimnacia	X-MAS	Paul F. Tompkins	December 20, 2017
17	17	The One with the Council of Seven	Friends, in which many episode titles begin, "The One with..."	None	December 27, 2017
18	18	The Delegator		None	January 3, 2018

=== Season 2 ===
After defecting from the Federated Alliance, the crew joins the Rebellion.

No. overall	No. in season	Title	Title reference	Guest comedian	Original air date
19	1	Long Live the Rebellion!		None	May 20, 2018
20	2	The New Norm	New normal	Dru Johnston	May 6, 2018
21	3	Sea World According to Gerp	The World According to Garp	Ali Gordon	June 13, 2018
22	4	Pro of Cons	Weighing the pros and cons before making a decision	Nicole Drespel	June 20, 2018
23	5	Allen: Resurrection	Alien Resurrection	John Robert Wilson	June 27, 2018
24	6	Dependents Day	American Independence Day	Laura Wilcox	July 4, 2018
25	7	A Phoenix Raises	The mythical bird the phoenix, which rises from its own ashes	Christopher Scott and Matt Little	July 11, 2018
26	8	It’s Not You, It’s Rolphus	The phrase “it’s not you, it’s me,” stereotypically used in breakups	Alex Song	July 18, 2018
27	9	Altar Boy		Lennon Parham	July 25, 2018
28	10	A Wing and a Repair	The phrase "on a wing and a prayer"	Sebastian Conelli	August 1, 2018
29	11	Shmorby and the Beast	Beauty and the Beast	Bobby Moynihan	August 8, 2018
30	12	Crystal Boo-Boo Persuasion	Crystal Blue Persuasion by Tommy James and the Shondells	Arnie Niekamp, Adal Rifai, and Matt Young	August 15, 2018
31	13	Attack Some of the Clones	Star Wars: Episode II - Attack of the Clones	Leslie Collines	August 22, 2018
32	14	The Crews’ Ship	Cruise ship	Rekha Shankar	August 29, 2018
33	15	Two Who?	Q (Star Trek)	Jonathan Braylock	September 5, 2018
34	16	Oh, Zima’s Back	Everybody (Backstreet's Back) by Backstreet Boys	Justin Tyler	September 12, 2018
35	17	Pee-Nee’s Playlist	Pee-Wee's Playhouse	Yoni Lotan	September 19, 2018
36	18	The Prattle of Sistoo		Brandon Scott Jones	September 26, 2018
37	19	Tiny Toots’ Adventures	Tiny Toons Adventures	None	October 3, 2018
38	20	Crush Into Me	Crash into Me by Dave Matthews Band	None	October 10, 2018

=== Season 3 ===
The crew tries to find allies to fight against the Emperor, after he overthrows the Council of Seven and takes control of the Federated Alliance.

No. overall	No. in season	Title	Title reference	Guest comedian	Original air date
39	1	Down With the Emperor!		None	March 20, 2019
40	2	Jennifer’s Bargie	Jennifer's Body	Riley Soloner	March 27, 2019
41	3	A Quiet Place	A Quiet Place	Cathryn Mudon	April 3, 2019
42	4	Unaccompanied Miner	Unaccompanied minor	Zach Broussard	April 10, 2019
43	5	Bad Grandma	Bad Grandpa	Rachel Pegram	April 17, 2019
44	6	The Fresh Connection	French Connection	Rachel Wenitsky	April 24, 2019
45	7	The Magnificent Kevin	The Magnificent Seven	Lou Gonzalez	May 1, 2019
46	8	One Wedding and a Funeral	Four Weddings and a Funeral	Justin Tyler	May 8, 2019
47	9	Jan with a Van	The phrase “man with a plan”	Morgan Chase Jarrett	May 15, 2019
48	10	Eightal Attraction	Fatal Attraction	Tami Sagher	May 22, 2019
49	11	Prime the Pipe	The phrase "Prime the pump"	Justin McElroy	May 29, 2019
50	12	Are You There, Rodd? It’s Me, Goerlich	Are You There God? It's Me, Margaret.	Monique Moses	June 12, 2019
51	13	Well Hello, Partner		Johnathan Fernandez	June 19, 2019
52	14	Kitty’s Pancake House		Ellena Doe	June 26, 2019
53	15	Scatting in the Shower	Singing in the shower and scat singing	Frank Garcia Hejl	July 3, 2019
54	16	Chez Bargez		Don Fanelli	July 10, 2019
55	17	Retreat Yourself	The phrase “treat yourself”	Jackie Jennings	July 17, 2019
56	18	Malice in Chains	Alice in Chains	Brennan Lee Mulligan	July 24, 2019
57	19	Pump Up the Justice	Pump Up the Jam by Technotronic	None	July 31, 2019
58	20	The Emperor Strikes Wack	Star Wars: Episode V - The Empire Strikes Back	None	August 31, 2019

=== Season 4 ===
The crew’s war against the Emperor grows more heated after he transforms into the dreaded Allwheat.

No. overall	No. in season	Title	Title reference	Guest comedian	Original air date
59	1	Beware the Allwheat!		None	February 19, 2020
60	2	The Snuff That Screams Are Made Of	“The stuff that dreams are made of,” an often quoted line from The Maltese Falcon that paraphrases The Tempest	David Bluvband	February 26, 2020
61	3	The Floyda Project	The Florida Project, the original codename for Disney World	Clara Morris	March 4, 2020
62	4	Drama Not Found	404 error message, which often reads “page not found” or “file not found”	Timothy Dunn	March 10, 2020
63	5	A More Prefect Union	The preamble to the constitution of the United States of America, which says, “...in order to form a more perfect union…”	Jordan Carlos	March 18, 2020
64	6	Welcome to the Bureau	Puns off bureau as an agency and bureau as a piece of furniture	Becky Chicoine	March 25, 2020
65	7	Come to Your Census	The phrase “come to your senses”	Ryan Karels	April 1, 2020
66	8	Brihx or It Didn’t Happen	Pics or it didn't happen	Oscar Montoya	April 15, 2020
67	9	Rock the Pote	Rock the Vote	Chrissy Shackelford	April 29, 2020
68	10	Innerpaste	Innerspace	Branson Reese	May 13, 2020
69	11	Sisterhood of the Traveling Plants	Sisterhood of the Traveling Pants	Natasha Vaynblat	May 27, 2020
70	12	Same Shit, Derfrent Day	The phrase “same shit, different day”	Justin Tyler	June 10, 2020
71	13	Torto Troopers Assemble!	Power Rangers	Glo Tavarez	June 23, 2020
72	14	Good to the Last Drip	The slogan for Maxwell House coffee, “good to the last drop”	Naomi Ekperigin and Andy Beckerman	July 8, 2020
73	15	Dear Maxie	Dear Abby, and other advice columnists	Lauren Lapkus	July 22, 2020
74	16	Macho Libre	Nacho Libre	Jerah Milligan	August 7, 2020
75	17	The Daming of the Crew	The Taming of the Shrew	Alise Morales	August 21, 2020
76	18	Plastic? Oh No, Banned	Plastic Ono Band	Nathan Min	September 3, 2020
77	19	The Story of Beano		None	September 18, 2020
78	20	The Unbearable Tightness of Bean	The Unbearable Lightness of Being	None	October 19, 2020

=== Season 5 ===
The crew finds themselves stranded in a distant galaxy. Can they make it home to save their beloved quadrant?

No. overall	No. in season	Title	Title reference	Guest comedian	Original air date
79	1	O Others, Who Art Thou?!	O Brother, Where Art Thou?	None	April 28, 2021
80	2	Themm and the Holograms	Jem and the Holograms	Cody Lindquist and Charlie Todd	May 13, 2021
81	3	Good Spot Hunting	Good Will Hunting	Christine Nangle	May 27, 2021
82	4	To Jer is Hermann	"To err is human, to forgive divine,” a quote from Alexander Pope’s poem An Essay on Criticism	Ray Cordova	June 9, 2021
83	5	Being Jawn Malevolent	Being John Malkovich	James Urbaniak	June 23, 2021
84	6	The Art Supplies of War	The Art of War	Kimia Behpoornia	July 8, 2021
85	7	A Little Ditty ‘Bout Jakk and Shai’An	Jack & Diane by John Mellencamp	Chris Grace and Eric Gersen	July 26, 2021
86	8	Three Men and a Flower Baby	Three Men and a Baby	Edi Patterson	August 8, 2021
87	9	Tuck Ever ‘Flacting	Tuck Everlasting	Aparna Nancherla	August 19, 2021
88	10	The Pest of Both Worlds, Pt. 1	The Best of Both Worlds, a two part episode of Star Trek: The Next Generation	None	September 20, 2021
89	11	The Pest of Both Worlds, Pt. 2	The Best of Both Worlds, a two part episode of Star Trek: The Next Generation	John Robert Wilson	October 2, 2021
90	12	A Noob Hope	Star Wars: Episode IV - A New Hope	Justin Tyler and Rachel Wenitsky	October 31, 2021
91	13	Déjà Two	Déjà vu	Jonathan Braylock	November 10, 2021
92	14	The ‘Lapse of Luxury	The phrase "lap of luxury"	Aaron Burdette	November 27, 2021
93	15	Gary’s Home Companion	A Prairie Home Companion	Leslie Collins	December 15, 2021
94	16	Hack to the Suture	Back to the Future	Ellena Doe and Riley Soloner	January 7, 2022
95	17	Old Boy	Oldboy	Hari Kondabolu	January 20, 2022
96	18	Mr. Sand Van	Mr. Sandman	Zach Cherry	February 14, 2022
97	19	The Young Man and the S.E.A.	The Old Man and the Sea	None	April 6, 2022
98	20	The Whole Mufalata	The phrase "whole enchilada"	None	June 14, 2022
99	21	The Ass End	The Zyxx Quadrant is repeatedly referred to as “the ass end of space” throughout the series	None	September 23, 2022

=== Specials ===
Season	Title	Title reference	Original air date
1	Mailbag #1		January 28, 2018
1	Mailbag #2		March 30, 2018
2	2XM: X-Marse in Zistarkitarn	Christmas in July	December 20, 2018
2	Mailbag #3		July 3, 2019
3	Mailbag #4		August 7, 2019
3	Cube2Cube		October 30, 2019
3	Yas Boot	Das Boot	December 23, 2019
3	Zima Mailbag		January 20, 2020
3	Mailbag #5		January 22, 2020
4	Cube1000Cube		June 5, 2020
4	You’ve Got Chainmail	You've Got Mail	December 25, 2020
4	The Greeflax Hour		January 29, 2021
4	Crewdunnit?	Whodunit	February 27, 2021
4	Total Recap	Total Recall	April 3, 2021
5	It’s a Wonderful Self	It’s a Wonderful Life	December 23, 2021
6	New Year’s Mailbag		January 2, 2026

=== Live Episodes ===
Number	Title	Title reference	Guest comedian	Date recorded	Original air date	Recording location
L01	Bad Hombre		Jeff Hiller	November 6, 2017	July 22, 2018	Caveat in New York City
L02	Shiftin’ the Night Away	The lyric “pissin’ the night away” from the song Tubthumping	Alison Becker	November 19, 2017	February 6, 2019	Southern Screen Film Festival in Lafayette, Louisiana
L03	May Z 4th Be With You” from Star Wars	”May the force be with you	Keisha Zollar	January 21, 2018	February 27, 2019	Caveat in New York City
L04	My 3 Son	My Three Sons	Zach Cherry	May 22, 2018	February 28, 2019	Caveat in New York City
L05	Can’t Fight This Feeling	Can't Fight This Feeling	Sebastian Conelli	October 26, 2018	March 6, 2019	New York City
L06	Crank the Dehumidifier		Jon Gabrus	July 29, 2018	June 5, 2019	Dynasty Typewriter at the Hayworth in Los Angeles
L07	Us, Robots	I, Robot	Dru Johnston	September 15, 2019	September 24, 2019	Littlefield in Brooklyn, New York
L08	Denise the Menace	Dennis the Menace	None	June 1, 2019	October 29, 2019	PodX podcast festival in Nashville, Tennessee
L09	O Crabbo! My Crabbo!	O Captain! My Captain!	Benjamin Partridge	September 15, 2019	November 27, 2019	2019 London Podcast Festival
L10	Just the Tubes of Us	Just the Two of Us	Rachel Wenitsky	January 25, 2020	July 15, 2020	Bell House in Brooklyn, New York as part of the Brooklyn Podcast Festival
L11	Blue is the Coldest Father	Blue Is the Warmest Color	Matt Young	May 30, 3030	July 29, 2020	Livestreamed for PodUK
L12	The Host With the Moist	Host with the most	Jordan Carlos	October 3, 2021	October 13, 2021	Bell House in Brooklyn, New York
L12	THE FINALE… of Cube2Cube		David Bluvband, Jordan Carlos, Ellena Doe, Jonathan Fernandez, Aaron Gerson, Lous Gonzalez, Matt Little, Tammy Sager, and Riley Soloner	April 10, 2022	August 3, 2022	Bell House in Brooklyn, New York
L13	Past Times at Ranguu High	Fast Times at Ridgemont High	Ify Nwadiwe	January 20, 2023	February 9, 2023	Gateway Theatre as part of Sketchfest 2023 in San Francisco
L14	What Goes Throup’ Must Come Clown	What goes up must come down	Justin Tyler	June 7, 2025	June 25, 2025	Caveat in New York City

== Cultural references ==
=== Star Wars ===
Like Star Wars, Mission to Zyxx is a space opera. Zyxx makes several references to Star Wars, including the CLINTs (referencing Star Wars' Clone Troopers) and "The Space" (referencing the Force). Rather than the Force's Light and Dark sides, Zyxx has "Fresh" and "Wack," respectively. Zyxx also has Zima warriors that fight with woodsabers (sticks) – analogous to Star Wars' Jedi warriors and their lightsabers.

Characters such as Pleck Decksetter, C-53, Dar, Old Derf, Kor Balevore, Marf, and AJ-2887 are parodies of Luke Skywalker, C-3PO, Chewbacca, Obi-Wan Kenobi, Darth Vader, Rey, and Finn, respectively. Peter-3 is a parody of both Boba Fett and the eponymous protagonist of The Mandalorian. Season 5, episode 18 "Mr. Sand Van" is both a parody of Denis Villeneuve's adaptation of Dune and The Mandalorian.

=== Hello from the Magic Tavern ===
Show co-creator Alden Ford has cited the Chicago-based improv podcast Hello from the Magic Tavern set in a Narnia/Middle-Earth-like fantasy realm of Foon as an inspiration for the format of Mission to Zyxx.

=== Star Trek ===
The concept of diplomatic relations missions mirrors that of diplomat crews in the Star Trek universe, as does each episode's exploration of a different planet.

Season 1 episode "The Worry with Wiffles" has a similar plot in a direct homage to one of the most famous episodes of Star Trek, The Trouble with Tribbles.

Season 5 features an opening narration similar to the openings of Star Trek shows, unlike previous seasons, which feature narration similar to the Star Wars opening crawl. It takes place aboard the U.S.S. Synergy, a reference to the starship Enterprise, and features a coalition of united planets functioning similarly to the Federation. The Synergy's leader, Captain Syrock, behaves in a manner akin to William Shatner's portrayal of Captain Kirk; 14 year-old Ensign Phanta echoes young ingenue Wesley Crusher; and Lieutenant O'Dool is reminiscent of Enterprise engineer Montgomery Scott.

The two-part season 5 episode "The Pest of Both Worlds" is a direct homage to the two-part Star Trek: The Next Generation episode The Best of Both Worlds, noted for its cliffhanger episode. The episode also features the K'hekk, a hive-mind species which assimilates other species into its collective, similar to the Borg. The K'hekk invade the Synergy in a manner akin to Star Trek: First Contact.

The Season 5 episode "A Little Ditty 'Bout Jakk and Shain'An" loosely spoofs the Next Generation episode "Darmok".

== Reception ==
In their Culture section, Newsweek covered the production of the first series. Air & Space Magazine interviewed the cast after the first season. Vulture, an entertainment news website, listed Mission to Zyxx as one of "100 Great Podcasts Worth Listening to." The podcast was also number one on a Salon list of unpredictable improv podcasts.

Charles Pulliam-Moore of Gizmodo praised the show, calling it "the best scifi podcast you're probably not listening to...yet," and "proof that [podcasts have] still so much untapped potential, particularly for fictional work." He later reviewed Season 3, which he called "bolder" and "taking the piss out of Star Wars in the freshest way."

As of November 2019, the podcast website Podbay shows Mission to Zyxx has an average audience review of 4.8 out of 5 based on 2325 reviews.

Nick Douglas of LifeHacker wrote "Mission to Zyxx might be the best podcast. This science fiction comedy—a mix of Star Trek, Star Wars, and The Hitchhiker's Guide to the Galaxy—that leans on original jokes instead of references, is definitely the best of the current wave of fictional podcasts, partly because of its unique process." Douglas featured the podcast's cast on the How I Work series, which "asks heroes, experts, and all-around productive people to share their shortcuts, workspaces, routines, and more."

The Season 2 opener was ranked 7th in IndieWire's "The 50 Best Podcast Episodes of 2018." It was also nominated for the iHeartRadio Podcast Awards 2019 for the category "Best Scripted Podcast" (won by Wolverine: The Long Night).[

On Apple Podcasts, Mission to Zyxx has a 4.9/5.0 based on 2.6K ratings.
