= The Accountant 2 =

2025 American film

- Theatrical release poster
- Directed by: Gavin O'Connor
- Written by: Bill Dubuque
- Based on: Characters by Bill Dubuque
- Produced by: Ben Affleck; Lynette Howell Taylor; Mark Williams
- Starring: Ben Affleck; Jon Bernthal; Cynthia Addai-Robinson; Daniella Pineda; J. K. Simmons
- Cinematography: Seamus McGarvey
- Edited by: Richard Pearson
- Music by: Bryce Dessner
- Production companies: Artists Equity; 51 Entertainment; Filmtribe
- Distributed by: Amazon MGM Studios (United States) (Note: Released through the Metro-Goldwyn-Mayer banner.); Warner Bros. Pictures (International)
- Release dates: March 8, 2025 (SXSW); April 25, 2025 (United States)
- Running time: 132 minutes
- Country: United States
- Language: English
- Budget: $80 million
- Box office: $103.3 million

The Accountant 2 (stylized as The Accountant^{2}) is a 2025 American action thriller film directed by Gavin O'Connor and written by Bill Dubuque. It is the sequel to The Accountant (2016). Ben Affleck, Jon Bernthal, Cynthia Addai-Robinson and J. K. Simmons reprise their roles from the previous film, with Daniella Pineda joining the cast.

Filming for The Accountant 2 took place from March to August 2024. It premiered at the South by Southwest Festival on March 8, 2025, and was theatrically released on April 25, 2025, in the United States by Amazon MGM Studios and internationally by the original film's domestic distributor Warner Bros. Pictures. The film has grossed over $103 million worldwide on a budget of $80 million and received generally positive reviews from critics, with some considering it an improvement over its predecessor. A third film is in development.

== Plot ==
Former FinCEN director Raymond King meets with the mysterious assassin Anaïs to ask her help locating a Salvadorean family, offering only a dated photo of the parents and their young son. Anaïs does not respond to the offer but warns King he has been followed. King is killed in the ensuing gunfight while Anaïs walks away unscathed. King's protégé and current deputy director of FinCEN, Marybeth Medina, identifies his body, sees "find the accountant" written on his arm, and decides to take up the case.

Medina, despite her reservations about Christian Wolff's illegal activities, asks him for help finding the family in the photo. Wolff organizes a collage of information which shows that the family in the photo fled from El Salvador to Los Angeles, encountering various hazards along the way. Cobb, the man tasked with killing Anaïs and King, informs his supervisor Burke, who tells him to continue pursuing Anaïs, lest she realize what Burke did to her.

Christian invites his estranged brother, Braxton, still an assassin, to help with the case. Justine, still residing at the New Hampshire compound where she met Christian, works with a group of autistic children to hack into different technologies to help Christian. Their group finds a photo of Anaïs but are unable to identify her. Uncomfortable with their illegal and violent methods, Medina breaks from the group. She visits a hospital mentioned in one of King's reports, where she discovers Anaïs is the mother from the photo. They discover Anaïs was earlier involved in a car accident, causing brain damage, loss of memory and acquired savant syndrome, which includes intense combat skills.

Batu, a contractor for hitmen, sets a contract for Medina which Braxton may be asked to carryout. Wolff later sees the message on Braxton's phone and realizes that a hit has been placed on Medina, not knowing that Anaïs has been assigned to carry it out. Wolff arrives after she has been wounded by Anaïs. At Medina's, Anaïs sees the old photo of her family and regains some of her memories. She recalls that Burke was the one who murdered her husband in Juárez and forced her into his trafficking operation.

Braxton and Christian realize that Anaïs's still-living, autistic son Alberto is being held captive at a prison camp in Juarez with other children of trafficking victims, separated from their families. They assault the compound, saving Alberto and the rest of the children after killing Cobb and the other guards. Justine blackmails Batu into canceling his contract on Medina. Justine tips off Anaïs to Burke's hiding spot in Costa Rica and she kills him. Justine and the gifted children prepare to welcome Alberto to their facility in New Hampshire, and Braxton and Christian discuss going on a brotherly hiking trip in Chattahoochee.

== Cast ==
- Ben Affleck as Christian Wolff, an autistic accountant and trained killer
- Jon Bernthal as Braxton, Christian's estranged brother and a professional hitman
- Cynthia Addai-Robinson as Marybeth Medina, deputy director of the Treasury Department's FinCEN
- Daniella Pineda as Anaïs/Edith Sanchez, an amnesiac assassin and the missing Salvadoran mother
- Allison Robertson as Justine (computerized voice provided by Alison Wright), Christian's non‑speaking autistic business partner at Harbor Neuroscience
- Robert Morgan as Burke, a criminal mastermind behind the trafficking operation
- J. K. Simmons as Raymond King, the former Director of FinCEN who launches the search for the Salvadoran family
- Grant Harvey as Cobb, Burke's enforcer and King's assassin
- Andrew Howard as Batu, a contractor who arranges assassination contracts
- Lombardo Boyar as Tomas, one of the thugs in Burke's trafficking operation
- Michael Tourek as Ike Sudio, owner of a pizza factory in Burke's trafficking operation

== Production ==
In June 2017, a sequel to The Accountant was announced to be in development, with Ben Affleck set to reprise his role and Bill Dubuque and Gavin O'Connor returning to write and direct, respectively. By February 2020, Affleck confirmed that developments were ongoing, with the studio having considered retroactively turning a separate script into The Accountant 2. He also expressed interest in a potential television series.

In September 2021, O'Connor confirmed that a sequel was in development, with a possibility of a third entry. Affleck and Jon Bernthal were confirmed to reprise their roles as Christian Wolff and Braxton.

By February 2024, Amazon MGM Studios acquired distribution rights from Warner Bros. Pictures, with an estimated $10 million in qualified spending and tax incentives; Warner Bros. remained involved as the film's international distributor.

In March 2024, J. K. Simmons and Cynthia Addai-Robinson were also announced to be returning, with Daniella Pineda, Allison Robertson, Robert Morgan, and Grant Harvey joining the cast.

Principal photography began on March 25, 2024, in California, with Seamus McGarvey returning as cinematographer. Filming wrapped on August 16, 2024.

Bryce Dessner composed the score, replacing Mark Isham, who scored the original film.

== Release ==
The film premiered at South by Southwest on March 8, 2025, and was theatrically released in the United States by Amazon MGM Studios and internationally by Warner Bros. Pictures on April 25, 2025. Advanced screenings of the film took place on April 15, 2025, in honor of Tax Day. After a month and a half, it was released on Amazon Prime Video on June 5, 2025.

=== Home media ===
The Accountant 2 was released on DVD, Blu-ray and Ultra HD Blu-ray by MGM Home Entertainment (distributed via Studio Distribution Services) on August 12, 2025.

== Reception ==
=== Box office ===
The Accountant 2 grossed $65.5 million in the United States and Canada, and $37.8 million in other territories, for a worldwide total of $103.3 million.

In the United States and Canada, The Accountant 2 was released alongside Until Dawn, the wide expansion of The Legend of Ochi, and the re-release of Star Wars: Episode III – Revenge of the Sith, and was projected to gross $20–25 million from 3,610 theaters in its opening weekend. It made $9.4 million on its first day, including $2.5 million from preview screenings. The film went on to debut with $24.5 million, finishing third behind holdover Sinners and Revenge of the Sith. It made $9 million in its second weekend (a drop of 61%) then $6.7 million in its third (a 29% decrease), finishing in fourth both times.

=== Critical response ===
On the review aggregator website Rotten Tomatoes, 75% of 218 critics' reviews are positive, with an average rating of 6.2/10. The website's consensus reads: "Improving on the original by leaning into Ben Affleck and Jon Bernthal's buddy comedy chemistry, The Accountant 2 can safely be filed under a good time at the movies." Metacritic, which uses a weighted average, assigned the film a score of 58 out of 100, based on 42 critics, indicating "mixed or average" reviews. Audiences polled by CinemaScore gave the film an average grade of "A–" on an A+ to F scale, while 68% of those surveyed by PostTrak said they would definitely recommend it.

== Future ==
In September 2021, director Gavin O'Connor announced plans to turn The Accountant into a trilogy, describing the third film as a buddy film he called "Rain Man on steroids".

In April 2025, O'Connor confirmed that the third film is in development and will focus on Christian and Braxton in a road-trip format, with a lighter tone and more emotional depth. Anna Kendrick is expected to return as Dana Cummings. In June of the same year, Ben Affleck also expressed interest in completing the trilogy, deeming the films' layered structure and character development to be strengths for the project.

By May of 2026, writer Bill Dubuque confirmed that Amazon MGM is interested in a third installment.

== See also ==
- Autism spectrum disorders in the media
- Mental calculators in fiction
