= M.I.A. (TV series) =

2026 American crime drama television series

- Genre: Crime drama; Thriller
- Created by: Bill Dubuque
- Showrunner: Karen Campbell
- Starring: Shannon Gisela; Cary Elwes; Danay Garcia; Brittany Adebumola; Dylan Jackson; Alberto Guerra; Maurice Compte; Gerardo Celasco; Marta Milans
- Music by: Bear McCreary
- Country of origin: United States
- Original language: English
- No. of seasons: 1
- No. of episodes: 9

Production
- Executive producers: Bill Dubuque; Karen Campbell; Alethea Jones
- Production locations: Miami-Dade County, Florida; Florida Keys
- Running time: 38–55 minutes
- Production companies: Headhunter Films Inc.; McQuaid; MRC

Original release
- Network: Peacock
- Release: May 7, 2026

M.I.A. is an American crime drama television series created by Bill Dubuque for Peacock. Karen Campbell serves as the showrunner of the series, with Shannon Gisela starring as Etta Tiger Jonze, a young woman from the Florida Keys who goes after the cartel that murdered her family.

The nine-episode series was released on Peacock on May 7, 2026. Reviews were mixed, but the series topped Peacock's U.S. streaming chart on its first day. In September 2026, the series was canceled after one season.

== Premise ==
Etta Tiger Jonze, a 21-year-old living in the Florida Keys, discovers that her family's marina is a front for a drug-running operation tied to the Rojas cartel. Most of her family is killed in an ambush. She heads to Miami, befriends Lovely and Stanley, and works to take down the cartel from inside while hunting the men responsible.

== Cast and characters ==
=== Main ===
- Shannon Gisela as Henrietta "Etta" Tiger-Jonze
- Cary Elwes as Tim Kincaid, a Florida investigator working the Jonze case
- Danay Garcia as Leah/Carmen
- Brittany Adebumola as Lovely
- Dylan Jackson as Stanley
- Alberto Guerra as Elias Perez
- Maurice Compte as Mateo Rojas
- Gerardo Celasco as Samuel Rojas
- Marta Milans as Caroline Carver, a member of the Rojas family who launders the cartel's money through Miami real estate

=== Recurring ===
- Loretta Devine as Aunt Judith
- Tovah Feldshuh as Lena
- Tyler Tomás Perez as Matt
- Wynn Everett as Nancy
- Paul Ben-Victor as Boris Federov
- Selenis Leyva as Dr. Maribel Torres
- Mike Colter as Dominick Pierre
- Marc Macaulay as Wade Boone
- Dawn Noel as Detective Isabel
- Anthony Pyatt as Yuri

=== Guest ===
- Edward James Olmos as Isaac Rojas
- Billy Burke as Sheriff Jack Taylor
- Sonia Braga as Vida Rojas
- David Denman as Daniel Jonze
- Nikolai Nikolaeff as Kazimir
- Ashley Reyes as Gabriela
- Alyssa Jirrels as London
- Chabely Ponce as Dulce
- Austin Woods as Nathan Jonze

== Episodes ==
No.	Title	Directed by	Written by	Original release date
1	"Revenge"	Alethea Jones	Bill Dubuque	May 7, 2026
2	"Orphans"	Alethea Jones	Karen Campbell	May 7, 2026
3	"American Immigrant"	Gwyneth Horder-Payton	Debra Moore Muñoz and David Paul Francis	May 7, 2026
4	"Can't Hardly Carlito"	Mairzee Almas	Felicia Hilario	May 7, 2026
5	"Fault Lines"	Mairzee Almas	Jeff Augustin	May 7, 2026
6	"Original Sin"	Ben Semanoff	Christina Piña	May 7, 2026
7	"Hammer Drop"	Ben Semanoff	David Paul Francis and Felicia Hilario	May 7, 2026
8	"Heart Matters"	John Dahl	Debra Moore Muñoz and Jeff Augustin	May 7, 2026
9	"Aperture"	John Dahl	Karen Campbell	May 7, 2026

== Production ==
=== Development ===
Peacock gave the series order on August 22, 2024. Dubuque is credited as creator and executive producer; Karen Campbell, whose earlier credits include Dexter and Outlander, serves as showrunner and executive producer alongside him. Alethea Jones and Stefano Sollima are also executive producers. Jones directed the first two episodes; Gwyneth Horder-Payton, Marizee Almas, Ben Semanoff, and John Dahl directed the rest. MRC is the studio, with Paramount Global Content Distribution handling international sales.

In an interview with Screen Rant before the premiere, Dubuque and Campbell stated that they had plans for further seasons. However, on September 12, 2026, Peacock canceled the series after one season.

=== Casting ===
Shannon Gisela was cast as Etta in 2024; M.I.A. is her first leading role. In March 2025 Deadline reported that Maurice Compte, Danay Garcia and Cary Elwes had joined her in the principal cast. Brittany Adebumola, Dylan Jackson, Alberto Guerra, Gerardo Celasco and Marta Milans were announced later, along with a guest lineup that included Edward James Olmos and Sonia Braga. Rich Delia and Nicole Bruno served as the casting directors.

=== Filming ===
Filming took place in South Florida — mostly Miami-Dade County and the Florida Keys — with interiors shot at the EUE/Screen Gems facility in Miami. The on-location shoot was unusual for the genre: many earlier Miami-set crime dramas, including Griselda and Dexter, filmed elsewhere using Miami stand-ins.

== Release ==
The nine-episode series premiered on Peacock on May 7, 2026. NBC aired the pilot episode on May 14 at 10:00 p.m. ET/PT. Outside the United States, the series was released on Paramount+.

== Reception ==
=== Critical response ===
On the review aggregation website Rotten Tomatoes, the series holds an approval rating of 62% based on 13 reviews. On Metacritic, which uses a weighted average, the series received a score 59 out of 100 based on 7 critic reviews, indicating "mixed or average" reviews.

Daniel Fienberg of The Hollywood Reporter was lukewarm, calling the show disposable but watchable and noting that the middle of the season drags. Variety likened the tone to a telenovela and described the plot as engaging but preposterous. Jessica Toomer of Collider was more positive, praising Gisela's performance and the use of real Miami locations. A dissenting view came from JoBlo's Alex Maidy, who wrote that "M.I.A. is D.O.A."

=== Viewership ===
Per FlixPatrol, M.I.A. debuted at No. 1 on Peacock in the United States. On Paramount+ it reached No. 3 worldwide during its premiere week, behind Yellowstone and Tulsa King.
