= The Dice House =

The Dice House is a black comedy by Paul Lucas, first staged in June 2001 at the Belgrade Theatre in Coventry. Inspired by Luke Rhinehart's The Dice Man, it explores the nature and limitations of free will.

== Synopsis ==
Dr Drabble, a psychiatrist, blackmails one of his recently cured patients — the naif, Matthew — to kidnap his wife from the Dice House, where she is undergoing therapy. He explains that she has been brainwashed by a second psychiatrist, Dr/ Ratner, into pursuing 'Dice Therapy', a process by which patients are encouraged to make all decisions based on the whim of dice.

The plot is then sidelined to make way for a series of comic skits, based around the amusing activities of the residents of the Dice House: pubic shaving, cross dressing, car theft, murder and one man's battle against the Slow Assassins. Dr Drabble's ill-considered scheme thus plays out as farce in the background, as it becomes transparent he is more insane than his wife.

In a dramatic climax, the fate of both doctors is determined by a single roll of the dice.

== Performance history ==
The Dice House premiered in June 2001 at the Belgrade Theatre in Coventry, transferred to the Islington Theatre in March the same year and was partially rewritten for the Edinburgh Drama Festival in August 2002. Its first performance in London's West End was at the Arts Theatre in 2004, and the play has subsequently been performed by the New Stages Theatre Club in Wandsworth in July 2005 and at Islington's Hen & Chickens Theatre in January 2009. and at Hereford's Courtyard Theatre by Inflight Theatre Company in 2012. Performances have also been reported in the USA, Norway and Estonia.
