= Bill Dubuque =

American screenwriter

- Born: St. Louis, Missouri, U.S.
- Occupation: Screenwriter

Bill Dubuque is an American screenwriter known for such films as The Accountant, A Family Man, The Judge, and the television series Ozark.

== Biography ==
Dubuque was born in St. Louis, Missouri, spending time working on the Lake of the Ozarks as a teen. He still lives in St. Louis, with his wife and three children, with whom he still frequently visits the Lake of the Ozarks.

Before starting as a screenwriter in 2008, Dubuque worked as a recruitment headhunter. He was approached by producer Mark Williams with the rough idea for The Accountant, which Dubuque developed into a script named to the 2011 Black List of the best unproduced screenplays in Hollywood, including doing research to develop the protagonist (played by Ben Affleck) to have high-functioning autism; the film was credited by Autism Speaks for its portrayal of the disorder. The first screenplay of his to be produced, 2012's The Judge, led to Dubuque's being recognized as one of Variety's 10 screenwriters to watch and named to the 2012 Black List with 20 mentions. In 2015, Dubuque successfully pitched an action-adventure called The Real McCoy to Universal Pictures, with Chris Pratt attached to star; as of January 2018, the film was still in development.

Another collaboration with Mark Williams, A Family Man, was released in 2016; with a working title of The Headhunter's Calling, the script was based on Dubuque's previous work in recruitment.

Dubuque's teenage experiences at an Ozarks resort led him to work again with producer Mark Williams and Jason Bateman on developing the series Ozark, which was released on Netflix in 2017 and quickly renewed for a second season, as well as earning the writing team a Writers Guild of America Award nomination. In April 2019, it was revealed that Dubuque had replaced Damian Szifron as the screenwriter for the film adaptation of The Six Million Dollar Man.

In 2024, it was announced that he would wrote and executive produce the Netflix limited series His & Hers., which premiered on January 8, 2026. In the same year, Peacock gave the series order of M.I.A. which he serves as a creator, writer and executive producer. The series premiered on May 7, 2026.

== Filmography ==
=== Film ===
Year	Title	Writer	Executive producer	Ref
2014	The Judge	Yes	No	
2016	A Family Man	Yes	Yes	
2016	The Accountant	Yes	No	
2025	The Accountant 2	Yes	No	
TBA	Running	Yes	No	

=== Television ===
Year	Title	Creator	Writer	Executive producer	Ref
2017–2022	Ozark	Yes	Yes	Yes	
2026	His & Hers	No	Yes	Yes	
2026	M.I.A.	Yes	Yes	Yes	
TBA	The Spread	Yes	Yes	Yes	

== Awards and nominations ==
Primetime Emmy Awards
Year	Category	Work	Result	Ref
2019	Outstanding Drama Series	Ozark	Nominated	
2020	Outstanding Drama Series	Ozark	Nominated	
2022	Outstanding Drama Series	Ozark	Nominated	

Writers Guild of America Awards
Year	Category	Work	Result	Ref
2018	New Series	Ozark	Nominated	
2020	Dramatic Series	Ozark	Nominated	

Producers Guild of America Awards
Year	Category	Work	Result	Ref
2019	Best Episodic Drama	Ozark	Nominated	
2021	Best Episodic Drama	Ozark	Nominated	

Others
Year	Award	Category	Work	Result	Ref
2008	PAGE International Screenwriting Awards	Best Drama Script	A Family Man	Gold Prize	
2017	Georgia Film Critics Association Awards	Oglethorpe Award for Excellence in Georgia Cinema	The Accountant	Nominated	
2025	South by Southwest	Audience Awards	The Accountant 2	Won	
