= Miel Bredouw =

American podcaster, comedian, singer

- Born: Mariel Wade Bredouw; July 11, 1989 (age 37); Los Angeles, California, U.S.
- Other name: Mielmonster
- Occupations: Comedian, podcaster, musician
- Years active: 2014–2020, 2023
- Relatives: Mree (sister-in-law)

Mariel Wade "Miel" Bredouw (/miˈɛl ˈbreɪdoʊ/ mee-EL BRAY-doh, born July 11, 1989) is an American former comedian, podcaster, and musician. Initially gaining fame on Vine in 2014, she also hosted the HeadGum podcast Punch Up the Jam from 2017 to 2020. She released her debut album, Tourist Season, in 2020.

== Early life ==
Mariel Wade Bredouw was born in Los Angeles on July 11, 1989. Her father, Jim, is a studio musician who has worked on music for Nike campaigns. She has a younger brother named Henri, a musician who is married to musician Mree, and a younger sister named Minnie, a design lecturer at California College of the Arts. She spent her childhood on Orcas Island, Washington. When she was 19, she moved back to Los Angeles to pursue a music career, and became involved with the Upright Citizens Brigade.

== Career ==
In 2014, while working as a sous-chef for a restaurant in Echo Park, Bredouw began posting comedic videos on Vine under the username Mielmonster. Over the next two years, she became one of the most popular creators on the platform, and was featured in Camp Unplug, a series produced by the platform. By the time the platform closed in 2016, her videos had been looped more than 328 million times, and her account had over 370,000 followers. Following Vine's demise, Bredouw began posting videos on YouTube.

In 2017, Bredouw began hosting the HeadGum podcast Punch Up the Jam alongside comedian Demi Adejuyigbe. The podcast involves discussing a popular song with a celebrity guest and creating a parody (or "punch up") of the song, typically a comedic take that addresses the song's weaker points. In 2018, the podcast was named one of the best of the year by The A.V. Club. Adejuyigbe left the podcast in late 2019 (though he returned for a one-off appearance in November 2020) and Bredouw continued as its stand-alone host, reformatting the show slightly to allow for discussed songs to be "unpunchable" and including contributions from musician Rob Moose. During COVID-19 lockdowns in New York City, comedian Chris Fleming joined the podcast as a temporary co-host. In addition to working on Punch Up the Jam, Bredouw has produced comedy for Funny or Die, Super Deluxe, HBO, and BuzzFeed, and makes regular appearances on comedian Ian Karmel's All Fantasy Everything podcast.

In 2019, a short video Bredouw had created in 2016 which featured her singing the lyrics to Three 6 Mafia's song "Slob on My Knob" to the tune of "Carol of the Bells" was posted by pop culture blog Barstool Sports without crediting her. After she lodged a DMCA claim, Barstool Sports offered her a $50 gift card to retract it. After she did not respond to further offers, including one for $2,000, as well as hundreds of messages from Barstool Sports-related accounts, the company filed a counter-notice which would force her to take legal action if she wanted the company to stop using her videos. After widespread condemnation for its actions, Barstool Sports removed all of Bredouw's content from its accounts, as well as deleting over 60,000 posts from its Twitter account and over 1,000 posts from its Instagram account.

Bredouw debuted as a musician in 2020, releasing her singles "Must Be Fine" and "I'll Be Holding" in July. These were followed by her debut album Tourist Season, which was produced by her brother Henri. The album was created over a month and a half during mid-2019 in her parents' barn. The seven tracks on the album each represent a different emotion associated with the break-up of a relationship.

Following the album's release, Bredouw took an extended hiatus. She returned in early 2023, and released the single "Call You Out" on April 20. By the end of the year, however, Bredouw had again exited public life. Her only remaining online presence as of May 2025 is her Patreon account, on which she delivers monthly playlists dubbed "Made You A Mixtape" to her backers.

== Personal life ==
In September 2017, Bredouw and Smosh co-founder Anthony Padilla confirmed that they were dating. Bredouw is a vegan and operated a vegan bakery when she lived in Los Angeles.

== Discography ==
=== Studio albums ===
Title	Album details
Tourist Season	Released: July 22, 2020; Label: Miel Music Publishing; Format: Digital download, online streaming

=== Singles ===
List of singles, showing year released and album name
Title	Year	Album
"Must Be Fine"	2020	Tourist Season
"I'll Be Holding"	2020	Tourist Season
"Call You Out"	2023	Non-album single

=== Guest appearances ===
Title	Year	Other artists	Album
Additional vocals (all songs)	2013	Henri Bardot	Tunnels
"Leaving"	2015	Pax	Leaving
"Figurine"	2016	Henri Bardot	Blue Night

== Filmography ==
Television
Year	Title	Role	Notes
2015	EastSiders	Waitress	2 episodes
2015	Camp Unplug	Mielmonster	Main cast
