= Punch Up the Jam =

Music podcast

- Punch Up the Jam cover art, 2017-2020
- Genre: Music, Comedy
- Language: English

Cast and voices
- Hosted by: Miel Bredouw (2017-2020); Demi Adejuyigbe (2017–2019); Andrew Gregory (2021-2022); Evan Gregory (2021-2022)

Production
- Length: 60–90 minutes

Publication
- No. of episodes: 192
- Original release: December 13, 2017 – December 22, 2022 (5 years)
- Provider: Headgum
- Updates: Weekly

Related
- Website: headgum.com/punch-up-the-jam

Punch Up the Jam was a music and comedy podcast created by Miel Bredouw and Demi Adejuyigbe in 2017. It was later hosted by Bredouw with a variety of intermittent co-hosts including Chris Fleming and Rob Moose. After Bredouw's departure, it was revived by the podcasting network Headgum with hosts Andrew and Evan Gregory. Their last episode aired in 2022. The podcast discussed popular singles, including their production, instrumentation, vocals, and lyrics, and often ended episodes with a "punched up" version in which some element of the song was rewritten in a comedic way.

Most podcast episodes featured a comedic guest, including notable comedians such as Ayo Edebiri, Chris Fleming, Adam Conover, Amir Blumenfeld, Jake Hurwitz, Nicole Byer, Weird Al Yankovic, Negin Farsad and others. Bredouw and Adejuyigbe also performed multiple live shows across the United States.

== Format ==
The show's theme music is a mash-up of "Pump Up the Jam" by Technotronic and "You Can Call Me Al" by Paul Simon.

Episodes begin with an enthusiastic introduction of the comedic guest. Together with the guest, the hosts then discuss one popular single for the entirety of the episode. The discussion often begins with some discussion of the song's history and trivia regarding its writing and production. The hosts then walk through the song section by section, often clipping just a verse, chorus, or bridge, discussing and critiquing the instrumentation, vocals, and lyrics. After discussing the entire song, almost every episode includes a "punched-up" version in which a host produces a parody that changes the original song's music or lyrics in a comedic way. Some songs, however, are praised as "unpunchable" and thus no punch-up is aired. Finally, each interview ends with the hosts and guest offering their own "unpunchable jam" of the week as music recommendations. These were curated into a Spotify playlist by Adejuyigbe from 2017 through 2019. (Note: See § External links.)

Bredouw and Adejuyigbe recorded multiple episodes live, including episode 15 in Austin, Texas ("Mambo No. 5"), episode 54 at PodCon in Seattle ("Send Me On My Way" with Griffin McElroy), episode 80 in Los Angeles ("Two Princes" with Jon Gabrus and Alice Wetterlund), episode 86 in Seattle ("Santeria" with Ian Karmel), and episode 87 in Portland, Oregon ("Ghostbusters" with Open Mike Eagle and Neil Cicierega).

== History ==
Cover art for the podcast, 2021-2022

Punch Up the Jam was produced by the Headgum network. The first episode aired on December 13, 2017, and the podcast was originally hosted by both Bredouw and Adejuyigbe. On the 77th episode, on July 4, 2019, Adejuyigbe announced that he would no longer be involved with the show.

Beginning with episode 91, Bredouw continued the show as its sole host. Throughout the COVID-19 lockdown in 2020, Bredouw often co-hosted the show with Chris Fleming. The podcast was also expanded to feature commentary from musician and music theorist Rob Moose, which was referred to as the show's "weatherman" segment. The final episode of the show with Bredouw hosting was posted on December 24, 2020.

A year later in December 2021, the podcast format was revived by Headgum with Andrew and Evan Gregory of the Gregory Brothers as hosts. The Gregorys hosted the show until December 22, 2022, when the show was again retired.

== Reception ==
Punch Up the Jam has received praise from numerous outlets, including Lifehacker,, The Oregonian,, Metro Vulture, Time, and Pitchfork. It was included in annual "Best of" lists by the Comedy Bureau and Buzzfeed in 2018, Time and Vulture in 2019, and Popsugar in 2023. Writing in 2019, Mark Kramer with Vulture praised the show, saying "Bredouw and Adejuyigbe put more work into each episode than some podcast hosts do in a season, pulling out individual tracks, researching the artist, and creating the Punch Up from scratch".

In 2020, Punch Up the Jam won the award for "Best Podcast Created and/or Hosted by a Woman" from Discover Pods. In 2022, the podcast was nominated for "Best Music Podcast" in the People's Choice Podcast Awards

== Episode list ==
=== Bredouw & Adejuyigbe ===
Episode	Title	Guest	Original release date
1	Welcome to Punch Up the Jam!	—	December 13, 2017
2	"Little Drummer Boy" by Jack Halloran Singers	—	December 21, 2017
3	"I Saw Mommy Kissing Santa Claus" by Jimmy Boyd	—	December 21, 2017
4	"Auld Lang Syne"	—	December 28, 2017
5	"You Make My Dreams" by Hall & Oates	—	January 4, 2018
6	"Crash into Me" by Dave Matthews	—	January 11, 2018
7	"Jessie's Girl" by Rick Springfield	Shelby Fero	January 18, 2018
8	"Whenever, Wherever" by Shakira	Solomon Georgio	January 25, 2018
9	"Freak on a Leash" by Korn	Sean Jordan	February 1, 2018
10	"Your Song" by Elton John	Jake Hurwitz and Amir Blumenfeld	February 8, 2018
11	"Welcome to the Jungle" by Guns N' Roses	Grace Helbig	February 15, 2018
12	"Absolutely (Story of a Girl)" by Nine Days	Jill Gutowitz	February 22, 2018
13	"What's Your Fantasy" by Ludacris	—	March 1, 2018
14	"Party in the U.S.A." by Miley Cyrus	—	March 8, 2018
15	"Friday I'm in Love" by The Cure	—	March 15, 2018
16	"Mambo No. 5" by Lou Bega	—	March 22, 2018
17	"Escape (The Piña Colada Song)" by Rupert Holmes	Ian Karmel and Sean Jordan	March 29, 2018
18	"Semi-Charmed Life" by Third Eye Blind	Mara Wilson	April 5, 2018
19	"In the Air Tonight" by Phil Collins	—	April 12, 2018
20	"The Look" by Roxette	—	April 19, 2018
21	"Mr. Brightside" by The Killers	Biniam Bizuneh	April 26, 2018
22	"Fat Lip" by Sum 41	Whitmer Thomas	May 3, 2018
23	"Hey Ma" by Cam'ron feat. Juelz Santana	David Gborie	May 10, 2018
24	"Short People" by Randy Newman	—	May 17, 2018
25	"Pour Some Sugar on Me" by Def Leppard	Erin Whitehead	May 24, 2018
26	"One Week" by Barenaked Ladies	Anthony Troli	May 31, 2018
27	"It Wasn't Me" by Shaggy	Ify Nwadiwe	June 7, 2018
28	"What a Fool Believes" by The Doobie Brothers	Miel's Dad	June 14, 2018
29	"Summer Girls" by LFO	Hannah Pilkes	June 21, 2018
30	"The Star-Spangled Banner" by America	—	June 28, 2018
31	"Teenage Dirtbag" by Wheatus	Dylan Gelula	July 5, 2018
32	"Somebody's Watching Me" by Rockwell	Mary Kobayashi	July 12, 2018
33	"I Don't Mind" by Usher	Eliza Skinner	July 19, 2018
34	"Bust a Move" by Young MC	Hrishikesh Hirway	July 26, 2018
35	"Nookie" by Limp Bizkit	Jamie Loftus	August 2, 2018
36	"A Thousand Miles" by Vanessa Carlton	Jon Cozart	August 9, 2018
37	"Baby Got Back" by Sir Mix-a-Lot	Andrew Ti	August 16, 2018
38	"Cowboy Take Me Away" by Dixie Chicks	Christine Sydelko	August 23, 2018
39	"L.A. Woman" by The Doors	Paul F. Tompkins	August 30, 2018
40	BONUS EPISODE: Q's AND A's!	—	September 13, 2018
41	"Misery Business" by Paramore	—	October 4, 2018
42	"Kokomo" by The Beach Boys	Jon Gabrus	October 11, 2018
43	"That's the Way It Is" by Celine Dion	Eliot Glazer	October 18, 2018
44	"Monster Mash" by Bobby Pickett	—	October 25, 2018
45	"Freek-A-Leek" by Petey Pablo	Dani Fernandez	November 1, 2018
46	"Regulate" by Warren G and Nate Dogg	Chris Cubas	November 8, 2018
47	"Daughters" by John Mayer	Nick Kocher	November 15, 2018
48	"Too Close" by Next	Horny Ben	November 22, 2018
49	"Wannabe" by Spice Girls	Grace Spelman	November 29, 2018
50	"I Write Sins Not Tragedies" by Panic! At The Disco	—	December 6, 2018
51	"I Wish" by Skee-Lo	Mike Schubert	December 13, 2018
52	"Last Christmas" by Wham!	Kevin Porter and Anthony Troli	December 20, 2018
53	BONUS EPISODE: Our Favorite TV Theme Songs (from Patreon)	—	December 26, 2018
54	A Year in Review (feat. The Most Ambitious Punch-Up Yet)	—	January 3, 2019
55	"You Oughta Know" by Alanis Morissette	Jake Weisman	January 10, 2019
56	"Dirty Work" by Steely Dan	Tawny Newsome	January 17, 2019
57	"Send Me on My Way" by Rusted Root	Griffin McElroy	January 24, 2019
58	"Good Riddance (Time of Your Life)" by Green Day	Jocey Coffman	January 31, 2019
59	"Come on Eileen" by Dexys Midnight Runners	Griffin Newman	February 7, 2019
60	"Love Shack" by The B-52's	Amy Miller	February 14, 2019
61	"MMMBop" by Hanson	Broti Gupta	February 21, 2019
62	"Africa" by Toto	Zach Reino and Jessica McKenna	February 28, 2019
63	"There Is a Light That Never Goes Out" by The Smiths	Sean O'Connor	March 7, 2019
64	"Drops of Jupiter" by Train	Edgar Momplaisir	March 14, 2019
65	"Sk8er Boi" by Avril Lavigne	Kyle Ayers	March 21, 2019
66	"Take On Me" by A-ha	LaToya Ferguson	March 28, 2019
67	"That Don't Impress Me Much" by Shania Twain	Caitlin Durante	April 4, 2019
68	"Old Town Road" by Lil Nas X	—	April 11, 2019
69	"Only Time" by Enya	Ross Kimball	April 18, 2019
70	"Everytime We Touch" by Cascada	Dan Telfer	April 25, 2019
71	"Space Jam" by Quad City DJ's	Ben Mekler	May 2, 2019
72	"Pony" by Ginuwine	Kevin Porter	May 9, 2019
73	"I'm Yours" by Jason Mraz	Jacquis Neal	May 16, 2019
74	"Jolene" by Dolly Parton	Fiona Landers	May 23, 2019
75	"My Sharona" by The Knack	Adam Conover	May 30, 2019
76	"London Bridge" by Fergie	Ben Siemon	June 6, 2019
77	"Believe" by Cher	Nicole Byer	June 13, 2019
78	"Feel Good Inc." by Gorillaz	Julia Nunes	June 20, 2019
79	"Walking in Memphis" by Marc Cohn	Jesse David Fox	June 27, 2019
80	"Kiss from a Rose" by Seal	Travis McElroy	July 4, 2019
81	"Poison" by Bell Biv DeVoe	Matt Belknap	July 11, 2019
82	"You Get What You Give" by New Radicals	Hayes Davenport	July 18, 2019
83	"Two Princes" by Spin Doctors	Jon Gabrus and Alice Wetterlund	July 25, 2019
84	"I Don't Want to Be" by Gavin DeGraw	Carl Tart	August 1, 2019
85	"Shallow" from A Star is Born by Lady Gaga and Bradley Cooper	Sean Clements	August 8, 2019
86	"The Boy is Mine" by Brandy & Monica	Naomi Ekperigin and Andy Beckerman	August 15, 2019
87	"Hotel California" by The Eagles (Part 1)	Miel's Dad	August 22, 2019
88	"Hotel California" by The Eagles (Part 2)	Miel's Dad	August 29, 2019
89	"Santeria" by Sublime	Ian Karmel	September 5, 2019
90	"Ghostbusters" by Ray Parker Jr.	Open Mike Eagle and Neil Cicierega	September 12, 2019

=== Bredouw ===
Episode	Song	Guest	Original release date
91	"Intergalactic" by Beastie Boys	Josh Gondelman	October 3, 2019
92	"Cute Without the 'E' (Cut from the Team)" by Taking Back Sunday	Natalie Walker	October 10, 2019
93	"The Call" by Backstreet Boys	Brian David Gilbert	October 17, 2019
94	"Celebration" by Kool & The Gang	Gabriel Gundacker	October 24, 2019
95	"Sex and Candy" by Marcy Playground	Shane Torres	October 31, 2019
96	"Gloria" by Laura Branigan	Lindsey Weber	November 7, 2019
97	"The Way" by Fastball	Heath Saunders	November 14, 2019
98	"Steal My Sunshine" by Len	Griffin Newman	November 21, 2019
99	"Vindicated" by Dashboard Confessional	Karen Han	November 28, 2019
100	"Get Outta My Dreams, Get into My Car" by Billy Ocean	Joe Kwaczala	December 5, 2019
101	"Hook" by Blues Traveler	Amir Blumenfeld	December 12, 2019
102	"Black Hole Sun" by Soundgarden	Rob Moose	December 19, 2019
103	"Chop Suey!" by System Of A Down	Henri Bardot	January 2, 2020
104	"Mmm Mmm Mmm Mmm" by Crash Test Dummies	Ayo Edebiri	January 9, 2020
105	"Promiscuous" by Nelly Furtado ft. Timbaland	Bettina Campomanes	January 16, 2020
106	"Lucky" by Britney Spears	Chris Murphy	January 23, 2020
107	"Liquid Dreams" by O-Town	David Sims	January 30, 2020
108	"Material Girl" by Madonna	Naomi Fry	February 6, 2020
109	"Bette Davis Eyes" by Kim Carnes	Andy Haynes	February 13, 2020
110	"I'd Do Anything for Love (But I Won't Do That)" by Meat Loaf	Chris Fleming	February 20, 2020
111	"Hey Jealousy" by Gin Blossoms	Patrick Walsh	February 27, 2020
112	"Dancing in the Dark" by Bruce Springsteen	Kevin T. Porter	March 12, 2020
113	"Loser" by Beck	Taylor Garron	March 19, 2020
114	PLAYLIST: Songs You Need Six Feet Of Room To Dance To	—	March 26, 2020
115	"Head Over Heels" by Tears for Fears	Haley Blais	April 2, 2020
116	"Smooth" by Santana	Andrew Michaan	April 9, 2020
117	"I Want You" by Savage Garden	Chris Fleming	April 16, 2020
118	"Sugar, We're Goin Down" by Fall Out Boy	Chris Fleming	April 23, 2020
119	"What's Up?" by 4 Non Blondes	Chris Fleming	April 30, 2020
120	MIXTAPE: Steamy and Dreamy	—	May 7, 2020
121	"Hungry Like the Wolf" by Duran Duran	Chris Fleming	May 14, 2020
122	"Iris" by Goo Goo Dolls	Chris Fleming	May 21, 2020
123	"I 2 I" from A Goofy Movie	Chris Fleming	May 28, 2020
124	A Very Special Mielbag	Marissa Melnyk	June 18, 2020
125	"I Wanna Dance With Somebody" by Whitney Houston	David Gborie	July 2, 2020
126	"Heartbeats" by The Knife	Ann Friedman and Aminatou Sow	July 9, 2020
127	"Somebody That I Used to Know" by Gotye	Chris Fleming	July 23, 2020
128	"The Sweet Escape" by Gwen Stefani	Akilah Hughes	August 6, 2020
129	"Running Up That Hill" by Kate Bush	Chris Fleming	August 20, 2020
130	"Mr. Jones" by Counting Crows	Chris Fleming	September 3, 2020
131	Unpunchable Party Playlists	Chris Fleming	September 17, 2020
132	"Time After Time" by Cyndi Lauper	Chris Fleming	October 1, 2020
133	"Like a Prayer" by Madonna	Brian David Gilbert	October 15, 2020
134	"Enter Sandman" by Metallica	Henri Bardot	October 29, 2020
135	Introducing: 'Dirt Cheap'	—	November 10, 2020
136	"The Anthem" by Good Charlotte	Chris Fleming	November 12, 2020
137	"Beverly Hills" by Weezer	Demi Adejuyigbe	November 26, 2020
138	"Always Be My Baby" by Mariah Carey	Rob Moose	December 10, 2020
139	"Fast Car" by Tracy Chapman	Chris Fleming	December 24, 2020
140	Introducing: 'Fake the Nation'	—	August 19, 2021

=== Gregory Brothers ===
Episode	Song	Guest	Original release date
141	Punch Up The Jam - Trailer	—	December 8, 2021
142	"Wonderful Christmastime" by Paul McCartney	Weird Al Yankovic	December 16, 2021
143	"Do They Know It's Christmas?" by Band Aid	—	December 23, 2021
144	"Feel Like Makin' Love" by Bad Company	—	December 30, 2021
145	"Because of You" by Kelly Clarkson	Akilah Hughes	January 6, 2022
146	"Deja Vu" by Olivia Rodrigo	Tim Daniels and Tom Reynolds	January 20, 2022
147	"Conga" by Miami Sound Machine	Jiji Lee	January 27, 2022
148	"Brass Monkey" by Beastie Boys	Amir Blumenfeld	February 3, 2022
149	"I Won't Back Down" by Tom Petty	Kristen Bartlett and Jason Gore	February 10, 2022
150	"The Gambler" by Kenny Rogers	—	February 17, 2022
151	"Flavor of the Weak" by American Hi-Fi	Jake Hurwitz	February 24, 2022
152	"Upside Down" by Diana Ross	Gaby Dunn	March 3, 2022
153	"5 Years" by Björk	Negin Farsad	March 10, 2022
154	"Sexy Bitch" by David Guetta ft. Akon	Justin Richmond	March 17, 2022
155	"I Want It That Way" by Backstreet Boys	Jack Douglass and Erin Breslin	March 24, 2022
156	"Como Me Quieres" by Khruangbin	—	March 31, 2022
157	"The Reason" by Hoobastank	Mano Agapion	April 14, 2022
158	"Manic Monday" by The Bangles	—	April 21, 2022
159	"Levitating" by Dua Lipa	Connor Ratliff	April 28, 2022
160	"Dust in the Wind" by Kansas	—	May 5, 2022
161	"With Arms Wide Open" by Creed	Markiplier	May 12, 2022
162	"Bring Me To Life" by Evanescence	Michael Gregory	May 19, 2022
163	"I Get Around" by The Beach Boys	Tim Daniels	May 26, 2022
164	"Beggin" by Måneskin	Daniel Thrasher	June 2, 2022
165	"Mr. Blue Sky" by ELO	Amy Miller	June 9, 2022
166	"Frontin" by Pharrell	Negin Farsad	June 16, 2022
167	"I'm Not Okay (I Promise)" by My Chemical Romance	Gianmarco Soresi	June 23, 2022
168	"Imagine" by John Lennon	Arthur Meyer	June 30, 2022
169	"We Built This City" by Starship	—	July 14, 2022
170	"Barbie Girl" by Aqua	Sammy Smart and Emily Gonzalez of Too Scary; Didn't Watch	July 21, 2022
171	"I Need To Know" by Marc Anthony	Rachel Green and Kirsten O’Brien of Boss Bitches	July 28, 2022
172	"I'll Make Love To You" by Boyz II Men	Carl Tart	August 4, 2022
173	"Never Gonna Give You Up" by Rick Astley	—	August 11, 2022
174	"Brandy (You're a Fine Girl)" by Looking Glass	Jon Gabrus	August 18, 2022
175	"Thinking Out Loud" by Ed Sheeran	—	August 25, 2022
176	"Everytime We Touch" by Cascada	Annie Rauwerda aka Depths of Wikipedia	September 1, 2022
177	"The Lazy Song" by Bruno Mars	Shelby Wolstein and EJ Marcus	September 8, 2022
178	"Shine" by Collective Soul	—	September 15, 2022
179	"Octopus's Garden" by The Beatles	Reilly Anspaugh	September 22, 2022
180	"Rude" by MAGIC!	Wolves of Glendale	September 29, 2022
181	"Goodbye Earl" by The Chicks	—	October 6, 2022
182	"Young Americans" by David Bowie	Julian Shapiro-Barnum	October 13, 2022
183	"Lovely Day" by Bill Withers	Michael Gregory	October 20, 2022
184	"Replay" by Iyaz	Phil Jamesson	October 27, 2022
185	"Eye of The Tiger" by Survivor	Arthur Meyer	November 3, 2022
186	"Boulevard of Broken Dreams" by Green Day	Joanna Hausmann	November 10, 2022
187	"You're Still The One" by Shania Twain	Jiji Lee	November 17, 2022
188	"A Long December" by Counting Crows	Pat Cassels	December 1, 2022
189	"One Headlight" by The Wallflowers	—	December 8, 2022
190	"Sugar" by Maroon 5	Ena Da	December 15, 2022
191	"Y.M.C.A." by Village People	—	December 22, 2022
192	Introducing: Wayne Brady's What If?! with Jonathan Mangum	—	March 20, 2025

== See also ==
- Headgum
- List of music podcasts
