= Asheville Tourists =

- Founded in 1897; Asheville, North Carolina
Team logo
Cap insignia

Minor league affiliations
- Class: High-A (2021–present)
- Previous classes: Class A (1976–2020); Double-A (1968–1975); Class A (1967); Double-A (1963–1966); Class A (1959–1962); Class B (1932, 1934–1942, 1946–1955); Class C (1931); Class B (1924–1930); Class D (1910–1917)
- League: South Atlantic League (1980–present)
- Division: South Division
- Previous leagues: Western Carolinas League (1976–1979); Southern League (1972–1975); Dixie Association (1971); Southern League (1968–1970); Carolina League (1967); Southern League (1964–1966); South Atlantic League (1959–1963); Tri-State League (1946–1955); Piedmont League (1931–1932, 1934–1942); South Atlantic League (1924–1930); North Carolina State League (1913–1917); Appalachian League (1911–1912); Southeastern League (1897, 1910)

Major league affiliations
- Team: Houston Astros (1967, 1982–1993, 2021–present); Colorado Rockies (1994–2020); Texas Rangers (1976–1981); Baltimore Orioles (1972–1975); Chicago White Sox (1971); Cincinnati Reds (1968–1970); Pittsburgh Pirates (1961–1966); Philadelphia Phillies (1959–1960); Brooklyn Dodgers (1946–1951, 1953–1955); St. Louis Cardinals (1935–42); Boston Red Sox (1934)

Minor league titles
- League titles (7): 1915; 1939; 1961; 1968; 1984; 2012; 2014

Team data
- Name: Asheville Tourists (1976–present); Asheville Orioles (1972–1975); Asheville Tourists (1916–1971); Asheville Mountaineers (1913–1915); Asheville Moonshiners (1897, 1910–1912)
- Colors: Blue Ridge blue, midnight navy, Biltmore jade
- Mascots: Ted E. Tourist and Mr. Moon
- Ballpark: HomeTrust Park (1924–present)
- Owner/ Operator: Mike DeWine and family
- General manager: Larry Hawkins
- Manager: Nate Shaver
- Website: milb.com/asheville

The Asheville Tourists are a Minor League Baseball team based in Asheville, North Carolina. They are members of the South Atlantic League and are the High-A affiliate of the Houston Astros.

Asheville teams have played under the Tourists moniker in different leagues and classifications for over a century, with the earliest dating to 1897. The current team has played continuously in what is now known as the South Atlantic League since 1976, though it was briefly known as the High-A East in 2021. Asheville has won three South Atlantic league championships, first in 1984 and most recently in 2014. Previous Tourists teams won a total of four additional championships.

The Tourists play home games at HomeTrust Park. The stadium opened in 1924, renovated in 1959, 1992, and again now through the 2026 season. It seats 4,000 fans.

== History ==
=== Earlier teams ===
Professional baseball in Asheville, North Carolina, dates to 1897, when the Asheville Moonshiners took the field. It has been played continuously for nearly every year since 1909, with early teams such as the Redbirds (1909) and the Mountaineers (1910–1914). The "Tourists" name dates to 1915, when local sportswriters began referring to the Mountaineers team as the Tourists.

The original Tourists brought Asheville its first ever professional sports championship in 1915. It continued playing in the Class-D North Carolina State League until 1917, when the league suspended operations due to World War I. In 1924 the "Asheville Skylanders" started play in the South Atlantic League; however, it soon adopted the Tourists nickname. It played in the South Atlantic League until 1930, when it jumped to the Piedmont League, where it played for two seasons before folding. In 1934 the Columbia Sandlappers moved to Asheville, taking up the Tourists name. This incarnation won the 1939 Piedmont League championship; however the league suspended operations in 1942, due to the outset of World War II.

In 1946 a new Tourists franchise started up in the Tri-State League. During the 1940s the team shared McCormick Field with the Asheville Blues, an independent Negro leagues team. It folded along with its league in 1955. In 1959 a new South Atlantic League (later the Southern League) franchise came to town. McCormick Field was renovated. The team initially wanted a new name, and organized a fan vote to pick. However, fans voted overwhelmingly to keep the Tourists nickname. The team won two league titles, in 1961 and 1968. In 1968, the Tourists won the Southern League championship under manager Sparky Anderson, who went on to manage the Cincinnati Reds and Detroit Tigers during his 26 years in Major League Baseball.

In 1972 Asheville became affiliated with the Baltimore Orioles MLB team. As part of Baltimore's "Oriole Way" system, the Asheville team was rebranded the Asheville Orioles, adopting the logo and colors of its affiliate. The team had four successive winning seasons, but after the 1975 season the Orioles relocated its Double-A franchise to Charlotte, North Carolina, as the Charlotte Orioles.

=== Current team ===
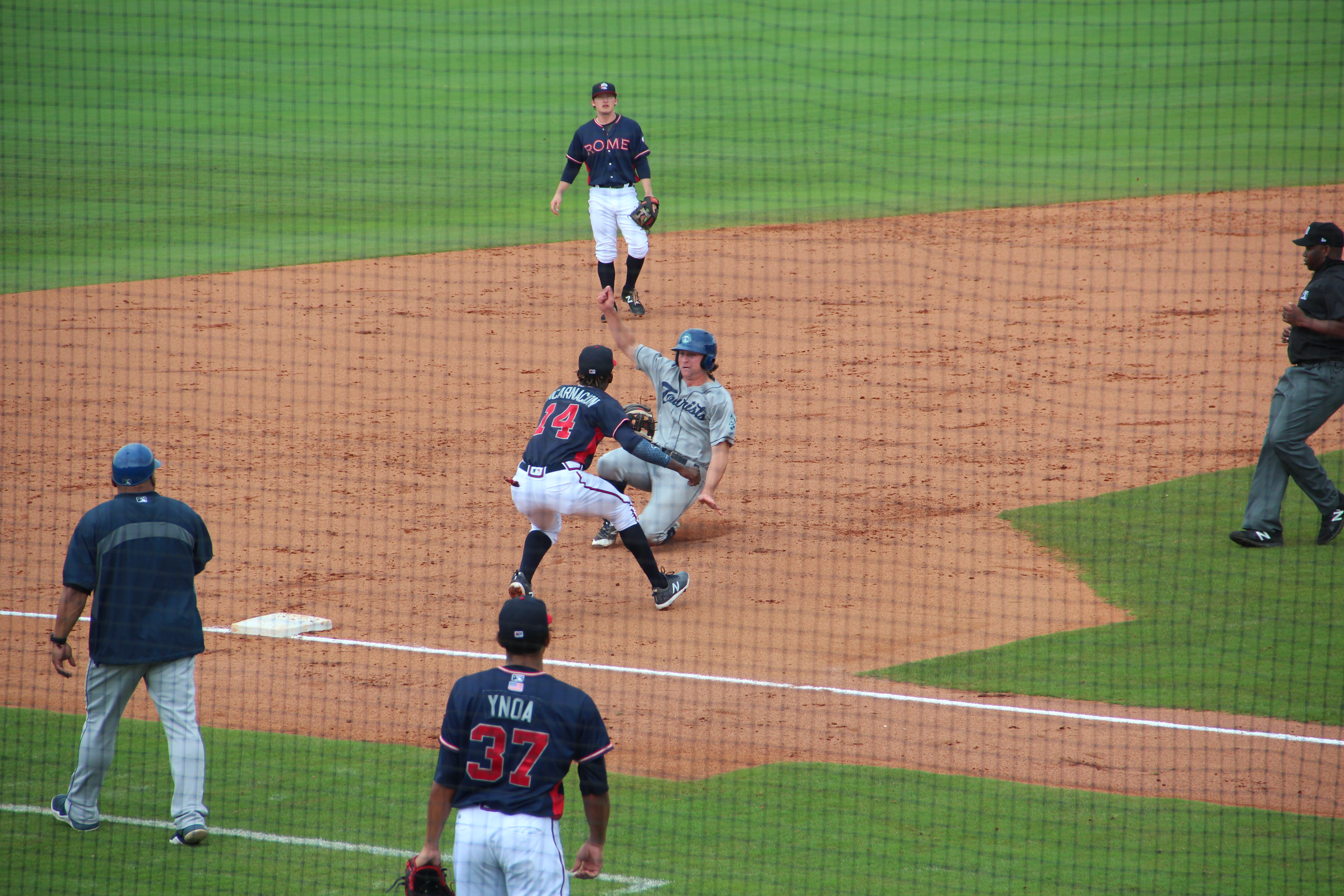
The Asheville Tourists in a game against the Rome Braves

McCormick Field would not be unoccupied for the 1976 season, however. Shortly after the AA franchise moved to Charlotte, its place was taken by an expansion team in the Western Carolinas League (which in 1980 became the South Atlantic League). Like many teams before it, it assumed the Tourists nickname. The team has remained in Asheville continuously since, winning the 1984 league championship. It is currently a farm team of the Houston Astros (1982–93, 2021–), with whom it has been affiliated since 2021. It was previously affiliated with the Texas Rangers (1976–81) and the Colorado Rockies (1994–2020). The team has subsequently won two additional league titles in 2012 and 2014.

In conjunction with Major League Baseball's restructuring of Minor League Baseball in 2021, the Tourists were organized into the High-A East. In 2022, the High-A East became known as the South Atlantic League, the name historically used by the regional circuit prior to the 2021 reorganization.

== Ownership ==
On January 5, 2010 it was reported by the Asheville Citizen-Times that Palace Sports and Entertainment have sold the Asheville Tourists for $7 million to former U.S. Senator and current Governor of Ohio Mike DeWine and his family. It was reported that Brian DeWine, son of Mike, would be the team president. The team is owned by DeWine Seeds-Silver Dollar Baseball. Governor DeWine has a 32% stake in the team but does not play a role in management. In 2020 the team received a $189,500 Paycheck Protection Program loan during the COVID-19 pandemic.

== Roster ==
Asheville Tourists roster
Players	Coaches/Other
Pitchers: 32 Garrett Apker; 36 Jordan Carr; 19 Anthony Cruz; 29 Michael Cuevas; 15 Francisco Frias; 17 Dylan Howard; 33 Colby Langford; 36 Max Martin; 22 Kellan Oakes; 26 Joan Ogando; 14 Luis Rodriguez; 41 Raimy Rodriguez; 2 Yeriel Santos; 39 Conor Steinberg; 35 Parker Smith; 31 Andrew Taylor; 8 Jackson Wells; -- Nico Zeglin; Catchers: 38 Freuddy Batista; 13 John Garcia; 27 Keduar Trujillo; Infielders: 3 Narbe Cruz; 10 Zach Daudet; 28 Jack Moss; 23 Xavier Neyens; 9 Alejandro Nunez; 7 Caden Powell; 1 Kyle Walker; Outfielders: 16 Ethan Frey; 8 Cesar Hernandez; 11 Anthony Huezo; 37 Nehomar Ochoa Jr.; 4 Justin Thomas Jr.	Manager: 25 Nate Shaver; Coaches: 19 T. J. Burgmann (hitting); -- Josiah Hissong (development); -- Craig Prince (pitching); 60-day injured list: 90 Juan Bello; 7-day injured list; * On Houston Astros 40-man roster; ~ Development list; # Rehab assignment; ∞ Reserve list; ‡ Restricted list; § Suspended list; † Temporarily inactive list; Roster updated July 27, 2026; Transactions; → More rosters: MiLB • South Atlantic League; → Houston Astros minor league players

== Notable alumni ==
Baseball Hall of Fame alumni

- Sparky Anderson (1968, Manager) Inducted, 2000
- Craig Biggio (1987) Inducted, 2015
- Eddie Murray (1974) Inducted, 2003
- Willie Stargell (1961) Inducted, 1988
- Billy Southworth (1935–1936, Player/Manager) Inducted, 2008

Notable alumni

- Larry Gardner (1925–1926, Player/Manager)
- Johnny Allen (1929) MLB All-Star
- Mort Cooper (1936) 4 x MLB All-Star; 1942 NL Most Valuable Player
- Walker Cooper (1939) 8 x MLB All-Star
- Clem Labine (1947) 2 x MLB All-Star
- Spook Jacobs (1948) Tri-State League MVP
- Gene Alley (1961–62) MLB All-Star
- Bob Lee (1961) MLB All-Star
- Steve Blass (1962) MLB All-Star
- Bob Lee (1965) MLB All-Star
- Dave Roberts (1964)
- Doc Ellis (1966) MLB All-Star
- Fred Patek (1966) MLB All-Star
- Dave Concepción (1969) MLB All-Star
- Larry Sherry (1971) 1959 World Series MVP
- Al Bumbry (1972) MLB All-Star; 1973 AL Rookie of the Year
- Doug DeCinces (1973) MLB All-Star
- Mike Flanagan(1974) MLB All-Star; 1979 AL Cy Young winner
- Rich Dauer (1974–75)
- Tom Henke (1981) MLB All-Star
- Luis Gonzalez (1988) MLB All-Star
- Kenny Lofton (1989) MLB All-Star
- Shane Reynolds (1989) MLB All-Star
- Bobby Abreu (1992) MLB All-Star
- Melvin Mora (1993) MLB All-Star
- Todd Helton (1995) MLB All-Star
- Matt Holliday (1999) MLB All-Star
- Ubaldo Jiménez (2003) MLB All-Star
- Dexter Fowler (2006) MLB All-Star
- Brian Fuentes (2007) MLB All-Star
- Nolan Arenado (2010) MLB All-Star
- Russell Wilson (2011) NFL Super Bowl Champion
- Trevor Story (2012) MLB All-Star

== Season-by-season records ==
Season	Record	Finish	Manager	Playoffs
1915	74–46	1st	Jack Corbett	League Champs
1916	58–54	4th	Jack Corbett	none
1917	12–16	–	Ernest "Doc" Ferris	none
Team disbanded 1917–1923
1924	58–63	5th	Bob Higgins	none
1925	66–63	5th	Bob Higgins / Larry Gardner	none
1926	80–66	2nd	Larry Gardner	none
1927	76–73	4th	Larry Gardner	none
1928	97–49	1st	Ray Kennedy	none
1929	84–62	2nd	Mike Kennedy	Lost League Finals
1930	79–61	3rd	George Speirs	
1931	66–67	4th	Ray Kennedy / Bobby Hipps	
1932	35–33	–	Joe Guyon	Team disbanded July 7
Team disbanded 1933
1934	34–59 (55–78 overall)	5th	Bill Laval / Possum Whitted	Columbia moved to Asheville June 7
1935	75–62	1st	Billy Southworth	Lost League Finals
1936	40–103	6th	Billy Southworth	
1937	89–50	1st	Hal Anderson	Lost in 1st round
1938	63–75	7th	Hal Anderson	
1939	89–55	1st	Hal Anderson	League Champs
1940	75–60	2nd	Tommy West	Lost in 1st round
1941	64–76	7th	Nick Cullop	
1942	61–77	6th	Bill DeLancey	
Team disbanded 1943–1946
1946	83–57	2nd	Bill Sayles	Lost in 1st round
1947	65–74	6th	Bill Sayles	
1948	95–51	1st	Clay Bryant	Lost in 1st round
1949	76–71	3rd	Ed Head	Lost in 1st round
1950	83–62	2nd	Clay Bryant	Lost League Finals
1951	85–55	2nd	Ray Hathaway	Lost League Finals
1952	65–75	5th	Bill Hart / George Tesnow	
1953	83–67	2nd	Ray Hathaway	Lost in 1st round
1954	86–54	1st	Ray Hathaway	Lost League Finals
1955	53–63	3rd	Earl Naylor	
Team disbanded 1956–1958
1959	70–70	5th	Clyde McCullough	
1960	62–77	6th	Chuck Kress	
1961	87–50	1st	Ray Hathaway	none League Champs
1962	70–70	4th	Ray Hathaway	Lost in 1st round
1963	79–61	2nd	Ray Hathaway	
1964	52–86	8th	Ray Hathaway (28–53) / Bob Clear (24–33)	none
1965	80–60	2nd	Pete Peterson	none
1966	78–61	2nd	Pete Peterson	none
1967	64–74	10th	Chuck Churn	
1968	86–54	1st	Sparky Anderson	none League Champs
1969	69–69	3rd	Alex Cosmidis	none
1970	59–80	8th	Jim Snyder	none
1971	90–51	2nd	Larry Sherry	Lost League Finals
Team known as Asheville Orioles 1972–1975
1976	76–62	1st	Wayne Terwilliger	Lost League Finals
1977	81–58	2nd	Wayne Terwilliger	
1978	73–67	4th	Wayne Terwilliger	none
1979	75–63	2nd	Wayne Terwilliger	
1980	69–71	5th	Tom Robson	
1981	74–68	4th	Tom Robson	
1982	65–76	8th	Dave Cripe	
1983	64–80	9th (t)	Tom Spencer	
1984	73–70	5th	Tom Spencer	League Champs
1985	76–62	4th	Fred Hatfield	
1986	90–50	2nd	Ken Bolek	Lost League Finals
1987	91–48	1st	Keith Bodie	Lost League Finals
1988	65–75	9th	Gary Tuck / Jim Coveney	
1989	68–70	8th	Jim Coveney	
1990	66–77	9th	Frank Cacciatore	
1991	55–83	14th	Frank Cacciatore	
1992	74–66	4th	Tim Tolman	
1993	51–88	14th	Bobby Ramos	
1994	60–73	11th	Tony Torchia	
1995	76–63	5th	Bill McGuire	Lost in 1st round
1996	84–52	1st	P. J. Carey	Lost in 2nd round
1997	62–76	12th	Ron Gideon	
1998	71–69	7th	Ron Gideon	
1999	64–77	11th	Jim Eppard	
2000	66–69	8th (t)	Joe Mikulik	
2001	68–71	9th	Joe Mikulik	
2002	64–74	12th	Joe Mikulik	
2003	74–65	6th	Joe Mikulik	
2004	64–75	13th	Joe Mikulik	
2005	71–67	10th	Joe Mikulik	
2006	74–63	6th	Joe Mikulik	
2007	80–58	4th	Joe Mikulik	
2008	83–56	2nd	Joe Mikulik	
2009	68–70	7th	Joe Mikulik	Lost in 1st round
2010	69–70	7th	Joe Mikulik	
2011	69–70	9th	Joe Mikulik	
2012	88–52	1st	Joe Mikulik	League Champs
2013	63–73	9th	Fred Ocasio	
2014	89–49	1st	Fred Ocasio	League Champs
2015	72–67	2nd	Warren Schaeffer	Lost League Finals
2016	66–72	5th	Warren Schaeffer	
2017	68–70	5th	Warren Schaeffer	
2018	64-73	5th	Robinson Cancel	
2019	68-72	4th	Robinson Cancel	
2020	Season cancelled (COVID-19 pandemic)			
2021	54-72	4th	Nate Shaver	
2022	62-69	4th	Nate Shaver	
2023	51-76	6th	Nate Shaver	
2024	51-79	6th	Nate Shaver	
2025	52-76	6th	Nate Shaver	
