= Demi Adejuyigbe =

British and American writer and comedian

- Adejuyigbe in 2026
- Born: Oluwademilade Adejuyigbe; August 2, 1992 (age 34); London, England
- Education: University of Texas
- Occupations: Writer; comedian; actor; podcaster; musician; social media personality

YouTube information
- Channel: Demi Adejuyigbe
- Years active: 2008–present
- Genres: Comedy; music
- Subscribers: 119 thousand
- Views: 19.9 million
- Last updated: May 9, 2026

Oluwademilade "Demi" Adejuyigbe (/ˈdɛmi əˌdɪdʒuˈiːbeɪ/ DEH-mee ə-DIH-joo-EE-bay; born August 2, 1992) is a British and American writer, comedian, actor, podcaster, musician, and social media personality. He (Note: Adejuyigbe uses both he/him and they/them pronouns. This article uses he/him for consistency.) is best known for co-hosting the podcast Gilmore Guys and writing for the NBC comedy series The Good Place and the CBS late night show The Late Late Show with James Corden. In 2018, he was named as one of Vulture's "38 Comedians You Should and Will Know".

== Early life and education ==
Adejuyigbe was born in London in 1992 to Nigerian parents, and lived in the United Kingdom until he was five years old. His family moved to the United States, settling in Dallas, Texas, where he grew up. He has one younger sister. He attended high school in Texas and then attended the University of Texas at Austin, receiving a B.A. degree in radio, television, and film in 2013. He moved to Los Angeles in 2013 to pursue a career in show business.

== Career ==
=== Beginnings and social media ===
Adejuyigbe initially gained notoriety from his online presence on Vine, posting under the username electrolemon. After moving to Los Angeles at 21, he began working as an office manager for Fox's Animation Domination High Definition programming. He interned at Ben Stiller's Red Hour Productions. Adejuyigbe was hired as a Vine producer for the digital team at Funny or Die, and became a digital producer for @midnight in 2014. He hosted Points Party, a spin-off talk show of @midnight that was posted on Snapchat.

Adejuyigbe gained recognition for his comedy music clips, which he posted to Twitter and YouTube. These included parody raps in the style of Will Smith and an annual video of him dancing to the song "September" by Earth, Wind & Fire – uploaded on September 21st, the date mentioned in the song. In 2018, he sold T-shirts identical to the one he wears in each video, with all of the proceeds (over $17,000) going to RAINN, RAICES, and the National Center for Transgender Equality. In 2020, he used the video as a charity fundraiser, raising over $300,000 to be split between several community organizations. In 2021, he retired the series with a final video that included him dancing on the ceiling like Fred Astaire on "You're All the World to Me" and like in "Dancing on the Ceiling" by Lionel Richie and included thanks from members of Earth, Wind & Fire at the end. In one day, his fundraiser raised over $800,000 for Imagine Waterworks, the West Fund, and the Sunrise Movement. In 2022, he released a theme tune for Stuart Little in the style of Lana Del Rey with vocals by Natalie Walker, benefiting New York Abortion Access Fund.

=== Writing ===
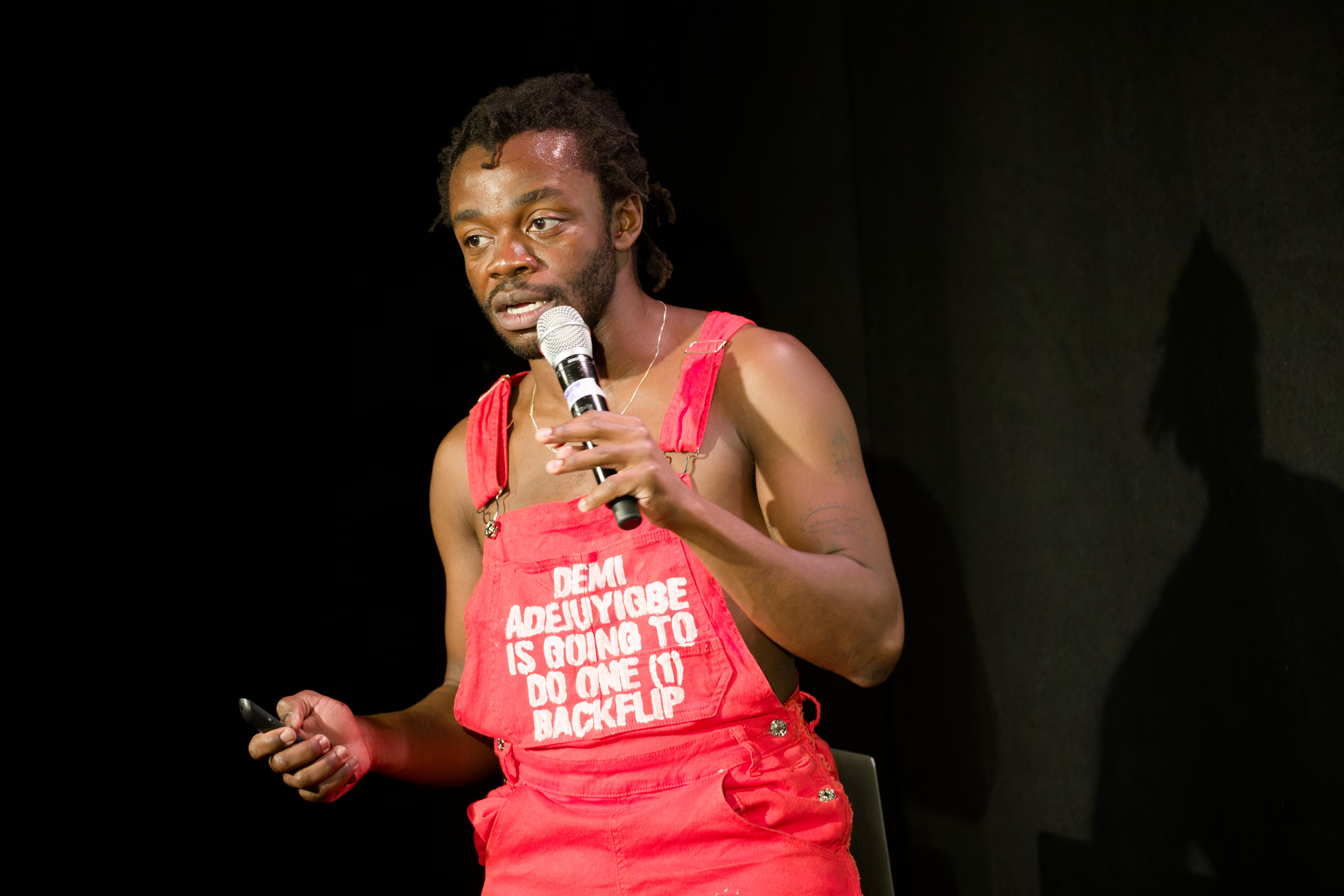
Adejuyigbe performing at Edinburgh Festival Fringe in 2024

Adejuyigbe joined the writers' room for the first season of NBC's The Good Place and was credited on the season's tenth episode, "Chidi's Choice." From 2018 to summer 2019, he worked as a writer for CBS' The Late Late Show with James Corden. In 2020, he wrote for The Amber Ruffin Show.

Adejuyigbe has written articles for various publications including The New Yorker, The Guardian, Thought Catalog, CollegeHumor, and The Hairpin.

=== Podcasts ===
Adejuyigbe co-hosted the Gilmore Guys podcast from 2014 to 2017, in which he and Kevin T. Porter discussed every episode of the television series Gilmore Girls. He became involved with the podcast after Porter, whom he had taken improv classes with at Upright Citizens Brigade, sought guests and co-hosts for the podcast on Twitter and Adejuyigbe responded to the inquiry. By November 2016, they were getting between 150,000 and 200,000 downloads per episode. In 2017, Time included Gilmore Guys in their list of "The 50 Best Podcasts Right Now." Adejuyigbe and Porter held live shows of their podcast across the country and had a cameo appearance in the revival of the series, Gilmore Girls: A Year in the Life.

Adejuyigbe co-hosted the podcast Punch Up the Jam for 86 episodes, from its 2017 inception until late 2019. His co-host was actor, singer, and Vine star Miel Bredouw. In the show, they discussed and then created parodies ("punch-ups") of well-known songs. In June 2019, Adejuyigbe announced his departure from Punch Up the Jam in a tweet made up of images that referenced famous album covers: Fiona Apple's When the Pawn..., The Black Keys' Brothers, Kanye West's The Life of Pablo, and Radiohead's In Rainbows. "I've had a wonderful run, but it's my time to move on," he said. "My last episodes will be dropping in September." Bredouw continued the podcast as its stand-alone host, reformatting the show slightly to allow for discussed songs to be "unpunchable" and including contributions from yMusic's Rob Moose. Adejuyigbe returned to the podcast as a guest in November 2020, for an episode centred on the Weezer track "Beverly Hills”.

As a guest, Adejuyigbe has appeared on podcasts such as Comedy Bang! Bang!, Blank Check with Griffin & David, Maximum Film!, Home Cooking and U Talkin' Talking Heads 2 My Talking Head.

=== Shows ===
Adejuyigbe at the 2026 Edinburgh Festival Fringe

In 2024, Adejuyigbe performed his show Demi Adejuyigbe is Going to Do One (1) Backflip at the Edinburgh Festival Fringe, earning an Edinburgh Comedy Awards nomination for best newcomer. He performed the show in June 2025 across Australia and New Zealand. Backflip was filmed as a Dropout Presents special on July 10 in Los Angeles and was released on the Dropout streaming service on November 19.

In 2026, Adejuyigbe is due to perform his new show Demi Adejuyigbe Sells Out at the Edinburgh Festival Fringe.

== Personal life ==
Adejuyigbe has a cat named Leo.

Adejuyigbe is a member of the Democratic Socialists of America and helped canvass for Nithya Raman during the 2020 Los Angeles election.

Adejuyigbe mentioned in a 2023 Letterboxd review of Poor Things that he had been diagnosed with autism two years prior.

== Credits ==
=== Writer ===
Year	Title	Role	Notes	Ref.
2014	Next Time on Lonny	Production intern	7 episodes	
2014–15	@midnight	Digital producer	35 episodes	
2014–15	Stone Quackers	Office manager	7 episodes	
2015	Axe Cop	Office manager	2 episodes	
2015	Major Lazer	Office manager	5 episodes	
2015	MTV Video Music Awards	Creative consultant		
2016–17	The Good Place	Writer	Wrote episode "Chidi's Choice"	
2017	New Warriors	Writer		
2018	Craig of the Creek	Writer	Co-wrote episode "Wildernessa"	
2018–19	The Late Late Show with James Corden	Writer		
2020–21	The Amber Ruffin Show	Writer, writing supervisor		
2023	Strange Planet	Writer		
2023	Neon	Writer		

=== Actor ===
Year	Title	Role	Notes	Ref.
2014	Keith & Heath	TV Voice #2	Short film	
2016	The Comedy Show Show	Tony the Auto Mechanic	Episode: "Turnt Up! With Eliza Skinner"	
2016	Gilmore Girls: A Year in the Life	Dragonfly Guest	Episode: "Spring"; uncredited	
2017	Follow Me	@Dank4uture	Short film	
2017	Men	Ethan	Short film	
2019	Movie Trivia Schmoedown	"The Electric Lemon"	Episode: "Liz Shannon Miller vs Demi Adejuyigbe"	
2019	Between Two Ferns: The Movie	DJ Fwap		
2020	The George Lucas Talk Show	Self	"The George Lucas Talk Show All Day Star Wars Movie Watch Along"	
2022	Waffles + Mochi's Restaurant	Lonny	Episode: "Cheese"	
2022	Sherman's Showcase	Moussa / Omotayo	Episode: "Sherman From Africa: Live From Lagos"	
2023	Strange Planet	Various roles	Voice role; 10 episodes	
2024	Boys Go to Jupiter	Mr. Moolah (voice)		
2024–25	Smartypants	Himself	2 episodes	
2025–26	Game Changer	Himself/Contestant/You-lympics Commentator/Mysterious Man	5 episodes	
2025–26	Parlor Room	Himself	5 episodes	
2025	The Cheap Seats	Himself	Season 5, episode 9	
2025	Demi Adejuyigbe: Is Going to Do One (1) Backflip	Himself	Also executive producer	
2026	Very Important People	Zinnia	Episode: "Zinnia"	
2026	Guy Montgomery's Guy Mont-Spelling Bee (Australia)	Himself/Contestant	Season 3, 4 episodes	

=== Podcasts ===
Year	Title	Notes	Ref.
2014–17	Gilmore Guys	237 episodes, co-host with Kevin T. Porter	
2015	The Blaze with Lizzie and Kat!	Episode: "047 The Gilmore Guys, Demi Adejuyigbe & Kevin T. Porter - Everybody's Talking 'Bout It"	
2015	How to Be Less Old	Episode 14: "The Fruits of Our Vine"	
2015	Jordan, Jesse, Go!	Episode: "Ep. 382: Cutting the Cheese Mini-sode with Kevin T. Porter and Demi Adejuyigbe"	
2015	Everything's Coming Up Podcast	Episode: The Old Man and the Key (with Demi Adejuyigbe)"	
2015, 2019	Hollywood Handbook	2 episodes	
2016	Can I Pet Your Dog?	Episode 66: "Demi Adejuyigbe and Shar Peis"	
2016	The Dinner Party Download	Episode 364: "Davy Rothbart, Annabelle Gurwich, Gustavo Arellano, Demi Adejuyigbe"	
2016	Drunk Monk Podcast	Episode: "212 Mr. Monk and the TV Star (with Demi Adejuyigbe)"	
2016	Doughboys	Episode 79: "Church's Chicken with Demi Adejuyigbe"	
2016	Pop Rocket	Episode: "Atlanta on FX with Demi Adejuyigbe"	
2016	Shipping Room Podcast	Episode 31: "Jane the Virgin with Demi Adejuyigbe"	
2016, 2018	Yo, Is This Racist?	6 episodes	
2017	Alison Rosen Is Your New Best Friend	2 episodes	
2017	Baby Geniuses	Episode: "Demi Adejuyigbe / Brad Morris"	
2017	Box Angeles	Episode: "BA #181: Demi Adejuyigbe"	
2017	The Bechdel Cast	Episode: "Star Wars: The Force Awakens with Demi Adejuyigbe"	
2017	What the Ephron?	Episode: "What Women Want (feat. Demi Adejuyigbe)"	
2017, 2018	Treks and the City	2 episodes	
2017, 2018	Views From the Vista	2 episodes	
2017, 2019	Get Up on This	Episode 315: "Demi Adejuyigbe"	
2017–19	Punch Up The Jam	87 episodes, co-host with Miel Bredouw	
2017–21	Blank Check with Griffin & David	3 episodes	
2018	Never Not Funny	2 episodes	
2018	Cool Playlist	Episode: "First Day in a Very Cool Outfit with Demi Adejuyigbe"	
2018	Death by Film	Episode 63: "Boss Battle of Bad Movies w/ Demi Adejuyigbe"	
2018	Who Cares About the Rock Hall?	Episode: "Radiohead with Demi Adejuyigbe"	
2018	The Good Place: The Podcast	Episode: "Ch. 10: William Jackson Harper, Actor; Demi Adejuyigbe, Writer"	
2018	High and Mighty	Episode: "168: Going to the Movies w/ Demi Adejuyigbe"	
2018	Everything Is Rent	Episode 11: "You'll See with Kevin T. Porter and Demi Adejuyigbe"	
2018	The Kevin & Bean Show on KROQ	Episode: "Thursday, August 30th with guests: Jensen Karp, Demi Adejuyigbe, and Dr. Drew"	
2018	All Fantasy Everything	2 episodes	
2018	Doug Loves Movies	Episode 1134: "Kumail Nanjiani, Aparna Nancherla, Demi Adejuyigbe, and Matt Besser guest"	
2018	The Cracked Podcast	Episode 260: "15 Emmy Awards We Wish Existed"	
2018	Lovett or Leave It	Episode: "The Wohl of Wall Street"	
2018, 2019	Off Book: The Improvised Musical	2 episodes	
2019	Hello from the Magic Tavern	Episode: "Woodland Creatures"	
2019	Comedy Bang! Bang!	2 episodes	
2019	Good Christian Fun	Episode: "Life of Brian (with Demi Adejuyigbe)"	
2020	Newcomers: Star Wars, with Lauren Lapkus & Nicole Byer	Episode: "Star Wars: Ep. VII - The Last Jedi (w/ Demi Adejuyigbe)	
2020	Couples Therapy	Episode: "#90 Demi Adejuyigbe and Kevin Porter, Megan Gailey and CJ Toledano"	
2020	Karstcast Moviecast	Episode: "#62 Demi Adejuyigbe, I, Tonya, and La La Land"	
2020	Hey Riddle Riddle	Episode: "#92 Unicorn Boner w/ Demi Adejuyigbe"	
2020	U Talkin' Talking Heads 2 My Talking Head	Episode: "American Utopia (w/ Demi Adejuyigbe)"	
2020	Punch Up The Jam	Episode: "'Beverly Hills' by Weezer (w/ Demi Adejuyigbe)"	
2023	Sad Boyz	Episode: "Hollywood Is In Danger (w/ Demi Adejuyigbe)"	
2025	Stavvy's World	Episode: "#155 - Demi Adejuyigbe"	
2025	The Downside with Gianmarco Soresi	Episode: "#318 One Wholesome After Another with Demi Adejuyigbe"	

== Awards and nominations ==
Year	Association	Category	Work	Result	Ref.
2021	Primetime Emmy Awards	Outstanding Writing for a Variety Series	The Amber Ruffin Show	Nominated	
