= Boys Go to Jupiter =

2024 film by Julian Glander

- Theatrical release poster
- Directed by: Julian Glander
- Written by: Julian Glander
- Produced by: Julian Glander; Peisin Yang Lazo
- Starring: Jack Corbett; Janeane Garofalo; Tavi Gevinson; Elsie Fisher; Grace Kuhlenschmidt; Julio Torres; Joe Pera; Miya Folick; Sarah Sherman; Cole Escola; Max Wittert; Chris Fleming; Eva Victor; River L. Ramirez; Demi Adejuyigbe
- Production company: Glanderco
- Distributed by: Cartuna; Irony Point
- Release dates: June 7, 2024 (Tribeca); August 8, 2025 (United States)
- Running time: 87 minutes
- Country: United States
- Language: English
- Box office: $205,203

Boys Go to Jupiter is a 2024 American adult animated coming-of-age film, written, directed, and produced by Julian Glander, in his directorial debut. It stars the voices of Jack Corbett, Janeane Garofalo, Tavi Gevinson, Elsie Fisher, Grace Kuhlenschmidt, Julio Torres, Joe Pera, Miya Folick, Sarah Sherman, Cole Escola, Max Wittert, Chris Fleming, Eva Victor, River L. Ramirez and Demi Adejuyigbe.

It had its world premiere at Tribeca Festival on June 7, 2024, and was released on August 8, 2025, by Cartuna and Irony Point.

== Plot ==
Suburban teenager Billy 5000 lives in Florida. He sometimes hangs out with his kid brother, Peanut, and his friends, Freckles and Beatbox, at the beach. One day during Christmas break, they spot a strange, wormlike creature.

This break, Billy has quit school to get a job with Grubster delivering food, and found a glitch in the app's programming to inflate his earnings, aiming to earn $5000 before the new year so he can move out of his older sister Gail's home. Over the course of his job, he encounters various eccentric restaurant owners and customers, including one mysterious customer who never leaves their hotel room.

One delivery leads him to Dolphin Groves Juice Factory, where he meets his former classmate Rosario "Rozebud" Dolphin, who also happens to be the daughter of the company president. Rozebud has no interest in working at the company she is heir to, showing Billy some specimens from the factory's secret research lab. Billy's friends share a story claiming that Dr. Dolphin is actually a genius dolphin mutated by NASA experiments. Billy also discovers that when he stole an experimental fruit, a strange disk-shaped creature from the lab stowed away in his backpack. He calls the creature Donut, but is reluctant to keep it.

Grubster catches the programming glitch, and Billy loses nearly all his earnings. Around the same time, Dr. Dolphin calls Billy, knowing about his theft of the experimental fruit from the lab but caring more about getting Donut back. Dr. Dolphin explains that Donut is one of the "angels", creatures with powers to grow better fruits who gave Dr. Dolphin's mother the one perfect orange that transformed the juice company from a fruit stand to a major corporation. She offers Billy $5000 cash for Donut's return.

Billy brings Donut to Dolphin Groves, but has a change of heart at the last minute and runs away with Donut. In a moment where Billy nearly gets hit by a car, Donut teleports himself and Billy to the swamp. There, they encounter the creature from the beach, an alien named Glarba. Glarba is both the mom to Donut and the other "angels", and the mystery hotel-room customer, running an intergalactic food and travel vlog reviewing local restaurants. She's generally very enthusiastic about the foods she tries, but overall favors the crunch of styrofoam and plastic packaging. Because Billy took care of Donut, Glarba proposes starting a family with him and her children. Back at Dolphin Groves, Dr. Dolphin faces her own mother (the storied mutant genius dolphin from NASA) over her failure to retrieve Donut, and her mother insists that she let go of her drive for the company and retire, to let Rozebud take over.

Some time after New Year's Day, nobody knows Billy's whereabouts. It's assumed he moved out of town, but as Peanut drops the experimental fruit down a manhole with a winding pipe, it's revealed that Billy is happily living in a cave deep underground, having accepted Glarba's proposal.

== Voice cast ==
- Jack Corbett as Billy 5000
- Janeane Garofalo as Dr. Dolphin
- Tavi Gevinson as Glarba
- Elsie Fisher as Beatbox
- Grace Kuhlenschmidt as Freckles
- Julio Torres as T-bone
- Joe Pera as Herschel Cretaceous
- Miya Folick as Rozebud
- Sarah Sherman as Miss Sharon
- Cole Escola as Old Slippy
- Max Wittert as Byron
- Chris Fleming as Weenie
- Eva Victor as Gail 5000
- River L. Ramirez as Gordon Spaghetti
- Demi Adejuyigbe as Mr. Moolah
- J.R. Phillips as Peanut

== Production ==
In January 2024, it was announced Julian Glander had directed the film, with the voices of Jack Corbett, Janeane Garofalo, Tavi Gevinson, Elsie Fisher, Grace Kuhlenschmidt, Julio Torres, Joe Pera, Miya Folick, Sarah Sherman, Cole Escola, Max Wittert, Chris Fleming, Eva Victor, River L. Ramirez and Demi Adejuyigbe.

== Release ==
It had its world premiere at Tribeca Festival on June 7, 2024. In May 2025, Cartuna and Irony Point acquired distribution rights to the film, and set it for an August 8, 2025, release.

== Reception ==
=== Critical reception ===
On the review aggregator website Rotten Tomatoes, 93% of 59 critics' reviews are positive. The website's consensus reads: "Bouncy, bright, and liminal in scope, Boys Go to Jupiter harnesses the absurd to creatively skewer capitalistic intent through a surreal yet sublimely animated environment." On Metacritic, the film has a weighted average score of 76 out of 100 based on 15 critics, which the site labels as "generally favorable" reviews.

Belen Edwards of Mashable praised the film, writing: "Bizarre, hilarious, and boasting refreshingly distinct animation, Boys Go to Jupiter is a wonderfully absurd experience." Scott Wilson of Loud and Clear Reviews wrote: "A delightful dream of a film."

=== Accolades ===
Award	Date of ceremony	Category	Nominee(s)	Result	Ref.
Chicago Film Critics Association	December 11, 2025	Best Animated Feature	Boys Go to Jupiter	Nominated	
Greater Western New York Film Critics Association	January 10, 2026	Best Animated Film	Boys Go to Jupiter	Nominated	
North Dakota Film Society	January 12, 2026	Best Animated Feature	Boys Go to Jupiter	Nominated	
Independent Spirit Awards	February 15, 2025	John Cassavetes Award	Julian Glander	Nominated	
