= Jack Corbett =

American media producer and voice actor

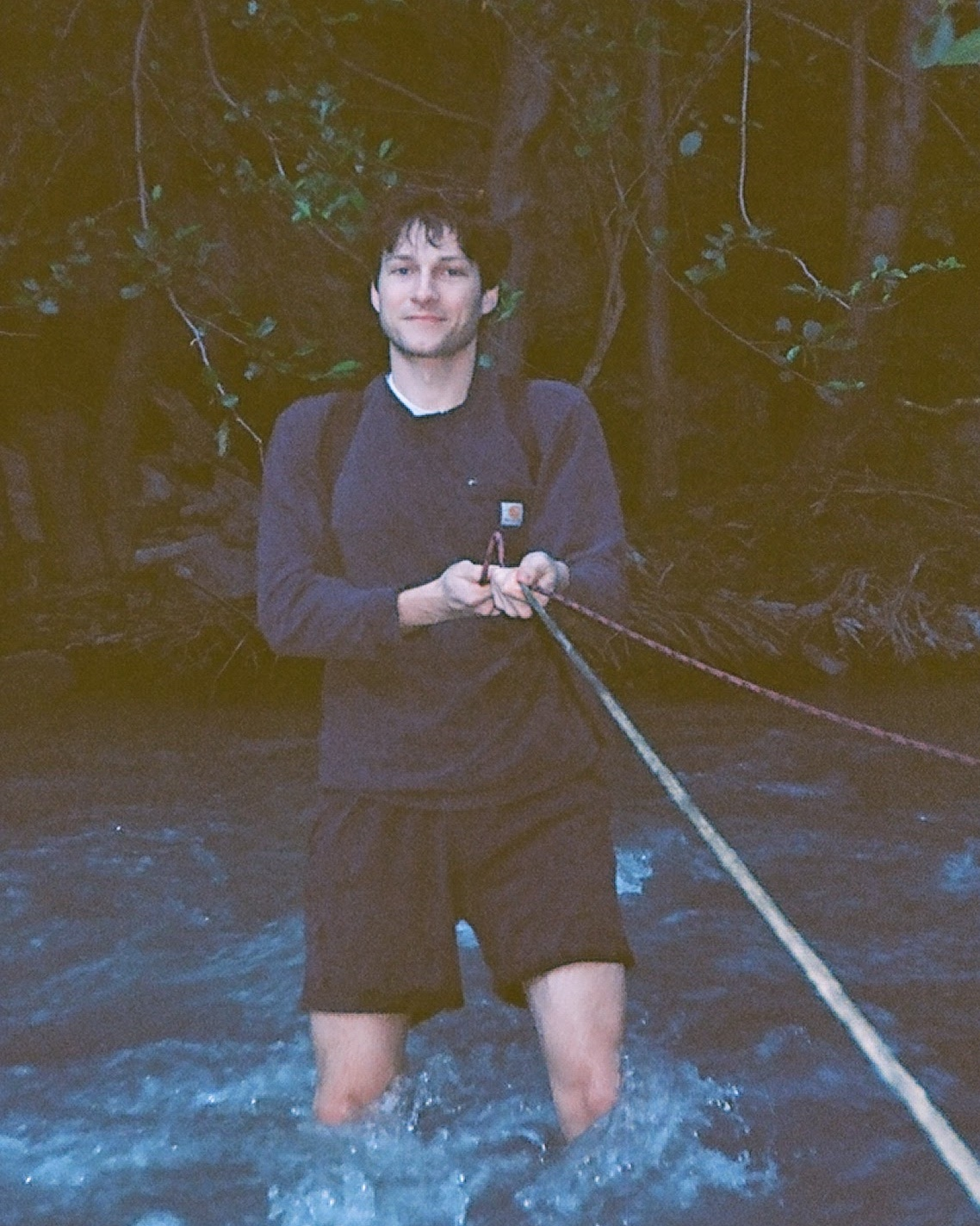
- Occupations: Media producer; voice actor
- Years active: 2019–present
- Employer: NPR
- Known for: Short-form economics videos for NPR's Planet Money; lead voice role in Boys Go to Jupiter

Jack Corbett (born 1996) is an American media producer and voice actor. He makes short-form economics videos for the NPR podcast Planet Money and voiced the lead character, Billy 5000, in Julian Glander's animated feature Boys Go to Jupiter (2025).

== Early life and education ==
Corbett grew up in Granville, Ohio. He studied experimental film and film theory at Ohio State University.

== Career ==
Corbett joined NPR in 2019 as an intern on the Tiny Desk concert series. He later began producing short-form videos for Planet Money that explain economic theories, concepts, and news in a lo-fi, comedic style. He was named "visual host" of Planet Money's TikTok account in March 2024.

In 2025, Corbett voiced Billy 5000, the main character in Julian Glander's feature Boys Go to Jupiter. NPR's All Things Considered aired an interview with Corbett about the part.

== Recognition and reception ==
Corbett's Planet Money videos and on-screen persona have been profiled in national outlets including Teen Vogue, Interview, and Money. His videos have been described as a "Kafkaesque mix of Bill Nye and Tim Burton".

Coverage of Boys Go to Jupiter noted his lead performance, with an interview by Glander in The Verge linking the film's conception to his Planet Money videos.

== Personal life ==
Corbett lives in the Silver Lake neighborhood of Los Angeles.
