= Mree =

American singer-songwriter

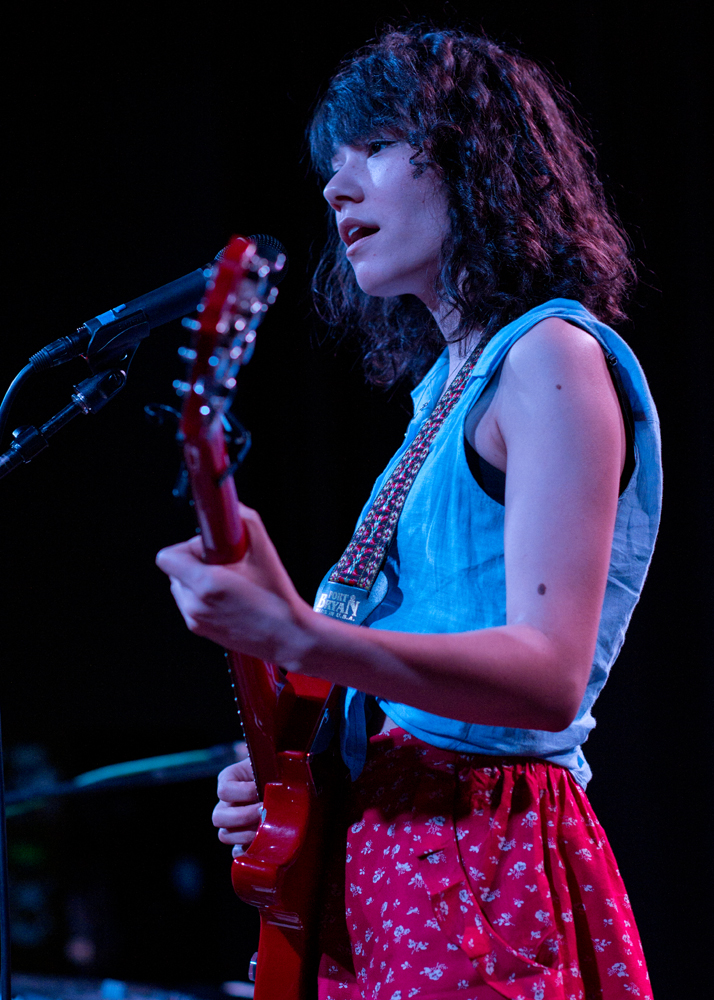
- Mree performs on May 14, 2014

Background information
- Born: Marie Hsiao; November 1, 1993 (age 32)
- Genres: Indie folk, indie pop
- Occupations: Singer-songwriter, musician
- Instruments: Vocals, guitar, piano, ukulele
- Years active: 2011–present
- Website: mreemusic.com

Marie Hsiao (born November 1, 1993), better known as Mree, is an American indie folk singer-songwriter. She is of Taiwanese and Bulgarian descent. Mree began writing her own songs at the age of 14 and released her debut studio album, Grow, in October 2011.

== Music career ==
Hsiao began her career performing cover songs on YouTube. In 2011, she released her self-produced debut studio album, Grow

Mree released her second self-produced studio album, Winterwell, in August 2013. In 2014, the album was awarded at Independent Music Awards in the "best producer" category, with jurors praising the "sophisticated soundscapes that cushion the songs."

As a performer, Mree has appeared at New York City venues including the Highline Ballroom, Rockwood Music Hall, and The Studio at Webster Hall.

In 2013, a Target commercial was released that featured a thirty-second clip of an original Christmas song by her entitled "Santa Catcher." On December 8, 2015, she released her third studio album, Empty Nest.

In February 2016, Mree announced a collaboration with her husband, musician Henri Bardot, which they called Perlo that released Patterns in March 2016. Beginning in 2023 Mree joined with her husband, as well as her friend Kina Grannis and Grannis' husband Imaginary Future, in a musical group called "people i like". In 2024, Mree performed at the Kinnara AAPI Music and Food Festival.

== Discography ==
=== Albums ===
- Grow (2011)
- Winterwell (2013)
- Empty Nest (2015)
- Silver and Gold – EP (2017)
- The Middle – EP (2019)
- Bloom – EP (2020)

=== Singles ===
- "Lift Me Up" (2011)
- "Of the Trees" (2011)
- "Monsters" (2012)
- "Into The Well" (2013)
- "Fame (Cover)" (2014)
- "Talkabout" (2015)
- "The Evergreen" (2016)
- "Passion (Sanctuary) (Cover)" (2016)
- "Lava Lamp (Cover)" (2017)
- "Harvest Moon" (2017)
- "In the Kitchen" (2018)
- "The Middle" (2018)
- "Face My Fears" (2019)
- "In Your Eyes / Open Arms" (2020)
- "May" (2020)
- "Ode to Undertale" (2021)
- "Some Days" (2022)
- "Face Down" (2023)
