= Can I Pet Your Dog? =

Comedy podcast

- Genre: Comedy
- Language: English

Cast and voices
- Hosted by: Allegra Ringo; Renee Colvert; Alexis B. Preston

Production
- Length: 30–60 minutes

Publication
- No. of episodes: 326 (as of 15 February 2022)
- Original release: July 29, 2015
- Provider: Maximum Fun
- Updates: Weekly (Tuesdays)

Can I Pet Your Dog? (CIPYD) is a weekly, comedic podcast on dogs that was first released July 19, 2015. The podcast is hosted by Allegra Ringo (Episodes 1–188), Alexis B. Preston (189–present), Renee Colvert, and produced by Travis McElroy (episodes 1–57) and Alexis B. Preston (episodes 58–present). It is distributed online by Maximum Fun.

== Background ==
The format of each episode is divided between segments discussed by the hosts and their guests. Segments include "hero dogs" and "dog tech." Originally, the show featured a segment called "Mutt Minute" wherein a host is assigned the task of educating the audience on a dog breed in under a minute. Starting in episode 143, this segment is replaced with "My Mutt Minute", where listeners submit a one-minute voice recording about their own dogs.

The show had Lesli Margherita on as a guest to discuss Pit Bull awareness month.

The show has done live episodes.

== Reception ==
Splitsider's Elizabeth Stamp reviewed the first episode favorably stating "If you love comedy and cute dogs, there's finally a podcast to satisfy both your interests." The Forum of Fargo-Moorhead's Dr. Susan Mathison called Can I Pet Your Dog? "a burst of pure delight" and "too cute". Shaheena Uddin wrote in The Guardian that the show "boasts and impressive lineup of guests." In The A.V. Club, Brianna Wellen commented on an episode calling it "a heart-wrenching reminder of why we love our pets so much".
