= Art Sqool =

2019 video game

- Developer: Julian Glander
- Publishers: RedDeerGames; Sonka
- Composer: Julian Glander
- Engine: Unity
- Platforms: Windows; MacOS; Switch
- Release: Windows, MacOS: WW: February 5, 2019; Switch: WW: November 19, 2020
- Genre: Art game
- Mode: Single-player

Art Sqool (/skuːl/) is an art game developed by Julian Glander. It was released on February 5, 2019, for Microsoft Windows and MacOS, and on November 19, 2020, for Nintendo Switch. The Switch version received negative reviews, citing a lack of depth, but was praised for its art style and elements of surrealism.

== Gameplay ==
The game follows "Froshmin", an art student whose work is judged by a "neural network" serving as their professor. Players are provided a prompt by the professor and asked to create artwork matching this prompt. The artwork is then "graded" by the professor, though the resulting grade and score is randomised. Froshmin can collect additional brushes and colors by exploring the campus.

== Development ==
Glander developed the game using Unity, though hired developers as needed. Speaking to Game Developer, Glander explained that he set out to create "a gentle [Grand Theft Auto]", with the creation of art as the primary aspect of gameplay. The setting and art style was inspired by Super Monkey Ball and mini golf courses, while the gameplay mechanic took inspiration from Kid Pix. While Glander did not attend art school themselves, the game includes prompts based on genuine art school tasks. Glander also produced the soundtrack to the game, making use of automated drum patterns and synthesizers generated by GarageBand, in addition to a vocaloid.

== Reception ==
Art Sqool received "generally unfavorable reviews" according to Metacritic.

Criticism focused on the game's lack of depth and randomised grading system. John Walker of Rock Paper Shotgun called it "a tiresome chore to play through" and encouraged prospective players to use Microsoft Paint instead. Some reviewers, however, praised its art style and surrealist nature, and others noted its commentary on arts education.
