= Hal Anderson (baseball) =

American baseball player (1904–1974)

- Outfielder
- Born: February 10, 1904; St. Louis, Missouri, U.S.
- Died: May 1, 1974 (aged 70); St. Louis, Missouri, U.S.
- Batted: Right Threw: Right

MLB debut
- April 12, 1932, for the Chicago White Sox

Last MLB appearance
- April 24, 1932, for the Chicago White Sox

MLB statistics
- Batting average: .250
- Home runs: 0
- Hits: 8
- Runs batted in: 2
- Stats at Baseball Reference

Teams
- Chicago White Sox (1932)

Harold Anderson (February 10, 1904 – May 1, 1974) was an American professional baseball outfielder, manager, and scout. He appeared in nine games in Major League Baseball as a center fielder for the 1932 Chicago White Sox, but was a longtime star in the American Association and a manager of farm teams in the St. Louis Cardinals' organization.

Born in St. Louis, Anderson threw and batted right-handed and was listed as 5 feet 11 inches (1.80 m) tall and 160 pounds (73 kg). He entered baseball in 1922 and by 1926 he was a regular outfielder for the St. Paul Saints of the American Association, one of the three top-level minor leagues of the era. Anderson was not known for his power at the plate, but consistently reached double figures in stolen bases and batted over .295 for the next six years. His tenure with the Saints culminated with the 1931 season, during which he batted .314 and set personal bests in home runs (23) and runs batted in (95).

The performance led the White Sox to acquire his contract and use Anderson as their starting center fielder for their first eight games of the 1932 American League season. He broke in on April 12 with two hits in five at bats and two runs batted in, then, six days later, he had a three-hit game. But all his hits were singles and he stole no bases. With Anderson only eight-for-32 (.250), he lost his starting job to Elias "Liz" Funk and appeared in only one more MLB game, on April 24 as a defensive replacement.

The White Sox sent him back to the minors, where he played through 1939. However, in July 1932, the Cardinals purchased Anderson's contract and assigned him to the Columbus Red Birds of the American Association, where he played through 1936 and later returned as Columbus' manager from 1947–1949. Anderson spent more than two decades with the Cardinals as a scout and minor-league skipper.
