= Ian Karmel =

American stand-up comedian and writer (born 1984)

- Born: October 9, 1984 (age 41); Portland, Oregon, U.S.
- Education: Portland State University
- Occupations: Actor; writer; comedian
- Years active: 2011–present
- Spouse: Dana Schwartz (m. 2022)
- Children: 1
- Website: iankarmel.com

Ian Karmel (born October 9, 1984) is an American stand-up comedian and writer. He was the co-head writer for CBS’ The Late Late Show with James Corden from 2015 until the show ended in 2023. He wrote for the 2017 and 2018 Grammy Awards as well as the 2016 Tony Awards. His work on the 2016 Tony Awards earned him an Emmy Award nomination for Outstanding Writing for a Variety Special. His work on Carpool Karaoke: When Corden Met McCartney Live From Liverpool won him an Emmy in 2019.

== Early life ==
Karmel was born into a Jewish family in Portland, Oregon and raised in Beaverton. He graduated from Westview High School, and subsequently earned a bachelor's degree in political science from Portland State University. His sister, psychologist and nutritionist, Dr. Alisa Karmel, is the coauthor of his book, T-Shirt Swim Club: Stories from Being Fat in a World of Thin People.

== Career ==
Karmel trained at the Los Angeles improv company The Groundlings and the Upright Citizens Brigade. He has been a regular contributor to the Portland Mercury, writing the weekly column "Everything as F*ck".

He made his late night debut in 2014 on TBS' Conan, and was also in 2014 featured on Comedy Central's Adam DeVine's House Party Season 2.

In 2015, he released his album 9.2 on Pitchfork through the Portland label Kill Rock Stars.

Karmel was featured in the Netflix 15-minute standup special series The Comedy Lineup, which premiered on July 3, 2018.

Karmel's other TV credits include IFC's sketch comedy series Portlandia and the Travel Channel's food reality TV series Adam Richman's Best Sandwich in America. He has been a guest post-game analyst and commentator for the Portland Trail Blazers.

He also serves as the lead voice and creative force behind the weekly podcast All Fantasy Everything on the HeadGum network.

== Filmography ==
=== Film ===
Year	Title	Role	Notes	Ref.
2009	Summer of 69	George		

=== Television ===
Year	Title	Role	Network	Notes	Ref.
2020	Game On!	Self	CBS		
2026	FIFA World Cup on FOX After Hours with James Corden	Self (co-host)	Nightly recap during 2026 FIFA World Cup		
