= Chris Fleming (comedian) =

American comedian (born 1987)

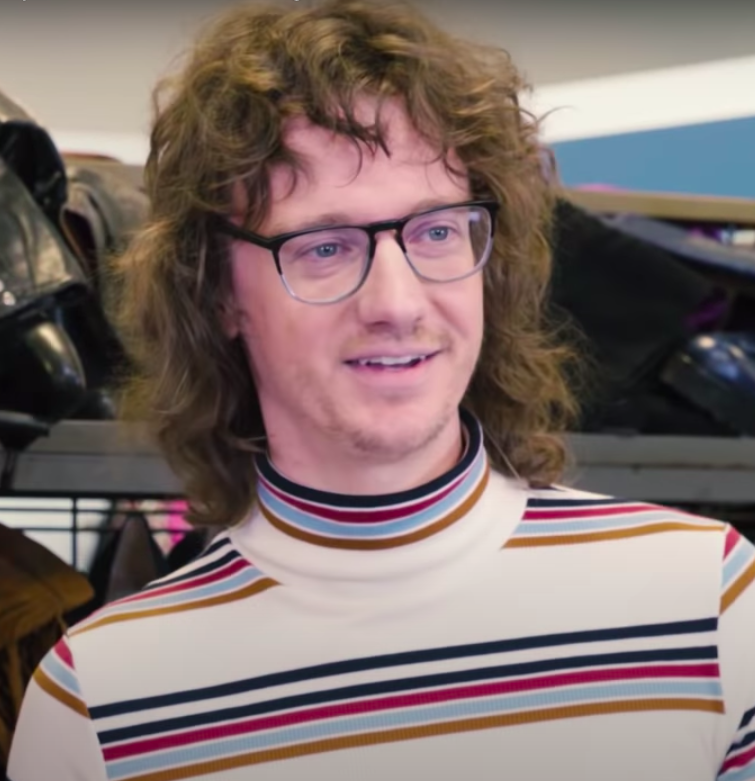
- Fleming in 2018
- Born: January 29, 1987 (age 39); Stow, Massachusetts, U.S.
- Education: Skidmore College
- Occupations: Comedian; YouTube personality; actor; musician

YouTube information
- Channel: chuntzit
- Years active: 2009–present
- Subscribers: 484,000
- Views: 94.23 million
- Last updated: September 23, 2026

Chris Fleming (born January 29, 1987) is an American comedian and actor first known for their (Note: Fleming does not have a preferred pronoun, this article uses they/them for consistency.) YouTube series Gayle, in which they star as the eponymous character Gayle Waters-Waters. In June 2019, Variety named Fleming one of its "10 Comics to Watch for 2019." In 2026, Fleming was nominated for a Primetime Emmy Award for Outstanding Writing for a Variety Special for the special Chris Fleming: Live at the Palace.

Fleming is known for their unique, specific character comedy and "powerful, ridiculous songs." Much of their comedy is aimed at deconstructing social norms, including masculinity. They have been said to have an online cult following.

Fleming has been described as a "progressive gender-bending role model." They have said they accept any pronouns: "Anything works for me."

== Early life and Education ==
Fleming grew up in Stow, Massachusetts, and attended Nashoba Regional High School. During their junior year, they began studying stand-up comedy under Rick Jenkins at The Comedy Studio in Cambridge, Massachusetts.

In 2007, Fleming performed stand-up during HBO's 13th annual Comedy Festival in Aspen, Colorado.

Fleming received a degree in theater from Skidmore College in 2009 and graduated one credit short of receiving a minor in dance.

== Gayle ==
Gayle is a 40-episode absurdist comedy series on YouTube. It is written by Fleming and directed by comedian Melissa Strype, who also plays Gayle's daughter, Terry Gross Waters-Waters. It launched in 2012, and its final episode was published in 2015.

The series follows high-strung, eccentric suburban mother Gayle Waters-Waters and her ruthless journey to uphold social status in the small, fictional community of Northbread, Massachusetts. Fleming developed the idea for Gayle through their stand-up comedy. In 2019, they described the character's origin:

I did Gayle in my stand-up, and she was inspired by a lot of folks that I saw growing up...It kind of cemented as ideas do in a very singular moment when I was in a Crate & Barrel, and I saw a woman diving into a barrel of placemats. Like her legs were up in the air, and she was just digging through these placemats...it just kind of came from there...I just plucked her from a tree...I have elements of her in my psyche, too; it's not a gender-specific thing. It's fear of how you're seen in your community, that's what it is, that's the essence of it...Why I related to her so much is just that terror of how others perceive you.

Fleming's mother co-stars as Bonnie, Gayle's best friend and biggest rival (i.e., frenemy). Gayle's sensitive birdwatching husband, Dave, does not reveal his face during Gayle; his voice is provided by Fleming, while his legs are portrayed by Fleming's father.

The soundtrack is by Brian Heveron-Smith, Tom Lowery, and Chris Hartford. The series is filmed in Fleming's hometown of Stow, Massachusetts.

Forbes reported that, in the off-seasons of filming Gayle, Fleming worked as an SAT tutor.

Circa 2013, comedian Margaret Cho became interested in the show. In 2013, she guest starred in the episode "Chibby Point" as Yo-Yo Ma, whom Gayle kidnapped from a Barnes & Noble.

In 2014, the Gayle team went on a US tour with the show Gayle Live.

Although much of their hometown supports the series, with some neighbors even participating as actors, Fleming has said:

There's one woman who a lot of [Gayle] was inspired by who is NOT happy about it at all...[she's] absolutely pissed [because her full name is used for a background character]. I forget to change people's names sometimes, so a lot of my life has been trying to explain to people's faces that something that is very obviously about them is not about them.

Fleming has expressed regret that COMPANY IS COMING, a viral 2015 short featuring Gayle, is the series' best-known project and "what I get stopped at airports for." Fleming dislikes when Gayle is seen purely as a "crazy mom," claiming the character transcends the stereotype:

I've played that character for so long I have such love for her...there's so many different facets to her. That's just one part of her being. I hate that that's what people think of her in general. There's so many other beautiful shades to her psyche.

== Sketch Comedy ==
Fleming runs a YouTube channel under their full name; the channel has gained over 465,000 subscribers as of May 2025. In addition to Gayle, Fleming has a variety of other content, from music videos to car rants. They also post videos on their Twitter and Instagram pages.

Fleming's 2015 video "COMPANY IS COMING," starring their Gayle character, went viral, accruing over 15.6 million views as of June 2026. In 2018, Fleming lampooned this viral video as a Faustian deal with a demon named Davis, who says, "We made a deal; one viral video in 2015 for a lifetime of servitude! You promised me your soul for your video COMPANY IS COMING going viral, and now sorority girls from the South like you for all the wrong reasons!"

Fleming is known for their specific, unique character comedy.

In 2020, they created "Sick Jan," a song and music video detailing their former H&R Block tax preparer who exhibited unusual behavior that intrigued Fleming. In 2022, New York magazine asked them about Sick Jan's similarities to Deirdre, a character in the 2022 film Everything Everywhere All at Once. Fleming said:

Jan's not an archetype, Jan's such a specific woman. ... [The] story of Sick Jan, the character herself, is so dense—maybe it's just that all tax preparers have a vibe of anarchy and Southwestern style. With Jan, obviously, it was one song, so I could focus only on the fact that she was chronically sick for three years and never addressed it. And also her desire to go to jail—her overwhelming desire. People talk about sexual tension in the video a lot, but it's just between Jan and the prison system. ... I remember putting her on speakerphone so my friends could hear her, because she would use this catchphrase while also coughing.

In 2020, Fleming said that "Sick Jan" and "DePiglio" were their personal favorites of their YouTube videos.

In 2022, Fleming created a mockumentary-style interview with an eccentric male character who explains his invention of the word "umpteenth."

== Stand-up comedy ==
In 2010, Fleming moved to Los Angeles after signing with the talent agency that managed Dane Cook. Fleming has said, "I was signed to a manager who seduced me to moving out to L.A., and as soon as I got there, she promptly became a chef."

In 2011, describing Fleming's brand of comedy, Comedy Studio owner Rick Jenkins said, "Chris isn't a funny comedian; he's an interesting person who sees the world in a funny way. Chris's world is this rubbery, cartoonish, absurd place filled with over-the-top, self-important characters. It's a really cool world he shows us."

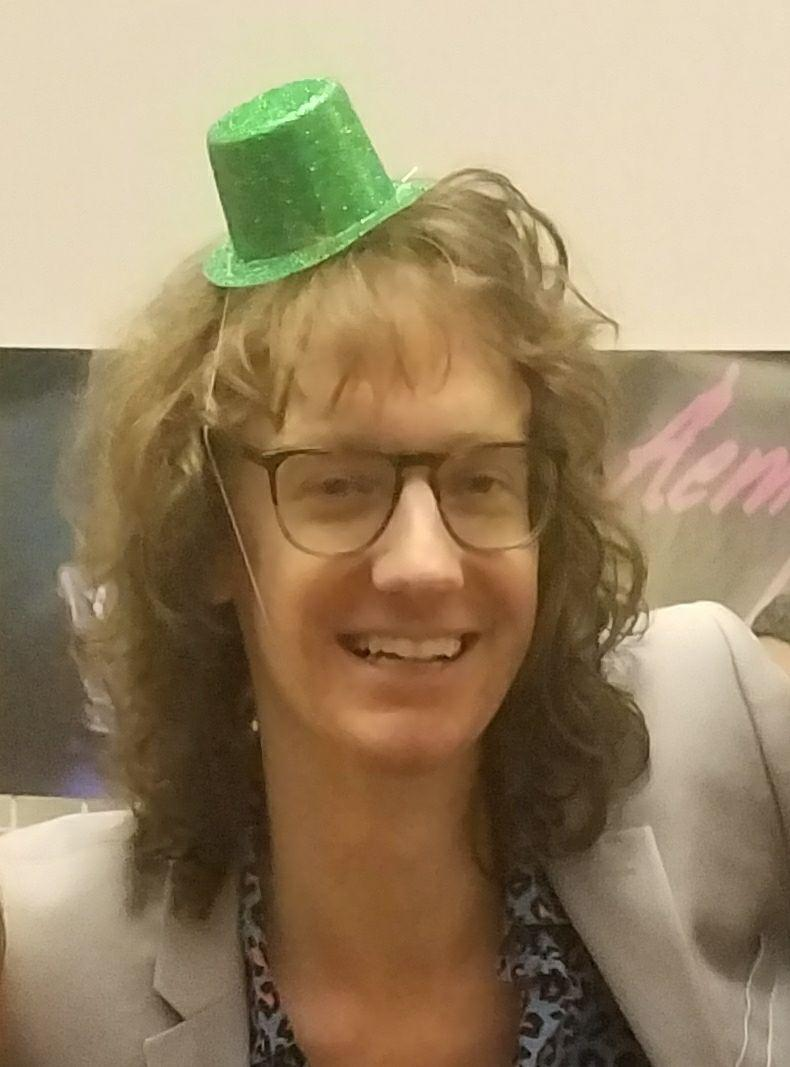
Chris Fleming in 2017 at The Wilbur in Boston, Massachusetts

In January 2012, Fleming's friend, comedian Gary Gulman, invited Fleming to a party to meet successful L.A. comedians from Boston. Upon arriving, Fleming realized they were at comedian Dane Cook's house, and it was a watch party of the NFL playoff between the New England Patriots and the Baltimore Ravens. While receiving a tour of the house, Fleming complimented its appearance, comparing it to a Crate & Barrel; Cook was not amused by the joke. Dressed in androgynous clothing and knowing nothing about football, Fleming felt "freak[ed] out" and claims to have lost their sense of spatial awareness. They sat on Bill Burr's armrest "like a toy breed," eventually humiliating themself by sneezing "directly into the pleat of Bill Burr's khakis." During their 2020 Boba Everyday tour, Fleming described the experience in detail. On January 22, 2012, Cook tweeted a photographic lineup of comedians at the party, including Fleming. Fleming displayed this photo at the end of the stand-up routine as evidence of the party. Fleming lampooned their differences in appearance by displaying the Bostonian comedians with a Dropkick Murphys song and their own face accompanied by "Last Christmas" by Wham!

In 2016 and 2017 they toured the United States with their stand-up comedy show Showpig. When asked about the title, Fleming said, "I fancy myself a showpig—grease me up and send me to market!"

Describing their comedic process to WBUR-FM in 2019, Fleming said,

I burn the formula every time I make something. I really revel in making things that no one is asking for. I think it might be the nature of being anti-establishment is like, when people like something, they're like, "Oh we want more of this." I'm going to give them something completely out of left field. I think that's a way to make inspired work. To follow yourself and not to follow what David Bowie called "The Gallery."

Fleming is likely referring to Bowie's advice for young artists, in which Bowie says, "Never play for the gallery...Never work for other people at what you do."

Fleming's stand-up tour Boba Everyday began in late 2019 and was postponed until 2021 due to the COVID-19 pandemic. In October 2020, Fleming announced Forest Musings, a virtual show. In August 2021, Fleming announced their stand-up tour, Tricky Tricky. In May 2022, they announced a summer stand-up tour with venues in British Columbia, Texas, New York, Ontario, and Vermont.

A staff writer for FSUNews, covering a 2022 appearance at Florida State University, praised Fleming's stand-up performance's underlying message, writing, "Fleming does not seem to give too much respect to anything, including himself, which allows him to rid different social norms and constructs of their power."

When Vulture asked for the best comedy advice they had received, Fleming responded, "Rick Jenkins, owner of the Comedy Studio [in Harvard Square], taught me that, through clarity with your audience, even the most absurd idea can be accessible—also, that no idea is too absurd."

Fleming's special Chris Fleming: Live at the Palace premiered on HBO Max on February 27, 2026. It was produced by, among others, Conan O'Brien and Jeff Ross. For the writing on the special, Fleming was nominated for the Primetime Emmy Award for Outstanding Writing for a Variety Special.

== Gender identity ==
Fleming lampooned their audience's questions about their gender in a 2016 video titled "Am I A Man?" Their response was, "Can I consider myself a man if, in a pinch, I can dry myself off with a hand towel?"

In their 2018 stand up comedy special "Showpig", Fleming said "I'm not a man. I'm not a woman. I'm a showpig." When asked for their preferred pronouns in a 2019 The Peak interview, Fleming said, "Anything works for me." In 2016, they gave the following definition of manhood:

My concept of a man is someone who whacks their elbow a little bit at a Bertucci's and has no hang-ups about freaking out—zero qualms about going full Streetcar Named Desire at 2 PM...

Fleming satirizes their relationship with masculinity in their comedy, such as with their 2016 song "I'm Afraid to Talk To Men" and 2022 monologue "Men and Me." When asked whether they felt secure in their masculinity, they responded:

Oh, I'm not secure with my masculinity, I just don't have any masculinity. There's just such a lack of it, I have no respect for it.

Fleming routinely describes the way they are perceived by others in their stand-up. In regard to their appearance, they compared themself to "a cocker spaniel who is bi at best," a "woman [...] from the woods" and "an American Girl doll that got left out in the rain." In 2022, they said, "If I'm at a restaurant with a group, the waiter will ask the women, me, children, then men. That's the order of operations [...] I've got a Gaia thing going on, Mother Goose energy."

On Spilling Your Seed With Chloe Troast, Fleming answers Troast's inquiry of their gender with: "I'm just keeping my eyes on the road." A gender reveal gag follows, where their gender is revealed to be "two Brandi Carlile tickets". To this, Fleming reacts, "Fuck, that's what I was afraid of."

== Filmography ==
=== Pilot ===
Beginning in about 2019, Fleming created the WarnerMedia/Adult Swim pilot I'm the Mayor of Bimmi Gardens. The pilot was shot in Atlanta, Georgia, in the summer of 2021. It featured Fleming as the protagonist, a "mayor of a town off the coast of Florida (but technically a territory of Maine)." Other actors included Victoria Pedretti, Perfume Genius, and Ms. Pat.

In 2022, Fleming told Vulture: "[The pilot] didn't get picked up by the network that we made it for, so we're trying to get it somewhere else." On August 3, 2022, Fleming shared screenshots of the pilot along with captions explaining scenes and thanking the actors. The full pilot was released on YouTube in late 2024.

=== Film ===
Year	Title	Role
2012	Genderfreak	Zach
2019	The Last Laugh	Palace Comic
2024	Boys Go to Jupiter	Weenie (voice)
2027	The Comeback King	TBA
2027	The Catch	TBA

=== Television ===
Year	Title	Role	Notes
2012–15	Gayle	Gayle Waters-Waters	Main role; Writer
2019	Corporate	Todd	
2019	Splitting Up Together	Rando	
2019	Twelve Forever	Mr. Fleming	Voice role
2019	The Diaper	Sert	
2020–25	Bigtop Burger	Cesare	Voice role
2021	Adventure Time: Distant Lands	New Death	Voice role, Episode: "Together Again"
2021	Summer Camp Island	Professor Q.	Voice role, Episode: "Oscar and the Monsters Chapter 1: Unaccompanied Oscar"
2022	Waffles + Mochi's Restaurant	Donny	Episode: "Cheese"
2025	Abbott Elementary	Leonard	Episode: "Karaoke"
2025	The Great North	Meldrick	Voice role, Episode: "Bust a Moon Adventure"
2026	Widow's Bay	The Shaman	2 episodes

=== Comedy specials ===
Year	Title	Network/Streaming service
2018	Showpig	YouTube
2023	Hell	Peacock
2026	Live at the Palace	HBO
