= List of Critical Role episodes =

Episodes of the web series Critical Role

Critical Role episodes split by campaign and then by year, as well as one-shot episodes.

== Series overview ==
Campaign	Party	Episodes	Originally released		
Campaign	Party	Episodes	First released	Last released	Network
Main series
1	Vox Machina	115	March 12, 2015	October 12, 2017	Twitch, YouTube, Alpha (from 2016)
2	The Mighty Nein	141	January 11, 2018	June 3, 2021	Twitch, YouTube, Alpha (until 2019)
3	Bells Hells	121	October 21, 2021	February 6, 2025	Twitch, YouTube, Beacon (from 2024)
4	The Soldiers, The Seekers, and The Schemers (Note: Due to the number of players, after episode four, the player cast split into three, smaller adventuring parties.)	43	October 2, 2025	TBD	Twitch, YouTube, Beacon
Anthology series
Exandria Unlimited	The Crown Keepers	10 (Note: Includes two episodes from the continuation Exandria Unlimited: Kymal)	June 24, 2021	April 1, 2022	Twitch, YouTube
Exandria Unlimited: Calamity	The Ring of Brass	4	May 26, 2022	June 16, 2022	Twitch, YouTube
Exandria Unlimited: Divergence	—N/a	4	February 13, 2025	March 6, 2025	Twitch, YouTube, Beacon
Limited and related series
One-shots	Various	77	February 25, 2016	TBD	Twitch, YouTube, Alpha (2016–2019), Beacon (2024–present)
The Re-Slayer's Take	The Re-Slayer's Take	31	May 20, 2024	March 3, 2025	Twitch, YouTube, Beacon
Wildemount Wildlings	O.L.G.A. Cabin	3	April 3, 2025	April 17, 2025	Twitch, YouTube, Beacon

== Campaigns ==
=== Campaign one (2015–2017) ===
The Vox Machina campaign originated as the home game of the cast, played from 2012 to 2017; the show begins in medias res with the characters regrouping in the city of Emon after approximately 6 months apart and the streamed campaign picks up where the cast's original home game left off. While the adventures prior to the Kraghammer arc (2015) were not formally recorded, some shorter recordings have been released by the cast. This includes audio from the first session of the campaign, which was released as a segment in the third episode of the podcast All Work No Play. Additionally, Liam O'Brien released a recording of the magic carpet being discovered by the party. Episode 36 features a summary of the pre-series history, with artwork created by Wendy Sullivan Green and voice-overs provided by the cast. The comic book, Critical Role: Vox Machina Origins, is an adaptation of the group's game before the show. The animated series, The Legend of Vox Machina, also adapts a canonic story that took place within the pre-stream time frame.

Campaign one originally broadcast live on the Geek & Sundry Twitch and YouTube channels between March 12, 2015, and October 12, 2017, for a total of 115 episodes. Starting in November 2016, it was also broadcast live on the Alpha streaming service from Legendary Digital Networks. The show on Alpha had a unique overlay that included "real-time character sheets, damage and heal animations, and visualizations". Campaign one's closed captions were transcribed by a fan group who submitted them to Geek & Sundry. Geek & Sundry then added these to the YouTube copies of episodes. The VODs have since been uploaded to Critical Role's own YouTube channel.

The episodes of campaign one spilt by year:

Year	Episodes	Originally released	
Year	Episodes	First released	Last released
2015	1–36	March 12, 2015	December 17, 2015
2016	37–79	January 14, 2016	December 15, 2016
2017	80–115	January 5, 2017	October 12, 2017

=== Campaign two (2018–2021) ===
The second campaign began on January 11, 2018, and follows the adventuring party known as The Mighty Nein. The story is set on the continent of Wildemount, which was briefly visited during the Vox Machina campaign. The Mighty Nein campaign is set about 20 years after Vox Machina's final battle against Vecna; it takes place at a time when tensions are very high between the Dwendalian Empire and the Kryn Dynasty, two of Wildemount's major powers.

Prior to a hiatus due to the COVID-19 pandemic, the show had broadcast live, but has been pre-recorded since its return for episode 100 of Campaign Two. In May 2021, the cast announced that campaign two would end shortly, however, "the Mighty Nein's story wasn't finished". Collider reported that "Campaign 2 has spanned 100 hours of battle, 440 slain villains, and 530 total hours of dice-roll-driven adventuring. And that's not even counting the upcoming 7-hour finale". The finale aired on June 3, 2021; it was the longest episode at just over seven hours.

The episodes of campaign two split by year:

Year	Episodes	Originally released	
Year	Episodes	First released	Last released
2018	1–46	January 11, 2018	December 20, 2018
2019	47–89	January 10, 2019	December 19, 2019
2020	90–120	January 9, 2020	December 17, 2020
2021	121–141	January 14, 2021	June 3, 2021

=== Campaign three (2021–2025) ===
The third campaign premiered on October 21, 2021 with a simulcast live in Cinemark Theatres along with the regular Twitch and YouTube livestream. Critical Role continued to be pre-recorded for the third campaign. Starting with the third campaign, the main campaign of Critical Role did not air new episodes on the last Thursday of every month; instead, other content by the studio aired in its time slot. The campaign is set on the continent of Marquet, which was briefly visited during the Vox Machina campaign. SyFy Wire highlighted that Marquet is "home to massive deserts, mountains, and even a volcano" and that it is "uncharted territory for the series".

The story is set immediately after Exandria Unlimited which took place 10 years after the events of the second campaign. Several cast members reprise their roles from Exandria Unlimited. The party, Bells Hells, gets drawn into the mystery surrounding the Apogee Solstice and Exandria's second moon Ruidus. In August 2024, Mercer started to seed the return of the players as their previous campaign parties within arcs in the third campaign. In October 2024, the cast then reprised their roles as the Mighty Nein while also role-playing as the Bells Hells. In November 2024, the cast also reprised their roles as Vox Machina in a concurrent arc focused on destroying the Malleus Key. The finale aired on February 6, 2025; at over eight and a half hours, it became the longest episode of the series.

The episodes of campaign three split by year:

Year	Episodes	Originally released	
Year	Episodes	First released	Last released
2021	1–8	October 21, 2021	December 16, 2021
2022	9–43	January 6, 2022	December 22, 2022
2023	44–81	January 5, 2023	December 21, 2023
2024	82–117	January 11, 2024	December 12, 2024
2025	118–121	January 2, 2025	February 6, 2025

=== Campaign four (2025–present) ===
The fourth campaign premiered on October 2, 2025 with Brennan Lee Mulligan as game master; it is not set in Exandria, but instead in the new setting of Aramán. Campaign four makes use of the 2024 revision to the 5th Edition ruleset of Dungeons & Dragons. The player cast has been expanded, adding Luis Carazo, Robbie Daymond, Aabria Iyengar, Whitney Moore and Alexander Ward. The earlier primary cast are all present as players, including Mercer. After the opening four sessions of the campaign, Mulligan split the players into three groups: the Soldiers, the Seekers, and the Schemers. The campaign then continued in a West Marches-style structure. (Note: In a West Marches game, a large number of players are split into smaller groups. Although they play at separate tables, the actions of one group of players can have implications for the other groups.)

The episodes of campaign four split by year:

Year	Episodes	Originally released	
Year	Episodes	First released	Last released
2025	1–10	October 2, 2025	December 18, 2025
2026	11–43	January 15, 2026	TBA

== Anthology and related series ==
=== Exandria Unlimited ===
Exandria Unlimited (ExU) is an anthology series and is a spin-off of the main Critical Role series. The first season premiered on June 24, 2021. That season is set in the city of Emon on the continent of Tal'Dorei 30 years after Campaign One and 10 years after Campaign Two. The season's game master is Aabria Iyengar. In March 2022, a two-part adventure sequel, Exandria Unlimited: Kymal, was released.

The second season, titled Exandria Unlimited: Calamity, premiered on May 26, 2022. It follows a group of heroes from the Age of Arcanum – an age 1,500 years before the Critical Role series – who attempt to prevent the Calamity. The third season, titled Exandria Unlimited: Divergence, premiered on February 13, 2025; it focuses on mortals rebuilding the world after the destruction of the Calamity. Brennan Lee Mulligan was the game master of both the Calamity and Divergence seasons.

Title	Episodes	Originally released
Exandria Unlimited	8	June 24 – August 12, 2021
Exandria Unlimited: Kymal	2	March 31 – April 1, 2022
Exandria Unlimited: Calamity	4	May 26 – June 16, 2022
Exandria Unlimited: Divergence	4	February 13 – March 6, 2025

=== The Re-Slayer's Take ===
The Re-Slayer's Take is an all-ages actual play podcast set in Exandria, featuring an adventurer group that was rejected from the monster hunting group, "The Slayer's Take". The cast consists of Jasmine Bhullar, Jasper William Cartwright, Caroline Lux, and Jasmine Chiong, with George Primavera and Nick Williams as Dungeon Masters. The first season premiered on May 20, 2024; the second season premiered on September 10, 2024.

=== Wildemount Wildlings ===
Wildemount Wildlings is a spin-off of the main Critical Role series which premiered on April 3, 2025. The three episode limited series focuses on teenage campers at the Wildemount Wildlings Camp for Adventuring Kids and their two Mighty Nein camp counselors. The players are Eden Riegel, Aleks Le, Brennan Lee Mulligan, and Libe Barer as new characters with Marisha Ray and Ashley Johnson reprising their Campaign 2 characters, Beauregard Lionett and Yasha Nydoorin respectively. The gamemaster is Sam Riegel; while this series is based on the Wildemount Wildlings themed game he runs for his children and their friends, the show is aimed at adults.

== One-shots ==
In addition to their main campaign series, Critical Role has also broadcast many one-shots – short adventures that take place within a single session of play. As of January 2025, seven of these one-shots are listed on the canonical timeline. Most are epilogue episodes for the various campaigns. The Search for Grog and The Search for Bob, however, cover events within the storyline of the last episode of Campaign 1 that required telling outside the time frame of the main show. Other one-shots have only a tangential relationship to the campaigns. These are set in the world of Exandria or feature established canon characters but are not considered canonical themselves. Still other one-shots have no connection at all with the campaigns or the world of Exandria. Some one-shots promote other intellectual properties commissioned by sponsors.

Academics Lisa Horton and David Beard, in the book The Routledge Handbook of Remix Studies and Digital Humanities, explained that Critical Role's one-shots "use pastiche, parody, and other forms of obvious remix", highlighting that Critical Role has "mashed-up Harry Potter with The Breakfast Club and Peter Pan with the Wizard of Oz, and the results are entertaining, but they live and die within a single evening". They argued while these one-shots are fun and "achieve positive fan response", the one-shots are also "unchallenging" and "uncomplicated" as "creative dead ends" in comparison to Critical Role's campaigns.

=== Canon ===
The following one-shots are canonical in Exandria's timeline.

List of canon one-shot episodes
Title	Game master	Cast players	Original release date
"The Search for Grog"	Matthew Mercer	All main cast present	February 22, 2019
Set during the final episode of the series, Vox Machina head to Pandemonium to recover Grog's soul after his use of the Deck of Many Things. This episode was recorded live on January 19, 2019 at The Theatre at the Ace Hotel and premiered on Twitch on February 22, 2019 before being released via YouTube and Twitch VOD the following day. Travis Willingham's character for this one-shot episode—Sir Bertrand Bell—returned in the opening episodes of Campaign 3.
"The Search for Bob"	Matthew Mercer	All main cast present	June 23, 2019
After reuniting Grog's soul with his body, Vox Machina must now find Bob to recover the items he took as they need these items to be able to leave Pandemonium.
"Dalen's Closet"	Matthew Mercer	All main cast present	August 29, 2019
In 813 PD, a year after the defeat of Vecna, the surviving members of Vox Machina reunite with the intent of celebrating Vex and Percy's wedding renewal. However, this destination event is interrupted by Sylas Briarwood who is seeking revenge.
"The Adventures of the Darrington Brigade"	Matthew Mercer	All main cast present	November 29, 2019
In the year 826 P.D, set roughly a decade after the first campaign and a decade before the second campaign, Taryon Darrington recruits a new batch of adventurers for his non-profit Darrington Brigade to join him on a new adventure in Wildemount. This episode was recorded live on November 23, 2019 at the Bass Concert Hall and premiered on Twitch on November 29, 2019, with the YouTube VOD being made available on December 1, 2019.
"The Mighty Nein Reunited Part 1 – Unfinished Business"	Matthew Mercer	All main cast present	November 17, 2022
In 837 PD, six months after the destruction of Lucien, the Mighty Nein are scattered across Wildemount. Uk'otoa's minions steal the last Cloven Crystal after attacking Fjord, Jester, and Kingsley at sea. The Mighty Nein reunite to recover the crystal. In addition to being streamed on Twitch and YouTube, both parts of The Mighty Nein Reunited were simulcast in Cinemark Theatres in both the United States and South America.
"The Mighty Nein Reunited Part 2 – Uk'otoa Unleashed"	Matthew Mercer	All main cast present	December 1, 2022
The Mighty Nein engage in an epic battle against the multi-eyed leviathan Uk'otoa in order to re-seal and imprison him.
"The Mighty Nein Reunion: Echoes of the Solstice"	Matthew Mercer	All main cast present	October 26, 2023
The Mighty Nein must regroup after the events of the Apogee Solstice (Note: Beau and Caleb, as NPCs played by Mercer in Campaign Three Episodes 50 & 51, were among the many people who failed to stop Archmage Ludinus Da'leth from utilizing the solstice in a ritual which resulted in the red moon Ruidus being locked in the sky and arcane powers across Exandria going awry.) in 843 PD and deal with emerging dangers as magical chaos unfolds. They discover that Trent Ikithon has escaped and seeks revenge against Caleb and The Mighty Nein for his imprisonment. This episode was recorded live on October 25, 2023, at the OVO Arena Wembley. It was then broadcast on October 26, 2023 at 7 p.m. PT on Twitch and YouTube; additionally, it was shown in Cinemark Theatres in the United States and in Cineplex Theatres in Canada at 7 p.m. local time the same evening as the premiere.
"Tag Team at the Teeth: The Misty Ascent"	Matthew Mercer	All main cast present	July 8, 2025
The cast play as main Critical Role campaign characters in interconnected one-shots facing a common threat, starting in Sydney, Australia. This episode was recorded live on June 19, 2025 at the ICC Sydney Theatre as part of Critical Role's tenth anniversary live show tour. It was shown in cinemas by Fathom Events at 7 p.m. local time the same evening as recording before premiering on Beacon in July 2025. It then premiered on both YouTube and Twitch on July 31, 2025, with the YouTube VOD being made available on August 4, 2025.
"Tag Team at the Teeth: Beyond the Shroud"	Matthew Mercer	All main cast present	July 15, 2025
The cast play as main Critical Role campaign characters in interconnected one-shots facing a common threat, finishing in Melbourne, Australia. This episode was recorded live on June 25, 2025 at the Rod Laver Arena as part of Critical Role's tenth anniversary live show tour. It was then shown in cinemas by Fathom Events at 7 p.m. local time the same evening as recording before premiering on Beacon in July 2025.
"Oaths and Ash"	Matthew Mercer	All main cast present	August 28, 2025
The first Daggerheart one-shot set in Exandria. The cast reprised their roles as Bells Hells. This episode was recorded live on August 2, 2025 at the Fishers Event Center as part of Critical Role's tenth anniversary live show tour. It was then shown in cinemas by Fathom Events on August 5, 2025 at 7 p.m. local time, before premiering on Beacon.
"Jester and Fjord's Wedding"	Matthew Mercer	All main cast present	November 5, 2025
The next great adventure: the marriage of Jester and Fjord. This episode was recorded live on October 7, 2025 at the Radio City Music Hall as part of Critical Role's tenth anniversary live show tour. It was then shown in cinemas by Fathom Events on October 15, 2025 at 7 p.m. local time, before premiering on Beacon.
"Hubris! A Darrington Brigade One-Shot"	Sam Riegel	All main cast present	April 23, 2026
The cast reprised their roles as the Darrington Brigade led by Sam Riegel as the game master. This episode was livestreamed as part of the Critical Role Foundation and eBay Live's "Shirts Off Sam's Back Charity Stream: An All Night Fight Against Cancer" event.
"Maelstorm Kingdom"	Matthew Mercer	All main cast present	May 29, 2026
The cast reprised their roles as Bells Hells as they venture to an undersea kingdom in a Daggerheart one-shot. This episode was recorded live on May 26, 2026 at the Gas South Arena as part of Critical Role's Echoes of Exandria live show tour, before premiering on Beacon.
"[PROJEKT] Funball"	Matthew Mercer	All main cast present, except Taliesin Jaffe	July 14, 2026
The cast reprised their roles as the Mighty Nein in an adventure to save Caleb who has become a corrupted maze master after his and Essek's experimentation in the Folding Halls of Halas went gone wrong. This episode was recorded live on July 6, 2026 at the Uber Arena as part of Critical Role's Echoes of Exandria live show tour, before premiering on Beacon.
"Darktow"	Matthew Mercer	All main cast present	July 21, 2026
The cast will reprise their roles as the Mighty Nein in an adventure to help Kingsley who is attempting to claim the throne of Darktow. This episode was recorded live on July 12, 2026 at Edinburgh Castle as part of Critical Role's Echoes of Exandria live show tour, before premiering on Beacon.
"Red Moon Requiem"	Matthew Mercer	All main cast present	November 3, 2026
The cast reprised their roles as Vox Machina in an adventure to protect a recently reborn deity who has been taken to the red moon, Ruidus. This episode was recorded live on October 26, 2026 at The O2 Arena as part of Critical Role's Echoes of Exandria live show tour, before premiering on Beacon.
"Grog's Holiday Adventure!"	Travis Willingham	All main cast present	TBA
The cast will reprise their roles as Vox Machina in adventure led by Travis Willingham as the game master. This episode is scheduled to record live on December 3, 2026 at the Dickies Arena as part of Critical Role's Echoes of Exandria live show tour.

=== Shared world or characters ===
These one-shots are set within the world of Exandria or feature established characters from the main campaigns. They are not, however, deemed canonical—having no impact on the main storyline.

List of episodes within Exandria
Title	Game master	Cast players	Guest players	Original release date	RPG system
"Critical Role Q&A and Battle Royale!"	Matthew Mercer	Marisha Ray, Travis Willingham	Will Friedle, Wendy Sullivan Green, Mary Elizabeth McGlynn	February 25, 2016	D&D
In the first half, the cast and guests answer questions sent in by the audience. In the second half, they use their Vox Machina characters in a Battle Royale-style player versus player game.
"Critical Role Q&A and Battle Royale: Take II"	Matthew Mercer	Taliesin Jaffe, Ashley Johnson, Liam O'Brien, Marisha Ray	–	May 26, 2016	D&D
In the first half, the cast answer questions sent in by the audience. In the second half, they use their Vox Machina characters in a Battle Royale-style player versus player game.
"The Return of Liam"	Liam O'Brien	Travis Willingham, Sam Riegel, Laura Bailey	Mary Elizabeth McGlynn, Ashly Burch	September 1, 2016	D&D
Also titled as: "The Screw Job".
"Bar Room Blitz"	Sam Riegel	Liam O'Brien	Eric Bauza, Ashly Burch, Brian Wayne Foster, Mary Elizbeth McGlynn	August 31, 2017	D&D
A group of misfits find themselves swept up in a bar room brawl in a tavern on the outskirts of Jorenn Village near the Umbra Hills. This episode was pulled from Critical Role's official channels in July 2023.
"Grog's One-shot"	Travis Willingham	Laura Bailey, Taliesin Jaffe, Liam O'Brien, Sam Riegel	–	November 2, 2017	D&D
Grog runs some of the members of Vox Machina through a game of "Bunions and Flagons" (an in-world version of Dungeons & Dragons).
"Marisha's Honey Heist"	Marisha Ray	Sam Riegel, Matthew Mercer, Taliesin Jaffe, Liam O'Brien	Brian W. Foster	November 9, 2017	Honey Heist
Titled on Geek and Sundry as Trinket's Honey Heist. Uses the one-page RPG system called Honey Heist. This episode was pulled from Critical Role's official channels in July 2023.
"Epic Level Battle Royale One-shot"	Matthew Mercer	Taliesin Jaffe, Liam O'Brien, Marisha Ray, Sam Riegel, Travis Willingham	–	December 7, 2017	D&D
The cast use their Vox Machina characters at level 20 in a Battle Royale-style player versus player game.
"Honey Heist 2: Electric Beargaloo"	Marisha Ray	Sam Riegel, Matthew Mercer, Taliesin Jaffe, Liam O'Brien	Brian W. Foster	August 10, 2018	Honey Heist
Uses the one-page RPG system called Honey Heist. This episode was pulled from Critical Role's official channels in July 2023.
"Liam's One-shot: The Song of the Lorelei"	Liam O'Brien	Laura Bailey, Sam Riegel, Travis Willingham	Erica Luttrell, TJ Storm	August 31, 2018	D&D
A werewolf adventure in Wildemount.
"Honey Heist 3: Tova's Honeys"	Marisha Ray	Laura Bailey	Krystina Arielle, Dani Carr, Mary Elizabeth McGlynn, ND Stevenson, Brittany Walloch-Key	November 23, 2018	Honey Heist
Uses the one-page RPG system called Honey Heist.
"Stephen Colbert's D&D Adventure"	Matthew Mercer	–	Stephen Colbert	May 23, 2019	D&D
A Red Nose Day one-shot where Mercer runs a special one-on-one D&D adventure for Stephen Colbert. Colbert plays Capo, a half-elven bard, who sets out to solve mystery on the Menagerie Coast in Wildemount.
"Vox Machina x Mighty Nein"	Matthew Mercer	All main cast present	–	June 18, 2021	D&D
A 4x4 Battle Royale between Vox Machina (represented by Pike, Scanlan, Vax'ildan, and Percy) and the Mighty Nein (represented by Beauregard, Jester, Fjord and Mollymauk). The cast reprised their characters at level 15. This episode was a stretch goal reward from Critical Role's 2019 Kickstarter.
"Guest Battle Royale"	Sam Riegel	–	Anjali Bhimani, Darin De Paul, Will Friedle, Sumalee Montano, ND Stevenson	January 27, 2022	D&D
Five warriors are pulled from different points of Exandria's timeline to fight on Garyon Garrington's Plunder Games – an alternate reality TV show. Various guests will reprise their characters in this Battle Royale-style player versus player game: Darin De Paul as Sprigg, Will Friedle as Kashaw Vesh, and ND Stevenson as Tova from Campaign One, Sumalee Montano as Nila from Campaign Two, and Anjali Bhimani as Fy'ra Rai from Exandria Unlimited. This one-shot episode was a stretch goal reward from Critical Role's 2019 Kickstarter.
"Dignity: An Adventure with Stephen Colbert"	Matthew Mercer	Ashley Johnson, Marisha Ray, Sam Riegel	Stephen Colbert	April 28, 2022	D&D
A Red Nose Day one-shot where Mercer runs a D&D adventure for Stephen Colbert; Colbert plays as Lucky Jack, a human fighter, seeking his temple's reliquary Dignity which was stolen during an attack on his temple which left his mentor dead. He was joined by several Critical Role cast members reprising their Mighty Nein roles at level 5. Red Nose Day donors had the ability to choose various aspects of the game between March 23 to April 1. This Red Nose Day campaign won two 2022 Shorty Impact Awards – the Gold Honor in "Best Fundraising Campaign" and the Audience Honor in "Best Influencer & Celebrity Partnership".
"A Familiar Problem: Sprinkle's Incredible Journey"	Marisha Ray	Laura Bailey, Matthew Mercer, Travis Willingham	Heidi N Closet, Isabella Roland	June 23, 2022	A Familiar Problem
A one-shot following a group of animal familiars in Exandria. It showcased A Familiar Problem, the new one-page RPG created by Marisha Ray and Grant Howitt.
"Red Nose Day 2023 One-Shot: Choose Their Adventure… Again!"	Matthew Mercer	Sam Riegel, Laura Bailey, Taliesin Jaffe	Tony Hale, Sam Richardson	November 28, 2023	D&D
A Red Nose Day one-shot where Mercer runs a D&D adventure for Tony Hale and Sam Richardson who are joined by several Critical Role cast members. The adventure was set in the Shattered Teeth. Red Nose Day donors had the ability to choose various aspects of the game. While O'Brien was originally announced as a player, he later withdrew and was replaced by Riegel.
"Critical Role Foundation Presents: Freaky Thursday"	Matthew Mercer	All main cast present	–	January 30, 2025	D&D
A live non-canon one-shot featuring the Bells Hells who are pulled from Exandria by two Elemental Royals to undergo a series of challenges. This charity fundraiser benefited the California Community Foundation (Wildfire Recovery Fund), the Latino Community Foundation and the LA Fire Department Foundation following the January 2025 Southern California wildfires. Donors had ability to choose various aspects of the game ahead of time (such as monsters and map hazards) and during the game (such as player character boons and banes).
"Total Party Kill: Chicago Live 2025"	Matthew Mercer	All main cast present	Robbie Daymond	April 24, 2025	D&D
The audience voted on which main Critical Role campaign characters the cast played in this one-shot. This episode was recorded live on April 10, 2025 at the Wintrust Arena as part of Critical Role's tenth anniversary live show tour. It then aired on Beacon later that month.
"The Rings of Power: A Middle-earth One-Shot"	Liam O'Brien	Sam Riegel, Travis Willingham	Maxim Baldry, Benjamin Walker	November 15, 2026	TBA
Alcohol-induced misuse of the Deck of Infinite Possibilities lands Grog Strongjaw and Scanlan Shorthalt in Middle-earth where they meet two urruks, Bubba (Walker) and Bertie (Baldry), "who are rebelling against Sauron". They eventually find a return portal to Exandria, with Bubba and Bertie joining them. Sponsored by The Lord of the Rings: The Rings of Power, and streamed live from TwitchCon 2026.
"Battle of the Bards"	Matthew Mercer	Ashley Johnson, Sam Riegel	Wayne Brady, K.Flay, Tom Morello, Blake Roman, Thot Squad	November 17, 2026	TBA
A live charity one-shot with donations to the Critical Role Foundation affecting the game, in which Scanlan Shorthalt holds a bard competition to "determine the next greatest entertainer in Exandria".

=== Promotional ===
These one-shots were made as promotions for other properties or groups.

List of promotional episodes
Title	Game master	Cast players	Guest players	Original release date	RPG system
"Shadow of War Part 1"	Matthew Mercer	Laura Bailey, Sam Riegel, Travis Willingham	Darin De Paul	October 3, 2017	D&D
First part of a sponsored one-shot to promote Middle-earth: Shadow of War.
"Shadow of War Part 2"	Matthew Mercer	Laura Bailey, Sam Riegel, Travis Willingham	Darin De Paul	October 9, 2017	D&D
Second part of a sponsored one-shot to promote Middle-earth: Shadow of War.
"Hearthstone One-shot"	Matthew Mercer	Liam O'Brien, Travis Willingham, Laura Bailey, Taliesin Jaffe	Jennifer Hale	November 30, 2017	D&D
Sponsored one-shot for the Hearthstone game. Titled on Geek & Sundry as Kobolds, Catacombs and Dragons (Oh My!)
"Call of Cthulhu: Shadow of the Crystal Palace"	Taliesin Jaffe	Marisha Ray, Travis Willingham, and Liam O'Brien	Erika Ishii, Ashly Burch, and Phil LaMarr	July 29, 2019	Call of Cthulhu
Promotional one-shot for Call of Cthulhu.
"Feast of Legends"	Sam Riegel	Marisha Ray, Matthew Mercer, and Liam O'Brien	Ify Nwadiwe	October 3, 2019	Feast of Legends
Promotional one-shot for Wendy's RPG system Feast of Legends. This episode was pulled after airing.
"Doom Eternal One-Shot"	Matthew Mercer	Sam Riegel, Laura Bailey, Taliesin Jaffe	Anjali Bhimani, Jasmine Bhullar	March 16, 2020	D&D
Game Master Matthew Mercer leads a horde of demons on an adventure based on the first-person shooter DOOM Eternal.
"Diablo One-Shot"	Matthew Mercer	Laura Bailey, Liam O'Brien, Marisha Ray	Mica Burton, Carlos Luna	February 20, 2021	Homebrew
A Diablo themed one-shot for BlizzConline, the virtual replacement for BlizzCon, was aired on the main Blizzard Entertainment streaming channel. The game is set in the fictional location of Sanctuary. The VOD was then made available on Critical Role's YouTube channel.
"Elder Scrolls Online: Blackwood Part 1 – Death & Taxes"	Matthew Mercer	Laura Bailey, Sam Riegel, Taliesin Jaffe	Aabria Iyengar, Michelle Nguyen Bradley	May 24, 2021	D&D
The first Elder Scrolls Online: Blackwood themed one-shot sponsored by Bethesda Softworks and ZeniMax Online Studios.
"Elder Scrolls Online: Blackwood Part 2 – A Faulty Foundation"	Marisha Ray	Laura Bailey, Sam Riegel, Taliesin Jaffe	Aabria Iyengar, Michelle Nguyen Bradley	August 19, 2021	D&D
The second Elder Scrolls Online: Blackwood themed one-shot sponsored by Bethesda Softworks and ZeniMax Online Studios.
"Elder Scrolls Online: Blackwood Part 3 – The Golden Goose"	Liam O'Brien	Laura Bailey, Sam Riegel, Taliesin Jaffe	Aabria Iyengar, Michelle Nguyen Bradley	October 28, 2021	D&D
The third Elder Scrolls Online: Blackwood themed one-shot sponsored by Bethesda Softworks and ZeniMax Online Studios.
"Elden Ring One-Shot: O Ye of Little Faith"	Matthew Mercer	Marisha Ray, Sam Riegel	Krystina Arielle, Brennan Lee Mulligan, Alexander Ward	March 1, 2022	D&D
An Elden Ring themed one-shot sponsored by Bandai Namco Entertainment. Mercer used a modified version of the D&D ruleset.
"Tiny Tina's Wonderlands One-Shot"	Ashly Burch	Laura Bailey, Ashley Johnson, Travis Willingham	Robbie Daymond, Ify Nwadiwe	March 28, 2022	Bunkers & Badasses
A Tiny Tina's Wonderlands themed one-shot sponsored by 2K Games.
"Generation Nord"	Sam Riegel	Laura Bailey, Liam O'Brien	Aimee Carrero, Christian Navarro, Lou Wilson	November 8, 2022	8-Bit
A 'hacking'-themed one-shot set in the '90s sponsored by NordVPN, with Matthew Lillard as a special guest.
"The Legend of Zelda One-Shot: Lookout, Here We Come!"	Matthew Mercer	Liam O'Brien, Marisha Ray	Robbie Daymond, Omar Najam, Emily Axford	May 30, 2023	PbtA
The Legend of Zelda: Tears of the Kingdom themed one-shot set in the world of Hyrule, sponsored by Nintendo of America.
"Mortal Kombat 1 One-Shot: Sindel Vs. The Realms"	Marisha Ray	Sam Riegel, Travis Willingham	Noshir Dalal, Gina Darling	September 19, 2023	Till The Last Gasp
Mortal Kombat 1 themed one-shot, sponsored by WB Games.
"Persona 5 Tactica One-Shot"	Liam O'Brien	Matthew Mercer	Robbie Daymond, Xanthe Huynh, Krystina Arielle, Jared Goldstein	November 17, 2023	D&D
Persona 5 Tactica themed one-shot, sponsored by Atlus West.
"Assassin's Creed Shadows One-Shot"	Matthew Mercer	Liam O'Brien	Emily Piggford, Robbie Daymond, Peter Shinkoda	January 14, 2025	Homebrew
Assassin's Creed Shadows themed one-shot, sponsored by Ubisoft.
"Delve into Dawnshore"	Matthew Mercer	Marisha Ray, Travis Willingham	Anjali Bhimani, SungWon Cho, Whitney Moore	February 18, 2025	Homebrew
Avowed themed one-shot, sponsored by Xbox Game Studios.
"Suikoden One-Shot"	Matthew Mercer	Taliesin Jaffe, Ashley Johnson	Arin Hanson, Zachary Renauldo, Zeno Robinson	March 11, 2025	Homebrew
Suikoden themed one-shot set in Muse City in the Dunan Republic, sponsored by Konami.
"The Elder Scrolls Online One-Shot"	Liam O'Brien	Laura Bailey, Matthew Mercer	Evan Michael Lee, Jasmine Bhullar, Luis Carazo	April 29, 2025	D&D
A one-shot set in the Second Era of Elder Scrolls Online, sponsored by Bethesda.
"Thank Goodness it's Thursday!"	Matthew Mercer	Ashley Johnson	Will Friedle, Staci Keanan, Christine Lakin, Rider Strong, Jodie Sweetin	September 18, 2025	Daggerheart
A 90s-themed Daggerheart charity one-shot presented by the Critical Role Foundation, supporting the National Center for Women & Information Technology, and sponsored by eBay Live.
"Dispatch One-Shot"	Jasmine Bhullar	Laura Bailey, Matthew Mercer, Travis Willingham	Erin Yvette	October 30, 2025	Daggerheart
A Daggerheart one-shot set in the world of Dispatch, sponsored by AdHoc Studio.

=== Daggerheart beta ===
These are one-shots which feature pre-release versions of the Daggerheart system published by Darrington Press, the tabletop game imprint for Critical Role Productions. Cheryl Teh of Business Insider noted that the Critical Role cast "appears to be embracing, once again, the funhouse chaos of its early-day Twitch streams" by returning to the livestream format for the Daggerheart episodes. Tara McCauley of The Escapist described the three episodes featuring The Menagerie adventuring party as a "one-shot-turned-short-campaign" which allowed Critical Role to "demonstrate Daggerheart and its open beta evolution with their signature actual play antics".

List of Daggerheart one-shot episodes
Title	Game master	Cast players	Guest players	Original release date
"Critical Role plays Daggerheart"	Matthew Mercer	All main cast present	–	March 12, 2024
A group of adventurers called The Menagerie, in the realm of Lochspire, investigate the corruption within the Velvet Grove and cleansed Boko, the guardian of the Grove.
"The Menagerie Returns!"	Matthew Mercer	All main cast present	–	May 14, 2024
The Menagerie trace the source of the corruption to the town of Lolvale and the Kroatona family. While infiltrating a hideout, the party battled members of the Kroatona family and were forced to flee into the sewers when backup was called. However, Bunnie and Sweetpea were captured during this escape.
"Ménagerie a Trois"	Matthew Mercer	All main cast present	–	June 13, 2024
During Mortimer Kroatona's interrogation, Sweetpea and Bunnie manage to escape and regroup with the rest of the Menagerie. The party investigate nearby mines which were closed by the local baron on behalf of the Kroatona family and eliminate a source of corruption there.
"A Daggerheart Critmas Story LIVE"	Matthew Mercer	All main cast present	–	December 19, 2024
This episode was recorded live on December 7, 2024 at the Freedom Mortgage Pavilion and premiered on Twitch, YouTube, and Beacon on December 19, 2024, with the YouTube VOD being made available on December 23, 2024.

=== Other ===
These one-shots do not fit into the above categories—they are not set within Exandria, they are not promotional, nor do they showcase pre-release versions of Daggerheart.

List of other episodes
Title	Game master	Cast players	Guest players	Original release date	RPG system
"Critical Role at GameSpot livestream"	Matthew Mercer	Travis Willingham, Laura Bailey, Marisha Ray	Alexa Ray Corriea, Danny O'Dwyer	March 22, 2016	D&D
Although not canon, this game features an early version of Jester – Laura Bailey's character for Campaign two.
"To The Poop! - The Goblins"	Matthew Mercer	Taliesin Jaffe, Marisha Ray	Ashly Burch, Phil LaMarr, Ivan Van Norman	April 18, 2016	Pathfinder
A one-shot using the Pathfinder Roleplaying Game system.
"Deadlands One-Shot for MDA Charity!"	Matthew Mercer	Marisha Ray, Liam O'Brien, Laura Bailey, Travis Willingham	–	June 25, 2016	Deadlands Reloaded
A charity one-shot for the Muscular Dystrophy Association.
"Critical Role EXTRA – Liam's Quest!"	Liam O'Brien	Laura Bailey, Taliesin Jaffe, Sam Riegel, Travis Willingham	–	June 30, 2016	D&D
The cast, playing as themselves, start in a mundane voice acting session when extraordinary events leave them struggling to survive in a Lovecraftian horror adventure based on popular movies and video games.
"Liam's Quest: Full Circle"	Liam O'Brien	All main cast present	–	April 20, 2017	D&D
Sequel to "Critical Role EXTRA – Liam's Quest!"
"Thursday by Night Part 1"	Taliesin Jaffe	Laura Bailey, Matthew Mercer, Liam O'Brien, Marisha Ray, Sam Riegel, Travis Willingham	–	October 19, 2017	Vampire: The Masquerade
Taliesin acts as a Game Master for the first time, leading the cast (playing as themselves) through a Vampire: The Masquerade game set in the Geek & Sundry offices.
"Thursday by Night Part 2"	Taliesin Jaffe	Laura Bailey, Liam O'Brien, Sam Riegel, Travis Willingham	–	October 26, 2017	Vampire: The Masquerade
The Vampire: The Masquerade campaign concludes as the surviving cast members find their way through the outside world.
"Sam's One-shot"	Sam Riegel	–	H. Michael Croner, Yuri Lowenthal, Lee Knox Ostertag, ND Stevenson, Amy Vorpahl, Stefanie Woodburn	November 16, 2017	D&D
Titled on Geek & Sundry as Once Upon a Fairytale Cruise.
"Sam Riegel's Crash Pandas One-shot"	Sam Riegel	Matthew Mercer, Marisha Ray, Liam O'Brien, Laura Bailey, Travis Willingham	Blair Herter	September 21, 2018	Crash Pandas
Also titled: Crash Panda's Too Trashed Too Curious
"Critical Role and the Club of Misfits"	Laura Bailey	Travis Willingham, Taliesin Jaffe, Liam O'Brien, Sam Riegel	Brian W. Foster	October 25, 2018	D&D
At the magical school of Shmogwarts, five students escape detention. This episode was pulled from Critical Role's official channels in July 2023.
"The Night Before Critmas"	Liam O'Brien	Taliesin Jaffe, Ashley Johnson, Matthew Mercer, Marisha Ray, Sam Riegel, Travis Willingham	Julie Nathanson	December 21, 2018	D&D
A one-shot following elves in Santa's Village in the North Pole.
"Tails of Equestria"	Mara Holmes	Ashley Johnson, Liam O'Brien	Markeia McCarty, Julie Nathanson, Roger Craig Smith	May 31, 2019	My Little Pony: Tails of Equestria
Mara Holmes, Dungeon Master of the web series High Rollers, acts as Game Master for a special My Little Pony: Tails of Equestria adventure.
"Cinderbrush: A Monsterhearts Story"	Matthew Mercer	Ashley Johnson, Taliesin Jaffe	Erika Ishii, Ally Beardsley	February 14, 2020	Monsterhearts
Four teenagers take on the horrors of high school – hormones, social cliques, teen angst and supernatural monsters.
"The Nautilus Ark: A Johnson Corp Odyssey"	Ashley Johnson	Laura Bailey, Taliesin Jaffe, Liam O'Brien, Marisha Ray, Travis Willingham	–	September 9, 2021	Homebrew
A science fiction survival horror story. The homebrew rule system uses elements from the games Mothership by Tuesday Knight Games and Alien RPG by Free League. This episode was a stretch goal reward from Critical Role's 2019 Kickstarter.
