= Critical Role campaign three =

Campaign of the web series Critical Role

- Campaign poster art by Matteo Scalera and Moreno Dinisio
- No. of episodes: 121

Release
- Original network: Twitch; YouTube; Beacon (Note: From 2024.)
- Original release: October 21, 2021 – February 6, 2025

Season chronology
- ← Previous; Campaign two Next → Campaign four

The third campaign of the Dungeons & Dragons web series Critical Role premiered on October 21, 2021, and concluded on February 6, 2025; it is set after the conclusion of the second campaign and Exandria Unlimited. The series stars Marisha Ray, Ashley Johnson, Laura Bailey, Travis Willingham, Liam O'Brien, Taliesin Jaffe, and Sam Riegel as the players with Matthew Mercer as the Dungeon Master. Campaign three aired each Thursday at 7 p.m. PT on Critical Role Productions' Twitch and YouTube channels and the Beacon streaming service except for the last Thursday of each month.

The campaign is an actual play which follows the Bells Hells, a party of adventurers who met on the continent of Marquet. The campaign begins two months before the Apogee Solstice, a celestial event which influences the ley lines of Exandria and magnifies magical abilities. The party gets drawn into the mystery surrounding Exandria's second moon Ruidus and the superstitions around the Ruidusborn, people born during spontaneous flares of the red moon. They eventually discover that the gods crafted Ruidus to imprison an ancient evil known as Predathos and that the Ruby Vanguard – founded and led by Martinet Ludinus Da'leth – seek to free this entity during the Apogee Solstice. The Bells Hells attempted to prevent this by targeting the Malleus Keys, magical devices built by the Ruby Vanguard to aid their ritual. The party interferes with the ritual preventing the release. Afterwards, Ruidus is locked in place over the Hellcatch Valley Malleus Key which allows people to travel between the moon and Exandria. The Exandrian Accord brought together nations and factions from across the world to form a military alliance in opposition to the forces of Ruidus; Bells Hells, along with the adventuring parties Vox Machina and Mighty Nein, lend their aid as coordinated strike teams against various Ruidian targets.

== Cast ==
=== Main ===
Campaign 3 has maintained the previous Campaign 2 main cast members, consisting of seven players and the Dungeon Master. The characters met in the city of Jrusar and later named their adventuring party the Bells Hells after a fallen member. Some of the cast played as mortal incarnations of the Prime Deities during the Downfall special. During the later part of the campaign, the cast also reprised as their Vox Machina and Mighty Nein characters from Critical Role's previous campaigns.

- Marisha Ray as:
  - Laudna, a human (Hollow One) warlock/sorcerer who was killed during the massacre that began the Whitestone Rebellion in 810 PD and was resurrected by necromantic magic; she has since occasionally heard the voice of the deceased Delilah Briarwood. She wandered for decades before meeting Imogen in the Taloned Highlands; the two later travelled to Jrusar in 843 PD. Laudna was killed by Otohan Thull of the Ruby Vanguard during a battle at the Paragon's Call fortress which led the Bells Hells to go on a successful quest to magically resurrect her. Later in the campaign, Laudna forms a romantic relationship with Imogen.
  - Beauregard "Beau" Lionett, a human monk working for the Order of the Cobalt Soul and a member of The Mighty Nein.
  - Keyleth of the Air Ashari, a half-elf druid and a member of Vox Machina.
- Ashley Johnson as:
  - Fearne Calloway, a Ruidusborn faun (Note: Fearne's mother is a faun and her father is an elf-like fey politician. Fearne was born on Exandria under a Ruidus flare before her parents returned to the Feywild.) druid/rogue who travelled to the Material Plane from the Feywild to explore and find her parents. She can summon a wildfire spirit monkey named Little Mister. She met Orym and Dorian, along with other adventurers, in Emon and they formed the group known as the Crown Keepers. In the summer of 843 PD, she journeyed to Jrusar with Orym and Dorian to support Orym's mission.
  - Trist, a human paladin/cleric who is the mortal incarnation of the Everlight and infiltrates Aeor during the Calamity.
  - Yasha Nydoorin, an aasimar barbarian and a member of The Mighty Nein.
  - Pike Trickfoot, gnome cleric of the Everlight and a member of Vox Machina.
- Laura Bailey as:
  - Imogen Temult, a Ruidusborn human sorcerer with psionic magic who has reoccurring dreams of a red storm. She and her companion Laudna travelled to Jrusar to investigate the origins of her psionic abilities and Laudna's necromantic abilities. Her mother, Liliana Temult, left when she was a child; the party's investigation into Ruidius leads them to discover that she and Liliana are Exaltant Ruidusborn who get power from the red moon. Liliana, as a general in the Ruby Vanguard, is working with the powerful elven archmage Ludinus Da'leth toward mysterious ends involving Ruidus. During the campaign, Imogen forms a romantic relationship with Laudna.
  - Emhira, a human warlock who is the mortal incarnation of the Raven Queen and infiltrates Aeor during the Calamity.
  - Jester Lavorre, a tiefling cleric who follows an obscure entity known as the Traveler and a member of The Mighty Nein.
  - Vex'ahlia "Vex" de Rolo, a half-elf ranger/rogue and a member of Vox Machina.
- Travis Willingham as:
  - Sir Bertrand Bell, a human fighter who travelled with Vox Machina to the plane of Pandemonium in 812 PD and in the following decades, exaggerated his accomplishments. After an encounter with animated furniture in Jrusar, he introduced the group to Lord Ariks Eshteross. When he was separated from the party one evening, the dwarf Dugger ambushed and killed him – the party avenges him and later names the group the Bells Hells in his honor.
  - Chetney Pock O'Pea, a gnome blood hunter (Note: Blood hunter is a homebrew class developed by Mercer.)/rogue (Note: See Chetney's character card on screen in Episode 22.) who is also a woodworking artisan. He left Uthodurn in search of aid for his lycanthropy. He approaches the Bells Hells to ask for help searching for a man; following this, he joins the group as a full member.
  - Fjord Stone, a half-orc warlock/paladin of the Wildmother and a member of The Mighty Nein.
  - Grog Strongjaw, a goliath barbarian/fighter and a member of Vox Machina.
- Liam O'Brien as:
  - Orym of the Air Ashari, a halfling fighter on a mission from Keyleth of the Air Ashari to investigate an attack in Marquet. This attack was similar to an attack on Keyleth in 837 PD which left Orym's husband Will dead. He travelled to Jrusar with other members of the Crown Keepers.
  - Caleb Widogast, a human wizard and a member of The Mighty Nein.
  - Lieve'tel Toluse, an elf cleric of The Matron of Ravens
  - Vax'ildan, a half-elf rogue/paladin/druid, former member of Vox Machina and Champion of Ravens
- Matthew Mercer as:
  - The Dungeon Master who organizes the gameplay, describes what effects the player characters' actions have on the world and narrative, and plays the non-player characters (NPCs).
  - Dariax Zaveon, a dwarf sorcerer/bard and member of the Crown Keepers.
- Taliesin Jaffe as:
  - Ashton Greymoore, (Note: Preferred pronouns: he/they) an earth genasi barbarian who attacked Jiana Hexum's home in Jrusar with a group called the Nobodies and was gravely injured; they were abandoned by the group and have been paying off their debt to Hexum since. On a job, they discovered Fresh Cut Grass and helped the automaton bury their companions. They later convince the Bells Hells to take a job from Hexum which pays off their debt to her.
  - Asha, a wolf wildshaped into an elven monk who is the mortal incarnation of the Wildmother and infiltrates Aeor during the Calamity.
  - Caduceus Clay, a firbolg cleric of the Wildmother and a member of The Mighty Nein.
  - Percival "Percy" de Rolo, a human gunslinger and a member of Vox Machina.
- Sam Riegel as:
  - Fresh Cut Grass (FCG), an automaton cleric with ancient Aeorian design who was reassembled by the tinkerer Dancer in 838 PD. They are the surviving member of the party known as the Division of Public Benefit. They initially believe that they were built by Dancer but the party learns FCG was a pre-Divergence Harmonious Aeormaton named Faithful Care-Giver. While they don't have memories of this time period, FCG fears that they participated in an assassination attempt known as the Care and the Culling after learning that they repressed memories of killing the other members of the Division of Public Benefit during a panic attack. On the Ruidus scouting mission, FCG sacrifices himself to kill Otohan Thull and save Bells Hells so they can escape the moon. Following FCG's in-game death in April 2024, Riegel took a leave of absence from the show to receive treatment for cancer before returning to the show with a new character in June 2024.
  - Braius Doomseed, a minotaur paladin/bard who is a follower of Asmodeus. After infiltrating the Ruby Vanguard on a mission to kill Ludinus Da'leth, he joins Bells Hells in the ruins of Aeor as the party is also tracking Ludinus.
  - Veth Brenatto, a halfling rogue and a member of The Mighty Nein.
  - Scanlan Shorthalt, a gnome bard and a member of Vox Machina.

=== Guests ===
Additionally, the following guests have made appearances:

- Robbie Daymond as:
  - Dorian Storm, an air genasi bard who travelled to Jrusar with Orym and Fearne and helped form the Bells Hells. He later leaves the group to help smuggle his brother out of Marquet and rejoins the other members of the Crown Keepers in Tal'Dorei.
  - Cerkonos of the Fire Ashari, The Flamespeaker of his people.
- Erika Ishii as Yu Suffiad, (Note: They originally presented themselves as an elf named Dusk.) a changeling warlock/paladin who works for Sorrowlord Zathuda, Grove Captain of the Unseelie Court. They were tasked with hunting down Fearne's parents and recovering an object which they stole.
- Christian Navarro as F.R.I.D.A. (Far Ranging Integrated Defense Aeormaton), an automaton fighter/rogue/cleric with ancient Aeorian design who is a companion of Deanna. Similar to FCG, they were brought back to life by a mysterious figure known as "D".
- Aabria Iyengar as:
  - Deanna Leimert, a gnome cleric of the Dawnfather. She and Chetney are exes; after they broke up, Deanna married, had a family and died. Her husband went on a quest and found a cleric who brought Deanna back to life two hundred years later.
  - The Dungeon Master of the Crown Keepers, a party of adventurers who originally appeared in Exandria Unlimited.
- Aimee Carrero as:
  - Deni$e Bembachula, a dwarf barbarian/rogue from Tal'Dorei who was mysteriously teleported to Issylra during the Apogee Solstice at the same moment that she found her ex-fiancé Dariax, a character played by Mercer in Exandria Unlimited. After discovering that Dariax is desolate in Westruun, she acquires transportation there.
  - Opal, a human warlock and member of the Crown Keepers. During Exandria Unlimited, Opal donned the Spider Queen's Vestige of Divergence, the Circlet of Barbed Vision, and has slowly become corrupted by the evil goddess.
- Utkarsh Ambudkar as Bor'Dor Dog'Son, a half-elf sorcerer of the Ruby Vanguard who was teleported to Issylra during the Apogee Solstice near the other party members. He murdered a farmer, burned his body, and stole his clothes to delude the party into thinking he is a simple sheep farmer. After his lies are discovered, he is killed by Laudna in revenge.
- Emily Axford as Prism Grimpoppy, a shadar-kai wizard originally from the Shadowfell who was an apprentice mage at the Cobalt Soul. She was tasked by the Cobalt Soul to do a survey on experiences during the Apogee Solstice; the Cobalt Soul knew she would be transported. She also has a raven familiar named Mother in honor of the Matron of Ravens. After travelling with members of Bells Hells for a time, she decides not to return to the Cobalt Soul and steal books for Bells Hells.
- Anjali Bhimani as Fy'ra Rai, a fire genasi monk who worships the Wildmother and is a member of the Crown Keepers. During Exandria Unlimited: Kymal, she discovers her twin sister works for the Nameless Ones who are enemies of the Crown Keepers.
- Erica Lindbeck as Morrighan Ferus, a lagomore paladin of the Raven Queen who was originally from the Feywild. She joined the Crown Keepers during a heist in Exandria Unlimited: Kymal.
- Brennan Lee Mulligan as the Dungeon Master for the Downfall arc of the campaign. This special focuses on the divine figures who brought down Aeor during the Calamity.
- Noshir Dalal as The Emissary, an earth genasi barbarian who is the Lawbearer's Herald and infiltrates Aeor during the Calamity.
- Nick Marini as Ayden, a human barbarian/druid/cleric/paladin who is the mortal incarnation of the Dawnfather and infiltrates Aeor during the Calamity.
- Abubakar Salim as S.I.L.A.H.A., an aeormaton sorcerer/warlock who is the mortal incarnation of the Arch Heart and infiltrates Aeor during the Calamity. The Bells Hells are later pulled into the Arch Heart's domain where the deity proposes to the party that they free Predathos under the control of a vessel which will force the pantheon to flee Exandria. During this sequence, Salim acts as both the deity and the Dungeon Master.

== Background ==
The story takes place roughly 10 years after the events of the second campaign, shortly after the events of the limited series Exandria Unlimited. It is set on the continent of Marquet, which was briefly visited during the Vox Machina campaign. SyFy Wire highlighted that Marquet is "home to massive deserts, mountains, and even a volcano" and that it is "uncharted territory for the series".

Multiple characters in this campaign are returning characters. Dorian, Orym, and Fearne premiered in Exandria Unlimited while Bertrand premiered in the one-shot "Search For Grog". Mercer noted that both Johnson and O'Brien brought character concepts they were toying with for Campaign 3 over to Exandria Unlimited, where they had the chance to develop them with Aabria Iyengar. There was no expectation to carry the characters over to Campaign 3, but the two players enjoyed the characters so much, they decided to keep using them moving forward. Daymond was brought in a special guest to help carry them forward over into Campaign 3. Willingham's second character, Chetney, was inspired by a character he had previously played in the non-canon one-shot "The Night Before Critmas". Additionally, Mercer has brought back several player characters from previous campaigns as NPCs such as Vox Machina's Keyleth and Pike and The Mighty Nein's Caleb and Beau.

== Production and format ==
The format is largely unchanged from the second campaign, with videos of the cast and any battlemaps presented in 3-5-hour episodes. Technical changes introduced during the second campaign such as subtitles, character information and pre-recording were maintained. Prior to the COVID-19 pandemic, the show had broadcast live, but has been pre-recorded since Campaign Two Episode 100. A new set, designed by professional amusement park designers Shaun Ellis and Polly Hodges, was built for the third campaign. The cast are no longer divided into socially distanced individual tables, but returned instead to a common table as had been the case prior to the pandemic. The campaign featured "enhanced set designs, music, lighting and effects, along with improved sound (each actor will have an individual mic)."

The show aired each Thursday at 19:00 PT on Critical Role's Twitch and YouTube channels. In a change from the previous campaign, campaign three of Critical Role did not air new episodes on the last Thursday of every month; instead, other content by the studio aired in its time slot. The third campaign's premiere was simulcast live in Cinemark Theatres along with the regular Twitch and YouTube livestream. Similarly, the 17th episode of the third campaign was simulcast in Cinemark Theatres, Landmark Theatres, and Cinépolis alongside the regular livestream as part of their 7th anniversary celebration. The campaign went on hiatus from the end of May 2022 until June 30, 2022 (during which Exandria Unlimited: Calamity aired). In May 2024, Critical Role announced that Episode 98 will be filmed live at the Greek Theatre in Los Angeles on June 15 before airing on June 20, 2024. Brennan Lee Mulligan hosted a Q&A before the live show.

The show was placed on an unplanned hiatus in January 2025 as a result of the California wildfires in the Los Angeles metropolitan area where the studio, cast and crew are located. The filming of the finale was interrupted, with the cast returning to finish the following day. On January 30, 2025, Critical Role aired a live non-canon one-shot featuring the Bells Hells as a charity fundraiser to benefit the California Community Foundation (Wildfire Recovery Fund), the Latino Community Foundation and the LA Fire Department Foundation. Donors had the ability to choose various aspects of the game ahead of time and during the game. The finale aired on February 6, 2025; at over eight and a half hours, it is also the longest episode of the series.

=== Casting ===
The way in which guest players were scheduled changed for Campaign Three, moving away from single-episode appearances as had been common before. In the first two campaigns, the longest continuous appearance was Ashly Burch's four-episode run in Campaign Two, while Bailey and Willingham were absent following the birth of their child. Daymond portrayed Dorian for the first 14 episodes of the campaign. Shortly after Daymond's departure from the main campaign, he appeared in Exandria Unlimited: Kymal for a further two episodes as Dorian. He then pre‑recorded an audio piece for episode 41. Until Daymond, the guests with the highest episode count had been Will Friedle and Mary Elizabeth McGlynn, who appeared in a total of seven episodes over the course of Campaign One.

In Episode 92, Mercer dismissed the main cast at the ad break including "himself as Dungeon Master". The episode then picked up with Aabria Iyengar as the Dungeon Master with Mercer, Daymond, Aimee Carrero, Anjali Bhimani, and Erica Lindbeck reprising their player roles from the spinoff Exandria Unlimited: Kymal. The following episode wrapped up the Crown Keepers storyline with the guest cast; the main cast returned after the ad break with Daymond as the only continuing guest star.

At the end of Episode 98, Mulligan took Mercer's place – his monologue was the opening of a magical projection of the past witnessed by Bells Hells and Ludnius Da'leth. Critical Role then announced the next episodes would be a three-part special titled "Downfall" with Mulligan as the Dungeon Master and the player cast as Bailey, Jaffe, Johnson, Noshir Dalal, Nick Marini, and Abubakar Salim. In 2022, Mulligan was the Dungeon Master for the limited series Exandria Unlimited: Calamity which focused on the events that triggered the Calamity. "Downfall" is set over a century into the Calamity; while officially part of the third campaign, it is advertised as a standalone special that does not require prior knowledge of Critical Role or Exandria Unlimited. Cheryl Teh of Business Insider highlighted that "Downfall" focuses on the fall of the magocracy Aeor and suggested this will "allow Mulligan to flex his storytelling chops, perhaps reprising some elements of his first EXU: Calamity run". Mulligan commented that the two series wrestle with very different themes so while both are about the fall of flying cities, each has a distinct story. Mulligan also highlighted that while Calamity shows the trigger of the Calamity, it was more about the end of the Age of Arcanum while Downfall occurs over a century into the Calamity and showcases that era. In the last hour of Episode 107, Salim reprised his role as the Arch Heart while also serving as the Dungeon Master. Teh noted that this is "the first time Mercer has handed over the CR reins to someone outside his regular nerdworld collaborators". Tara McCauley of The Escapist commented that unlike the previous guest Dungeon Masters for the campaign, "Salim's godly role combined Dungeon Mastering and divine intervention" by acting from the perspective of the Arch Heart.

In August 2024, Mercer started to seed the return of the players as their previous campaign parties within arcs in the third campaign which would allow the cast to "play as Vox Machina, the Mighty Nein, and Bells Hells in what would technically be the same fight, though spread out over their respective targets". In October 2024, the cast then reprised their roles as the Mighty Nein while also role-playing as the Bells Hells. From Episode 112 to Episode 114, the cast also reprised their roles as Vox Machina in a concurrent arc focused on destroying the Malleus Key. On the switch from playing one character for three years straight to playing multiple characters at once, Riegel stated "the biggest challenge is keeping our voices straight in our heads because we've played so many different characters over the years". Bailey noted that "it wasn't like jumping in from ground zero" due to recently reprising their older characters on The Legend of Vox Machina and The Mighty Nein animated series. Lindbeck, Iyengar, Navarro and Carrero reprised their various player roles in the finale.

=== Post-campaign ===
As part of the show's tenth anniversary celebration in 2025, Critical Role has announced a live tour which will occur in cities across the United States and Australia. The June 2025 live shows in Sydney and Melbourne featured two blended parties with characters from both the Mighty Nein and Bells Hells on the search for Ludinus Da'leth in the Shattered Teeth. The August 2025 live show in Indianapolis was the "first one-shot set in the world of Exandria" which used the Daggerheart game system. This show, titled "Oaths & Ash", "revolved around questionable deals made by Fearne Calloway" along with "the lengths her party, Bells Hells, will go to save her immortal soul".

== Episodes ==
=== 2021 ===
List of episodes in 2021
Episode	Title	Run time	Original release date	Notes
1	"The Draw of Destiny"	03:58:25	October 21, 2021	Guest stars Robbie Daymond. Was simulcast in Cinemark Theatres alongside the regular Twitch and YouTube livestream.
The episode opens in the Oderan Wilds' capital city of Jrusar with Imogen and Laudna on a cable car heading to the Starpoint Conservatory where they discover their request to access the libraries has been denied. Meanwhile, Ashton and Fresh Cut Grass head to the Spire by Fire Inn to seek work. Orym, Fearne, and Dorian arrive in the city via airship; they have been tasked by the leader of the Air Ashari, Keyleth, to find a man. Everyone is drawn together by an arcane incident outside the Spire by Fire where they group up to fight animated objects. They are assisted by an elderly Sir Bertrand Bell who then offers to introduce them to a well paying man, Lord Ariks Eshteross. The next day everyone regroups before heading to Eshteross's manor. Eshteross challenges the group to prove themselves due to Bertrand's boasting – the episode ends as the lord himself rushes the group.
2	"Trial by Firelight"	04:07:40	October 28, 2021	Guest stars Robbie Daymond. Aired on the last Thursday of October as an exception.
The fight against Lord Eshteross ensues and while Dorian falls unconscious briefly, they prove themselves as good fighters and Lord Eshteross offers them employment. The group decides to discuss the matter over food, but since all their direct needs will be met – money, an introduction to the city and a good word for Imogen – they agree. The group must prove themselves before a contract is made by finding out who is stealing goods from Lord Eshteross’ storage. They head over to the storage and Imogen, Orym and FCG go inside using a cover story, peer into the minds of some workers, and find brumestone residue in the crates where items were stolen. They decide to wait till sundown, when the workers are leaving, to send Orym in invisibly. Dorian stays out front, while Bertrand and Imogen follow the sketchy manager Danas into the night, leaving the rest of the group behind the building.
3	"The Trail and the Toll"	04:08:42	November 4, 2021	Guest stars Robbie Daymond.
Bertrand and Imogen follow Danas to the Weary Way tavern but lose sight of her inside. They return to the storage, where some extra folks have joined Orym inside and found paperwork showing that Danas is part of the theft problem. The whole group heads back to the tavern, where they overhear Danas talking to some superior who ‘no longer requires her assistance’ in a room upstairs. The group rush in to save the choking gnome and finds a grim-looking dwarf who is up for a fight. A bunch of fiery shade creepers join him, and while the party kills these little guys the dwarf gets away. They find Danas’ body and bring it to lord Estheross, whom they talk to over dinner, and make their way to the Spire by Fire for the night. After a few drinks, people start heading to their respective beds when Bertrand decides to drunkenly wander around the streets looking for tomorrow's meetup point when the pale dwarf corners him in an alley and stabs him repeatedly until he lies unconscious on the ground. In a regularly reoccurring nightmare, Imogen suddenly sees Bertrand acting strangely and wakes up concerned.
4	"On the Trail of a Killer"	03:52:12	November 11, 2021	Guest stars Robbie Daymond.
Imogen wakes up Laudna, explains why she is worried about Bertrand, and together they head to the Spire by Fire to look for Bertrand. They wake up the three friends staying there and after checking the room start looking outside and find his body in the alley. They decide to go back to lord Estheross, who gives them shelter for the night. In the morning, they meet with FCG and Ashton and start looking into what happened, beginning in the room in which they fought the dwarf. Orym discovers a shaft behind the wall which goes very far down into the spire, but it is too small for them to go through. Dorian charms someone in a tavern to talk a little about the dwarf and finds out his name is Dugger, and he might be involved with the Hubatt Corsairs. They head to the Fawnsee Hollow, where Ashton lives, and to the Elder's Post, shady places inside Jrusar's spires, where a ‘friend’ of Ashton tells them to go to the Root Trader and ‘come for the laughter’ if they want to talk to the Corsairs. They are led backstage to a room filled with a few dozen armed men.
5	"The Threat Between the Walls"	04:25:35	November 18, 2021	Guest stars Robbie Daymond.
One person, Yash Mangal, steps up to have a conversation with them. After giving him some collateral (names of loved ones), they are not killed for knowing this hideout of the Corsairs and they gather some information on Dugger's past with the group and his current whereabouts. On their way out of the Post, they buy healing potions from Ashton's ‘friend’ Advik. The party goes to Dugger's house to investigate it and finds that all furniture is in disarray, and everything is covered in sticky goo. They find another small hole in the wall, from which the slimy dwarf emerges. A battle ensues, in which several members get close to dying, but they manage to kill Dugger and his fiery shade creepers. They head back to Lord Eshteross who gives them a bounty for Bertrand's murderer before they head off to the Spire by Fire for a night's rest.
6	"Growing Bonds and Teasing Threads"	03:54:57	December 2, 2021	Guest stars Robbie Daymond.
The party plays a drinking game of "What the Fuck is Up with That" to get to know each other a little better. The person who rolls the lowest must answer a short series of questions the highest roller asks them and elaborate until everyone is satisfied. The next day they head back to the Corsairs to tell them they have killed Dugger and to offer a meeting between them and Lord Eshteross. They update Lord Eshteross on this before heading to Zhudanna for a private conversation where Orym explains that he is looking for Oshad Brushio, a mercenary who became a bodyguard to the Lumas twins, because an assassination he recently survived may be related to one that happened in Zephrah years ago. They once again head to Lord Eshteross and he asks them to investigate some disappearances that have been happening recently near the Dreamscape Theatre. As they get ready to watch a show, Dorian gets pulled aside by Cyrus Wyvernwind, his brother.
7	"Behind the Curtain"	03:49:38	December 9, 2021	Guest stars Robbie Daymond. Introduction of Willingham's new character.
The party watches the show and afterwards sneak backstage, where they walk into Stuvan, the head of the theatre. After FCG heals a performer who was injured during the performance, the group explains to Stuvan that they want to investigate the disappearances that have been happening. He tells them six patrons/employees have gone missing in the past three weeks and allows them to look through the whole theatre, talking to the stage manager Ocoma and finance woman Tefta. Eventually, they end up in a side alley behind the theatre, when the back wall suddenly grows teeth and starts attacking them. While badly hurt, the party kills the wall and informs Stuvan and the Wilders of what has transpired. As they are about to walk away, a gnomish figure stands at the end of the alley. This man, Chetney, asks the party for some help to locate a friend, but first, they head to the Spire by Fire for some drinks and sleep.
8	"A Woodworker's Quandary"	03:23:00	December 16, 2021	Guest stars Robbie Daymond.
While the group is getting to know Chetney a little better over drinks, Orym notices they are being watched, and they eventually find out that it is Dorian's brother Cyrus. Cyrus joins the crew and explains there is a giant bounty on his head because he was the fall guy in a robbery he was unaware his fellow mercenaries were planning. Dorian brings him back to his place, giving him a sending stone to reach out if he needs help. The next day, the group heads to the place where Gurge, the guy Chetney is looking for, is staying, and they find claw marks throughout the tossed apartment. They decide to head towards the factory since a dire wolf attack allegedly happened nearby there recently and ask the wardens at the entrance about it. They react strangely to the name Gurge and head inside, so Fearne wildshapes into a rat and follows them. She listens to the conversation the guards have with their boss, but when the guards are heading back, they step on Rat Fearne and she reverts back to her faun self.

=== 2022 ===
List of episodes in 2022
Episode	Title	Run time	Original release date	Notes
9	"Thicker Grows the Meal and Plot"	04:14:35	January 6, 2022	Guest stars Robbie Daymond.
Although she is off to a rough start, Fearne eventually succeeds in charming the head warden and he tells her they were given a little money to help bounty hunter Artana capture Gurge, alive, so she could bring him to whoever gave her the task. The party makes their way back to Eshteross to give him some updates and he tells them Artana's sister Preia has a tavern on the Smolder Spire. They head there, and FCG figures out there may be something going on in the kitchen. When Chetney sneaks in there, he finds a hidden door. A small group enters it and meets Artana, who they bribe into telling them where she brought Gurge. The party heads to that place, the Moon Tower, realizes it will be hard to sneak into, and instead asks Eshteross for a letter to get in. The letter gets them in, but the person they want to speak to, Vali Dertrana, is not available. Still, Chetney sneaks into his office, steals some money and a map, overhears a conversation happening in a hidden chamber, and when he is almost caught jumps through the stained-glass window to escape.
10	"Ghosts, Dates, and Darker Fates"	03:16:29	January 13, 2022	Guest stars Robbie Daymond.
Chetney pulls off a ghost-act which scares Vali and the wardens and gets the group off the premises of the Mirror Towers. Orym, Dorian and Chetney keep watch near the towers, while the ladies and FCG go on a date they had promised the ogre cook Pretty earlier that day in the tavern – he rejects them at the end of the night. Ashton heads to the Lucern Spire to talk to Jiana Hexum, a rich woman he is indebted to, who asks them to join a competitive burglary battle with an enemy of hers. Dorian's brother is being held responsible for an item which was stolen from her, so Ashton offers they could retrieve this for her since they are already involved in it. The crew return together to the Moon Tower, sneak in by terrifying a few guards, and go downstairs to see Gurge and some others in cages and a nightmarish creature who greets them.
11	"Chasing Nightmares"	04:52:18	January 20, 2022	Guest stars Robbie Daymond.
Ira Wendagoth, the Nightmare King, throws a ball which animates some of the furniture and a tough fight ensues. Both Dorian and Orym barely survive, FCG is briefly turned into a turtle, and Ira manages to escape. A strange machine starts to hum loudly so the party runs out of the tower before it is blown to pieces. They rest for the night, returning to Lord Eshteross the next day. He tells them they can meet Brushio and hands Imogen a letter that will get her into the Starpoint Academy, but first, he gives them a little coin to refresh themselves, since they look rough. The group heads to the Diamond Horizon spa, where they get absolutely spoiled, before heading to Mahaan Lumas to speak to The Anger about the assassination. He speaks of what happened and tells them to contact Estani in the Heartmoor for more information. The group then heads to the Starpoint Conservatory, where Imogen is allowed into the library. She looks into the dreams of red storms she has been having, and finds a research paper which mentions her mother Liliana Temult as a subject. The last pages of the study, however, have been torn out.
12	"Make It Fashion"	04:36:53	February 3, 2022	Guest stars Robbie Daymond.
The scribe tells Imogen the late Lumas twins were the last to read the book with the torn pages. The next few days, the group orders some luxury clothing for the ball they might be going to and do some magic shopping at Marwa's Trove. Fearne steals a magic egg, realizes it is very expensive and sneakily puts it back. Laudna decides to buy it the next day while trying to become friends with Marwa. Imogen and Orym go back to the Lumas' house to see if they can find the torn pages but are unsuccessful. Imogen does some more research on where magic comes from, while everyone crafts their masks for the ball. The day before the ball they meet with Eshteross, who tells them they will go in two groups. Dorian will be the royal of the second group, presenting as himself, Brontë Secondsun Wyvernwind of the Silken Squall. Lord Eshteross gives them a ring that is identical to the one Armand Treshi wears and asks if they could swap it at the ball. The next day, as the sun sets, carriages bring the two groups up to the Chandei Quorum quarters.
13	"A Dance of Deception"	04:01:00	February 10, 2022	Guest stars Robbie Daymond.
The group enters the party, leaving most of their weapons outside. They start mingling and Fearne and Dorian briefly chat with the Voice of the Quorum, Gavis Aranda. Ashton clocks Armand Treshi's date, Lady Emoth Kade, who is suspiciously waiting for a cue. As the Dance of the Crossroads begins, where partners are constantly switching, the group engages with Armand. Fearne pulls off his ring, which falls to the ground. FCG hides it, while Imogen pretends to find it and hands him the decoy. Armand is a little suspicious of the whole thing. Cyrus, Dorian's brother, is also spotted at the ball, and he is doing business with Lady Emoth. She goes off in a room, which Chetney clocks. He eventually follows and sees her transformed into a grey slimy creature with a few small minions, seemingly robbing the place. Ashton has been wearing a mask that looks like the Nightmare King, and when Vali Dertrana notices it, he sends the head of Paragon's Call, a group of tough mercenaries, to him. The general pulls off Ashton's mask and they head outside for a fistfight.
14	"In Too Deep"	04:45:08	February 17, 2022	Guest stars Robbie Daymond.
The fight happens, and although Ashton is off to a good start Ratanjsh knocks him unconscious and uses this display to promote Paragon's Call. Chetney sees a detective couple called the Green Seekers go into the back area where Cyrus went. The party heads towards the back hallway, where they hear two guards getting killed in Lady Emoth's room. They head inside and start fighting a Dugger-esque Lady Emoth, and while they manage to save one guard, Lady Emoth escapes through a hole. As they finish the fight, they notice Cyrus is being escorted like a prisoner by the Green Seekers. Dorian throws a fog bomb and sneaks his brother out of the party. Back at Eshteross' manor, Cyrus tells them Lady Emoth told him to steal from some other Mahaan houses at the party and remembers she regularly mentioned her mother. Since Cyrus is now even more of a fugitive, Eshteross offers him safe passage to Emon on his airship, as well as Dorian, since they look too much alike. Dorian accepts and says his temporary goodbyes, but not before he is confirmed as a member of Bells Hells, the official name of this group of friends.
15	"The Tunnels Below"	04:42:24	March 3, 2022	–
The next morning, Bells Hells starts making their way towards Jiana Hexum to go on her journey next, when they get stopped and questioned by the Green Seekers, Gus and Olly. While the Seekers are suspicious of them, they show they have knowledge and gain enough trust to be invited to join an investigation into the mines to find more information on the shade creepers and Lady Emoth. Gus' ex Ogdes Friez runs part of the Underrush mines and tells them the Crownset mines have been closed for months without clear reason. After some relationship therapy for the ex-couple with FCG, the group speaks with foreman Shotan Bruo. With Gus torturing him and FCG reading his mind, they are able to gather that the Treshi's own the Crownset mines now, and after Shotan's memory is wiped he lets them down into the mine, where they immediately have to fight a group of shade creepers. After dispatching the shade creepers, the party gets to a room where they see Lady Emoth Kade looking up at a gargantuan mass of pulsing flesh, which has humanoid features, as she says "mother, we've got visitors".
16	"The Shade Mother"	04:12:12	March 10, 2022	–
As the party enters the chamber, the Shade mother starts floating by the brumestone attached to her. Chetney captures Lady Emoth in a ball the Seekers gave him, and while they are fighting the Shade Mother, they try to get out as fast as they can with Emoth. They manage to do so, returning to the elevator and up. The Green Seekers let the group know they are working for Orlana Seshadri, a woman the group already expected might be on the Chandei Quorum after the party, and who has a disdain towards Armand Treshi. After a meal made by Pretty, the party gets ready to bed down. The group does a little self-care intervention with FCG, and Imogen tries to determine what the purple glowing stone is that she collected from the Shade Mother's lair. She just gets a sour feeling like something wants to take hold of her. She realizes it is like the machines she saw the Nightmare King working on, but it is warm and comforting and she falls asleep cradling it. Chetney invites Fearne to his private room. She tells him to howl at 3 am if he wants to, but he sleeps through it.
17	"Heart-to-Heartmoor"	04:11:30	March 17, 2022	This episode coincided with the seven year anniversary of the show. To commemorate this the episode was a simulcast in Cinemark Theatres, Landmark Theatres, and Cinépolis alongside the regular Twitch and YouTube livestreams.
Imogen has her recurring nightmare, but this time the purple gem offers her a way out instead of running away. She hesitates but runs following her mother's voice instead. FCG identifies the stone as a shard of the Gnarlrock, a stone of Fey origin which mutates things. The group go to Jiana Hexum to accept her job to steal from Mr Evon Hytroga, before Mistress Isha Sabanis' group does so. Fearne and Laudna give Eshteross an update, FCG, Orym and Ashton head to Milo to give FCG a checkup, and Imogen and Chetney buy horses for the journey. Once travelling, Orym steals a pink gem from a giant rabbit, which turns out to be a Feywild shard. On day three, a lightning storm splits a tree, and they collect a blue chromatic rose from its centre. During the nights, many conversations are had about people's pasts. On the fourth night, a fairy-like creature lurks around their campsite, and the group tries to engage with it. When Fearne gets close to it, she is urged to keep walking forward. Ashton immediately chases her, until she stops in front of a treelike creature with a massive beak.
18	"A Hungry Jungle"	03:23:13	March 24, 2022	–
Ashton immediately gets swallowed by the creature, and in the following fight many others do, but eventually they manage to kill the creature. Imogen accidentally turns her skin navy blue during the fight. They rest some more, and the next day meet a hunting party with whom they ride the last few hours to the Heartmore Hamlet. They check into the Sodden Grange Inn, make their way to the Twilight Mirror museum to let the fabulous Mr Evon Hytroga know they are in town, and then walk towards the Blue Herald's Hill where they go to the Mosslight Manor which belongs to Estani, the Lumas twins' friend. Estani invites them in for tea and a conversation.
19	"Omens Above"	03:55:12	April 7, 2022	–
Estani tells the group how the twins were killed by three attackers, and that their satchels were taken. They had been studying Ruidus and its 'ruddy flares'. They head to the Herald's Hill Garden, where the twins were killed, and Fearne takes a quick trip as a frog into a statue that perpetually has a small water flow, finding out it probably leads to the water plane. The group does some burglary shopping, finding out the group they travelled into town with will be their opponents, and when the night falls, they return to Estani to look at Ruidus through his telescope. As Orym focuses, he pushes Imogen in front of the telescope to show her the red storms visible on Ruidus' surface, like the ones in her dreams. Estani suggests the crew could go to the Omen Archive and the Aydinlan Seminary in Yios, where Kadija Sumal works. Imogen has another nightmare, but this time she walks into the storm, where she sees outlines of people, smiling maliciously, before waking up. Fearne notices the markings on Imogen's arms have grown slightly. The next evening, the party hears they will need to steal an earring called the Wind Folly.
20	"Breaking and Entering..."	03:36:18	April 14, 2022	–
Once Evon gives them the go-sign, two guys from the other group immediately sneak in, and Chetney invisibly follows them. The rest of Bells Hells clumsily breaks through a window. As the party finds a few traps and eventually also a way down into the museum proper, Chetney sees the two guys he was following glued to a ceiling and heads back to the group. They realize they are behind the other part of their opponents, but after fighting some illusions they find these folks unconscious in a room. The two Chetney left behind catch up, but the group throws some obstacles their way. They fight off some creepy marionettes, and Chetney falls down a slide into some acidic jelly, hurting him so badly in his werewolf form he lashes out to Orym when he saves him, but eventually, the group make their way into the final room, looking rather rough, where they start hitting the glass around the Wind Folly earring when two constructs come to life.
21	"Fight at the Museum..."	03:47:28	April 21, 2022	Fearne was played by Laura Bailey as Ashley Johnson was isolating with COVID-19. Johnson texted the group directions during this episode.
The party quickly grabs the earring, but their opponents have locked the door so they must fight the constructs. When the other team tries to go inside, Imogen triggers a trap which sets them on fire. With FCG hiding the earring, they start heading back, heal their opponents a little and convince them that they do not have the ring. They steal a diary and make a quick stop at Hytroga's office, stealing some papers and glasses from a heavily locked drawer, before claiming their victory. They rest outside the city, FCG removes the navy from Imogen's skin, and Chetney and Orym pass by the toy shop. The owner is from Uthodurn and knows Chetney's old mentor Oltgar, which he does not like. While heading back, Estani catches them, tells them the twins joined a group called the Grim Verify before they passed, and hands them a letter that they can hand to his friend Ebenold Kai if they go to Yios. As they head back to Jrusar, they discover Hytroga's hidden letters are often towards SP.Y.SH-N, which Orym deciphers as referring to Spireling Shenn. They also discuss weird shipments Hexum is getting, which Ashton remembers, although his memory is fuzzy.
22	"Promise and Potential"	04:21:06	May 5, 2022	Ashley Johnson appeared remotely for this episode during her COVID-19 recovery.
Back in Jrusar, Ashton is having scattered flashbacks. The next morning, they head to Jiana's to collect their reward, including the magical bust Fearne wanted. They then catch up with Eshteross, who tells them Armand Treshi was confirmed as a conspirator with Lady Emoth, and he is on the run to Bassuras, home of Paragon's Call. Eshteross asks Bells Hells to retrieve Armand, lending his skyship to take them there, and they agree to go next morning. They head to Ajit Dayal, who tells Chetney the Gorgynei, the werewolves he has been seeking, are roaming the Gloomed Jungles. They discuss Chetney's lash out towards Orym during the heist, before heading to Marwa's to buy a portable hole. They visit Milo, who makes a propellor for FCG and who tells their memory of the Hexum heist is also fuzzy. Still, they remember Ashton was clutching a crystal vial with a grey liquid which they poured into Ashton's skull when trying to fix them. Imogen and FCG dive deep into Ashton's thoughts and see flashbacks of them grabbing the vial out of one of these boxes Jiana is receiving, before red runes flash, and next Ashton's flying off the balcony.
23	"To The Skies"	04:14:53	May 12, 2022	–
Chetney decides to sneak out in the night to the Prism Emporium, where he was overcharged for a chisel, scaring the absolute living hell out of the owner Tuyen Otwana. The next morning, they test out their portable hole before going to Eshteross to pick up cookies and then head towards the Silver Sun, where captain Xandis leads them aboard the skyship and takes off towards the Hellcatch Valley. On day two, two skirath hunters attack the ship. During the fight Orym gets thrown overboard, but with Laudna slowing his fall and Imogen figuring out she can fly and coming after him, the fight ends without too much damage. The next evening, Laudna checks up on how Imogen is doing, and Imogen tells her the Gnarlrock has been comforting her, but she is also a little scared of it. Laudna feels a need to hold it and asks Imogen to let her do so. When she holds it in her hand, it heats up intensely and in Laudna's head Delilah Briarwood tells her the gem too powerful, and she will take care of it. When Laudna releases the gem, it is cold and broken, and Imogen is upset.
24	"The Hellcatch Valley"	03:55:34	May 19, 2022	Guest stars Erika Ishii.
Early next morning, Orym spots a caravan down below being approached by a dusttra, which they harpoon so the caravan can get away. Imogen approaches it and learns it was tortured by people and is seeking revenge, and while FCG tries to reason with it, they end up just lifting it up underneath the skyship and carrying it a ways away from the caravan before continuing, reaching Bassuras that evening. They are approached by the Gajakhandas, the 'police' of the town, but Ashton talks them into the city and leads them to the Raha Den for beds and food. FCG confides in Chetney there is a bird they have called Shithead that follows him around this city. The next morning, as they start making their way towards where Armand should be, they see an elf being encircled and they deftly kill the attackers before they can flee. The elf, Dusk, says she has some memory issues but she remembers she was in the Feywild once. They head towards the Taste of Taldorei for drinks.
25	"A Taste of Tal'Dorei"	04:23:45	June 30, 2022	Guest stars Erika Ishii. Aired on the last Thursday of June as an exception.
During the restaurant experience, Dusk explains she is looking for a couple who helped her travel back from her Feywild to Exandria. When she shows the group a portrait of them, Fearne recognizes them as her parents, Birdie and Ollie. Imogen then reaches out to Birdie, and after Imogen confirms who she is they suggest meeting at Joe's in a few days. Laudna confides in FCG about her falling out with Imogen, and Imogen does the same with Orym. As the party follows the blip coming from Armand's ring to the River of Renewal, they realize he pawned it. They head over to the Seat of Disdain, the fortress of Paragon's Call. Fearne turns into a quokka and sneaks in, where she briefly gets adopted by a Paragon member, before getting kicked out again. They come up with some ideas to get Armand, and eventually forge a note from the pawn shop owner Adon Hiro.
26	"Hidden Truths"	04:10:25	July 7, 2022	Guest stars Erika Ishii.
In the evening, Sorrowlord Zathuda contacts Dusk mentally and asks whether she has been successful yet in dispatching the Calloways. Imogen has another nightmare, but starts already standing in the storm, where the figures walk towards her, the leader greets her. She wakes up as they all rush her. Ruidus flares brightly red during her nightmare. The group wakes up with Paragon members at their place. They must explain what they were doing yesterday. They bring up Ashton's fight with Ratanish and get a day to explain themselves. Ashton, Imogen and Chetney then head to Justi, and old acquaintance of Ashton who is part of the All-Minds-Burn gang, who suggests they take Paragon's Call to the Run. FCG, Fearne and Dusk head to Finders Takers, where the owner Esmer tells FCG she saw Dancer, who he thought was dead, last month. Orym and Laudna sentry the Seat and see Armand take a smoke break. Everyone meets up at Imahara Joe's to buy a scrawler. They learn that Fearne's parents have been coming in occasionally to buy energy sources, and that FCG is most likely an ancient aeormaton. They head to a caravanserai to test for the night.
27	"A Race for the Prize"	04:01:16	July 14, 2022	Guest stars Erika Ishii.
The group notices there is something off about the postcards from Fearne's parents. Dusk asks Laudna on a date, but Laudna freaks out and leaves. She talks to Imogen, they make things right, and then pretend to still fight so FCG can help them. Instead, FCG is acting strangely, confusing people and seeming generally off. Orym asks Dusk for a wooden sword fight to blow off some steam, and during the first watch Chetney gives Fearne her toy: a wooden wolve. After picking up their bomb at Esmer's the next morning, the group heads to the Seat of Disdain, where Ashton, Laudna, Chetney and Dusk enter and briefly talk to Ratanish before being met by Otohan Thull, the leader of the Call. They say they would like some work, and are told they must first prove themselves. They decide to do this in a Deathwish Run, tonight. Fearne transforms into a rat and takes a quick look at the contraption on Otohan's back before not so sneakily going back to the group. Ashton and Laudna head by All-Minds-Burn to ask for some assistance in the race, and Justi hands Laudna some drugs. The group talks strategics and picks up their crawlers.
28	"The Deathwish Run"	04:28:03	July 21, 2022	Guest stars Erika Ishii.
The group turns FCG into the front wheel of the skirmisher-crawler driven by Chetney and assisted by Laudna, while Ashton gets behind the other wheel with Imogen. Imogen sees Otohan and recognizes her from her dreams. As everyone takes off, Imogen hits a crawlers with lighting, ending their race. Another driver gets hit with blindness and drives off into the ravine. Orym and Dusk dispatch the riders of a third crawler and claim their vehicle. As they drive into the caverns, the last non-Bell contenders are slammed and outed, right as a Kagaronk appears. The creature jumps them twice and hits Laudna, who was driving, unconscious. Ashton dispatches the Kagaronk, while Dusk heals Laudna. Ashton and Imogen slam into a wall that is pulled up. The others finish, and then wheel FCG to Imahara Joe. Imogen tries to read Dusk's mind, but is unable to do so. Chetney casually asks Dusk whether they are trying to kill Fearne's parents. Dusk tells Fearne, who believes Chetney is joking. The next morning, everyone heads to Joe's, where Birdie arrives as well. Fearne and Birdie reconnect, but Birdie does not recognize Dusk, who finally reveals her true form.
29	"Dark Portents"	03:36:48	August 4, 2022	Guest stars Erika Ishii.
Dusk, or better Yu Suffiad, explains they are a representative from the Unseelie Court, here to arrest Birdie, who stole the Moontide Crown. Birdie tells Fearne is Ruidusborn, and when they took Fearne to the Feywild, Ruidus entered there too. Fearne starts fighting Yu, but Imogen reads Birdie's thoughts and calls for a stop. Birdie explains Ollie, Fearne's dad, has had visions of Ruidus wrecking the Feywild, and they have been working together with the Nightmare King, who is quite crafty, to learn more about what is happening before the Apogee Solstice comes around next month. Eventually, Yu agrees to give Birdie a month to make her machine, before the Calloways will give back the Crown. Fearne gives Bridie the Weave Lens nana gave her, Yu leaves, and the group head with Birdie to Hondir, a former graduate at the Yios Seminary and member of the Grim Verity. Hondir says assassins have been killing Grim members, including the Lumas twins. Recent research has found documents that say Ruidus did not exist when the gods came to Exandria, and they also talk of two gods who no longer exist. Hondir has also met Imogen's mother Liliana. After talking, everyone headings to the Calloway Getaway.
30	"Reunion & Revelation"	03:37:25	August 11, 2022	–
As the groups heads towards the Getaway, a crawler gang called the Fists or the Ruiner stops them and tries to rob them. Imogen sets off their bomb and they fight. Imogen shoots lightening through the crawler and sends about sixty bullets their way. Hondir, Birdie, Imogen and FCG all go unconscious during the fight, but they eventually kill most of the gang, with the last ones fleeing, before healing everyone back up and heading towards the Getaway. Once there, they notice Ira decorated the place with Gnarlrock. Everyone meets Ollie, Fearne's dad, and Ira, who explains to them they are creating the Veilscatter Scope. This telescope should be able to push pasts the enchantments surrounding Ruidus, now that the Weave Lens has arrived. They also learn about how Birdie and Ollie met, and that Fearne's 'grandma', Morrigan, is a hag known as the Fatestitcher. They theorize the time bending that makes Fearne 112 when her parents thought she would be 14 was a deal between Ira and Morri. As Ira finished the telescope, Imogen and Orym look through it, and see Ruidus engraved in a lattice of energy, with on the moon a city.
31	"Breaking Point"	03:52:41	August 18, 2022	–
Ira explains he built the machine at the Unseelie court, and that he was working with Ludinus Da'Leth. He takes the Crown before disappearing. Ashton smashes the Weave Lens. Ollie lets FCG and Imogen look into his mind. Memories about Ira are blurry, suggesting he frequently altered the Calloway's minds. While Ashton and Ollie wreck the workshop, Imogen and FCG take Fearne aside and they tell her it is okay to be angry at her parents. Chetney hands Fearne a doll to yell at, which she names Caviar. Fearne talks to her parents about her conflicted feelings, and Orym gives Imogen a peptalk and asks her to update the Voice of Tempest on their findings. Fearne secretly cuts down two of the purple rocks and puts them in Laudna's doll house and in Imogen's pocket. When Laudna touches her stone, Delilah steals its power once again. FCG tries to contact Dancer but goes static afterwards. He starts attacking everyone and shouting mean things. The ladies knock FCG unconscious, and when he wakes up again, he is back to normal. Imogen cannot find any memory of what just happened in FCG's mind. The group theorizes FCG might have killed his former group this way.
32	"A Stage Set"	04:34:30	September 1, 2022	–
Back in Bassuras, the group meets with Dancer. Afterwards they head to Joe's, who tells them Dancer bought FCG from a masked figure named D. Imahara checks FCG's innards, but nothing seems wrong. He tells them about the Care and Culling, a pre-divergent event, in which Aeorian automatons were sent to political leaders, to initially care for them but later kill then. As FCG is a little moral-less, Imahara gives them a token of the Changebringer. The groups heads towards the Seat, when Orym spots Artana Voe outside. Once inside, Bells Hells are given a room, and they help loading some boxes. A few are like the ones Jiana Hexum has been having, but they are labeled 'Treshi'. Two fortified chests have a Cerberus Assembly emblem. A dust storms hits Bassuras, but Laudna and Ashton head to the Bank of Renewal regardless to pick up Treshi's tracking ring. Meanwhile, Chetney sneaks down into the basement, where FCG determined Treshi was hiding. Chetney finds Treshi in a cell that has been turned into a guest room, and sees massive metal vault doors, but returns to the group. They then hear shouts outside, as the mammoth crawler with all the load is being attacked.
33	"Blood and Dust"	03:56:22	September 8, 2022	–
Imogen, Chetney and Orym run to protect Treshi while the others head outside. Ashton gets three vials from a crate identical to Hexum's. Fearne gets a black chest. FCG drives around in a skirmisher crawler, while Laudna climbs up to Otohan's balcony and plants the tracking ring on her. Inside, the guards in the basement are fighting Artana Voe. Bells Hells somewhat works together with Artana, but eventually ditch her, letting her escape. They force Treshi to go into their portable hole. Everyone exits through the back gate but Otohan meets them there and demands a conversation. Three shadowy figures, similar to the Zephrah assassins, surround her. When they do not want to talk, Otohan starts slashing the party down quickly. They try to flee, but many are unable to do so. They then try to keep everyone alive, but Otohan notices this and goes all in on Orym, killing him. Laudna tells Otohan where Ira is, but she murders Fearne regardless. Imogen calls out, and Otohan tells her her friends will live if she gives into the storm inside her. When Otohan goes for Laudna, Imogen does so, and with that the city swirls around her.
34	"What Dreams May Come"	03:40:31	September 15, 2022	–
As Imogen is pulsing with energy, everyone has flashbacks to their youth. Otohan calls Imogen a predator, but with her mother telling her to run, Imogen blasts Otoham far away. A large crater is created in the street, and as everyone reappears in it Laudna breathes her last breath. FCG brings Fearne back to life. Fearne only has the means to save one person, and after flipping a coin she brings back Orym. They flee to Joe's and interrogate Treshi. Treshi has been passing shipments from the Ozmit sea to Paragon's Call, through Jiana, for a few years. He tells shipments have increased recently. The black box they got contains residuum. The group rests under Joe's place, and when the Call comes to look for them they hide. The next morning, FCG apologizes to Chetney by giving him a wooden toolbox they made, and Ashton shares the Hishari helmet they stole from Hytroga's museum was like the one his father wore the last time they saw them, right before their hometown was destroyed. Chetney gives FCG a wooden emotion indicator. Imogen updates Eshteross and calls captain Xandis, who picks them up early that afternoon, starting their track back to Jrusar.
35	"Pyrrhic Return"	04:35:31	September 22, 2022	–
On the skyship, Bells Hells investigates Treshi a little further and send some messages to the Voice of the Tempest and Jiana Hexum about potentially bringing Laudna back to life. The next day, a sandstorm breaks the ship's sail and throws Bells Hells, minus Ashton, off the boat. Fearne makes noise so everyone can come to her, but this also attracts a giant burrowing creature. Orym nearly falls into its jaw helping out Fearne, but with some clever teamwork everyone makes it back to the ship. A few days later, the skyship returns to Jrusar. The group heads to Eshteross, updates him and leaves Laudna there for the time being, before going to the Chandei Quorum to hand Armand over to Orlana Seshadri, collecting the bounty and carefully sharing some findings. Once in the Spire by Fire, Imogen and FCG dive into Ashton's memories of the break in at Hexum's, but while FCG lives through the memory, Imogen gets caught in an infinite galaxy of potential lifelines. FCG gets stuck in Ashton's head, but eventually both break out. The next morning, as Bells Hells goes to Manaia Turei for potential transport, Keyleth shows up and takes everyone to Whitestone.
36	"A Desperate Call"	04:16:08	October 6, 2022	–
Keyleth leads the party to the Whitestone Castle, where she brings them to Lord Percival De Rolo before she takes her leave. Bells Hells explain they have come to save their friend, Laudna, who died once thirty years ago because of circumstances involving Vox Machina. Percy calls for Pike, and Lady Vex'ahlia joins too. When everyone is there and updated on the situation, Pike tries to resurrect Laudna but finds Delilah Briarwood's soul also attached to the body. To get Laudna back, Bells Hells must go to the plane on which Laudna and Delilah's souls are residing, and separate them long enough for Pike to bring only Laudna back. Pike looks into FCG to confirm they have a soul, held by the Changebringer, which means they can travel along. Once Pike planeshifts them, they enter a grey world, where they move towards a cabin where Chetney sees a shadowy version of Laudna, with a purple glowing center. She disappears since some creatures are burning down the cabin. The party fights the creatures, stops the fire, and then finds a tunnel inside it. They go in and eventually emerge in what looks like a shadow version of Whitestone.
37	"From the Boughs"	04:10:18	October 13, 2022	–
As they try to get to the Suntree, the city, made of the same stonelike material this whole plane seems to be made of, keeps shifting to block them. They find a younger version of Laudna, Matilda, having a conversation with a ghost, but Imogen convinces her not to accept its offer. The shape flees to a barn, where the group finds an even younger Laudna, who explains to Imogen the tree will not let her leave the city. The barn tries to choke them, so Chetney blows them out with dynamite. They head towards the Suntree, but they find two ghosts dressed up as Laudna's parents getting her ready for the Briarwood dinner. The ghosts jump the group when they try to intervene but are quickly killed. Delilah then invites them to the centre of the city. They have a tense conversation and speak shortly with Laudna, who is stuck in the Suntree, before a fight ensues. FCG gets knocked unconscious, which sends him back to Exandria, and Orym follows after trying to open up the Suntree. Imogen eventually splits the Suntree with lightning, after which everything goes white. Everyone wakes up in Pike's house.
38	"A Dark Balance"	04:20:44	October 20, 2022	–
Pike performs the resurrection ritual and brings Laudna back. Vox Machina approaches Laudna carefully, until it is confirmed Delilah is not around. Laudna goes to the Suntree and feels its warmth, replacing her dark memories. Bells Hells shares info with the De Rolo's on Ruidus and return the found residuum. The De Rolo's apologize to Laudna for what happened to her, and Vex'ahlia gives her a protective ring. As they fall asleep under the Suntree, Imogen has another nightmare, and FCG joins through a spell. While in the familiar field, they see a masculine form vanish into the storm. Imogen pushes deeper into the storm, which turns colder and darker, until they are surrounded by stars. They abruptly awake. The next morning, while everyone goes shopping, FCG visits the Horizon Temple where guide Osli Kamyda introduces them to the Changebringer. Manaia Turei brings the group back to Jrusar. They head to Eshteross, afraid he is dead because of Imogen's dream, and Chetney indeed finds Eshteross dead in his bedroom. He smells Otohan was here, and Orym recognizes the toxin that was used in Zephrah. Chetney finds Eshteross' testament, in which he leaves Bells Hells his cane, Turmoil, and his skyship.
39	"The Momentum of Murder"	03:32:47	November 3, 2022	–
The party goes to the Spire by Fire and contact Mistress Seshadri to inform her about Estheross' death. She sends the Green Seekers to them, who bring them to Eshteross' house. There, Grave Mystic Weva Vudol asks Eshteross' corpse some questions, and he confirms Bells Hells are innocent. They hand Eshteross' letters to Orlana before saying their goodbyes to Lord Ariks Eshteross. The next morning, the party checks up on their skyship, the Silver Sun, and do some shopping before heading towards Yios the following day. One evening, as some are already asleep, Ruidus emits a ruddy flare. Imogen's happy dream turns into a moon dream, in which she runs towards what she thinks is Laudna, but what turns out to be her mother, telling her once again to run. Meanwhile, Chetney cannot resist his lycanthropic side and transforms into a werewolf. He hurts Orym and Fearne before he can shake it off. Imogen flies towards Ruidus in her dream, but when the flare subsides, she starts plummeting to the ground until she wakes up. She sends a message to her mom, asking if she is there, to which her mother replies: 'Imogen?'
40	"Compulsions"	03:56:30	November 10, 2022	–
Imogen's mother explains she is sorry that she left Imogen, but she should stay far away for Imogen's safety. Imogen responds she is tired of running. They do a group checkup, in which they conclude almost everyone (except Orym) might hurt the group at some point, and Ashton gives Orym a little peptalk. A few days go by before FCG gets attacked by some petrifying birds. The birds however are fleeing from a chimera, which attacks the boat. During the fight, Imogen summons a red shade which psychically damages creatures when they get near, before Fearne deals the final blow. Once they reach the Gloomed Jungles, the party descends from the skyship, and at dusk they howl loudly. The gorgynei show up, and take them to their village, Barinak. Once there, their leader Annaline (also known as Divaasheela) agrees to take Chetney and the rest to Zha'Vrollo, the Temple of the Savage Heart, where Chetney will undergo a trial.
41	"Call of the Wild"	04:11:05	December 8, 2022	Features pre-recorded audio segment by guest star Robbie Daymond.
The next morning, they start their track to the temple. Fearne eats a psychedelic mushroom, and the Gorgynei manage to avoid a fight with some twilight tigers. When they camp down for the night, Annaline takes Chetney aside and inquires about why he wants to learn more about hemocraft. They talk through the night, Annaline sharing how she got the curse/gift from an elf named Dorao, while she teaches Chetney some more advanced glyph work. The next day they make it to the temple, where they camp for the night as Chetney meditates to contact Sahyaadon. As night falls, Sahyaadon answers and turns Chetney into a massive werewolf. He starts fighting his friends, who try to both hurt him but also try to talk him out of it. Words do not seem to reach Chetney, until Ashton tells him to fight only them and leave the others alone. Chetney comes to his senses and turns back to his gnomish form; he has succeeded. As everyone undresses to run around the woods naked, Orym gets drawn to the statue of Serataani, the Wildmother. When he puts his sword in the sheath she is holding, Serataani imbues it with magic.
42	"The City of Flowing Light"	03:53:29	December 15, 2022	–
The next day, Fearne teaches Laudna how to create a fire ball, badly burning Fearne in the process, and Ashton spars with Annalise for a bit before the skyship picks them up. While FCG learns how to cook, they travel to Yios, where they land at the Lakecap Skyport as the next evening hits. They gamble a bit in the lounge, cheat a little but do not get caught, before they 'comp' the 'presidential' room (FCG and Fearne pay for it). Ashton gets a little drunk and tells Pâte they will kill him if he turns out to be Delilah. Imogen sneaks out of the room, floating above the city for a while, sending messages to her mother, before heading back inside. The next day, cityguide Landon Kreshawl takes them to the Dominion ring, up to the Starpoint Conservatory, where a scrawny bird caws loudly as it sees FCG appear.
43	"Axiom Shaken"	04:14:36	December 22, 2022	Tailesin Jaffe is absent this episode
The bird, Shithead, starts defecating on FCG's head. They find out Shithead in an undead bird that simply dislikes FCG, but the bird escapes. They notice Ashton is missing. Once inside the Aydinlan seminary, clerk Carolle tells them Ebenold Kai, a member of the Grim Verity, has been absent for some time, while professor Kadija Sumal will be in tomorrow. Vasselheim Judicators are walking around the campus, and Carolle tells them professor Vitro Isham is knowledgeable on automatons. They head to Professor Kai's house, which has a few traps set up. Chetney activates most of them, but eventually they find the basement, where Kai and Dr. Baryn Vestisho, who is well-versed in history, run through a portal. The group follows, ending up in a lab of Planerider Ryn on the Fire Plane. They exchange information about Ruidus, learning that the two forgotten gods, Ethedok and Vordo, were devoured by something called Predathos during the Founding. Its imprisonment created Ruidus. They also learn Imogen's mother now works with Thull. Thull and the others are building machines in the Hellctach valley, but also in matching spots in the Feywild and Shadowfell. After talking, Ryn teleports them back to the basement.

=== 2023 ===
List of episodes in 2023
Episode	Title	Run time	Original release date	Notes
44	"Bawdy Basement Belligerence"	03:53:18	January 5, 2023	Tailesin Jaffe is absent this episode
As they come back, people are searching Ebenold's house, and eventually an air elemental finds the group in the basement. They try to make it look like an orgy, but do not convince the search party so instead they try to flee. The house is very crowded, so they end up knocking all the enemies unconscious, and letting the air elemental flee, before being able to get out of the house. They take the unconscious mage and head to a storage near the dock to investigate him. Using magic, they make the mage, Tuldus, tell them he is part of the Ruby Vanguard, a group that despises the gods and wants to unleash Predathos. Thull works with them, Ira is a loose thread, but Ludinus Da'Leth of the Cerberus Assembly is their leader. Piercing his mind, Imogen confirms there are three machines in the Hellcatch, the Shadowfell and Feywild, which Tuldus calls Malleus Keys, and they are important to their goals this coming Apogee Solstice. Imogen messages Planerider Ryn, who wants to take the captive for interrogation, and then tells Ashton they should meet up.
45	"Ominous Lectures"	03:35:02	January 12, 2023	–
They collect Ashton, who had seen Violet, a fixer, and was afraid she was after the party. Talking to Violet, Ashton had said too much and thus had to join in a kidnap to prevent being blackmailed. Once reunited, FCG and Laudna go to professor Vitro Isham, who looks into FCG and installs a little baking compartment inside them. Imogen and Fearne head to Professor Kadija Sumal, who confirms Otohan and Liliana are Exaltant, extraordinary Ruidusborn, just like Imogen. In their dreams they could communicate with Reilora, crimson entities most likely from Ruidus. As they are talking, Ludinus Da'Leth walks in and feebleminds Sumal so that she hands him the remainder of the Omen Archive. He recognizes Imogen and can see Fearne is Ruidusborn too, and they talk briefly before he leaves. Everyone heads towards Sumal's office, where they call Ryn, who teleports them into the Feywild, to the Harrowcall Fens, where Fearne's grandma lives. They walk through a dense swamp, where the flowers react to song, before reaching a massive willow-like tree. Fearne rushes in to hug Nana Morri.
46	"Night at the Ligament Manor"	04:18:46	January 26, 2023	Aired on the last Thursday of January as an exception.
Bells Hells talk to Nana Morri over a cocktail, they meet Peepers and Sweet Pea and Fearne shows everyone her room. They peek into Nana's collection of oddities, and when she touches Ashton's glass skull, it flickers and sparks oddly. Everyone explains what happened during their day before they head to bed. FCG connects themself and Laudna to Imogen, so that when she dreams, they will join her. While dreaming, Imogen goes through a red portal and sees her mother near the Key at the excavation site north of Yios. When she talks to her mother, her mother pushes her out of the dream. Laudna gets stuck briefly but wakes up as well. Next morning, Nana gifts some Harrowcall Veils and a Gloomscale breastplate to Fearne before she tells them how to get to the Shiver Keep on the Sablecast Grounds, and where the closest portal back to Exandria is. They head out, and after a while meet three centaurs who want to take them captive and who animate a tree to help them do so. The group however quickly knock them down, the witches completely obliterating one guy, with Imogen accidentally spouting fog from her mouth after doing so.
47	"The Fey Key"	04:20:21	February 2, 2023	–
The party reaches an area where there are large sentry pillars, which they dart around. While a watch party is nearby, Ashton gets stuck in a bloodthirsty puddle. Through clever cooperation they still get by unseen, and soon reach the wall of the Shiver Keep, which is guarded by both guards and eremads. Using invisibility and their portable hole they cleverly sneak inside, where they see Thull talk to some fey commander before both leave. Orym and Laudna invisibly sneak up to the Malleus Key, and Fearne joins them as a tiny monkey. Crawling inside, they cannot find anything that looks very important, so they just throw some dynamite inside before they start blowing up the energy cores on the outside. Fearne lights the whole machine on fire, which causes a massive explosion. This notifies Sorrowlord Zathuda to return to the keep on Gloamglut, a fey dragon. Dashing towards the gate, the party gets attacked by the dragon, and Fearne briefly gets knocked unconscious, but they all manage to make it into the brambles just outside the gate.
48	"An Exit Most Fraught"	03:55:30	February 9, 2023	–
Everyone starts stealthily moving westward, avoiding the searching gaze and occasional fire breath of the dragon overhead. Slightly desperate, Imogen asks Nana Morri for help, and soon a giant crowlike creature starts attacking Gloamglut. Using the distracting, the group reaches the portal back to Exandria. It is guarded by Terrosh the Lidless Slumber, who demands gifts from them, which must be accompanied by a rhyme. Everyone eventually succeeds, getting thrown back into a forest in the Taloned Highlands. As Imogen reaches out to Ryn, they learn the Key in the Shadowfell is being attacked by the Verity, and Ryn might be in trouble at the one in Marquet. They start hiking towards Gelvaan the next day, before Imogen has FCG, Laudna and Chetney join her in a dream to find Ryn. They find her, petrified, at the Malleus Key, but before they can wake up, Thull sees Chetney and FCG and pierces their minds painfully. The following afternoon, Bells Hells arrives at Imogen's hometown. They talk to Relvin, Imogen's father, about her mother, and he gives her a locket Liliana used to wear, before the party gets picked up by their skyship.
49	"The Aurora Grows"	05:01:46	February 16, 2023	–
While journeying to Bassuras, the group contacts possible allies, Ira being among them. At night, Imogen contacts her mother in her dreams. Liliana shows Imogen the freedom they might enjoy after the Ruby's plans succeed before pushing her away again. Laudna and Ashton have a chat, and Fearne and Orym discuss what they should do if Imogen decides to change sides. A storm briefly sets them off course, but they eventually reach the Calloway Hideaway. Ira explains he wants to destroy the Key because he was fired from the project. From the telescope, they can look at the Key, which blasts out anti-magic every minute. During a quick trip to Bassuras they buy some potions and magic items. They get back on the skyship to head towards the Tishtan excavation but are met with a terrible magic dust storm which causes them to stop and do repairs. The next day, a giant fiery bird starts hunting them in yet another storm, but Fearne manages to turn into a goldfish, which then gets carried away by the wind. Keyleth notifies the group that the Ashari will join Bells Hells. The group approaches the Tishtan excavation, a day before the solstice.
50	"Red Moon Rising"	03:51:43	March 2, 2023	–
Bells Hells drops of the skyship crew in a cave before further approaching the site. Fearne, FCG, Ira and captain Xandis stay on board while the others leave the ship. They see a crashed skyship from Vasselheim as they get to the sinkhole, and once close try to blend in the with Ruby Vanguard and Paragon's Call. Still, Imogen cannot convince the Vanguard that her friends are allies, and so they have to fight some, including a golem Warden which is hollow inside. As the fight finishes, Imogen is pulled back by Beauregard Lionett. Beau and Caleb Widogast, her wizard friend, have been following Ludinus' steps for a decade and they decide to join forces. The two damaged the key in the Shadowfell and have been working with Ryn. They discuss their plans for some time before splitting up to head further inside.
51	"The Apogee Solstice"	04:37:04	March 9, 2023	–
Fearne and FCG decide they should leave Xandis and Ira and join the others instead. FCG manages to connect themself to the slayed Warder, and starts controlling it, hiding some friends inside, and accompanied by Imogen. They see two anti-magic devices and find a cavern with power cores. Inside the cavern, they fight some guards. Otohan starts approaching, but at that moment Beau and Caleb blow up the anti-magic devices and Otohan rushes back. Using the consternation, FCG tries to pick up Ryn, but instead collapses a wall and Ludinus deactivates the Warder they were controlling. Rushing into the main area, the party sees Beauregard and Caleb, captured, and Ludinus changes time so that hours go by in seconds. The skyship crashes down, but Ludinus protects the Key. Imogen pleas with her mother, while Ira blows up some more cores before getting banished by Liliana. Keyleth arrives but immediately gets beaten heavily by Otohan. Duskmaven champion Vax'ildan shows up to protect her but gets cast into the machine by Liliana. Ludinus activates it, and everything turns white. Laudna, Ashton and Orym are thrust in a gorge, while Chetney, FCG, Imogen and Fearne find themselves in the Crystalsands Tundra on Wildemount.
52	"Far From the Others"	03:48:35	March 16, 2023	Marisha Ray, Liam O'Brien, and Taliesin Jaffe are absent this episode as players. Guest stars Christian Navarro and Aabria Iyengar.
Chetney realizes they are close to Uthodurn, and thus the four of them start traveling there. They are unable to contact the others due to inference from the Apogee Solstice. As they are bedding down for the night, a lizard like monster attacks them badly. Thankfully, a gnome called Deanna, who is Chetney's ex, and an aeormaton called FRIDA help them out. Both were dead for a long time before being woken up again and have mixed feelings towards the gods. Imogen notices the markings on her arms have spread and are starting to turn red. The next evening, they realize they have not seen Ruidus in the sky. Through dreaming, Imogen tries to reach out to Laudna, while FCG and Fearne join her, but instead their vision is pulled towards the Malleus Key, which has a beam that is cutting through the divine mesh around Ruidus and bringing Reilora folk to Exandria. Imogen feels a strong urge to go towards Ruidus, but Fearne slaps Imogen awake before she can give in. Meanwhile, Chetney is overcome by the full moon and starts hunting. FRIDA tries to get them back, but Chetney bites him before calming down and running away for the remainder of the night.
53	"Ripples"	04:02:46	March 23, 2023	Marisha Ray, Liam O'Brien, and Taliesin Jaffe are absent this episode as players. Guest stars Christian Navarro and Aabria Iyengar.
Once Chetney returns and apologizes, the group makes for Uthodurn, reaching it just before sundown. The magical lights in the city are mostly off, and when the group goes to the Vellum Steeple, a place of learning, Scribewarden Ressia Uvesic explains most divination magic is not working, as well as some other types of enchantments. As they are talking, they feel a loud rumble. Rushing further down into the city, the gate to the Grand Disc is closed, but they sneak in nevertheless. There, a giant bull statue of a Great Beast of Veluthil has come alive. The creature rams Fearne, but she charms it and FCG gives it the ability to speak and understand language. They learn that Umudara is a Sentinel Beast from Molaesmyr and wants to go back home. Through magic, they calm the guard of the city and the people, so Umudara can be brought to the top, where they send him southward. Meanwhile, Chetney steals some gems from the royal thrones before taking an escape route back to the streets, so he can be looked after by the people on the streets.
54	"Treacherous Toys"	04:18:33	April 6, 2023	Marisha Ray, Liam O'Brien, and Taliesin Jaffe are absent this episode as players. Guest stars Christian Navarro and Aabria Iyengar.
After a joyful entry back into the city the group head to Deanna's for the night. Deanna and Imogen have a quick chat before FCG joins FRIDA in their dream. They see a round Exandria, and FRIDA looks to their metal hands before seeing human legs. FCG sees there is a child form partially embedded in FRIDA. The next morning, they head to Chetney's old workplace. Now called the D&O Toy Emporium, his old boss Oltgar introduced metal toys in the place under Drixlitch's influence, which angered Chetney. After enchantments failed however, the Whizzle Cages containing pymon firebugs unlocked. The party goes in to fight the firebugs, as well as the Drixlitch's pet craskkalid, which has turned into a giant monster because of the heat. Fearne however polymorphs it back into a larva and releases it outside the city gates. They find out Drixlitch has been using child labor to make the toys and has plans to take the company from Oltgar. Chetney talks go Oltgar, tells him he should leave town and start anew, and leave Drixlitch with a mess of a shop. Oltgar agrees.
55	"Hope Within History"	03:35:16	April 13, 2023	Marisha Ray, Liam O'Brien, and Taliesin Jaffe are absent this episode as players. Guest stars Christian Navarro and Aabria Iyengar.
The party heads to the Citadel for a meeting with the king and queen, where they are proclaimed Protectors of the Diarchy. They learn that Ludinus used to live in Molaesmyr, was already a god-hater, and that Molaesmyr was destroyed by a magic explosion under the city, under a ruddy moon during a solstice. At the Vellum, they learn Ludinus created the Cerberus Assembly after the Eve of the Crimson Midnight, when he stopped a mage battle in the Dwendalian Empire. Meanwhile, FRIDA and FCG headed to Jaquoby Macyl, but first they confess they love each other. Jaquoby attaches the armor that was granted by the royal family to FCG. He also notices inside FCG's face are the words Faithful Care-Giver. Chetney checks up on Imogen and Deanna quickly visits the Dawnfather temple before the group meets at Catlyn Delafin's Clothier, where they get new outfits. Once evening hits, Fearne goes to the alter of the Wildmother and asks her to tell Orym they are okay, before heading back to Deanna's, where FRIDA and FCG spend some time together in their bedroom. The next morning, the group picks up some mountain goats before heading out to Molaesmyr.
56	"By Goat or By Boat"	04:10:39	April 20, 2023	Marisha Ray, Liam O'Brien, and Taliesin Jaffe are absent this episode as players. Guest stars Christian Navarro and Aabria Iyengar.
They party travels through the mountains for a few days, scaring off two frost giants towards the end of their track, before they reach the river. Before bedding down, FCG sits down to commune with the Changebringer, who shows him that she has been looking after him, and confirms she could use some help. She stays at a distance however throughout this all. The next morning, they kill Jerry, Deanna's goat and leave the others behind before getting on the raft they had made the previous day. As night hits, the party gets noticed by a bog wretch who is accompanied by some pixies. It is quickly slayed however, and the next day goes by uneventfully. The following morning, Deanna and Fearne get hit by some life-stealing miasma, but they reach the ruins of Molaesmyr. They sense predators ahead, so Imogen sends a thought eater ahead, which gets destroyed by an aberration of an elk.
57	"The Sorrow of Molaesmyr"	03:37:32	May 4, 2023	Marisha Ray, Liam O'Brien, and Taliesin Jaffe are absent this episode as players. Guest stars Christian Navarro and Aabria Iyengar.
The party starts stealthily moving into the city, but when FCG casts a spell and therefore speaks, the party gets attacked by ghosts. Chetney briefly gets possessed, but they fight them off quickly. They head towards the Gildhollow tower, where Ludinus used to live. FRIDA stands on the lookout for a bit, but when they try to get back to the group they fall through a bridge. They are followed by the Wolf-King, a wolf body with five torsos and heads, but the party creates a distraction to gain some ground and since the aberration cannot climb well it leaves the party alone when they reach the tower. Inside the place is heavily looted, but they do find some old notes. Chetney however wakes up a giant flesh mound.
58	"Escape from the Past"	04:04:22	May 11, 2023	Marisha Ray, Liam O'Brien, and Taliesin Jaffe are absent this episode as players. Guest stars Christian Navarro and Aabria Iyengar.
Everyone starts attacking the creature, but Fearne gets swallowed and nearly dies. She is pulled out and healed, and when Imogen gets swallowed later Fearne burns the creature to death. They escape the tower while stealing a bag they found in a secret compartment. They manage to avoid all the creatures of Molaesmyr and find a hidden hollow deep within the forest to sleep the night. They determine that they possess a Bag of Holding, within it they find the Staff of Dark Odyssey, a Feywild tuning, a strange leather object and notes discussing Ruidus, the gems under Molaesmyr and the harness that is in there. FCG and Imogen dive into FRIDA's brain and reach a memory where FRIDA is protecting the Factorum. They remember the Key was a repurposed version of the Malleus Factorum, the Aeorian god slaying device. Chetney gives FRIDA and Deanna gifts. Chetney and Deanna they finally spend some real time together (while Fearne joins). The next morning, FCG asks the Changebringer where they should go. The Changebringer tells FCG “the Red End stirs in its slumber, do not let it wake”. The Dawnfather tells Deanna the same. The group uses the found Staff to teleport to Jrusar.
59	"Somewhere Out There"	04:10:11	May 18, 2023	Ashley Johnson, Laura Bailey, Travis Willingham and Sam Riegel are absent this episode as players. Guest stars Aimee Carrero, Utkarsh Ambudkar and Emily Axford.
Laudna, Orym, Deni$e Bembachula, and Ashton are transported by some unknown mechanism upon a ledge partway down the Spectrum Gorge in Issylra, near enough to the Hellcatch to see Ruidus far on the horizon. After extricating themselves, they find Bor'Dor Dog'Son sitting near a campfire burning the farmer he murdered. The party never catches on, not even after Bor'Dor attacks Deni$e with a most fortunately weak lightning bolt. After they are joined by Prism Grimpoppy emerging from the forest before they are attacked by a group of sentient plants, which the party easily defeats as Bor'Dor feigns cowardice in a fetal position. Around the campfire, Bor'Dor lies about his experiences to Prism, Deni$e and Orym talk about Dariax, and Laudna speaks to Ashton about politics. The party continues traveling through the forest and all look upon the suspended red moon Ruidus.
60	"Faith or Famine"	04:13:18	June 1, 2023	Ashley Johnson, Laura Bailey, Travis Willingham and Sam Riegel are absent this episode as players. Guest stars Aimee Carrero, Utkarsh Ambudkar and Emily Axford.
61	"Crisis of Faith"	04:52:56	June 8, 2023	Ashley Johnson, Laura Bailey, Travis Willingham and Sam Riegel are absent this episode as players. Guest stars Aimee Carrero, Utkarsh Ambudkar and Emily Axford.
62	"A Long Walk of Reflection"	03:43:45	June 15, 2023	Ashley Johnson, Laura Bailey, Travis Willingham and Sam Riegel are absent this episode as players. Guest stars Aimee Carrero, Utkarsh Ambudkar and Emily Axford.
The party leaves Hearthdell in the morning with the wind cougar summoned by Abaddina to journey to Irriam Canyon, where a druid who can teleport the party to Jrusar lives. The journey is uneventful except for an encounter with a fallen petrified denizen of the Astral Sea from which Ashton extracts a Ring of Volcanic Flesh. When the party reaches the depths of the canyon, they spot the blue flowers they were looking for past a living hill that they stealth past. Near the entrance of the cave, the party collects some crystals of magic refraction before entering the recently abandoned cave proper from within such Orym spots a face peering from the ceiling.
63	"A Haunted Past"	04:05:26	June 22, 2023	Ashley Johnson, Laura Bailey, Travis Willingham and Sam Riegel are absent this episode as players. Guest stars Aimee Carrero, Utkarsh Ambudkar and Emily Axford.
The party face a mysterious entity named Evithorir. After defeating it, they free the druid Hevestro who explains he is the guardian of Oma-Dua, an ancient druid who previously sealed away Evithorir. Hevestro also explains that the Hishari was a cult which destroyed itself; Abaddina was previously a member and Asthon was born into this cult. After Hevestro leaves, Deni$e violently confronts Bor'Dor about what she suspects he has hidden from the rest of the party. Bor'Dor's lies begin to fall apart, forcing him to reveal that he has been a member of the Ruby Vanguard the entire time. He lashes out, firing an acidic blast at the entire party and knocking Prism unconscious. Orym heals Prism as Laudna unleashes her inner demons. In the ensuing fight, Laudna kills Bor'Dor for his betrayal. Deni$e waits for Laudna to be escorted away by Ashton before burying the remains in a small grave marked with a rock. The next day, Prism discovers Dariax is in Westruun via scrying so Hevestro opens a magical tree portal to that city for Deni$e. After confirming the other Bells Hells members are in Jrusar via Prism's Scry, Hevestro magically transports the rest of the group there.
64	"Reunited"	04:16:20	July 6, 2023	Guest stars Christian Navarro, Aabria Iyengar and Emily Axford.
Deanna, FRIDA, FCG, Imogen, Fearne, and Chetney find themselves teleported to the wrong mountainous city. The eisfurran inhabitants of the city are terrified that non-birdfolk found the hidden city and escort the party blindfolded into a nearby forest. After FCG very nearly experiences a psychotic break, the party rests for another day before successfully teleporting to Jrusar. The party arrives at midnight in the Smolder Spire, Ruidus suspended by a red beam ominously on the horizon causing the locals to be much more wary and cautious than they would ordinarily be. They eventually make their way to the Spire by Fire. Meanwhile, Prism, Orym, Ashton and Laudna arrive in Jrusar leading to Bells Hells being reunited at the Spire by Fire. While sharing their respective adventures, the Wildemount group is horrified by the events experienced by the Issylra group. This discussion also leads Deanna to have more doubts about the Dawnfather. Deanna scrys on Keyleth showing she is alive in Zephrah but still badly injured. Deanna, FRIDA, and Prism are tasked with researching more on Predathos while Bells Hells continues on. FCG stays with the Bells Hells to focus on preserving the Changebringer; FRIDA kisses FCG before the three depart.
65	"A Path of Vengeance"	04:07:21	July 13, 2023	–
Following the suggestion of Orym and Ashton, Bells Hells takes time to regroup and relax. Ashton and FCG visit Milo. Laudna and Imogen look in on Zhudanna and reconcile their differences leading to their first kiss. While getting Zhudanna's groceries, they stumble across a recording of Ludinus's speech emanating from an enchanted object placed to rouse the citizens of Jrusar into following him. Orym, Chetney, and Fearne are updated on local events by Ajit Dayal. They then make their way to the Duskmaven's temple, where they experience a shared vision sent by the Matron of Ravens depicting a screaming black sphere set within the Malleus Key under the held red moon. The three groups reconvene in the Spire by Fire. Over the course of the next day, the party magically scries on Liliana and Ira – Liliana is walking through a city with Ludinus on the red moon while Ira is pushing through a dust storm somewhere on Ruidus when he comes across a building inhabited by a Reilora and enters into the building before the scry ends. Ashton picks up his upgraded hammer from Milo. The party sleeps for another night and in the morning, Imogen teleports them to Zephrah.
66	"Aid of the Tempest"	04:43:29	July 20, 2023	–
The party teleports to Zephrah using Imogen's Staff of Dark Odyssey and are ambushed by members of Orym's tribe, the Air Ashari. They stand down when Orym's sister-in-law recognizes him and the party is escorted to meet with Keyleth, the leader of Zephrah. Keyleth is heavily afflicted with a toxin that prevents her wounds from healing and asks the party to look for an antidote in the Grey Valley, a northern withered wilderness. Before leaving, the party meets Alma, Orym's mother, and orders clothing in the village. Maeve gives Ashton a backpack to fill with blue flowers and transports the party to the Grey Valley. The party travels through the petrified wood using Pâté to scout ahead. When they spot a large collection of blue flowers, Chetney is ambushed by an abyssal Devourer Demon and zombified Ashari after separating from the group to pick flowers. The party defeats the demon and rests to consider their next move.
67	"Bloody Flowers"	04:47:31	August 3, 2023	–
The party sets out again across the wastes for blue flowers. Shortly after spotting a structure a half mile off, they are attacked by a pair of flying demons which they dispatch with ease. As the party notices that they are approaching a defensive bastion which been beset upon and destroyed by abyssal creatures, they see several cages holding mostly Ashari prisoners and a devil that is attacking the abyssals. After the abyssals are defeated, the devil Teven Klask converses with Fearne and the prisoners are freed. Two are worshipers of the Platinum Dragon who were defending this outpost and the other three are Ashari, one of whom is Orym's sister-in-law Baernie. Teven convinces Fearne to become an acolyte of his god Asmodeus and the party rests for the night in an artificial sealed cave created by Baernie.
68	"For the Tempest"	03:48:26	August 10, 2023	–
During the night, Imogen accidentally visits Ruidus in spiritual form, where she learns of animals on the moon and speaks to her mother, who tells Imogen that Liliana is dependent on Ludinus in some way and makes clear her intention to go along with his plan. The dream ends and the party manages to teleport themselves and five companions back to Zephrah in one casting. The party takes two bags of blue flowers to Keyleth's home and allow the Ashari herbalists to concoct an ointment that heals Keyleth. Keyleth and the party share many facts about the world. Imogen summons a spiritual projection of a Reilora that speaks to Imogen about the nature of Ruidus and Predathos and of the wonder of Exandria that is not present in the red stormridden deserts of Ruidus. Ashton uses Keyleth's insight of influence by Primordial blood infused in him by his father's cataclysm. The party learns the location of the tree Efterin bragged about controlling before destroying his family and village in a possibly misguided attempt to gain power and the party makes plans to visit it. Orym is received as a hero and Keyleth titles him as Savior Blade of the Tempest.
69	"Nice"	03:57:56	August 17, 2023	–
The party splits up to enjoy Zephrah. Ashton has a supernatural experience during a panic attack and receives his new outfit. Orym, Fearne, and FCG go shopping and visit the grave of Orym's family with Orym's mother in law Nel. Laudna and Chetney go hang-gliding while Imogen flies unassisted from a safe distance. Before the party settles in for the night, Laudna is spoken to by Delilah Briarwood. The next morning, Keyleth and the party are teleported by the Staff of Dark Odyssey to Yios to find Dancer, FCG's former owner, whom FCG and Imogen convince to repair and discover the uses of Ludinus's old harness. Dancer reveals that she does not have experience with the runes in question and will need to collaborate with Imahara Joe, an artificer who lives in Bassuras, to help the party in this way. While looking for a tree large enough for Keyleth to transport the party, the party encounters and assists FCG in killing Gargo, an undead bird who was abandoned by an unnamed necromancer and can be killed only by the Destroy Undead spell FCG casts. Keyleth transports the party, Dancer, and herself to Bassuras. The tethered red moon illuminates the town.
70	"Embattled in Bassuras"	04:38:25	August 24, 2023	–
The party arrives in Bassuras to see a skyship be hit by an unknown weapon. Consulting with the locals reveals that although explosions are commonplace, skyships are very rare. Three are outside the Carmine Curtain and many others have come through in the last week since the Apogee Solstice, some also attacked. Keyleth explains that she might have friends in the skyships and flies up to meet them. The rest of the party goes to Imahara Joe's, where they find him and a friend held hostage by Paragon's Call. The party attacks, killing multiple soldiers including the leader, General Ratanish. The party, rescuing Imahara Joe and another tinkerer Verda, escapes the growing investigation. Ashton and Imogen split to the All-Minds-Burn, a hive mind of drugged cultists. Justi, an old friend of Ashton, allows them to meet the All-Minds-Burn, a great gelatinous tower of mind, itself and Imogen communicates with it and of Imogen's memories it learns of the Red Moon and wishes to see for itself. After Imogen receives a splice of the Mind, the party is transported by Keyleth to the Shattered Teeth to learn of Ashton while Dancer, Joe, and Verda travel to Whitestone to repair Ludinus's harness.
71	"Mist and Whimsy"	04:17:51	September 7, 2023	–
The party arrives on the island of Slival within the center of a forest. They explore the island, noticing some curious jungle creatures and a distant dragon-like creature roaming the skies. The entirety of the Shattered Teeth are entrenched in deep fog and every island moves constantly, making navigation difficult and isolating the islands. Looking for Jirana, Keyleth's friend who will help guide them to Evontra'vir, the party circles the southwest portion of Slival and encounters the Dolabos who fear the Bari Mondolo, land dwelling larva of serpents living beneath the ocean. The Dolabos say they are protected by Toriz, whom Keyleth named just as the party entered the Shattered Teeth without explanation. The Dolabos love fire but cannot produce it on their own, and they ask the party to build a fire to attract Toriz. The fire attracts a Bari Mondolo who fights the party before Toriz, a giant toad, appears and throws the creature into the sea. As the toad opens its mouth, the party sees that inside is a living space containing the tortoise-kin Jirana. She tells the party of many ways to reach Kalutha, where Evontra'vir rests, and they choose to summon the dread pirate Novos.
72	"Phantasmal Parley"	03:55:02	September 14, 2023	–
After Toriz deposits the party on the north shore, they realize they could use the hole to assist in the coming battle if they remove the dead bodies of Paragon's call first. Imogen is made up to look like her mother, and FCG casts Speak with Dead on a lower ranked druid that Imogen asks practice questions on to learn what to ask Ratanish. They learn some information before Imogen tires and Ashton throws all the bodies into the sea to cover the party's tracks if they return to Bassuras. Chetney dips the compass into and a great ship appears out of the growing mist and skeletal pirates jump into the sea and begin to attack the party. During the battle, after escaping FCG's Turn Undead, Laudna manages to reach the undead captain Urlu Novos and strike up a conversation. She convinces the captain to stop trying to kill the party and transport them to Kalutha when they give him the compass. Everyone peacefully piles onto the ship, and the two crews meet. The skeletons have little in common with the party, given their inability to eat and drink, but the combined group has fun nonetheless gambling the day away.
73	"Kindling the Spirits"	04:27:26	September 21, 2023	–
During the two day journey to the isle of Kalutha on the ghost ship, FCG and Fearne fail to magically ascertain the whereabouts of Caleb Widogast and Beauregard Lionett. FCG does determine that D is on the Menagerie Coast. Laudna tells the party of her ability to consume the souls of her enemies – she assumes Delilah gains power from that. FCG tries different magics to make contact with Delilah but these attempts fail. After noticing members of the skeleton crew have designs etched onto their bones, Ashton convinces the resident artist to do something similar on his rock-like skin with ink found by Chetney. Fearne spends a night with Captain Novos; while spooning, she takes permanent damage after agreeing to share her warmth which causes ice to melt from the captain's body. The ship's navigator Cyrillia is angered by Fearne spending time with the captain but Fearne manages to convince Cyrillia to take her own shot with the captain. Afterwards, everyone notices steam coming from the captain's quarters. Bells Hells throw a goodbye party before departing. After they land upon the island, the party fights a huge two-headed worm-like beast as they look for Evontra'vir, the Tree of Atrophy.
74	"Roots Between Worlds"	03:47:08	October 5, 2023	–
The party spends days traversing the jungle before they discover a chasm that descends into darkness. Utilizing various magics, the party leap into it and eventually reach the canopy of a tree. Ashton calls out to the tree which reveals a face that asks what they seek. In response to Ashton identifying as an abandoned Hishari child, Evontra'vir states Ashton is the son of Efterin who the tree led to the shard of Ka'Mort, primordial Empress of Earth. It was Efterin's destiny to create Ashton who contains that shard. Evontra'vir explains that it was originally a Gau Drashari and a protector of Toramunda, a Mount Ygora settlement located on Domunas, before it was split into terrestrial Cathmoíra and the flying city of Avalir. At the start of the Calamity, Domunas was destroyed which created the Shattered Teeth. It also reveals that the shard of Rau'shan, primordial Emperor of Fire, is on a nearby island; they must recover and bestow its power. Evontra'vir cannot determine their right path but grants them a vision of a future where the gods leave; the party determines Ludinus should be stopped. Evontra'vir then shatters a spying Scry orb before rushing them through a magical passageway.
75	"An Ancient Flame"	03:55:26	October 12, 2023	–
The party delves into tight and twisted caverns. After a slow, careful descent, they discover a lava pit with fire creatures. Fearne communicates with them – they recognize "Rau'Shan" as their creator. Ashton, with Fearne following, jump into the pit to retrieve a small glowing object–a shard of what remains of Rau'Shan. They sense that the shard is looking for a vessel. As the party decides they need to regroup with Imahara Joe, who has Ludinus Da'leth's harness which can transfer magical and life essence, they are attacked by members of the Ruby Vanguard, Reilorans, and what appears to be Ludinus himself. Ludinus initially attempts to converse with the group before pivoting to magically restraining Fearne to separate her from the party as a hostage. In the ensuing fight, Bells Hells eliminates all of the opposing party except for Ludnius. He attempts to cast a 9th-level spell, the highest spell casting level, but fails to stop Laudna's Counterspell. Ludinus then walks into the lava, saying he at least has more information, and dissolves into snow. The party realize this isn't the real Ludinus but recover an opal that was in the forehead of the simulacrum. FCG teleports them to Whitestone.
76	"A Gathering of Heroes"	04:01:04	October 19, 2023	–
In Whitestone, the party reveal the shard of Rau'shan and their encounter with Ludinus to the gathered tinkerers. They learn from Allura Vysoren that the harness, the Quintessence Array, has been repaired. Testing it reveals when an enchanted object or creature is placed within the funnel, the object/creature loses its enchantment while the user gains benefits depending on the rarity of what is absorbed. They recall that Evontra'vir stated Ashton could be destroyed if the shards intermingle. Allura agrees that while survival is possible, it could also rend him "into a thousand pieces". Fearne is suggested as an alternative candidate to absorb the shard. Allura inspects Ashton's skull revealing that the crystal is dunamantic with him being almost a "half-beacon". During a war council, everyone is updated on the current known status of the Hellcatch Valley and missing allies. Afterwards, Chetney, Orym, and Ashton visit the Raven Queen temple – they receive a vision of her in chains which break as the three climb them. At the Changebringer's temple, FCG receives a vision where she, with crimson tears, emphasizes the danger the gods are in. This is tonally different from previous encounters; FCG senses she is trying a different tactic.
77	"The Promise and the Price"	04:30:06	November 9, 2023	–
While exploring the castle, Laudna, Imogen, and Fearne discover a torture laboratory and ghosts via a closed off passageway. After conflict with the ghosts, the three hear Delilah's voice. Laudna's life depends on Vecna since she is bound to Delilah so their interests are aligned against Predathos. Laudna wants more direct support but Delilah requires power sacrificed in exchange. Delilah also encourages the darkness and otherworldliness in Fearne and Imogen, respectively, before vanishing. Everyone takes the morning to themselves. Fearne tells Ashton she believes the fire shard of Rau'shan should go to him which Ashton supports even though there is a death risk and they would have to trick the others. Regrouping at the castle's war room, Bells Hells brainstorm with Allura, Percy and Cassandra on their mission to cross the Bloody Bridge to scout Ruidus. Fearne and Ashton suggest the absorption ritual for the shard before the mission. Atop the ziggurat, the party initially give them privacy to start the ritual before they realize something has gone wrong. Parts of Ashton shatter off – his survival comes down to his Ring of Temporal Salvation and Fearne's Aura of Life. Asthon's arm reforms with a molten rock appearance. He falls unconscious.
78	"Fractures"	04:00:41	November 16, 2023	Liam O'Brien is absent this episode.
Fearne confesses she was aware Ashton was going to attempt to absorb the Rau'shan shard. Ashton regains consciousness and expels the shard which has permanently damaged him. Almost everyone scatters in anger. Chetney talks Fearne down who admits she never wanted the shard and fears bad versions of herself seen in visions. Afterwards, Fearne seeks guidance at the Matron of Ravens temple. Laudna flees into the woods to her old broken hut and regresses while Delilah reassures her. Imogen is panicked because she failed to find Laudna, however, both Laudna and Fearne return in the morning with Laudna informing the other two that Delilah wants the shard but she thinks it should be Fearne's. Ashton spends time apologizing to various members of the party. While there is a ticking clock, Allura agrees to Plane Shift them to Ligament Manor as FCG believes the party needs to regroup and Morrigan's control of her Feywild domain should prevent them from missing time in the Material Plane. Morrigan tells Fearne while she can influence fate, she does not have direct control. She thinks Fearne is a beautiful paradox whose true heritage drew her attention and encourages her to seek her mother's secret.
79	"To Hurt Is to Heal"	03:59:18	December 7, 2023	–
Birdie discloses that during her time in the Unseelie Court she was Sorrowlord Athion Zathuda's lover who ensured Fearne would be born during a Ruidus flare. Birdie and Oleander later escaped the Court and, by leaving Fearne under Morrigan's protection, she was kept safe from Zathuda's agents. Before the team building exercises, Allura discusses the political structure of the Feywild and Morrigan's role. The first exercise is Honesty – the party must volunteer truths to build a path out of an unclimbable chasm which results in the party sharing their insecurities connected to both backstories and current events. The second exercise is Communication – Morrigan blinds several characters before placing them at the top of winding paths where the other party members are limited to verbally helping them navigate. While they successfully guide Chetney and Imogen, Ashton falls into a chasm after being stung by wasps as a consequence of the navigators raising their voices. Morrigan allows them one more try but introduces the risk of death if Orym falls from the path. By successfully completing these exercises, they are rewarded two magic items. The final exercise will be Trust – Morrigan explains two of the party will be replaced by doppelgangers.
80	"A Test of Trust"	03:50:42	December 14, 2023	–
The party explores a fey ruin looking for three ivory branches. Several creatures attack them or try to steal branches back. Eventually all three branches are placed in a large pool and it is revealed that none of the party was replaced with any doppelgangers. Everyone wakes from a short nap in Nana Morri's living room and the three items won are sitting on the coffee table. After over an hour of discussion, the party decides to allow the consumption of the Shard Of Rau'Shan by Fearne. Morrigan, all the creatures of the forest, Allura, Fearne, and everyone else gather at the treetop garden. Fearne puts on the harness and gets ready. Although looking away, Laudna is alerted by the presence of the shard but manages to restrain herself. After Chetney places the item within the funnel, FCG uses Ashton's life force to sustain Fearne before turning berserk halfway thru. Laudna, who has recovered, destroys the plant life and reveals the skeletons of Morrigan's enemies to further sustain Fearne. FCG is restrained by Chetney, Morrigan, and Orym. When the ritual is done, Ashton and Fearne shake hands, transforming Ashton as well. They explore their new elemental forms together.
81	"The Eve of the Red Moon"	03:36:06	December 21, 2023	–
Ashton finds he has the power to merge with natural rock and soil. Fearne floats a few inches above the ground and passively burns those who attack her. As they are gallivanting in the woods, Chetney visits Nana and makes a deal for eternal fame in exchange for bringing a piece of Predathos home for Morrigan to consume. During the night, Imogen visits Ruidus with Laudna, FCG, Ashton, and Orym. She descends deep with the moon, meeting Predathos after hearing her mother cry out for her safety. As Imogen awakes, she feels a deep desire to return to the entity. Those who followed noticed water and strange life in the caverns within Ruidus. After everyone else returns to bed, Orym, inspired by Chetney, finds Morrigan and pledges himself to eternal servitude for a little help in the battles ahead. In the morning, Allura transports herself and the party to the western command below Ruidus with temporal assistance from the Fatestitcher. They meet with the gathered leaders and concoct a plan to distract the enemy while the party sneaks onto Ruidus. The distraction costs the enemy significant military assets as Keyleth transports the party to the recently deserted southern entrance.

=== 2024 ===
List of episodes in 2024
Episode	Title	Run time	Original release date	Notes
82	"Rush for the Bloody Bridge"	04:19:40	January 11, 2024	–
The party soon stealthily reaches the outer edge of the sinkhole. They manage to distract or kill the guards before beginning their descent. Most of the citadel has emptied to deal with the attack above. Several soldiers pay the party no heed as they rush past. Soon, the party encounters a cave that contains two guards and a prisoner. After the guards are killed and the prisoner is freed, he gives his name as Ishto. Ishto is a paladin of Erathis and wants to help out however he can. The party decides to have him hold his own shackles as a slight deception to enter the area directly below the central tower. Ishto also informs the party of sigils at the base of the sinkhole that turned his compatriots to stone. As the party reaches and begins to explore that central area, Chetney uses the Monocle of True Essence to avoid those sigils. Unfortunately, there is no sign of the late Ryn who was petrified many months ago. After reaching the spindly staircase just barely touching the beam's base, the party manages to ascend to Ruidus as Ishto is left behind to defend against the many enemies throughout the area.
83	"Ruidus"	03:54:10	February 1, 2024	–
The Bells Hells are on the moon Ruidus and leave the Bloody Bridge landing pad to figure out their escape plan. They hide from the Ruby Vanguard using FCG and Imogen's magic. They find beasts of burden, with Chetney discovering a shadowy figure waiting for the storm to pass. Imogen and Fearne realize that because they are Ruidusborn they are able to share magic between each other. Imogen reaches out to the God Eater and has a dream of red lights, two looking like Liliana and Fearne, begging to be woken up. She resists the call and wakes up from her dream, informing the group. After debating whether Imogen should attempt to reach out again they find a small livestock farming village. As their mist form wears off they find a figure who Imogen convinces to stay quiet. This figure asks who they are, speaking in Common.
84	"Red Rural Revelations"	03:52:20	February 8, 2024	–
85	"Intense Interrogations"	03:31:28	February 15, 2024	–
86	"Doorways to Darker Depths"	03:58:51	February 22, 2024	–
87	"Arrival at Kreviris"	04:21:33	March 7, 2024	–
88	"Seeking Sedition"	03:42:35	March 14, 2024	–
89	"Divisive Portents"	03:53:59	March 21, 2024	–
90	"Mission Improbable"	04:18:07	April 4, 2024	–
91	"True Heroism"	04:42:56	April 11, 2024	–
92	"Broken Roads"	04:26:27	April 18, 2024	Sam Riegel is absent this episode. Guest stars Anjali Bhimani, Aimee Carrero, Robbie Daymond, Erica Lindbeck, and Aabria Iyengar during the second half of the episode.
93	"Bittersweet Reunions"	04:05:20	May 2, 2024	Sam Riegel is absent this episode. Guest stars Anjali Bhimani, Aimee Carrero, Robbie Daymond, Erica Lindbeck, and Aabria Iyengar during the first half of the episode. Robbie Daymond remains for the second half.
94	"Where The Red Fearne Glows"	03:43:59	May 9, 2024	Sam Riegel is absent this episode. Guest stars Robbie Daymond.
95	"Gathering of Needs"	04:38:44	May 16, 2024	Sam Riegel is absent this episode. Guest stars Robbie Daymond.
96	"Shadows New and Old"	04:06:08	May 23, 2024	Sam Riegel is absent this episode. Guest stars Robbie Daymond.
97	"Ancient Sins"	03:42:04	June 6, 2024	Sam Riegel is absent this episode. Guest stars Robbie Daymond.
98	"The Nox Engine"	03:52:49	June 20, 2024	Live show was recorded on June 15, 2024 at the Greek Theatre. Guest stars Robbie Daymond and Brennan Lee Mulligan.
99	"Downfall: Part One"	04:17:00	July 11, 2024	Matthew Mercer, Marisha Ray, Travis Willingham, Liam O'Brien and Sam Riegel are absent this episode as players. Guest stars Brennan Lee Mulligan, Noshir Dalal, Nick Marini, and Abubakar Salim.
100	"Downfall: Part Two"	04:00:01	July 18, 2024	Matthew Mercer, Marisha Ray, Travis Willingham, Liam O'Brien and Sam Riegel are absent this episode as players. Guest stars Brennan Lee Mulligan, Noshir Dalal, Nick Marini, and Abubakar Salim.
101	"Downfall: Part Three"	06:11:03	July 25, 2024	Matthew Mercer, Marisha Ray, Travis Willingham, Liam O'Brien and Sam Riegel are absent this episode as players. Guest stars Brennan Lee Mulligan, Noshir Dalal, Nick Marini, and Abubakar Salim.
102	"Reconciliation"	04:06:56	August 1, 2024	Guest stars Robbie Daymond.
103	"Cages"	03:47:51	August 8, 2024	Guest stars Robbie Daymond.
104	"The Cradle's Convocation"	04:32:58	August 15, 2024	Guest stars Robbie Daymond.
105	"Collecting Legends"	03:54:11	August 22, 2024	Guest stars Robbie Daymond.
106	"Unseelie Interrupted"	04:11:05	September 5, 2024	Guest stars Robbie Daymond.
107	"Under the Arch Heart's Eye"	04:29:36	September 12, 2024	Guest stars Robbie Daymond and Abubakar Salim.
108	"Looming"	04:18:11	September 19, 2024	Guest stars Robbie Daymond.
109	"A Test of Fate"	04:39:24	October 3, 2024	Guest stars Robbie Daymond.
110	"In the Shadow of War"	04:06:10	October 10, 2024	Guest stars Robbie Daymond.
111	"The Nein Hells"	03:33:30	October 17, 2024	Guest stars Robbie Daymond.
112	"The Assembling of Legends"	04:26:34	October 24, 2024	Guest stars Robbie Daymond.
113	"Assault on the Malleus Key"	05:06:10	November 7, 2024	Guest stars Robbie Daymond.
114	"Fight for the Bloody Bridge"	04:48:07	November 14, 2024	Guest stars Robbie Daymond.
115	"To the Arx Creonum"	04:23:20	November 21, 2024	Guest stars Robbie Daymond.
116	"The Weave Mind"	04:47:30	December 5, 2024	–
117	"Race to the Ruidian Core"	04:37:22	December 12, 2024	Guest stars Robbie Daymond.

=== 2025 ===
Episode	Title	Run time	Original release date	Notes
118	"The Hallowed Cage"	04:58:20	January 2, 2025	Guest stars Robbie Daymond.
119	"Predathos Awakened"	04:05:36	January 16, 2025	Guest stars Robbie Daymond.
120	"The Red End"	04:49:13	January 23, 2025	Guest stars Robbie Daymond.
121	"A New Age Begins"	08:37:09	February 6, 2025	This episode is split into two parts on Beacon and podcast networks. Guest stars Robbie Daymond, Erica Lindbeck, Aabria Iyengar, Christian Navarro, and Aimee Carrero.

== Reception ==
=== Accolades ===
Year	Award	Category	Result	Ref.
2025	Webby Awards	Podcasts (Features) – Best Partnership or Collaboration	Honoree	
