= Christian Navarro =

American actor

- Born: Christian Lee Navarro; August 21, 1991 (age 34); New York City, U.S.
- Occupation: Actor
- Years active: 2005–present

Christian Lee Navarro (born August 21, 1991) is an American actor known for playing Tony Padilla in the Netflix series 13 Reasons Why. He also had a recurring role in the HBO series Vinyl as he works on other movie projects such as Can You Ever Forgive Me? which was released in 2018.

== Early life ==
Navarro was born and raised in The Bronx borough of New York City and is of Puerto Rican descent.

== Career ==
Navarro's first film was Day of the Dead 2: Contagium (2005). In 2007, he appeared in one episode of Law and Order: Criminal Intent. He also had roles in various TV series, such as Blue Bloods, Taxi Brooklyn, and The Affair. He was also selected for the role of John White in the film Run It (2009).

In 2015, Navarro appeared in the pilot for the Rosewood TV series. In 2016, Navarro landed a recurring role in the TV series Vinyl. His big break came in 2017 when he landed the role of Tony Padilla in 13 Reasons Why. He also had roles in films such as Bushwick (2017) and Can You Ever Forgive Me? (2018). In 2018, the actor received the Rising Star Award at the San Diego International Film Festival. In 2021, he starred in the romantic comedy The List. Then in 2022, he appeared in the supernatural horror film Prey for the Devil.

In 2023, he appeared as a guest player in the third campaign of the actual play web series Critical Role. Then in 2024, he starred in the actual play podcast Godkiller: Oblivion as Plenus Eutoches. Rascal noted that the actual play "was nominated at a number of festivals on the Audio Fiction World Cup circuit" and won "Best Ensemble Cast at the LA Webfest". Navarro was also nominated for "Best Player Character Performance in an Actual Play (Podcast)" at the 2024 New Jersey WebFest.

== Filmography ==
=== Film ===
Year	Title	Role
2005	Day of the Dead 2: Contagium	The Infected
2009	Run It	John White
2017	Bushwick	Eduardo
2018	Can You Ever Forgive Me?	Kurt
2021	The List	Jake
2022	Prey for the Devil	Father Dante

=== Television ===
Year	Title	Role	Notes
2007	Law & Order: Criminal Intent	Paco Mendoza	Episode: "Senseless"
2013	Blue Bloods	Uniform #1	Episode: "To Protect and Serve"
2014	Taxi Brooklyn	Waiter Bobby	Episode: "Double Identity"
2014	The Affair	Jed	Episode: "108"
2015	Rosewood	Carlos Gomez	Episode: "Pilot"
2016	Vinyl	Jorge	4 episodes
2016	The Tick	Sidekick	Episode: "Pilot"
2017–2020	13 Reasons Why	Antonio "Tony" Padilla	Main role
2022	Law & Order: Special Victims Unit	Carlos Guzman	Episode: "Burning With Rage Forever"
2022	CSI: Vegas	Luther Canal	Episode: "In Harm's Way"
2025	Matlock	Diego Castillo	Episode: ”Call it a Christmas Gift”

=== Web ===
Year	Title		Role	Notes
2023	Critical Role	Campaign three	F.R.I.D.A.	Guest role; 8 episodes
2023	Critical Role	One-shots	Wrigley Rincon (Rigglemethis89)	Episode: "Generation Nord"
2024	Godkiller: Oblivion		Plenus Eutoches (voice)	Main role, producer; 11 episodes
2026	Dungeon Masters	Campaign 1: Ravenloft	Eloin Emberleaf, a Winter Walker Ranger	Main role

=== Video Games ===
Year	Title	Role	Ref.
2025	Date Everything!	Hector (voice)	
