= Krystina Arielle =

American actress

Krystina Arielle Tigner (born 1986) is an American actor and cosplayer. She is known for her work in several actual play web series and as the host of Star Wars: The High Republic Show.

== Life and career ==
Arielle moved to Los Angeles, California in 2015 from Columbus, Georgia. She married her husband Anthony Tigner in 2017. Her first actual play web series role was for Satine Phoenix's Sirens of the Realms streamed on Twitch. She has since acted on actual play series including Faster, Purple Worm! Kill! Kill!, Critical Role, The Ride of the Veiled Alliance, and Ten Candles.

== Filmography ==
- The Ironkeep Chronicles (Web Series) (2018-2019)
- The Candlenights 2020 Special (2020)
- Fungeons & Flagons (Web series) (2019)
- Into the Mother Lands RPG (Web series) (2020)
- Denver by Night (Web series) (2020)
- Library Bards: DnD (Short) (2020)
- Ex Roommate (Short) (2019)
- Star Trek Adventures - Forests of the Night (Web series) (2019)
- Adventuring Academy (Podcast) (2019)
- Critical Role (Web series) (2018)
- Stream of Many Eyes (2018) (TV short)
- Dimension 20: Pirates of Leviathan (Web series) (2020)
