= British Fantasy Award for Best Comic/Graphic Novel =

Former literary award for speculative fiction

- Awarded for: A comic book or graphic novel in the speculative fiction genre
- Country: United Kingdom
- Presented by: British Fantasy Society
- Formerly called: British Fantasy Award for Best Comic

Highlights
- Years awarded: 1973-1980; 2009-2022
- Website: britishfantasysociety.org

The British Fantasy Award for Best Comic/Graphic Novel was a literary award given annually as part of the British Fantasy Awards.

== History ==
The award was initially conferred in 1973 as "Best Comic". After 1980, the award was discontinued due to low number of nominations and votes, rendering the award no longer viable. The award was revived in 2009 as "Best Comic/Graphic Novel". The award was discontinued after 2022.

== Winners and shortlist ==
=== Best Comic: 1973-1980 ===
* Winners

Year	Author	Work	Publisher	Ref.
1973	Roy Thomas*	Conan the Barbarian	Marvel Comics	
1973	Barry Smith*	Conan the Barbarian	Marvel Comics	
1973	John Buscema*	Conan the Barbarian	Marvel Comics	
1974	Roy Thomas*	Conan the Barbarian	Marvel Comics	
1974	John Buscema*	Conan the Barbarian	Marvel Comics	
1974	Neal Adams*	Conan the Barbarian	Marvel Comics	
1975	Roy Thomas*	Savage Sword of Conan	Marvel Comics	
1975	John Buscema*	Savage Sword of Conan	Marvel Comics	
1976	Roy Thomas*	Savage Sword of Conan	Marvel Comics	
1976	John Buscema*	Savage Sword of Conan	Marvel Comics	
1976	Bernie Wrightson	Cool Air	Marvel Comics	
1976	Steve Gerber	Howard the Duck	Marvel Comics	
1976	Frank Brunner	Howard the Duck	Marvel Comics	
1977	Steve Gerber*	Howard the Duck #3: Four Feathers of Death	Marvel Comics	
1977	Steve Buscema*	Howard the Duck #3: Four Feathers of Death	Marvel Comics	
1977	Steve Leialoha*	Howard the Duck #3: Four Feathers of Death	Marvel Comics	
1977	Roy Thomas	People of the Black Circle: The Savage Sword of Conan #16	Marvel Comics	
1977	John Buscema	People of the Black Circle: The Savage Sword of Conan #16	Marvel Comics	
1977	Alfredo Alcala	People of the Black Circle: The Savage Sword of Conan #16	Marvel Comics	
1977	Frank Bellamy	The Spanish Lady - Garth	Daily Mirror	
1977	Jim Allard	The Spanish Lady - Garth	Daily Mirror	
1978	Doug Moench*	Weirdworld: Marvel Premiere #38	Marvel Comics	
1978	Steve Ploog*	Weirdworld: Marvel Premiere #38	Marvel Comics	
1978	Alex Niño*	Weirdworld: Marvel Premiere #38	Marvel Comics	
1978	Archie Goodwin	Avengers King Size Annual 7	Marvel Comics	
1978	Jim Starlin	Avengers King Size Annual 7	Marvel Comics	
1978	Chris Claremont	Starlord: Marvel Prieview # 11	Marvel Comics	
1978	John Byrne	Starlord: Marvel Prieview # 11	Marvel Comics	
1979	Roy Thomas*	The Scarlet Citadel: The Savage Sword of Conan #30	Marvel Comics	
1979	Frank Brunner*	The Scarlet Citadel: The Savage Sword of Conan #30	Marvel Comics	
1979	Mike Grell	All Men Are Mine: Warlord #14	Marvel Comics	
1979	Steve Gerber	Among the Great Divide: Rampaging Hulk #7	Marvel Comics	
1979	Jim Starlin	Among the Great Divide: Rampaging Hulk #7	Marvel Comics	
1979	Bob Wiacek	Among the Great Divide: Rampaging Hulk #7	Marvel Comics	
1979	Jim Stenstrum	Faster-Than-Light Interstellar Drive	1984	
1979	Louis Bremejo	Faster-Than-Light Interstellar Drive	1984	
1979	Chris Claremont	Sandsong	Marvel Preview	
1979	Carmine Infantino	Sandsong	Marvel Preview	
1980	Ted White*	Heavy Metal	Leonard Mogel	
1980	Wendy Pini	Elfquest	WaRP Graphics	
1980	Richard Pini	Elfquest	WaRP Graphics	
1980	Roy Thomas	Savage Sword of Conan	Marvel Comics	
1980	John Buscema	Savage Sword of Conan	Marvel Comics	

=== Best Comic/Graphic Novel ===
Year	Author	Work	Publisher	Ref.
2009	Joe Hill*	Locke & Key	IDW Publishing	
2009	Gabriel Rodriguez*	Locke & Key	IDW Publishing	
2009	Steve Niles	30 Days of Night: Beyond Barrow	IDW Publishing	
2009	Bill Sienkiewicz	30 Days of Night: Beyond Barrow	IDW Publishing	
2009	Grant Morrison	All-Star Superman	DC Comics	
2009	Frank Quitely	All-Star Superman	DC Comics	
2009	Joss Whedon	Buffy the Vampire Slayer Season Eight: Wolves at the Gate	Dark Horse Comics	
2009	Drew Goddard	Buffy the Vampire Slayer Season Eight: Wolves at the Gate	Dark Horse Comics	
2009	Georges Jeanty	Buffy the Vampire Slayer Season Eight: Wolves at the Gate	Dark Horse Comics	
2009	Rantz A. Hoseley	Comic Book Tattoo	Image Comics	
2009	Tori Amos	Comic Book Tattoo	Image Comics	
2009	Jamie Delano	Hellblazer: Fear Machine	Vertigo Comics	
2009	Andy Diggle	Hellblazer: The Laughing Magician	Vertigo Comics	
2009	Leonardo Manco	Hellblazer: The Laughing Magician	Vertigo Comics	
2009	Danijel Žeželj	Hellblazer: The Laughing Magician	Vertigo Comics	
2009	Selina Lock	The Girly Comic Book 1	Factor Fiction	
2009	Brian Michael Bendis	The New Avengers: Illuminati	Marvel Comics	
2009	Brian Reed	The New Avengers: Illuminati	Marvel Comics	
2009	Jim Cheung	The New Avengers: Illuminati	Marvel Comics	
2010	Neil Gaiman*	Whatever Happened to the Caped Crusader?	DC Comics	
2010	Andy Kubert*	Whatever Happened to the Caped Crusader?	DC Comics	
2010	Warren Ellis	FreakAngels	Avatar Press	
2010	Paul Duffield	FreakAngels	www.freakangels.com	
2010	Joe Hill	Locke & Key	IDW Publishing	
2010	Gabriel Rodriguez	Locke & Key	IDW Publishing	
2010	Selina Lock	The Girly Comic	Factor Fiction	
2010	Bill Willingham	Fables	Vertigo Comics	
2010	Mark Buckingham	Fables	Vertigo Comics	
2011	I. N. J. Culbard*	At the Mountains of Madness: a Graphic Novel	SelfMadeHero	
2011	Mark Millar	CLiNT	Titan Publishing Group	
2011	Bryan Talbot	Grandville: Mon Amour	Jonathan Cape	
2011	Alan Moore	Neonomicon	Avatar Press	
2011	Jacen Burrows	Neonomicon	Avatar Press	
2011	Mike Carey	The Unwritten, Vols. 1 and 2	Titan Publishing Group	
2011	Peter Gross	The Unwritten, Vols. 1 and 2	Titan Publishing Group	
2012	Joe Hill*	Locke & Key	IDW Publishing	
2012	Gabriel Rodriguez*	Locke & Key	IDW Publishing	
2012	Jeff Lemire	Animal Man	DC Comics	
2012	Travel Foreman	Animal Man	DC Comics	
2012	J. H. Williams III	Batwoman	DC Comics	
2012	W. Haden Blackman	Batwoman	DC Comics	
2012	Mike Carey	The Unwritten	Vertigo Comics	
2012	Peter Gross	The Unwritten	Vertigo Comics	
2012	Robert Kirkman	The Walking Dead	Image Comics	
2012	Charlie Adlard	The Walking Dead	Image Comics	
2013	Brian K. Vaughan*	Saga	Image Comics	
2013	Fiona Staples*	Saga	Image Comics	
2013	Mike Carey, et al.	The Unwritten	Titan Publishing Group	
2013	Robert Kirkman	The Walking Dead	Skybound Entertainment / Image Comics	
2013	Charlie Adlard	The Walking Dead	Skybound Entertainment / Image Comics	
2013	China Miéville	Dial H	DC Comics	
2013	Mateus Santolouco	Dial H	DC Comics	
2013	David Lapham	Dial H	DC Comics	
2013	Riccardo Burchielli	Dial H	DC Comics	
2014	Becky Cloonan*	Demeter	Self-published	
2014	Mike Carey	The Unwritten	Titan Publishing Group	
2014	Peter Gross	The Unwritten	Titan Publishing Group	
2014	Terry Moore	Rachel Rising	Abstract Studio	
2014	Benjamin Read	Porcelain	Improper Books	
2014	Chris Wildgoose	Porcelain	Improper Books	
2014	Brian K. Vaughan	Saga	Image Comics	
2014	Fiona Staples	Saga	Image Comics	
2014	Maura McHugh	Jennifer Wilde	Atomic Diner Comics	
2014	Karen Mahoney	Jennifer Wilde	Atomic Diner Comics	
2014	Stephen Downey	Jennifer Wilde	Atomic Diner Comics	
2015	Emily Carroll*	Through the Woods	Margaret K. McElderry Books	
2015	Kieron Gillen	The Wicked + The Divine	Image Comics	
2015	Jamie McKelvie	The Wicked + The Divine	Image Comics	
2015	Charlaine Harris	Cemetery Girl	Jo Fletcher	
2015	Christopher Golden	Cemetery Girl	Jo Fletcher	
2015	Don Kramer	Cemetery Girl	Jo Fletcher	
2015	Bryan Lee O'Malley	Seconds	SelfMadeHero	
2015	Bryan Talbot	Grandville: Noël	Jonathan Cape	
2015	Brian K. Vaughan	Saga	Image Comics	
2015	Fiona Staples	Saga	Image Comics	
2016	Kelly Sue DeConnick*	Bitch Planet #2-5	Image Comics	
2016	Valentine De Landro*	Bitch Planet #2-5	Image Comics	
2016	Robert Wilson IV*	Bitch Planet #2-5	Image Comics	
2016	Cris Peter	Bitch Planet #2-5	Image Comics	
2016	Gail Simone	Red Sonja, #14-18	Dynamite Entertainment	
2016	Walter Geovani	Red Sonja, #14-18	Dynamite Entertainment	
2016	ND Stevenson	Nimona	HarperTeen	
2016	Brian K. Vaughan	Saga, #25-32	Image Comics	
2016	Fiona Staples	Saga, #25-32	Image Comics	
2016	G. Willow Wilson	Ms. Marvel, Vol 2: Generation Why	Marvel Comics	
2016	Jacob Wyatt	Ms. Marvel, Vol 2: Generation Why	Marvel Comics	
2016	Adrian Alphona	Ms. Marvel, Vol 2: Generation Why	Marvel Comics	
2017	Marjorie Liu*	Monstress, Vol 1: Awakening, Marjorie Liu & Sana Takeda	Image Comics	
2017	Sana Takeda*	Monstress, Vol 1: Awakening, Marjorie Liu & Sana Takeda	Image Comics	
2017	Matt Smith	2000 AD	2000 AD Graphic Novels	
2017	Kate Leth	Patsy Walker, A.K.A. Hellcat!, #2-15	Marvel Comics	
2017	Brittney Williams	Patsy Walker, A.K.A. Hellcat!, #2-15	Marvel Comics	
2017	Brian K. Vaughan	Saga, #33-40	Image Comics	
2017	Fiona Staples	Saga, #33-40	Image Comics	
2017	Garth Ennis	Sixpack and Dogwelder: Hard Travelin’ Heroz, #1-5	DC Comics	
2017	Russ Braun	Sixpack and Dogwelder: Hard Travelin’ Heroz, #1-5	DC Comics	
2017	Jennie Gyllblad	Skal	—	
2018	Marjorie Liu*	Monstress, Vol 2: The Blood	Image Comics	
2018	Sana Takeda*	Monstress, Vol 2: The Blood	Image Comics	
2018	Kelly Sue DeConnick	Bitch Planet Vol 2: President Bitch	Image Comics	
2018	Taki Soma	Bitch Planet Vol 2: President Bitch	Image Comics	
2018	Valentine De Landro	Bitch Planet Vol 2: President Bitch	Image Comics	
2018	Joshua Cornah	Grim & Bold	Kristell Ink	
2018	Jack Lothian	Tomorrow	BHP Comics	
2018	Garry Mac	Tomorrow	BHP Comics	
2018	Kieron Gillen	The Wicked + The Divine Vol 5: Imperial Phase Part 1	Image Comics	
2018	Jamie McKelvie	The Wicked + The Divine Vol 5: Imperial Phase Part 1	Image Comics	
2019	Kate Ashwin*	Widdershins, Vol. 7: Curtain Call	Self-published	
2019	Lucy Bellwood	100 Demon Dialogues	Toonhound	
2019	Mike Mignola et al.	B.P.R.D. Hell on Earth, Vol. 1	Dark Horse Comics	
2019	Mike Mignola et al.	Hellboy: The Complete Short Stories, Vol. 1	Dark Horse Comics	
2019	Robert S. Malan	The Prisoner	Luna	
2019	John Cockshaw	The Prisoner	Luna	
2019	Brian K. Vaughan	Saga, #49-54	Image Comics	
2019	Fiona Staples	Saga, #49-54	Image Comics	
2020	Kieron Gillen*	DIE	Image Comics	
2020	Stephanie Hans*	DIE	Image Comics	
2020	Matt Smith	2000 AD	Rebellion	
2020	Joe Hill	Basketful of Heads #1	DC Comics	
2020	Mike Mignola et al.	B.P.R.D. The Devil You Know, Vol. 3: Ragna Rok	Dark Horse Comics	
2020	Tom Taylor et al.	DCeased #1-6	DC Comics	
2020	Pentti Otsamo	The Ozone Diary	Luna	
2020	Tero Mielonen	The Ozone Diary	Luna	
2021	Kieron Gillen*	DIE Vol. 2: Split the Party	Image Comics	
2021	Stephanie Hans*	DIE Vol. 2: Split the Party	Image Comics	
2021	Jo Rioux	The Daughters of Ys	First Second Books	
2021	M. T. Anderson	The Daughters of Ys	First Second Books	
2021	Simon Spurrier	John Constantine: Hellblazer, Vol. 1: Marks of Woe	DC Comics	
2021	Aaron Campbell	John Constantine: Hellblazer, Vol. 1: Marks of Woe	DC Comics	
2021	Trung Le Nguyen	The Magic Fish	Random House Graphic	
2021	Ben Aaronovitch	Rivers of London: The Fey and the Furious	Titan Publishing Group	
2021	Andrew Cartmel	Rivers of London: The Fey and the Furious	Titan Publishing Group	
2021	Junji Ito	Venus in the Blind Spot	Viz	
2022	Lee Knox Ostertag*	The Girl from the Sea	Graphix	
2022	—	2000AD	—	
2022	Kieron Gillen	DIE Vol. 4	Image Comics	
2022	Stephanie Hans	DIE Vol. 4	Image Comics	
2022	Juni Ba	Djeliya	TKO Studios	
2022	V. E. Schwab	ExtraOrdinary	Titan Publishing Group	
2022	Enid Balam	ExtraOrdinary	Titan Publishing Group	
2022	Stan Sakai	Usagi Yojimbo: Homecoming	IDW Publishing	
