= List of fictional gay characters =

Listicle of fictional homosexual characters

This is a list of gay characters in fiction, i.e. characters that either self-identify as gay or have been identified by outside parties to be gay, becoming part of gay media. Listed characters are either recurring characters, cameos, guest stars, or one-off characters, some of which may be gay icons. This page does not include gay characters in animation, feature films or television.

For fictional characters in other parts of the LGBTQ community, see the lists of trans, bisexual, lesbian, non-binary, pansexual, aromantic, asexual, and intersex characters.

The names are organized alphabetically by surname (i.e. last name), or by single name if the character does not have a surname. If more than two characters are in one entry, the last name of the first character is used.

== Graphic novels ==
| Characters | Title | Years | Notes | Country |
|---|---|---|---|---|
| Corinthian | The Sandman | 1989–2015 | The Corinthian is a nightmare created by Dream. He has two additional mouths in place of his eyes, which he covers with sunglasses. In The Doll's House, he goes AWOL from the dreamscape and becomes a serial killer who invites men to have sexual relations with him, then murders them. Corinthian then removes the eyes of their victims and eats them using his eye-mouths. Neil Gaiman has stated that the Corinthian is homosexual in The Sandman Companion, wherein the first Corinthian consumed eyes only of boys. The second Corinthian is featured with a boyfriend as written by Caitlin R. Kiernan in the Dreaming. | England |
| Dads of Charlotte "Charlie" | The Witch Boy | 2017 | They are the dads of Charlie, a tomboy. They appear in all three graphic novels as recurring characters (Note: One or both of Charlie's Dads are also featured on pages 32, 33, and 34 of The Hidden Witch as Aster has dinner with them, and later on pages 92, 125, 127, 129, and 137. Also, they appear either individually, or together, on pages 18, 19, 20, 21, 39, 58, and 59 of The Midwinter Witch.) and are the only explicitly LGBTQ characters shown in the graphic novels. | United States |
| Dads of Charlotte "Charlie" | The Hidden Witch | 2018 | They are the dads of Charlie, a tomboy. They appear in all three graphic novels as recurring characters and are the only explicitly LGBTQ characters shown in the graphic novels. | United States |
| Dads of Charlotte "Charlie" | The Midwinter Witch | 2019 | They are the dads of Charlie, a tomboy. They appear in all three graphic novels as recurring characters and are the only explicitly LGBTQ characters shown in the graphic novels. | United States |
| Iceman | All-New X-Men | 2002–present | All New X-Men #40 (2015) contains a pivotal moment where Iceman/Bobby Drake (as a younger version of himself) is informed by Jean Grey that his thoughts reveal his homosexuality. The scene plays out with Bobby wondering why his older self (the one in present-day X-Men comics) dated women for so long; he ponders bi-sexuality before being told, unequivocally, that he is in fact gay. | United States |
| Jayesh "Jay" | Lucifer | 2000–2006 | Jay is a friend of Jill Presto. Jay is interested in a man named Karl, unaware that Karl is a homophobic neo-Nazi. Jay asks Karl out, after being encouraged by Jill. Afterwards, Karl and other men and beat Jay up in a dark alley. | United Kingdom |
| Kevin Keller | Veronica | 1989–2011 | First appearance: Veronica #202 (2010). Kevin was first eyed by Veronica who did not realize he was gay. He has since become a part of the gang. | United States |
| Kid Juggernaut | Marvel Comics | 2024-present | Justin Jin is a friendly and confident Korean-Canadian superhero with superhuman strength. He is a successor to the supervillain Juggernaut. He is also openly gay. | United States |
| Andy Lippincott | Doonsbury | 1970–present | First appearance: 1976. Andy Lippincott was the first openly gay character to appear in a mainstream comic strip. | United States |
| Midnighter | Midnighter & Midnighter | 2006–2008 & 2015–2016 | Midnighter is one of DC Comics' most prominent gay superheroes and his relationship with Apollo is one of the most prominent gay relationships in DC Comics. | United States |
| Apollo | Midnighter & Midnighter | 2006–2008 & 2015–2016 | Midnighter is one of DC Comics' most prominent gay superheroes and his relationship with Apollo is one of the most prominent gay relationships in DC Comics. | United States |
| Northstar | Uncanny X-Men | 1963–2015 | First appearance: Uncanny X-Men #120 (1979). Northstar was the first openly gay superhero in the Marvel Comics universe. | |
| Lawrence Poirier | For Better or For Worse | 1979–2008 | In 1993, Lawrence Poirier's coming out generated controversy, with readers opposed to homosexuality threatening to cancel newspaper subscriptions. See also: For Better or For Worse#Lawrence comes out. | Canada |
| Arnie Roth | Marvel comics | 1982-present | The oldest friend and mentor of Steve Rogers. | United States |
| Thomas Werner | Thomas no Shinzō | 1974–1975 | Set in a German boys boarding school, the story relates how, after Thomas' suicide, an upper classman, Yuri, finds a love letter Thomas wrote to him, and then meets a new student, Eric, who looks just like Thomas. | Japan |
| Julusmole Bayhan ("Juli" or "Yuli") | Thomas no Shinzō | 1974–1975 | Set in a German boys boarding school, the story relates how, after Thomas' suicide, an upper classman, Yuri, finds a love letter Thomas wrote to him, and then meets a new student, Eric, who looks just like Thomas. | Japan |
| Eric Fruehling | Thomas no Shinzō | 1974–1975 | Set in a German boys boarding school, the story relates how, after Thomas' suicide, an upper classman, Yuri, finds a love letter Thomas wrote to him, and then meets a new student, Eric, who looks just like Thomas. | Japan |
| Andrew Wells | Buffy the Vampire Slayer comics | 1998–present | Andrew realizes he is gay in Buffy the Vampire Slayer Season Ten. | United States |
| Wiccan | Marvel Comics | 1986-present | Wiccan is a superhero and the son of Scarlet Witch. He falls in love with and marries Hulkling. | United States |

== Literature ==
| Characters | Work | Author | Year | Description |
|---|---|---|---|---|
| Achilles | The Song of Achilles | Madeline Miller | 2011 | Achilles is gay, showing no interest in girls, while Patroclus is bisexual, saying he would fall in love with Briseis if not for Achilles. |
| Assorted characters | Tales of the City series | Armistead Maupin | 1978–2014 | While the original series featured gay and bisexual characters who "kissed on camera and had sex in bathhouses," in the Netflix adaption of this series, Shawna is "explicitly bisexual character." |
| Brysen | Black Wings Beating | Alex London | 2018 | Brysen is a teenager on a quest to hunt down a giant, monstrous black eagle. Throughout the book, he shows exclusive romantic interest in men. |
| David | Giovanni's Room | James Baldwin | 1956 | David, a protagonist of the book, escapes death from the guillotine since his "homosexual urges were experimental in nature" while the narrator is cited as a gay character as well. Other gay characters include Giovanni, Jacques, and Guillaume. |
| Dino | The Past and Other Things That Should Stay Buried | Shaun David Hutchinson | 2019 | Dino is a curmudgeonly and bookish Puerto Rican teenager who discovers that his estranged best friend July has risen from the grave. Dino also has a boyfriend. |
| Wylan Van Eck | Six of Crows duology | Leigh Bardugo | 2015–2016 | Jesper is bisexual, and Wylan is gay; they begin dating each other by the end of the duology, while Nina has also been confirmed to be pansexual. |
| Alucard Emery | Shades of Magic trilogy | V.E. Schwab | 2015–17 | Rhy is bisexual while Alucard is gay. They had a fling three years prior the events of the books. Victoria Schwab actually stated multiple times that in her eyes none of the characters are straight, but that is not mentioned in the series. |
| Jack Forster | What Happened to Mr. Forster? | Gary W. Bargar | 1989 | A sixth-grade teacher who is fired for being gay. |
| Jack Forster | What Happened to Mr. Forster? | Gary W. Bargar | 1995 | A sixth-grade teacher who is fired for being gay. |
| Dorian Gray | The Picture of Dorian Gray | Oscar Wilde | 1890 | Dorian is ambivalent about his homosexuality, meeting with male prostitutes, and proposes to a woman in an effort to suppress his homosexuality. |
| Basil Hallward | The Picture of Dorian Gray | Oscar Wilde | 1890 | In this novel, Basil has a "repressed homosexuality" while Dorian has his own ambivalence, meeting with male prostitutes, even proposing to Sybil Vane in an attempt to suppress his homosexual feelings. |
| Basil Henderson | Invisible Life | E. Lynn Harris | 1991 | Basil leaves his fiancée Yancey at the altar and pursues a gay lifestyle. |
| Basil Henderson | Just As I Am | E. Lynn Harris | 1995 | Basil leaves his fiancée Yancey at the altar and pursues a gay lifestyle. |
| Basil Henderson | Abide With Me | E. Lynn Harris | 1999 | Basil leaves his fiancée Yancey at the altar and pursues a gay lifestyle. |
| Basil Henderson | Any Way the Wind Blows | E. Lynn Harris | 2001 | Basil leaves his fiancée Yancey at the altar and pursues a gay lifestyle. |
| Joel Harrison Knox | Other Voices, Other Rooms | Truman Capote | 1948 | Joel is an "effeminate adolescent," with the narrative showing him have a desire for his cousin, Randolph. |
| Oshima | Kafka on the Shore | Haruki Murakami | 2002 | Oshima is a 21-year-old intellectual gay trans man who is a librarian and owner of a cabin in the mountains near Komura Memorial Library. He becomes the mentor of Kafka as he guides him to the answers that he's seeking on his journey. |
| Rafi | The Past and Other Things That Should Stay Buried | Shaun David Hutchinson | 2019 | Rafi is a kind-hearted and handsome but deeply insecure Pakistani-American teenager. He is also transgender and has a boyfriend. |
| Randolph | Other Voices, Other Rooms | Truman Capote | 1948 | Randolph is a cousin of Joel, and a person that Joel has romantic feelings for. |
| Richard | The Hours | Michael Cunningham | 1998 | In this novel, which has strong parallels with Virginia Woolf's Mrs Dalloway, Clarissa rejects a relationship with Richard, a gay man, for the love of her life, Sally, who is invigorated by this love. Louis is also Richard's former lover, with Richard later taking his own life, while Clarissa comes to a full realization of her own identity. |
| Louis | The Hours | Michael Cunningham | 1998 | In this novel, which has strong parallels with Virginia Woolf's Mrs Dalloway, Clarissa rejects a relationship with Richard, a gay man, for the love of her life, Sally, who is invigorated by this love. Louis is also Richard's former lover, with Richard later taking his own life, while Clarissa comes to a full realization of her own identity. |
| Jack Twist | "Brokeback Mountain" (short story) | Annie Proulx | 1997 | Jack and Ennis have a long term sexual and romantic relationship despite both being married to women and fathering children. Jack also has sexual relationships with other men and a woman, while Ennis does not. Critics have described both men as gay or variably Jack as bisexual and Ennis as heterosexual. |
| Ennis del Mar | "Brokeback Mountain" (short story) | Annie Proulx | 1997 | Jack and Ennis have a long term sexual and romantic relationship despite both being married to women and fathering children. Jack also has sexual relationships with other men and a woman, while Ennis does not. Critics have described both men as gay or variably Jack as bisexual and Ennis as heterosexual. |
| Vanyel | Arrows of the Queen | Mercedes Lackey | 1987 | Lackey, in making this book, took a stand, refusing the demand of an editor that Vanyel be "straight, or single, or not in the story," and, as such, he is a gay character. |

== Video games ==
| Characters | Series / Title | Year | Notes | Developer |
|---|---|---|---|---|
| Barnaby | Billie Bust Up | Upcoming | The upcoming musical platformer Billie Bust Up features a kooky, ghostly owl named Barnaby. In an official Twitter post for pride month, Barnaby is illustrated with flags that reveal he is gay and on the asexual spectrum. | Giddy Goat Games |
| Damien Bloodmarch | Dream Daddy: A Dad Dating Simulator | 2017 | In this visual novel and dating sim, Damien Bloodmarch is a gay trans man. | Game Grumps |
| Bubbles | Angry Birds 2 | 2015 | Bubbles is an optimistic young spot-breasted oriole who loves Halloween. Although incredibly small in stature, he has the ability to drastically increase in body size, similar to the defense mechanism of a pufferfish. In the pride-themed "Better Together" microtransaction, the player can buy him an outfit that includes a gay male pride flag balloon. | Rovio Entertainment |
| Gay cop | The Longest Journey | 1999 | This computer game features Fiona and Mickey, a lesbian landlady and her long-time lover. The game also features and a gay cop, with gay characters seen as normal and well adjusted secondary characters. | Funcom |
| Eladus | Guild Wars 2 | 2012 | This MMORPG game includes the sylvari race of plant-like humanoids who don't reproduce sexually. As such, they do not base their relationships upon reproduction, but rather love, sensuality, and finding beauty in one another. Eladus and Dagdar are two young male sylvari in a gay relationship. The player is able to encounter and save Eladus and Dagdar from the Knight Bercilak the Green in an optional quest. | ArenaNet |
| Dagdar | Guild Wars 2 | 2012 | This MMORPG game includes the sylvari race of plant-like humanoids who don't reproduce sexually. As such, they do not base their relationships upon reproduction, but rather love, sensuality, and finding beauty in one another. Eladus and Dagdar are two young male sylvari in a gay relationship. The player is able to encounter and save Eladus and Dagdar from the Knight Bercilak the Green in an optional quest. | ArenaNet |
| Saied | Circuit's Edge | 1989 | This DOS Interactive fiction and role-playing game includes a variety of gay and transgender characters, including a trans woman named Yasmin with a gay man named Saied alleged to be Yasmin's former lover. | Westwood Studios |
| Variety of characters | Circuit's Edge | 1989 | This DOS Interactive fiction and role-playing game includes a variety of gay and transgender characters, including a trans woman named Yasmin with a gay man named Saied alleged to be Yasmin's former lover. | Westwood Studios |
| Percy | Billie Bust Up | Upcoming | The upcoming musical platformer Billie Bust Up features a friendly shopkeeper cat named Percy. In an official Twitter post for pride month, he's illustrated waving a gay male pride flag. | Giddy Goat Games |
| Trevor | Phantasmagoria 2: A Puzzle of Flesh | 1996 | In this interactive movie, point-and-click adventure, Curtis is the protagonist, who is a close friend with his gay co-worker, Trevor. The two almost kiss later in the game. | Sierra On-Line |

== Webcomics ==
| Characters | Name of comic | Years | Notes |
|---|---|---|---|
| Eric Bittle | Check, Please! | 2013–present | This comic by Ngozi Ukazu centers around a gay protagonist on a college hockey team. |
| Jo's dads | Lumberjanes | 2014–2020 | Jo is a trans woman of color with two dads and acts as an "expert on what it means to be a Lumberjane" to the fellow campers. |
| Multiple characters | Unsounded | 2010–Present | This webcomic by Ashley Cope features multiple gay characters. |
| Jeff Olsen | Kyle's Bed & Breakfast | 1998–present | This comic by Greg Fox covers controversial LGBT topics such as marriage equality, HIV/AIDS, body fascism and conversion therapy. This story features various LGBT characters, such as Jeff Olsen, a gay man with HIV, Mark Masterson, a gay scholar, and Kristian Janson, a Jamaican gay man. |
| Mark Masterson | Kyle's Bed & Breakfast | 1998–present | This comic by Greg Fox covers controversial LGBT topics such as marriage equality, HIV/AIDS, body fascism and conversion therapy. This story features various LGBT characters, such as Jeff Olsen, a gay man with HIV, Mark Masterson, a gay scholar, and Kristian Janson, a Jamaican gay man. |
| Kristian Janson | Kyle's Bed & Breakfast | 1998–present | This comic by Greg Fox covers controversial LGBT topics such as marriage equality, HIV/AIDS, body fascism and conversion therapy. This story features various LGBT characters, such as Jeff Olsen, a gay man with HIV, Mark Masterson, a gay scholar, and Kristian Janson, a Jamaican gay man. |
| Other characters | Kyle's Bed & Breakfast | 1998–present | This comic by Greg Fox covers controversial LGBT topics such as marriage equality, HIV/AIDS, body fascism and conversion therapy. This story features various LGBT characters, such as Jeff Olsen, a gay man with HIV, Mark Masterson, a gay scholar, and Kristian Janson, a Jamaican gay man. |
| Dirk Strider | Homestuck | 2009-2016 | In this webcomic by Andrew Hussie, Dirk Strider states he is only attracted to men. He also dates Jake English, a bisexual man, for a couple months. |
| Rudy Strongwell | Rain | 2010–2022 | This comic by Jocelyn Samara and DiDomenick features a trans girl, Rain, as the main character and other LGBT characters, like a gay man named Rudy Strongwell, and a gay couple (Trevor Kurz and Frank Johnson). |
| Trevor Kurz | Rain | 2010–2022 | This comic by Jocelyn Samara and DiDomenick features a trans girl, Rain, as the main character and other LGBT characters, like a gay man named Rudy Strongwell, and a gay couple (Trevor Kurz and Frank Johnson). |
| Frank Johnson | Rain | 2010–2022 | This comic by Jocelyn Samara and DiDomenick features a trans girl, Rain, as the main character and other LGBT characters, like a gay man named Rudy Strongwell, and a gay couple (Trevor Kurz and Frank Johnson). |

== See also ==
- Gay pulp fiction
- Gay literature
- Gay village
- Gay bashing
- List of films with LGBT characters
- List of made-for-television films with LGBT characters
- List of lesbian, gay, bisexual or transgender-related films
- LGBTQ themes in comics
- List of animated series with LGBTQ characters
- List of polyamorous characters in fiction
- List of LGBT-themed speculative fiction
- List of LGBT characters in soap operas
- List of LGBT-related films
- Lists of LGBT figures in fiction and myth
