= We Are the Ants =

2016 novel by Shaun David Hutchinson

- Cover of We Are the Ants
- Author: Shaun David Hutchinson
- Language: English
- Genre: Young adult fiction, Science fiction
- Publisher: Simon Pulse
- Publication date: January 19, 2016
- Followed by: "What We Pretend to Be"

We Are the Ants is a young adult science fiction novel by Shaun David Hutchinson, published January 19, 2016 by Simon Pulse with a 24-page companion story, "What We Pretend to Be", published on the publisher's website, Riveted, later that year.

The book follows Henry, whose boyfriend recently committed suicide. Henry is abducted by aliens and has 144 days to decide whether or not to push a button that will save the Earth from alien destruction. However, he's not sure Earth is worth saving until he meets Diego, an artist with a troubled past.

== Reception ==
The book was generally well-received by critics, including starred reviews from Booklist, Kirkus Reviews, School Library Journal, Publishers Weekly, and Shelf Awareness. Kirkus called the book "[b]itterly funny, with a ray of hope amid bleakness." Shelf Awareness echoed the sentiment, calling the novel "bracingly smart and unusual." As if explaining the book's unusualness, School Library Journal compared the storyline and writing style to Nick Burd’s The Vast Fields of Ordinary and Kurt Vonnegut’s Slaughterhouse Five. Booklist further explained, "Hutchinson’s excellent novel of ideas invites readers to wonder about their place in a world that often seems uncaring and meaningless. The novel is never didactic; on the contrary, it is unfailingly dramatic and crackling with characters who become real upon the page."

The Lambda Literary Foundation and Voice of Youth Advocates (VOYA) also praised the book for its thematic contents. VOYA said the novel tells "a very complex story about serious subjects." Lambda Literary expanded on the idea, saying it "is a book about more than love and loss; it’s about struggling to find motivation and not taking the people in your life for granted." Both complimented Hutchinson's writing. Lambda Literary called the book "a beautiful, masterfully told story by someone who is at the top of his craft," and VOYA noted, "The voices of each character are strong and unique."

The Horn Book Magazine provided a mixed review that complimented the character development but called the plot "lagging" and "issue-laden."

=== Awards and honors ===
We Are the Ants has been named on multiple "best of" lists, including Time's continuously updated "100 Best YA Books of All Time," as well as School Library Journal's and Shelf Awareness's lists of the best books of the year.

The book is also a Junior Library Guild selection.

Awards for We Are the Ants
Year	Award	Result	Ref.
2016	Goodreads Choice Award for Young Adult Fantasy & Science Fiction	Nominee	
2016	Kirkus Prize	Nominee	
2017	ALA Best Fiction for Young Adults	Selection	
2017	ALA Rainbow Book List	Top 10	

=== Controversy ===
On November 4, 2021, the Keller Independent School District in Keller, Texas unanimously decided to the book would only be available in the high school.

In 2022, We Are the Ants was listed among 52 books banned by the Alpine School District following the implementation of Utah law H.B. 374, "Sensitive Materials In Schools." Forty-two percent of removed books "feature LBGTQ+ characters and or themes." Many of the books were removed because they were considered to contain pornographic material according to the new law, which defines porn using the following criteria:

- "The average person" would find that the material, on the whole, "appeals to prurient interest in sex"
- The material "is patently offensive in the description or depiction of nudity, sexual conduct, sexual excitement, sadomasochistic abuse, or excretion"
- The material, on the whole, "does not have serious literary, artistic, political or scientific value."
