= Dungeons & Dragons in popular culture =

Aspect of culture

Dungeons & Dragons (D&D) is a fantasy role-playing game first published in 1974. As the popularity of the game grew throughout the late-1970s and 1980s, it became referenced in popular culture more frequently. The complement of games, films and cultural references based on Dungeons & Dragons or similar fantasies, characters, and adventures became ubiquitous after the end of the 1970s.

Dungeons & Dragons, and tabletop role-playing games in general, have exerted a deep and persistent impact on the development of all types of video games, from "first-person shooters to real-time strategy games and massively multiplayer online games", which in turn play a significant and ongoing role in modern popular culture.

In online culture, the term dungeon has since come to mean a virtual location where people can meet and collaborate. Hence, multi-user dungeons emerged throughout the 1970s and 1980s as a form of social networks or a social virtual reality. By creating a means for players to assemble and explore an imaginary world, the Dungeons & Dragons rules provided a transition from fantasy literary settings, such as those of author J. R. R. Tolkien, to fully virtual worlds.

Public figures who play or have played Dungeons & Dragons include comedians Stephen Colbert and Chris Hardwick, musician Moby, and actors Vin Diesel, Matthew Lillard, Joe Manganiello, Mike Myers, Patton Oswalt, Wil Wheaton, and Robin Williams.

== Literature ==
=== Books ===
Independent fiction derived from the Dungeons & Dragons game appeared with the Endless Quest series of books, published by TSR, Inc between 1982 and 1987. The Endless Quest books provided a form of interactive fiction in the style of the Choose Your Own Adventure series. The continuing success of Dungeons & Dragons then sparked an even more extensive series of novels, also published by TSR, Inc. The first of these were based upon the Dragonlance campaign setting, and were released in 1984. There proved to be a lucrative market for these works, and by the 2000s a significant portion of all fantasy paperbacks were being published by Wizards of the Coast, the American game company that acquired TSR, Inc in 1997.

The impact of Dungeons & Dragons on players and culture has inspired reflective non-fiction works:

- The Elfish Gene: Dungeons, Dragons and Growing Up Strange (2007), by novelist Mark Barrowcliffe; a memoir of playing Dungeons & Dragons and other role playing games in the 1970s.
- American Nerd: The Story of My People (2008) is Time magazine writer Benjamin Nugent's study of the history and culture of people labeled nerds. It includes insights into why people play and enjoy Dungeons & Dragons.
- Fantasy Freaks and Gaming Geeks: An Epic Quest for Reality Among Role Players, Online Gamers, and Other Dwellers of Imaginary Realms (2010), by journalist and gamer Ethan Gilsdorf; a travel memoir about Dungeons & Dragons, role-playing games, and other fantasy and gaming subcultures.
- Designers & Dragons (2011), by historian Shannon Appelcline, is a book series about the history of the tabletop role-playing games. The first edition was published in 2011 by Mongoose Publishing. Appelcline later wrote an expanded four-volume version, Designers & Dragons: A History of the Roleplaying Game Industry. It was published in 2014 by Evil Hat Productions, with one volume dedicated to each decade from the 1970s to the 2000s. The first edition won a Judges' Spotlight award at the 2012 ENnie Awards; the second edition won the Gold Ennie for Best RPG Related Product in 2015 and was a finalist for the Diana Jones Award. Appelcline's next Evil Hat Productions series, titled Designers & Dragons: Origins, will be "a product-by-product chronicle of every item released by TSR for Original D&D, Basic D&D, and Advanced D&D 1st edition". In 2025, this series was funded through a crowdfunding campaign.
- Author Shelly Mazzanoble wrote a humorous self-help guide called Everything I Need to Know I Learned from Dungeons & Dragons: One Woman's Quest to Trade Self-help for Elf-help (2011). This followed her guide book, Confessions of a Part-time Sorceress: A Girl's Guide to the Dungeons & Dragons Game (2007).
- Of Dice and Men: The Story of Dungeons & Dragons and the People Who Play It (2013), by journalist David M. Ewalt; a best-selling history of the game's development and cultural impact.

Several characters created for playing Dungeons & Dragons, or games derived from Dungeons & Dragons, have later spawned popular fantasy series.

=== Comics ===
Begun in 1986, the comic books The Adventurers and Redfox were inspired by Dungeons & Dragons. Several commercial comic strips are based entirely upon the game or make reference to the game in specific panels.

- Knights of the Dinner Table is a comic-sized magazine featuring comic strips with a variety of characters who play "HackMaster," a parody of Dungeons & Dragons. (HackMaster would later go on to become an actual role-playing game.) Early strips appeared in the official Dungeons & Dragons magazine Dragon.
- The Order of the Stick is a satirical webcomic that features a cast of characters in a world that loosely operates by the rules of Dungeons & Dragons.
- Penny Arcade, a longstanding webcomic, created by Jerry Holkins and Mike Krahulik, references and even depicts humorous instances of bizarre campaigns, and other Dungeons & Dragons subject matter; implementing dice-rolling humor and other game dynamics.

=== Plays ===
Dungeons & Dragons has been used as a central motif in plays, including:

- She Kills Monsters (2011) by Qui Nguyen
- Initiative (2025) by Else Went

== Film and television ==
=== Film ===
There have been multiple feature films released that were based upon the game: Dungeons & Dragons (2000), Dungeons & Dragons: Wrath of the Dragon God (2005), and Dungeons & Dragons: The Book of Vile Darkness (2012). A new film based on the game, Dungeons & Dragons: Honor Among Thieves, was released in March 2023; it was directed by Jonathan Goldstein and John Francis Daley.

Several films include instances of characters playing the game of Dungeons & Dragons or make other references to the game:

- In scene 2 of Steven Spielberg's E.T. the Extra-Terrestrial, the character Elliott, his older brother, and his friends are shown playing Dungeons & Dragons. Prior to the production of the film, Spielberg ran a Dungeons & Dragons session with the young cast members.
- The Futurama film Bender's Game includes Dungeons & Dragons as a crucial plot device, in which the main characters end up in a fantasy realm after the game is played. The film was already in production upon Gygax's death and debuted later that year, so it was dedicated in his honor. The film included parodies of Dungeons & Dragons-influenced films.
- The films The Gamers and The Gamers: Dorkness Rising by the Dead Gentlemen are parodies of Dungeons & Dragons.
- The 2020 animated film Onward by Pixar used Dungeons & Dragons monsters, particularly the Gelatinous Cube and the Beholder.

=== Television ===
The CBS network ran a Saturday morning cartoon series called Dungeons & Dragons, in which a group of teenagers visiting a Dungeons and Dragons-themed theme park dark ride are magically transported into the fantasy world of Dungeons and Dragons. The show included the voice talents of Willie Aames of Eight is Enough, and ran from 1983 to 1985.

Dungeons & Dragons is also referenced in a variety of television programs:

- The Big Bang Theory – In the episode "The D&D Vortex", Wil Wheaton invites Leonard to play a game with him and a group of celebrity players, including William Shatner, Kevin Smith, Joe Manganiello, and Kareem Abdul-Jabbar. Will serves as the Dungeon Master.
- Buffy the Vampire Slayer – In the episode "Chosen", Andrew, Xander, Giles, and one of the potential Slayers, Amanda, play Dungeons & Dragons while Anya sleeps at the table.
- Community – A second-season episode titled "Advanced Dungeons and Dragons" (AD&D) centers around the study group playing a game of Advanced Dungeons & Dragons to cheer up their near-suicidal classmate, "Fat Neil". Pierce's exclusion leads him to barge into the game, and torment everyone. A later episode called "Advanced Advanced Dungeons & Dragons" included a game of D&D which is played in order to reunite Buzz Hickey with his son.
- Corner Gas – In the episode "Happy Campers", Brent is seen playing a game of Dungeons & Dragons with a group of teenage boys in the city.
- Freaks and Geeks – The final episode of the series, titled "Discos and Dragons", Daniel (James Franco) is forced to join the Audio/Visual Club and the geeks invite him to a game of Dungeons & Dragons. He ends up enjoying it.
- Futurama - Gary Gygax guest starred as himself in the season two episode "Anthology of Interest I" where he, along with then-vice president Al Gore, Star Trek cast member Nichelle Nichols, and Stephen Hawking (all of whom guest starred as themselves) try to kill series protagonist Philip J. Fry to repair the space time continuum. They fail and end up playing Dungeons & Dragons for the next quadrillion years.
- Gravity Falls – The thirteenth episode of the second season, "Dungeons, Dungeons & More Dungeons", is centered around a game of a similar name based on mathematics, chance and imagination.
- The IT Crowd – In the fourth series episode titled "Jen The Fredo", Moss has been making his own Dungeons & Dragons game and eventually gets John, John, Roy, and Phil to play, entertaining his business connections and helping Roy relieve his depression.
- The Magicians – The eleventh episode of the first season, "Remedial Battle Magic", has the protagonists discover a Japanese spell called マジック ミサイル (majikku misairu) which causes Quentin to exclaim "Magic missile? That's like straight up Dungeons and Dragons."
- My Little Pony: Friendship is Magic – In the sixth season episode "Dungeons & Discords", Discord, Spike and Big McIntosh play a fantasy role-playing game titled Ogres & Oubliettes. In reference to this franchise crossover, Wizards of the Coast sponsored a D&D-themed charity fundraising campaign featuring the My Little Pony main characters, dubbed with the title Friendship & Magic, and a set of cards compatible with Magic: The Gathering.
- NewsRadio – In the episode "The Real Deal", Dave demonstrates to Jimmy that he manages the station as if it were a D&D game.
- The Sarah Silverman Program - In the second-season episode Bored of the Rings, a planned date night is disrupted by a Dungeons & Dragons game.
- The Simpsons – Homer tells how he bonded with some new geek friends by playing Dungeons & Dragons "for three hours ... then I was slain by an elf."
- Stranger Things – The main characters are seen playing Dungeons & Dragons, and the game both sets the tone and functions as a storytelling tool within the series. Monsters from the alternate reality known as the Upside Down are nicknamed after creatures from the game, like the Demogorgon, the Mind Flayer, and Vecna. Season 4 also depicts aspects of the moral panic surrounding D&D of the mid-1980s.
- Ted – In the episode "Dungeons & Dealers", the titular anthropomorphic teddy bear Ted, and his housemates Johnny and Blaire, play the game to win marijuana.
- That '70s Show – In the episode Radio Daze, Donna is asked if she and Eric would like to stay to play Dungeons & Dragons at the radio station where she works. At the end of the episode, two staff members are shown playing a session, with a cameo appearance by Alice Cooper who is also shown playing.
- Tucker's Luck – In the third series episode 7 Peter "Tucker" Jenkins played by Todd Carty played Dungeons & Dragons at his girlfriend's pal's house. The Dungeon Master was played by Charley Boorman.

== Other performance ==
=== Actual play ===
Actual play is a genre of podcast or web show in which people play tabletop role-playing games, such as Dungeons & Dragons, for an audience. Academic Emily Friedman, writing for Los Angeles Review of Books, commented that the largest "actual plays have viewer numbers that are the envy of some television networks [...] all while often being owned by the players on-screen". Dungeons & Dragons is played in these shows:

- Acquisitions Incorporated (2008–present) – In 2008, the creators of Penny Arcade partnered with Wizards of the Coast to create a podcast of a few 4th Edition Dungeons & Dragons adventures which led to the creation of the actual play Acquisitions Incorporated. After the podcast was well-received, the players began livestreaming games starting in 2010 at the PAX festival. Acquisitions Incorporated went on to be described by Inverse in 2019 as the "longest-running live play game". Friedman explained that many incorrectly attribute Acquisitions Incorporated as the start of actual play genre.
- The Adventure Zone (2014–present) – A special episode of the McElroy Brothers' flagship podcast My Brother, My Brother and Me called "The Adventure Zone" was released on August 18, 2014. It featured the brothers playing a game of Dungeons & Dragons with their father, Clint. The Adventure Zone was later developed into its own actual play podcast on the Maximum Fun network.
- Critical Role (2015–present) – An actual-play Dungeons & Dragons web series initially produced by Geek & Sundry and now produced by Critical Role Productions; it premiered on March 13, 2015. Matthew Mercer leads a group of several other fellow voice actors through D&D. The web series consists of multiple D&D campaigns. The group then started a Kickstarter in March 2019, raising over US$11 million in order to fund turning the first campaign into an animated series. This broke the previous record for the most-funded TV or film project on the crowdfunding website. The animated series, The Legend of Vox Machina (2022), was later picked up by Prime Video. Amazon MGM Studios then ordered a spin-off series set twenty years later, The Mighty Nein (2025), which adapts Critical Role's second campaign.
- Dimension 20 (2018–present) – An actual-play series produced by Dropout (formerly CollegeHumor) that often uses Dungeons & Dragons. It features Brennan Lee Mulligan as its primary Dungeon Master, and its seasons each feature distinct campaigns based on different settings.
- Dungeons & Daddies (2019–present) – A comedic actual-play Dungeons & Dragons podcast about four dads who initially must rescue their sons from the Forgotten Realms.
- HarmonQuest (2016–2019) – A part animated, part live action web series created by Dan Harmon and Spencer Crittenden. Prior to the creation of HarmonQuest, Harmon had included a Dungeons & Dragons-style segment at the end of the weekly podcast Harmontown. When Harmon pitched HarmonQuest, which was originally conceived as a low-budget online show, NBC Universal executive vice-president of digital enterprises Evan Shapiro became interested in the idea. When Seeso was developed as an NBC-owned comedy channel, the first season of the show was ordered.
- Natural Six (2024–present) – An actual-play series where six video game industry professionals play Dungeons & Dragons with Harry McEntire as the Dungeon Master.
- Not Another D&D Podcast (2018–present) – An actual-play podcast on the Headgum podcast network; hosted by CollegeHumor alumni Brian Murphy, Emily Axford, Jake Hurwitz, and Caldwell Tanner. In 2017, Hurwitz approached the trio curious about playing Dungeons & Dragons for the first time. Murphy then led the initiative to turn the invitation to play together into an actual play podcast; Hurwitz played his first session of D&D on the first episode of the podcast. The launch of Not Another D&D Podcast in 2018 took place amid a "renaissance" of actual play shows.
- Worlds Beyond Number (2023–present) – An actual play audio drama podcast created by Erika Ishii, Aabria Iyengar, Taylor Moore, Brennan Lee Mulligan, Lou Wilson. Their first campaign, entitled The Wizard, The Witch, & The Wild One, uses Dungeons & Dragons with Mulligan as the Dungeon Master.

=== Music ===
Dungeons & Dragons is referenced in popular music:

- Flashlight Brown's song "Ready to Roll" is a veiled reference to a group playing Dungeons & Dragons.
- Owen Pallett's album He Poos Clouds is roughly based on the concept of the eight schools of magic from Dungeons & Dragons.
- Stephen Lynch has a comedic song titled "D&D" on his album Superhero.
- Weezer's song "In The Garage" mentions the Dungeon Master's Guide and a twelve-sided die, among other nerdy elements.
- Jumpsteady's song from the album Master of the Flying Guillotine, "Dungeon Master" references the game.
- The Mountain Goats' 2019 album In League with Dragons was inspired by D&D.
- My Chemical Romance makes a reference to D&D in the intro to the official music video for their song "I'm Not Okay (I Promise)".

== Computer and video games ==
Dungeons & Dragons is referenced in popular video games:

- Tiny Tina's Assault on Dragon Keep (2012) – An expansion pack for Borderlands 2 (2012) which involves Tiny Tina serving as a game master of Bunkers and Badasses, the "Borderlands version of Dungeons & Dragons".
- (ASMR) Vin Diesel DMing a Game of D&D Just For You (2015) – Game based on American actor Vin Diesel's D&D fandom which was created by merritt k, a Canadian video game designer and developer.
- Life Is Strange: Before the Storm (2017) – In this game, the player can choose the option for the main character Chloe to join in on a D&D campaign.

== Players ==
Stephen Colbert developed an intense interest in the game during his youth, which he later credited for his talent at character creation. Ethan Gilsdorf credited the game for bestowing upon him "gifts of creativity and self-actualization". Actor Vin Diesel, in his introduction to the book Thirty Years of Adventure, wrote that he was "attracted to the artistic outlet the game provided" and that the game was "a training ground for our imagination and an opportunity to explore our own identities". Vin Diesel, Mike Myers, and Robin Williams also participated in the 2006 Worldwide Dungeons & Dragons Game Day, demonstrating that the game was then still a lively and active hobby.

Director Chris Weitz pointed out that there "are a lot of people who played and are horribly embarrassed about it and won't admit it, because it's part of their lives they put behind". He developed a fervent interest in the game, even greater than in making movies, and said the experience "had such an influence on his life". Director Jon Favreau was drawn into the game by the fantasy elements and the sense of story, saying "it gave me a really strong background in imagination, storytelling, understanding how to create tone and a sense of balance".

Political reporter John J. Miller said that Dungeons & Dragons was a big part of his life during his school years, and argued that, "there's a lot to admire about D&D and what it can do for kids by encouraging them to read, do math, and think creatively". Fantasy author China Miéville said that playing Dungeons & Dragons as a youth was one of the most enduring influences on his writing. The two things that particularly influenced him were "the mania for cataloging the fantastic" and "the weird fetish for systematization", in that everything is reduced to "game stats". In contrast, author Mark Barrowcliffe considers his years playing Dungeons & Dragons to be a wasted youth and all of the players to be nerds. He has tried to put the experience behind him.

=== List of notable D&D players ===
The following public figures have stated that they play, or have played, Dungeons & Dragons, indicating the game's broad appeal to a diverse range of talented individuals.

- Sherman Alexie, poet, novelist and young adult author
- Bill Amend, cartoonist
- Kevin J. Anderson, author
- Lee Arenberg, actor
- Mark Barrowcliffe, author
- Drew Barrymore, actress
- David Benioff, screenwriter
- Chester Bennington, musician
- Big Show, professional wrestler and actor
- Jim Butcher, author
- Ta-Nehisi Coates, author, senior editor of The Atlantic
- Stephen Colbert, Emmy Award winning comedian
- Anderson Cooper, Emmy Award television personality, news anchor author and author
- Terry Crews, actor and former football player
- Rivers Cuomo, musician
- Felicia Day, actress
- Judi Dench, actress
- Junot Díaz, Pulitzer Prize-winning novelist and short story writer
- Vin Diesel, actor
- Cory Doctorow, blogger, journalist, novelist, co-editor of the blog Boing Boing
- Lexa Doig, actor
- Tim Duncan, former NBA basketball player and member of the Basketball Hall of Fame
- Jon Favreau, actor, screenwriter and director
- James Franco, actor, author, director
- Ethan Gilsdorf, author, poet, teacher and journalist
- Michael Gove, conservative politician, journalist and author
- Joseph Gordon-Levitt, actor
- Matt Groening, Emmy Award-winning cartoonist, screenwriter, and producer
- James Gunn, film director and screenwriter
- Chris Hardwick, actor, writer and comedian
- Tim Harford, economist and journalist
- Brent Hartinger, author and playwright
- Dan Harmon, writer, performer and producer
- Dwayne Johnson, actor and professional wrestler
- Kimberly Kane, pornographic actress and director
- Paul S. Kemp, author
- Taran Killam, actor
- Stephen King, author
- Matthew Lillard, actor
- David Lindsay-Abaire, Pulitzer Prize-winning playwright and lyricist
- Michelle Malkin, conservative columnist
- Joe Manganiello, actor
- Marilyn Manson, musician
- Robert MacNaughton, actor
- George R. R. Martin, novelist, short story writer, screenwriter, and television producer
- Sharon McCrumb, novelist
- China Miéville, author
- John J. Miller, political reporter
- David Mitchell, novelist
- Moby, musician
- Tom Morello, musician
- Elon Musk, entrepreneur, CEO of SpaceX and Tesla Motors
- Mike Myers, actor
- Kumail Nanjiani, actor
- Steven Novella, podcast host, writer
- Alexis Ohanian, entrepreneur, investor
- Patton Oswalt, actor and comedian
- Trey Parker, co-creator of South Park
- Aubrey Plaza, actress
- Brian Posehn, actor and comedian
- Bruce Reyes-Chow, Presbyterian minister, writer
- John C. Reilly, theater actor, singer, and comedian
- Ed Robertson, musician
- R.A. Salvatore, fantasy novelist
- Curt Schilling, baseball player, sports broadcaster
- Kevin Smith, actor and director
- Zak Smith, artist and alternative porn star
- Steven Spielberg, film director, producer, screenwriter
- Dylan Sprouse, actor
- Martin Starr, actor
- Scott Stossel, editor of The Atlantic, author
- Rider Strong, actor
- Paul F. Tompkins, comedian and actor
- Mark Tremonti, musician
- Karl Urban, actor
- Vince Vaughn, actor
- Pendleton Ward, animator and screenwriter
- Gerard Way, comic book writer and musician
- D. B. Weiss, screenwriter
- Chris Weitz, producer, writer, director and actor
- Wil Wheaton, actor
- Joss Whedon, writer and director
- Robin Williams, Grammy, Emmy, and Academy Award-winning actor and comedian
- Daniel H. Wilson, author, television host, and robotics engineer
- Rainn Wilson, actor
- Deborah Ann Woll, actress
- Andrew Yang, entrepreneur, philanthropist and 2020 presidential candidate
- John Yuan, actor
- Matthew Yuan, actor
- Adrian Tchaikovsky, author
