= Widdershins (disambiguation) =

Widdershins means to go counterclockwise (anticlockwise) around an object, sometimes considered as unlucky.

Widdershins may also refer to:

== Literature ==
- Widdershins (novel), a 2006 fantasy novel by Charles de Lint
- Widdershins, a 1911 collection of ghost stories by Oliver Onions
- Widdershins, a 1995 collection of stories by Christine Harris
- Widdershins Adventures, a young adult series by Ari Marmell
- Widdershins (comic), an ongoing webcomic by Kate Ashwin

== Music ==
- Widdershins (album), a 2018 album by American singer-songwriter Grant-Lee Phillips
- Withershins (album), a 2010 album by indie pop band Smoosh (later called Chaos Chaos)
- The Widdershins, an Australian indie pop band

== Other ==
- Captain Widdershins, a character in A Series of Unfortunate Events (by Lemony Snicket)
