= Mega Girl =

Mega Girl or MegaGirl may refer to:

- The protagonist of the webcomic Strong Female Protagonist
- A character in the musical Starship
- A character in the animated television series Captain N: The Game Master
