= The Witch Boy =

The Witch Boy may refer to:

- Klarion the Witch Boy, a comics character
- The Witch Boy trilogy, a series of graphic novels
