= Shaun David Hutchinson =

American author (born 1978)

- Born: May 1, 1978 (age 48); West Palm Beach, Florida, U.S.
- Education: Jupiter Community High School; Florida Atlantic University
- Occupation: Author
- Writing career
- Genre: Young adult fiction
- Notable work: We Are the Ants (2016)
- Website: shaundavidhutchinson.com

Shaun David Hutchinson (born May 1, 1978) is an American author of young adult texts. His novels often "combine speculative elements with LGBT characters and themes."

== Personal life ==
Hutchinson was born May 1, 1978, in West Palm Beach, Florida, and grew up in Jupiter, Florida. He has three brothers and one half-sister. In his memoir, Brave Face, Hutchinson explains that, throughout his adolescence, "he struggled to understand his sexuality, his depression, and the suicide attempt that led to a search for self-acceptance." He has ADHD and is queer.

Hutchinson graduated from Jupiter High School, then studied medieval and renaissance literature at Florida Atlantic University, though he dropped out to work in information technology.

Hutchinson presently lives in Seattle, Washington.

== Career ==
Most of Hutchinson's novels include elements of speculative fiction. In an interview with The Horn Book, Hutchinson explained why he chooses this genre, saying it "gives [him] the space to explore human emotions in a richer way than [he] could do in straightforward contemporary fiction" because the genre "is frequently about looking toward the future, and though the future often seems bleak, ... it's also filled with hope and wonder — a necessary counterbalance to the realities of life."

== Selected texts ==
=== We Are the Ants (2016) ===
We Are the Ants was published January 19, 2016, by Simon Pulse with a 24-page companion story, "What We Pretend to Be", published on the publisher's website, Riveted, later that year.

The book was generally well received by critics, including starred reviews from Booklist, Kirkus Reviews, School Library Journal, Publishers Weekly, and Shelf Awareness. Kirkus called the book "[b]itterly funny, with a ray of hope amid bleakness". Shelf Awareness echoed the sentiment, calling the novel "bracingly smart and unusual". As if explaining the book's unusualness, School Library Journal compared the storyline and writing style to Nick Burd's The Vast Fields of Ordinary and Kurt Vonnegut's Slaughterhouse Five. Booklist further explained, "Hutchinson's excellent novel of ideas invites readers to wonder about their place in a world that often seems uncaring and meaningless. The novel is never didactic; on the contrary, it is unfailingly dramatic and crackling with characters who become real upon the page".

The Lambda Literary Foundation and Voice of Youth Advocates (VOYA) also praised the book for its thematic contents. VOYA said the novel tells "a very complex story about serious subjects". Lambda Literary expanded on the idea, saying it "is a book about more than love and loss; it's about struggling to find motivation and not taking the people in your life for granted". Both complimented Hutchinson's writing. Lambda Literary called the book "a beautiful, masterfully told story by someone who is at the top of his craft", and VOYA noted, "The voices of each character are strong and unique".

In 2017, We Are the Ants was included in the American Library Association's Rainbow List top 10 and was selected as one of the best 63 novels for young adults published in the previous twelve months. Time included the novel on their continuously updating "100 Best YA Books of All Time" list.

In 2022, We Are the Ants was listed among 52 books banned by the Alpine School District following the implementation of Utah law H.B. 374, "Sensitive Materials In Schools", 42% of which "feature LBGTQ+ characters and or themes". Many of the books were removed because they were considered to contain pornographic material according to the new law, which defines porn using the following criteria:

- "The average person" would find that the material, on the whole, "appeals to prurient interest in sex"
- The material "is patently offensive in the description or depiction of nudity, sexual conduct, sexual excitement, sadomasochistic abuse, or excretion"
- The material, on the whole, "does not have serious literary, artistic, political or scientific value".

=== At the Edge of the Universe (2017) ===
At the Edge of the Universe was published February 7, 2017, by Simon & Schuster Books for Young Readers.

The book was generally well received by critics, including starred reviews from Kirkus Reviews, Publishers Weekly, and Shelf Awareness. Kirkus called the book "[a]n earthy, existential coming-of-age gem," while Booklist called it "wrenching and thought provoking." Commenting on the book's plot and structure, Shelf Awareness said it is "delightfully constructed," and School Library Journal said it is "smartly written." Publishers Weekly highlighted how "Hutchinson uses a science fiction overlay to explore important topics."

At the Edge of the Universe is an American Library Association Rainbow List selection (2018), and the Chicago Public Library included it on their "Best Teen Fiction of 2017" list.

== Awards and honors ==
Below is an incomplete list of awards and honors Hutchinson's books have received.

Eight of Hutchinson's books are Junior Library Guild selections: We Are the Ants (2016), At the Edge of the Universe (2017), The Apocalypse of Elena Mendoza (2018), Brave Face (2019), The Past and Other Things That Should Stay Buried (2019), The State of Us (2020), A Complicated Love Story Set in Space (2021), and Before We Disappear (2022).

The Chicago Public Library has included two of Hutchinson's books on their year-end lists of the best books for teens: The Apocalypse of Elena Mendoza (2018), Brave Face (2019).

In 2017, Time magazine added We Are the Ants to their continuously updating "100 Best YA Books of All Time" list.

Awards and honors for Hutchinson's writing
| Year | Title | Award | Result | Ref. |
|---|---|---|---|---|
| 2016 | The Five Stages of Andrew Brawley | American Library Association Rainbow List | Selection | |
| 2016 | We Are the Ants | Goodreads Choice Award for Young Adult Fantasy & Science Fiction | Nominee | |
| 2017 | We Are the Ants | American Library Association Rainbow List | Top 10 | |
| 2017 | We Are the Ants | Best Fiction for Young Adults | Selection | |
| 2018 | At the Edge of the Universe | American Library Association Rainbow List | Selection | |
| 2018 | The Apocalypse of Elena Mendoza | Booklist Editors' Choice: Books for Youth | Selection | |
| 2019 | The Apocalypse of Elena Mendoza | Amelia Elizabeth Walden Award | Finalist | |
| 2019 | The Apocalypse of Elena Mendoza | Best Fiction for Young Adults | Selection | |
| 2019 | The Apocalypse of Elena Mendoza | American Library Association Rainbow List | Selection | |
| 2020 | Brave Face | Amazing Audiobooks for Young Adults | Selection | |
| 2020 | The Past and Other Things That Should Stay Buried | Quick Picks for Reluctant Young Adult Readers | Selection | |
| 2022 | A Complicated Love Story Set in Space | Amazing Audiobooks for Young Adults | Selection | |

== Publications ==
=== Anthologies ===
- Violent Ends (2015)
- Feral Youth (2017)

=== Nonfiction ===
- Brave Face: A Memoir (2019)

=== Novels ===
- The Deathday Letter (2010)
- FML (2013)
- The Five Stages of Andrew Brawley (2015)
- We Are the Ants (2016)
- At the Edge of the Universe (2017)
- The Apocalypse of Elena Mendoza (2018)
- The Past and Other Things That Should Stay Buried (2019)
- The State of Us (2020)
- A (Complicated) Love Story Set In Space (2021)
- Before We Disappear (2021)
- Howl (2022)

=== Short stories ===
- "Better" in Grim, edited by Christine Johnson (2014)
- "Please Remain Calm" in Been There, Done That, edited by Mike Winchell (2016)
- "The Inferno and the Butterfly" in All Out, edited by Saundra Mitchell (2018)
- "What We Pretend to Be," a We Are the Ants online exclusive from RivetedLit.com (2016)
- "Defying Definition" in (Don't) Call Me Crazy, edited by Kelly Jensen (2018)
- "Love is a Battlefield" in Battle of the Bands, edited by Eric Smith and Lauren Gibaldi (2021)
- "Spite and Malice" in Game On: 15 Stories of Wins, Losses, and Everything in Between, edited by Laura Silverman (2022)
