= Dig (2026 TV series) =

Upcoming American comedy series

- Genre: Comedy
- Created by: Michael Schur; Amy Poehler
- Based on: Excavations by Kate Myers
- Showrunners: Michael Schur; J. J. Philbin
- Starring: Amy Poehler; Geraldine Viswanathan; Fina Strazza; Antonia Thomas; Hugh Laurie
- Country of origin: United States
- Original language: English

Production
- Executive producers: Michael Schur; Amy Poehler; J. J. Philbin; Morgan Sackett; Dave Becky; David Miner; Sharon Jackson; Kate Arend; Jordan Grief; Kate Myers
- Production companies: Paper Kite Productions; J. J. Philbin Productions; Fremulon; Ocean Avenue; 3 Arts Entertainment; Universal Television

Original release
- Network: Peacock

Dig is an upcoming comedy television series created by Michael Schur and Amy Poehler. The series is based on the 2023 novel Excavations by Kate Myers. Myers is also an executive producer on the show. It is scheduled to premiere on November 23, 2026.

== Premise ==
Four archaeologists are working at an excavation site in Greece when they discover a secret that puts them in the midst of an international conspiracy.

== Cast ==
=== Main ===
- Amy Poehler as Elise
- Geraldine Viswanathan as Dylan, who after a five-year absence, returns to the dig in Greece on a whim to take care of some unfinished business.
- Fina Strazza as Patty, the undergraduate assistant to Neville. Patty is in way over her head and the dig represents the first time she has ever been outside of the U.S.
- Antonia Thomas as Clare, who oversees the dig site’s lab/museum as head preservationist. She’s most comfortable in a world of privilege and is slightly off-foot in the casual cargo-clad world of the dig.
- Hugh Laurie as Neville, a British professor who sincerely loves archaeology and strives to uphold the traditions of this venerable profession. He fancies himself an inspiring mentor to everyone who works at the site.

=== Recurring ===
- Jason Mantzoukas as Lambros, a local store owner and occasional looter
- Noma Dumezweni as Evelyn, Clare’s mother
- Brennan Lee Mulligan as Marcus “M.R.” Robertson Jr, a wealthy dilettante and potential patron of the dig

=== Guest ===
- Kayvan Novak
- Jon Pointing
- Bonita Friedericy
- Max Greenfield as Andrew, an art dealer
- Dan Bucatinsky as Fritz, a New York City museum director

== Episodes ==
No.	Title	Directed by	Written by	Original release date
1	"Pilot"	TBA	Amy Poehler & Michael Schur	November 23, 2026
2	"Pretty Woman"	TBA	Kassia Miller	November 23, 2026
3	"Dirt Crush"	TBA	Matteo Borghese & Rob Turbovsky	November 23, 2026
4	"How To Tell If You're a Demigod"	TBA	McKenna Thurber	November 23, 2026
5	"Hog's Big Day"	TBA	Berkley Johnson	November 23, 2026
6	"Best Person in the World"	TBA	Karen Chee	November 23, 2026
7	"Toss the Rooms"	TBA	Ama Anane	November 23, 2026
8	"To Catch a Branzino"	TBA	Amina Munir	November 23, 2026
9	"Only You"	TBA	Dani Shank	November 23, 2026
10	"Last Day"	TBA	J. J. Philbin	November 23, 2026

== Production ==
=== Development ===
In May 2025, Peacock announced that Schur and Poehler would be creating a new comedy series for the streaming service based on Myers's novel. Poehler would also star. It was the pair's first collaboration since the 2009 television series Parks and Recreation, which Schur created and Poehler starred in. J.J. Philbin, a screenwriter and Schur's wife, was announced as an executive producer and writer.

=== Casting ===
In December 2025, it was announced that Hugh Laurie and Geraldine Viswanathan had joined the cast alongside Poehler, later joined by Fina Strazza and Antonia Thomas to round out the main cast.

In August 2026, the series' guest stars were announced including, Kayvan Novak, Jon Pointing and Bonita Friedericy.

In October 2026, it was reported that Jason Mantzoukas, Brennan Lee Mulligan and Noma Dumezweni had landed recurring roles in the series, while Max Greenfield and Dan Bucatinsky joined as guest stars.

=== Filming ===
Filming began on January 12, 2026 and wrapped on May 7, 2026. It filmed at Universal Studios Hollywood.

== Release ==
The show is scheduled be released on Peacock with all episodes on November 23, 2026.

== Reception ==
On the review aggregator website Rotten Tomatoes, the series holds an approval rating of 88%, based on 8 reviews, with an average of rated reviews of 7/10. Metacritic, which uses a weighted average, assigned a score of 66 out of 100 based on 9 critics, indicating "generally favorable" reviews.
