= Dungeons & Dealers =

- Ted episode
- Brennan Lee Mulligan portrays Chris Bleth (pictured), the Dungeon Master who plays Dungeons & Dragons with the party in exchange for marijuana. Mulligan assisted both with the writing and directing of the episode, to ensure its accuracy.
- Episode no.: Season 2 Episode 3
- Directed by: Seth MacFarlane
- Written by: Chelsea Davison
- Original air date: March 5, 2026
- Running time: 31 minutes

Guest appearance
- Brennan Lee Mulligan as Chris Bleth

Episode chronology
← Previous "Mrs. Robichek"	Next → "The Mom's Bombed Rom-Com"

"Dungeons & Dealers" is the third episode of the second season of the American fantasy comedy series Ted. Written by Chelsea Davison and directed by Seth MacFarlane, it premiered on the American streaming service Peacock, along with the rest of season two, on March 5, 2026. The series acts as a precursor to the Ted film franchise, showcasing the childhood lives of the protagonists.

The series, set in the 1990s, focuses on John Bennett (Max Burkholder), the series' primary protagonist, a high-school-aged boy, along with Ted (MacFarlane), the series' titular anthropomorphic teddy bear. The two live with John's family, including Susan (Alanna Ubach), his mild-mannered mother, and Matty (Scott Grimes), his opinionated father. Also residing with the family is Blaire (Giorgia Whigham), his cousin. In the episode, Ted and John, along with Blaire, must play Dungeons & Dragons with a drug dealer, Chris Bleth (Brennan Lee Mulligan), in order to win a bag of marijuana promised to them. Unaware that there is marijuana involved, Susan and Matty join the game, trying to steer their kids towards family values.

The idea for both the episode and Mulligan's guest role came from Davison and Burkholder. Burkholder, a fan of Mulligan's work, recalled being "starstruck" during filming. Inspirations for MacFarlane in the episode's execution were the films Indiana Jones and the Temple of Doom and The Empire Strikes Back. He also worked closely with Mulligan—an avid Dungeons & Dragons player—to ensure the episode was accurate to the game. The set design and costumes were heavily scrutinized so that they could be as accurate as possible, with 25,000 pounds of dirt being shipped to the set for the former. Upon release, the episode received highly positive reviews from critics, with praise going particularly towards its humor, cast performances, and close depiction of the game.

== Plot ==
In 1990s Boston, teenager John Bennett is asked by his cousin Blaire for marijuana, since she has run out. However, John is also out, having smoked it with his roommate Ted, an anthropomorphic teddy bear. The three quickly go to the drug dealer Chris Bleth, a classmate of theirs. Concurrently, John's mother Susan and father Matty read that several teenagers vandalized a local church while high, and the two agree that they should try to push more family values. Blaire, Ted, and John find Chris playing the fantasy role-playing game Dungeons & Dragons, and he refuses to sell them marijuana after a frustrating campaign.

They convince Chris to start a new game with them in exchange for drugs if they win, and they begin the campaign at their house. Trying to bond with John, Matty and Susan join the campaign as well, unaware of the stakes. The game begins in a tavern, with the party in search of a hidden temple. A cultist tells them of an otherworldly entity in a temple, before handing them a map. Searching through the woods, a gnome merchant sells them weapons, and the party soon finds a temple guarded by an ogre. Ted distracts him with a song recapping the film Philadelphia, and they sneak in. They are soon trapped in a room with four statues, all giving them a riddle. Blaire accidentally steps on a tile that, when pressed, causes the ceiling to grow spikes that slowly descend towards them.

The party realizes that the riddle is about different elements, and answer correctly. The traps stop and they go to the next room. In it, they are warned about an invincible demon named Dral'hul by another cultist, but Matty impulsively kills him before they learn how to defeat Dral'hul. John angrily questions why Matty and Susan are even playing, and Susan says that she wants to keep John away from trouble, which he appreciates. Dral'hul enters and kills almost everyone, so Susan talks to him about his personal life to try and distract him. This works, and Dral'hul, moved by Susan's compassion, returns to his realm and leaves them treasure. Having won, Ted, while high with Blaire and John, asserts that perhaps they're in a game and Dungeons & Dragons is real, before the scene cuts to Dral'hul painting a portrait of them.

== Production ==
=== Development ===
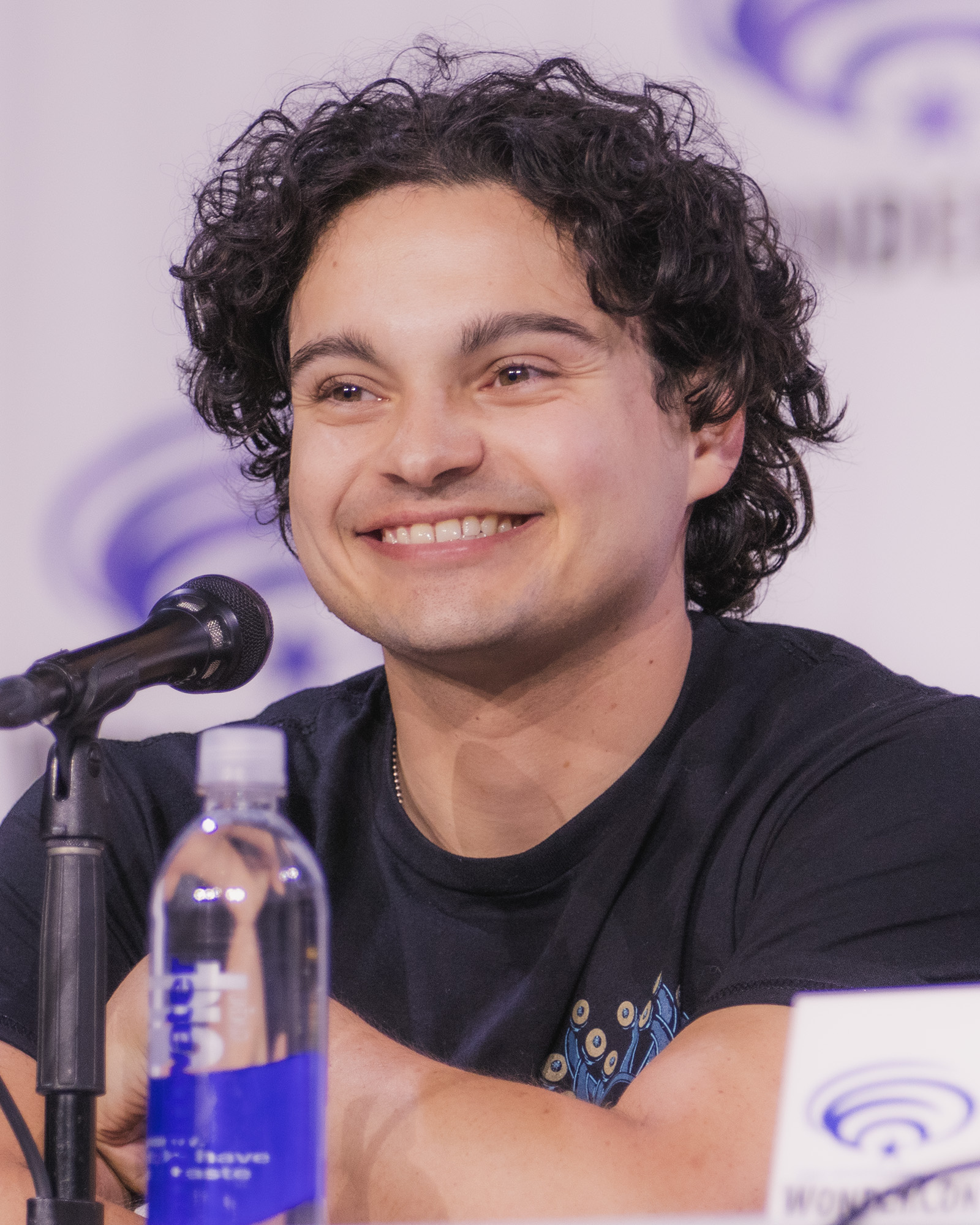
Max Burkholder, an avid fan of Dungeons & Dragons, helped to brainstorm the episode.

"Dungeons & Dealers" was directed by series creator and lead Seth MacFarlane, and written by Chelsea Davison in her first writing credit of the series. In the episode, Brennan Lee Mulligan guest stars as Ted and John's drug dealer and Dungeon Master. The series is a prequel to the Ted film franchise, and follows the childhood lives of their protagonists, John and Ted. MacFarlane noted that the episode is "one you can really only do in a season 2 [or] 3 once you've established your characters", having taken inspiration from the Star Wars film The Empire Strikes Back for its execution. The pacing and tone of the episode were specifically done in such a way to balance comedy with action. A major inspiration for this balance was the film Indiana Jones and the Temple of Doom, particularly for the scene with the descending spikes.

In "Dungeons & Dealers", John is not a fan of Dungeons & Dragons, but in real life, his actor Max Burkholder plays the game with his friends, and serves as the Dungeon Master. Burkholder is the one who pitched the idea of an episode based around the game. He also suggested bringing Mulligan in, as he was a fan of his work, such as Mulligan's Worlds Beyond Number podcast. He later stated that he had never "been as quiet on set" as when he worked with him, describing himself as "starstruck" on the days they filmed together. Davison knew Mulligan personally, which was another factor in securing him for the role. Although MacFarlane was not a fan of Dungeons & Dragons, Davison was, noting that they wanted to create an episode with the immense fanbase of the game in mind. Furthermore, a round of the game was played in the writing room to help them better understand the game's mechanics, and aspects of the round—such as a riddle Davison wrote—made it into the final episode. MacFarlane felt that John and Ted were "too cool" to be big fans of the game, and so they had to create a way for them to only play for a single episode that would force them into it.

Mulligan, who is famously a frequent player of Dungeons & Dragons, assisted MacFarlane in the episode's directing to ensure it was closely accurate to the game. MacFarlane asked Mulligan questions on what could and could not be done in it. Scott Grimes, who portrays Matty, praised MacFarlane for making the episode accurate, proclaiming himself as a nerd and describing it as "[something that] all the nerds out there are just going to adore [and] it's his gift to them". Susan's actress Alanna Ubach, despite having previous experience with Dungeons & Dragons from working on the fantasy television series The Legend of Vox Machina, did not understand the mechanics of the game. She noted that her son was a fan of it, but she still did not comprehend the game, so she tried playing it behind the scenes. Ubach felt that she had only "scratched the surface" of the game during the session. Grimes himself also stated that he was not a player of the game, having tried it once as a child, but ultimately dropping it. Mulligan assisted in writing the episode, as he, according to Grimes, had such chemistry during filming that made MacFarlane confident in letting him rewrite whole scenes.

=== Filming ===
==== Set design and technology ====
The sets were built mainly by MacFarlane, and Grimes noted that they filmed the majority of scenes on a sound stage. The idea was for the episode to be made as practically as they could, particularly with the forest scenes and the temple that the family encounters. On stage 9 of the Universal Studios Lot, the large forest set was placed, filling up nearly the entire space. The practical trees stood nine inches away from the blue screen technology, which wrapped 306 degrees around the set and was around 300 linear feet. To extend the background past the practical trees and enhance the atmosphere, visual effects were utilized, such as adding rays of sunshine or floating fairy dust to the backgrounds. Like the rest of the series, the episode was shot using Viewscreen; MacFarlane was able to act live with the cast as Ted due to Viewscreen, a technology that allows the production crew to visualize what Ted will look like in each scene in real time. This technology helped them through the scene where the spikes descend down. It also helped to "mix up" the production of the episode, which was mainly done on the large soundstage comprising multiple sets.

Burkholder and Giorgia Whigham, Blaire's actress, both praised the episode and its production, and recalled them being able to hang out in the cavern set for longer than usual. Whigham also stated that she had taken many behind-the-scenes photos on the sets in between filming. Similarly, Ubach mentioned "Dungeons & Dealers" as one of her favorite episodes to film. Nevertheless, Burkholder would go on to describe the shoot as a "slog", for how unexpectedly long filming took, going on for days. He commended Ubach and Whigham for being able to tolerate wearing such elaborate costumes during the extensive filming process. Makeup artist Howard Berger designed the practical effects for "Dungeons & Dealers", with his special effects company KNB EFX Group. For the four statues, dancers were fitted into gowns that held their heads and arms in a still position, and practical makeup was used for Dral'hul. To enhance his look, wings and a subtle ripple effect to his skin were added with visual effects. 25,000 pounds of dirt had to be shipped to the set to create the outdoor landscape stages, but inside the dirt was a cricket that repeatedly chirped and disrupted filming, noted Ubach.

==== Costumes ====
Burkholder recalled that the wizard robe he wore was very warm, making wearing it an uncomfortable experience. He asked the costume designer, Heather Pain, to give the robe as many pockets as she could, so it could look as authentic to fantasy aesthetics as possible. Grimes' outfit resembled that of a cleric's, having a "Friar Tuck wig", giving him a bald spot with hair around it. However, Grimes has red hair and pinkish skin, which made it hard to get the bald spot the correct shade. It took 16 people, according to Grimes, before they were able to get it right. He also called it "humbling" seeing how many freckles and "specks" they put on the bald spot. While Grimes enjoyed seeing the concept art for the costumes he would have to wear, he soon realized that he would have a bald spot in the episode and commented, "Is there anything for me to look cool in this show ever?" Pain stated that she wanted Ubach to wear armor that resembled the sweaters Susan would often wear, along with a 1970s-type "disco chainmail". Ubach enjoyed wearing the outfit, but found its heaviness to be difficult to manage, stating "I need help going to the bathroom, and I'll leave it at that. Wardrobe had to follow me to the bathroom so that I can take off my skirt and my sword and my 700 belts".

== Release and reception ==
The official poster for "Dungeons & Dealers"

"Dungeons & Dealers" was first released on March 5, 2026, on the American streaming service Peacock, along with the rest of the second season. The episode's Dungeons & Dragons theme and Mulligan's guest role were both revealed in a trailer for the season two months prior in January. According to Decider, it was the most anticipated episode of the season for fans.

For the 78th Primetime Emmy Awards, Peacock submitted "Dungeons & Dealers" to be nominated in multiple different categories, including Outstanding Directing for a Comedy Series, Outstanding Fantasy/Sci-Fi Costumes, Outstanding Period and/or Character Hairstyling, and Outstanding Guest Actor in a Comedy Series for Mulligan. Ultimately, the episode, along with the rest of the season, received no nominations.

Nate Richards of Collider described "Dungeons & Dealers" as the season's "most effective episode". He praised the way MacFarlane's humor was able to "seamlessly" blend into the world of the game, finding the performances of the entire cast to greatly add to its successful adaptation. At the end of his review, Richards hailed the episode as the best of the entire series. Similarly, it was labeled as the season's greatest episode by Rachel Weber of IGN, who lauded the way it was able to provoke genuine emotion out of the audience, but still be parodic to the point of not feeling too "strict". She particularly gave Burkholder and Davison props for creating an accurate portrayal of the game. MacFarlane himself listed Matty's "I already fucking hate this" line upon starting the game as his favorite moment from the episode, as well as a standout scene of the season.

Comic Book Resources writer Joshua M. Patton praised the episode as a solid replication of Dungeons & Dragons, likening it to the show Stranger Things, which he felt used it "sparingly" in a way that did not leave an impact. Patton asserted that having an entire episode revolve around the game was something that would leave a lasting impression on viewers, ultimately creating an installment built around the "goofiness and chaos" of the game that many players enjoy it for. Nick Valdez of ComicBook.com listed "Dungeons & Dealers" as the best television episode to ever cover the game. The main reasons for his praise were its accurate, comical portrayal of the game and its characters, the many references and large world building put into its short runtime, and correctly showcasing the "screwing around" nature of the game. Separately, Valdez ranked it as the season's second best episode, highlighting it for remaining culturally relevant as "[a way] to put the characters in a fun new world". While he felt it wasn't a completely perfect recreation of game's world, Valdez called it the only episode of the season where the plot revolves around the entire family focused on a single goal. He ended his review by asserting that it "finds a really fun and sweet way [to] prove how Susan is the best character".

== See also ==
- Dungeons & Dragons in popular culture
