= The Deep Dark =

2024 graphic novel by Lee Knox Ostertag

- Date: June 4, 2024
- Page count: 480 pages
- Publisher: Graphix/Scholastic

Creative team
- Writer: Lee Knox Ostertag
- Artist: Lee Knox Ostertag
- ISBN: 9781338840001

The Deep Dark is a 2024 young adult graphic novel by Lee Knox Ostertag. Originally serialized on Substack, it was published as a graphic novel by Graphix on June 4, 2024.

== Plot ==
Mags, a butch girl caring for her sick grandmother, must satisfy a monster living in her basement with her blood every night. When she reunites with her childhood friend Nessa, a trans girl, the two fall in love.

== Development ==
The book was originally serialized in weekly installments on Substack under the title Darkest Night, starting in 2021.

== Reception ==
The book was given a starred review by Kirkus Reviews, which stated that "Well-drawn, deeply realized characters enliven this spellbinding and fantastical queer coming-of-age love story." It also received starred reviews from BookPage and Publishers Weekly. Reviewers noted the contrast between full-color past scenes and present-day black and white scenes.

School Library Journal, TheGamer, and the Horn Book also reviewed the book. Book Riot included it in a list of "The Best Comics We Read July-September 2024"

=== Accolades ===
Year	Award/Honor	Result	Ref.
2025	Ringo Award for Best Original Graphic Novel	Shortlisted	
2025	Hugo Award for Best Graphic Story or Comic	Shortlisted	
2025	Harvey Award for Best Young Adult Book	Shortlisted	
2025	Eisner Award for Best Publication for Teens	Shortlisted	
2025	Michael L. Printz Award	Honored	
2025	American Library Association's Great Graphic Novels for Teens	Included	
2024	Publishers Weekly Best Books of the Year	Included	
2024	Kirkus Reviews Best Teen & YA Graphic Literature of 2024	Included	

== See also ==
Other graphic novels by Lee Knox Ostertag:

- The Witch Boy trilogy
- The Girl from the Sea
