= The Girl from the Sea =

2021 graphic novel by Lee Knox Ostertag

- Date: June 1, 2021
- Page count: 256 pages
- Publisher: Graphix

Creative team
- Writer: Lee Knox Ostertag
- Artist: Lee Knox Ostertag
- ISBN: 978-1-338-54058-1

The Girl From the Sea is a 2021 fantasy romance graphic novel by Lee Knox Ostertag. It follows a young girl who enters a romantic relationship with a selkie.

== Plot ==
Morgan Kwon, a closeted teenager, awaits the day she can leave her home on Wilneff Island in Canada for college. However, after falling into the sea, she is rescued by a mysterious girl named Keltie who turns out to be a selkie. The two fall in love, but their relationship is complicated by Keltie's brashness and a cruise ship that threatens the environment of Keltie's home.

== Reception ==
The book was given starred reviews by Publishers Weekly and School Library Journal. Publishers Weekly praised the "artistically and textually strong characters [that] are easy to root for".

Kirkus Reviews described The Girl from the Sea as "Sweet, fun, Sapphic fluff".

=== Accolades ===
Year	Award/Honor	Result	Ref.
2022	British Fantasy Award for Best Comic/Graphic Novel	Won	
2022	GLAAD Media Award for Outstanding Graphic Novel/Anthology	Shortlisted	
2022	Great Graphic Novels for Teens	Top Ten	
2022	Quick Picks for Reluctant Young Adult Readers	Top Ten	
2022	American Library Association Rainbow Book List	Top Ten	
2021	Cybils Awards for Graphic Novel	Shortlisted	

== See also ==
Other graphic novels by Lee Knox Ostertag:

- The Witch Boy trilogy
- The Deep Dark
