= Lee Knox Ostertag =

American cartoonist and writer (born 1991)

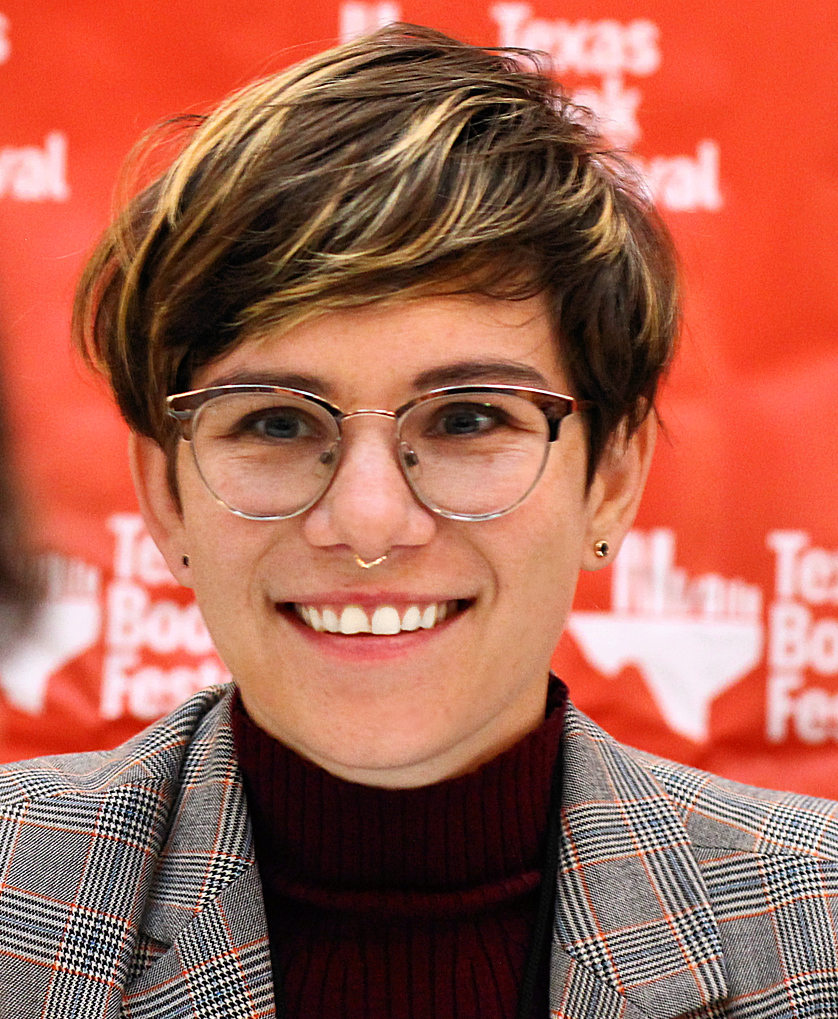
- Ostertag at the 2019 Texas Book Festival
- Born: October 28, 1991 (age 35)
- Spouse: ND Stevenson (m. 2019)
- Website: leeknoxostertag.com

Lee Knox Ostertag (previously Molly Knox Ostertag, born October 28, 1991) is an American cartoonist and writer. His work includes the animated series The Owl House, webcomic Strong Female Protagonist, the graphic novels The Witch Boy trilogy, The Girl from the Sea, and The Deep Dark, and on the series Tales of the Night Watchman. He was named one of Forbes magazine's 30 Under 30 in 2021.

== Early life ==
Ostertag grew up in upstate New York. He attended Bard College and studied illustration and cartooning at the School of Visual Arts (SVA) in New York City, where he graduated in 2014. He moved from upstate New York to Los Angeles in 2016.

== Career ==
=== Comics ===
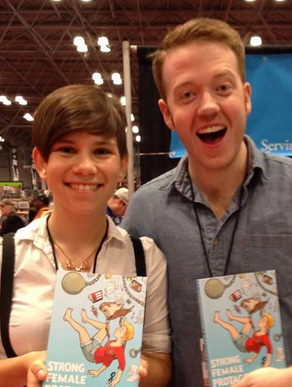
Ostertag with Strong Female Protagonist writer Brennan Lee Mulligan

As a comics artist, Ostertag drew the superhero webcomic Strong Female Protagonist written by Brennan Lee Mulligan from 2012 to 2018, and created the art for the fantasy comic Shattered Warrior written by Sharon Shinn (2017). His first published work came in 2013 and 2014 when he drew two issues of Tales of the Night Watchman for So What? Press, "The Night Collector" (2013) and "It Came from the Gowanus Canal" (2014). The latter remains one of the series' best-selling issues. In 2016, some of his comics appeared in an anthology with other comic artists titled Chainmail Bikini. Two years before, in 2014, Ostertag appeared in the documentary She Makes Comics.

In 2017, Graphix published The Witch Boy, the first graphic novel written and drawn by Ostertag. It is the coming-of-age story of a young boy, Aster, who is intent on becoming a witch in a community where boys are expected to become shapeshifters. Fox Animation acquired the film rights in May 2017, and a sequel, The Hidden Witch, was published in 2018. The third book in the series, The Midwinter Witch, was published in November 2019. The Witch Boy was later described by Daniel Toy of CNN's Underscored as an "emotional, magical story [that] will grab young readers’ attention" which teaches readers the "importance of acceptance and love" while reviewers said that the story of Aster, which begins in the first book, is "parable for gender conformity". Additionally, Aster's tomboy friend, Charlotte "Charlie", who has two dads, is described as not conforming to gender norms, even by the book's publisher, Scholastic. Other works of Ostertag's include the erotic comic Alleycat and the comic How the Best Hunter in the Village Met Her Death, for which he received the 2018 Ignatz Award for Outstanding Story.

Paste described Ostertag's character design as "deft and varied, with a thick, dark line that resembles that of Faith Erin Hicks", noting that he "mostly uses [his] figures' eyes and their body language to convey emotions". A profile by SVA described his work as "consistently featur[ing] diverse casts of characters—multiracial, of differing gender expressions, sexual orientations, and abilities—whose adventures intertwine social justice and superheroes, peer pressure and magical powers", and noted that his "presiding interest lies in queer content in young adult work". Additionally, Erica Friedman of Yuricon, a long time fan of Ostertag, praised his work, How the Best Hunter in the Village Met Her Death, calling it a tale that will resonate with those "who have come through their own dark forests and transformed into their true selves".

In 2021, Ostertag's graphic novel The Girl from the Sea was published. He described it as "teen summer romance graphic novel" set in Nova Scotia, focused on the story of a 15-year-old Korean Canadian girl named Morgan falling in love with a selkie named Keltie. (Note: In a tweet on December 10, 2020, Ostertag said that Morgan is Korean Canadian while Keltie is "white with a summer tan".) He noted that it is somewhat based on his experience spending summers at Wilneff Island in Nova Scotia as a kid and called the book his "first serious foray" into the romance genre. The Girl from the Sea was a finalist for the GLAAD Media Award for Outstanding Original Graphic Novel/Anthology.

In August 2021, Ostertag was among a group of creators with whom fellow comics writer Nick Spencer formed a deal with the subscription-based newsletter platform Substack to publish creator-owned comics stories, essays, and instructional guides on that platform.

=== Animation ===
In animation, Ostertag has been working since 2014 as a designer for Star vs. the Forces of Evil and as a writer for The Owl House and ThunderCats Roar. In October 2020, he called on Amazon to let him make an animation "centered around Hobbit children in The Shire". In January 2021, it was announced that Netflix was adapting his graphic novel, The Witch Boy, into an animated musical directed by Minkyu Lee.

On December 11, 2020, a project by Ostertag, for Disney Television Animation under the name Neon Galaxy, was registered. In September 2024, Ostertag announced that Neon Galaxy, a series set "in the distant future", was not moving forward at Disney, noting that it had been cancelled a few months prior despite production work for four and a half years and positive response from "kids who saw materials in early demographic testing" and songs by Betty Who. He also noted that it is a "weird, bad time" in the U.S. animation industry, with difficulty in getting series approved, and hoped The Animation Guild can win gains from the Alliance of Motion Picture and Television Producers during negotiations for a new contract, and said that "for now, this is a farewell" for Neon Galaxy while adding "maybe one day I’ll be back." In November 2024, following the leak of the shelved Moon Girl and Devil Dinosaur episode "The Gatekeeper", Ostertag speculated that Neon Galaxy was "killed" because two members of the main cast were openly transgender. In December 2025, in response to The Walt Disney Company inking a three-year licensing deal with Sora (OpenAI) for short AI generated videos on Disney+, Ostertag mentioned that Disney's legal department threatened him for sharing artwork from Neon Galaxy to the public.

=== Other writings ===
From July to September 2020, Ostertag published a The Lord of the Rings fanfiction titled "In All the Ways There Were" which shipped Frodo Baggins and Samwise "Sam" Gamgee together, a story which became relatively popular. He called the fan fiction an extension of his "Lord of the Rings obsession", even creating an alternate Twitter account on the subject, with the handle @hobbitgay, and stated he is also writing a romantic fan fiction "retelling the entire series from Sam Gamgee’s point of view". Furthermore, he stated that he saw The Lord of the Rings as a romance and argued that he rarely sees exploration of "romance as transformative", portrayed, in fiction, with authenticity. Additionally, in 2019, Ostertag created a fan comic depicting a post-credits scene of The Return of the King.

In August 2021, Ostertag began writing a newsletter about graphic novels titled "In The Telling".

In October 2021, Ostertag announced that he would be releasing a graphic novel entitled "Darkest Night" online in weekly installments for paying subscribers, which would focus on a relationship between a teenage cis butch girl (Mags) and a teenage trans girl (Nessa), and later was released to general subscribers. The graphic novel was published under the title The Deep Dark in a physical form, in a 480-page book, by Scholastic, in 2024. Ostertag called it a "laborious, really annoying process" and said he started the story from a "place of frustration". He also told TheGamer that he is ok with making "people uncomfortable" with his stories, and expressed a desire to have more "butch lesbians...fat characters...visibly trans characters...[and] super femme gay men" in his stories who are just "hanging out and existing" and said that despite abundance for queer media presently, people involved in productions for big companies are "afraid of getting it wrong". The Deep Dark was a 2025 Hugo Award finalist for Best Graphic Story or Comic.

On his Tumblr, Ostertag is working on an ongoing webcomic titled Watson's Sketchbook, which reinterprets the original Arthur Conan Doyle characters Sherlock Holmes and Dr. Watson as being in a romantic relationship. A physical copy of the project is available on his website.

== Personal life ==
Ostertag identified as a "gay lady" in 2016 (Note: "I'm a gay lady! Favorite activities include making comics, running D&D, and dating an amazing girl #queerselflove pic.twitter.com/H2hqItMHC4. — Molly Knox Ostertag (@MollyOstertag) June 15, 2016.") and married fellow cartoonist Nate "ND" Stevenson in September 2019. Stevenson began working on She-Ra and the Princesses of Power at the same time he began dating Ostertag, who was influential on the show "from the very beginning", coming up with a major plot twist in the show's final season.

In August 2025, Ostertag announced he had chosen the name Lee and the pronouns he/him, which he had been using with his friends prior to the announcement. He added that his previous name, Molly, was "Victorian slang for a gay man", calling it "quite apt".

== Bibliography ==
=== Graphic novels ===
==== Graphic novel series ====
- The Witch Boy trilogy
  - The Witch Boy (writer/artist, Graphix, 2017)
  - The Hidden Witch (writer/artist, Graphix, 2018)
  - The Midwinter Witch (writer/artist, Graphix, 2019)
- Dungeons & Dragons: Dungeon Club
  - Roll Call (writer, art by Xanthe Bouma, HarperCollins Children's Books, 2022)
  - Time to Party (writer, art by Xanthe Bouma, HarperCollins Children's Books, 2024)
  - Final Face-off (writer, art by Xanthe Bouma, HarperCollins Children's Books, 2025)

==== Other graphic novels ====
- Tales of the Night Watchman (So What? Press, 2011–Present)
- Rick and Morty: Lil' Poo-py Superstar #3 (Oni Press, variant cover, 2016)
  - "The Night Collector" (artist, 2013) & "Sanctuary" (characters co-created by, 2018)
  - "It Came from the Gowanus Canal" (artist, 2014) & "It Came from the Gowanus Canal...Again!" (characters co-created by, 2017)
- Shattered Warrior (artist, written by Sharon Shinn, Macmillan, 2017)
- The Girl from the Sea (writer/artist, Graphix, 2021)
- Darkest Night (writer/artist, Substack, 2021)
- The Deep Dark (writer/artist, Graphix, 2024)

=== Role-playing games ===
- Van Richten's Guide to Ravenloft (writer, Wizards of the Coast, 2021)

=== Webcomics ===
- Alleycat (writer/artist, 2017)
- How the Best Hunter in the Village Met Her Death (writer/artist, 2018)
- Strong Female Protagonist (artist, written by Brennan Lee Mulligan, 2012–2018)
- Queens of the Steppe (writer/artist, 2015)

== Filmography ==
=== Film ===
Film roles
Title	Year	Role	Notes
She Makes Comics	2014	As himself	Original art in this documentary
Water Dogs	2014	—N/a	Concept art
Neil Gaiman: Dream Dangerously	2016	—N/a	Original art in this documentary

=== Television ===
Television roles
Title	Year	Credited as			Role	Notes
Title	Year	Writer	Director	Animation/Art department	Role	Notes
Star vs. the Forces of Evil	2016–2019	No	No	Yes	—N/a	Prop design on 30 episodes and prop designer on 4 episodes (Note: Specifically "Stump Day/Holiday Spellcial", "Starcrushed", "Face the Music", and "Bon Bon the Birthday Clown".)
The Owl House	2020–2023	Yes	No	No	—N/a	Staff writer on 36 episodes, and writer on 5 episodes. (Note: These five episodes were "Wing It Like Witches", "Enchanting Grom Fright", "Escaping Expulsion", "Through the Looking Glass Ruins", and "Yesterday's Lie".)
ThunderCats Roar	2020	No	Yes	No	—N/a	Teleplay for 3 episodes. (Note: Specifically "Prince Starling's Quest", "Berserkers", and "Warrior Maiden Invasion")
Neon Galaxy	TBA	Yes	Yes	Yes	—N/a	Creator

=== Web shows and series ===
Web shows and series roles
Title	Year	Role	Notes
Critical Role	2017	Wendy Darling	Dungeons & Dragons web series; Episode: "Once Upon a Fairytale Cruise"
Adventuring Academy	2019	Himself	Podcast and web series; Episode: "Finishing a Campaign (with Molly Ostertag)"
