= Brennan Lee Mulligan =

American writer, actor and gamemaster (born 1988)

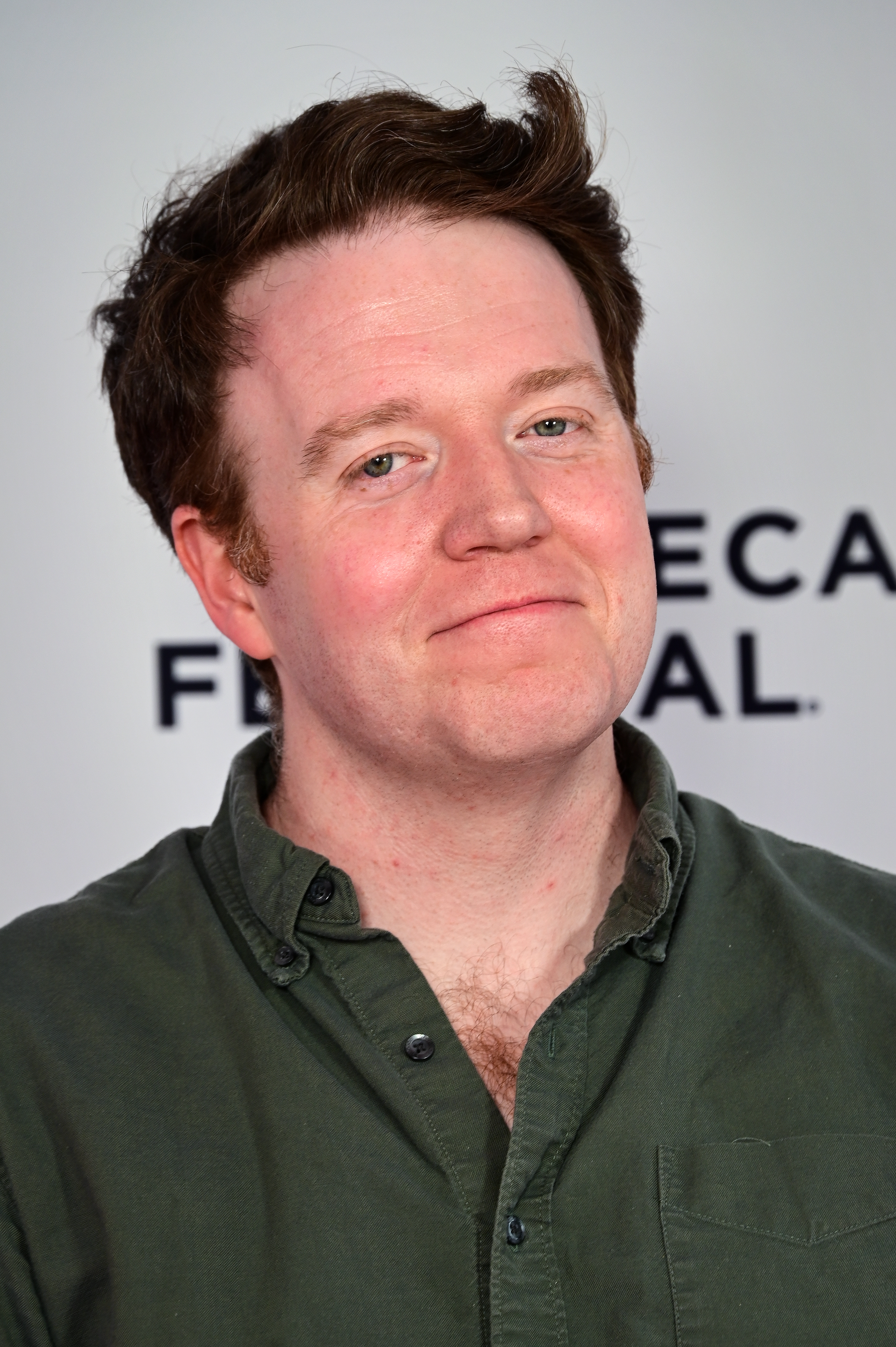
- Mulligan in 2026
- Born: January 4, 1988 (age 38); New York City, U.S.
- Education: SUNY Ulster (AA); School of Visual Arts (BFA)
- Occupations: Writer; performer; gamemaster
- Years active: 2012–present
- Employers: Dropout; Story Pirates; Upright Citizens Brigade
- Spouse: Isabella Roland (m. 2023)
- Children: 2
- Parents: Joe Mulligan (father); Elaine Lee (mother)
- Relatives: Claudia Lonow (mother-in-law)
- Awards: Webby Award (2019)
- Website: brennanleemulligan.com

Brennan Lee Mulligan (born January 4, 1988) is an American comedian, actor, writer, and gamemaster. He often works with Dropout (formerly CollegeHumor) as a writer, performer, and producer. He is the creator and regular gamemaster for Dropout's actual play series Dimension 20 as well as the dungeon master for the first campaign of the creator-owned actual play podcast Worlds Beyond Number and the fourth campaign of the actual play web series Critical Role.

He also wrote the superhero webcomic Strong Female Protagonist (2012–2018) alongside artist Lee Knox Ostertag.

== Early life ==
Brennan Lee Mulligan was born on January 4, 1988, in New York to actress and writer Elaine Lee and comedian Joe Mulligan. He is of Irish descent. He was introduced to the role-playing game Dungeons & Dragons by his mother at age nine, first gamemastering at age ten.

Mulligan was introduced to theatrical gaming while attending the Hudson Valley Beltane Festival at age eleven. He started attending The Wayfinder Experience, a live-action role-playing summer camp, spending much of his teenage years working as a lead story writer, performer, and camp counselor there. At age 15, Mulligan and his brother co-founded Bootleg Adventures, organizing one-day live-action role-playing games to introduce children to theatrical gaming. In an interview with the Times-Herald Record, a 16-year-old Mulligan expressed conviction in theatrical gaming's potential to enable "kids [to] come out healthier beings than when they first arrive".

He dealt with significant bullying in elementary school and struggled with realizing he had responded to this by becoming a bully himself. He was also homeschooled as a youth. In 2005, at 17 years old, Mulligan graduated from SUNY Ulster with an associate degree, having majored in philosophy and humanities. In 2009, Mulligan graduated from the School of Visual Arts with a Bachelor of Fine Arts in screenwriting.

After graduating from university, Mulligan briefly worked as a camera PA on the set of Law & Order: Criminal Intent.

== Career ==
=== Writing ===
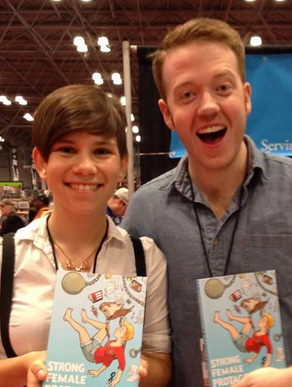
Mulligan with Strong Female Protagonist artist Lee Knox Ostertag

Mulligan and Lee Knox Ostertag co-created the webcomic Strong Female Protagonist, which was named one of io9's Best New and Short Webcomics of 2012. In 2015, Strong Female Protagonist won an Autostraddle Comic and Sequential Art Award.

In 2017, Mulligan joined CollegeHumor as a writer and fact-checker for Um, Actually: The Web Series. His audition tape included an impression of Tim Curry eating pizza, which allegedly got him the job. In 2018, CollegeHumor's streaming service Dropout launched Um, Actually as a game show, with Mulligan continuing to write for the show until 2020. Mulligan was also a writer for several scripted shows on Dropout, including the Star Wars parody space saga Troopers, and the mockumentary Gods of Food. In August 2025, Variety reported that Mulligan had "struck a new three-year development deal" with Dropout.

In 2023, Mulligan was a writer for Foul Play, an interactive murder mystery series created by Andrew Barth Feldman and Alex Boniello.

=== Performing ===
In his twenties, he performed and taught comedy at the Upright Citizens Brigade (UCB). It was working at the UCB that led Mulligan to working at CollegeHumor, (premiering on December 14, 2017, with Who's the Real Cop?). He has appeared on, and is an executive producer of, the comedy panel game show Game Changer and the spin-off improv show Make Some Noise on Dropout. He has also appeared on other Dropout shows such as Very Important People and Gastronauts.

In March 2026, Mulligan was a guest in "Dungeons & Dealers" for the television series Ted (2024); Mulligan helped rewrite the episode on set. That month, Mulligan also appeared on the new web series Jeopardy! YouTube Edition as a contestant. Mulligan has a recurring role in the upcoming television series Dig which is scheduled to premiere on November 23, 2026. He will also host the companion podcast.

==== Actual play ====
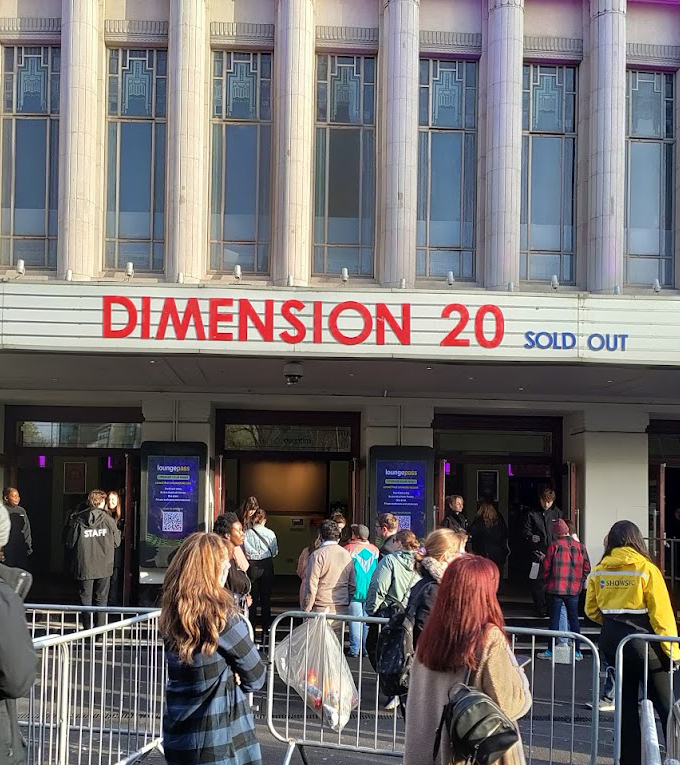
Dimension 20 at the Hammersmith Apollo during the 2024 UK and Ireland tour

Since 2018, Mulligan has been an executive producer, writer, and gamemaster for Dimension 20 on Dropout (which also hosts his video podcast, Adventuring Academy). In his capacity as a professional D&D gamemaster, he has been cited by Bleeding Cool, Comic Book Resources, Wired, and Wizards of the Coast's own Dungeons & Dragons podcast—Dragon Talk. Glen Weldon, in a review of Dimension 20 for NPR, commented that "Mulligan is such a good DM and he's got so many improv skills. He's such a close and responsive listener that no matter what the players throw at him, he can always roll with it, without breaking the game. And that is a very rare skill, so it's terrific stuff".

Mulligan was the Dungeon Master for Exandria Unlimited: Calamity, a weekly, four-part actual play web series spin-off of Critical Role that premiered on May 26, 2022. He returned to Critical Role in 2024 as the Dungeon Master of the three-part special titled "Downfall" for the show's third campaign. Mulligan was then the Dungeon Master for Exandria Unlimited: Divergence which premiered on February 13, 2025.

In January 2023, it was announced that Mulligan, along with Erika Ishii, Aabria Iyengar, and Lou Wilson, would star in the creator-owned actual play podcast Worlds Beyond Number. The show launched on March 1, 2023, and quickly became one of the top 20 Patreon accounts in the world; Mulligan was the "inaugural game master". The first book of this campaign ran for four seasons with the finale airing in August 2025. The next campaign premiered in March 2026 with Iyengar as the game master and Mulligan shifting to a player role.

In August 2025, Critical Role announced that Mulligan would take over as Game Master from Matthew Mercer for their fourth campaign. The new campaign premiered on October 2, 2025 and features a new world "outside its usual Exandria setting". Rolling Stone stated that "the inclusion of Mulligan is huge, but not entirely surprising" given Mulligan's background as "a well-established Game Master" who created the "titanic success" Dimension 20 along with previous comments made by Mercer on eventually shifting "into a 'Professor X' role as a mentor to the next generation of storytellers rather than remaining the face of the brand in perpetuity". Also in October 2025, Mulligan was the Dungeon Master for the Endless Dungeon tour in Australia.

== Accolades ==
He has received an "Excellence in Performance Award" from the New York International Fringe Festival, and won a 2019 Webby Award in the "Comedy: Shortform" category for his CollegeHumor skit, Tide CEO: You Gotta Stop Eating Tide Pods. In 2025, his series Dungeons and Drag Queens won "Best Web Series" at the Queerty Awards. In 2026, Critical Role won "Best Role-Play Streamer" at The Streamer Awards.

== Personal life ==
Mulligan is the godson of comics artist and writer Michael Kaluta. In November 2015, Mulligan was a contestant on the American version of Who Wants to Be a Millionaire and won $50,000 after incorrectly answering the $100,000-question. By 2020, he lived in Los Angeles.

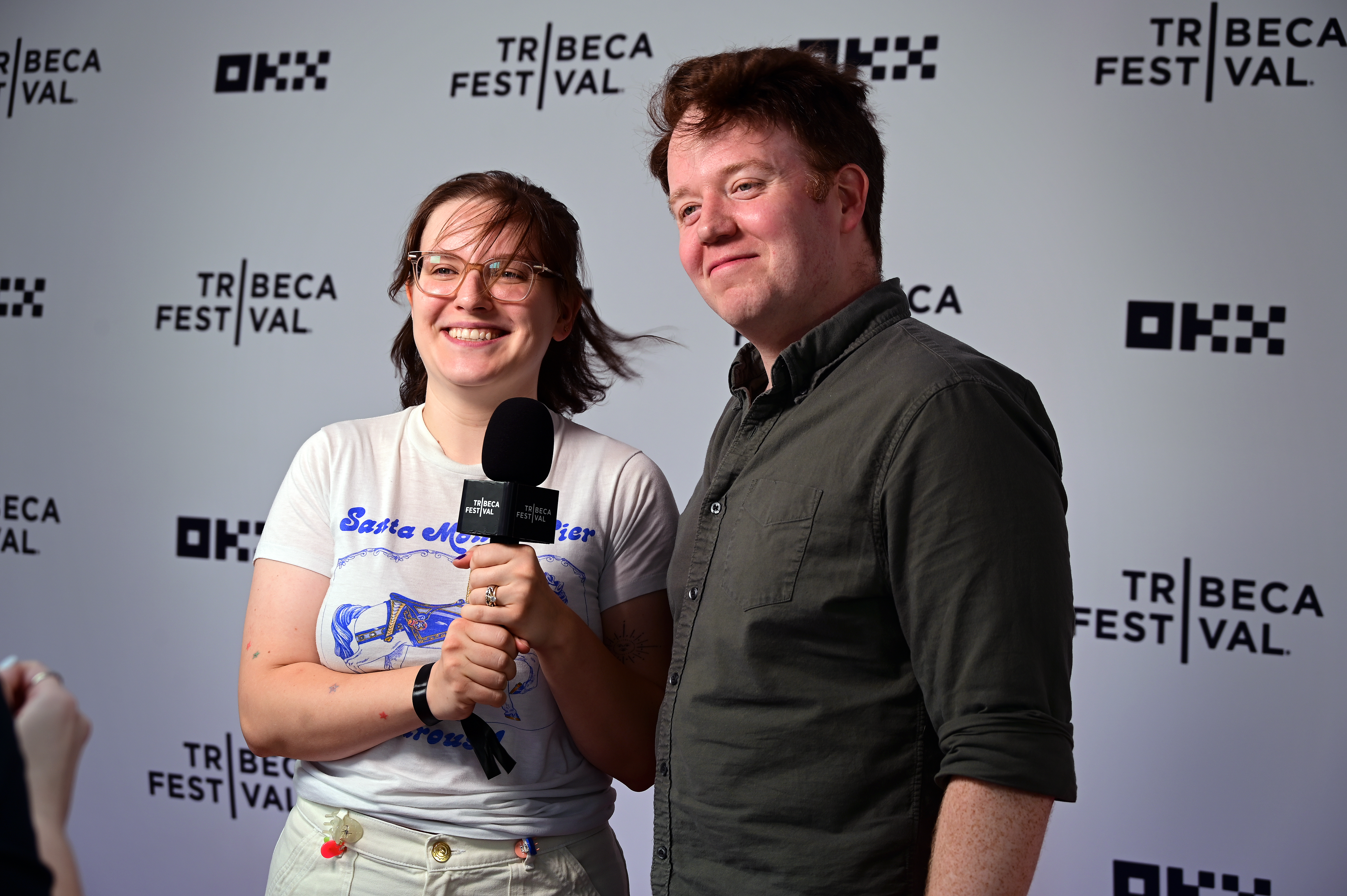
Isabella Roland and Mulligan at the 2026 Tribeca Festival

Mulligan met Isabella "Izzy" Roland through his work with UCB, and the two began dating in 2017, the same week he was hired at CollegeHumor. On January 21, 2021, Mulligan announced their engagement via Instagram. They married on April 1, 2023. On January 23, 2024, Brennan announced the birth of the couple's first child, a daughter, on the Patreon feed for the podcast Worlds Beyond Number. On March 31, 2026, on Jeopardy! YouTube Edition, Mulligan mentioned that he and Roland had another daughter.

Politically, Mulligan is a socialist. In August 2023, during the 2023 Writers Guild of America and SAG-AFTRA strikes, Mulligan led a Dungeons & Dragons-themed picket day at Universal Studios where the final boss was AMPTiamat. In 2026, Mulligan supported the Los Angeles DSA local election slate, hosting a Dungeons & Dragons game with the candidates which raised over $30,000.

== Filmography ==
=== Television ===
Year	Title	Role	Notes
2015	Who Wants to Be a Millionaire?	Himself	2 episodes
2018–2019	Adam Ruins Everything	Supporting roles	2 episodes
2019	Hot Date	Man	Episode: "Apartment Hunting"
2026	Ted	Chris	Episode: "Dungeons & Dealers"
2026	Dig †	Marcus "M.R." Robertson Jr	Recurring role

=== Film ===
Year	Title	Role	Ref.
2016	Bev (short film)	Bev	
2025	D(e)ad	Owen	

=== Web ===
Year	Title	Role	Notes	Ref.
2015	Locke & Key	Tyler (voice)	Audio drama	
2013	Teacher's Lounge	Matt		
2017–2020	CollegeHumor Originals	Various		
2017	Fallen For You	Todd	Pilot released on YouTube	
2018–present	Dimension 20	Dungeon Master, various	Also creator, executive producer	
2018	Liverspots and Astronots	Lancery (voice), various		
2019–present	Adventuring Academy	Himself		
2019–present	Game Changer	Himself	Also executive producer	
2019–2022	Mission to Zyxx	Kor Balevore (voice)	9 episodes	
2019	The Adventure Zone: The Dadlands	Game Master		
2019	Ultramechatron Team Go!	Galatax		
2020	Rude Tales of Magic	Kreedis (voice)	Episode: "Mountaintop"	
2021	Hello from the Magic Tavern	Kalhaxorus the Grim (voice)	3 episodes	
2021	L.A. by Night	Adrian Clairmont	Episode: "Live on the Moon", Episode: "Reign in Hell"	
2021	Battle for Beyond	Nikhil		
2022	Legends of the Multiverse	Dungeon Master		
2022	Roll20 10 year Anniversary stream	Citizen Doctor Abraham Mehermblur	3 episodes	
2022	Exandria Unlimited: Calamity	Dungeon Master	4 episodes	
2022	Dirty Laundry	Himself	Episode: "Who Stayed Up for 81 Hours?"	
2022–present	Make Some Noise	Himself	Also executive producer	
2022–present	Critical Role	Brigidda (one-shots)	Episode: "Elden Ring One-Shot: O Ye of Little Faith"	
2022–present	Critical Role	Dungeon Master (campaign 3)	Episode: "The Nox Engine", Episodes: "Downfall Parts 1–3"	
2022–present	Critical Role	Dungeon Master (campaign 4)	Main cast	
2023–present	Worlds Beyond Number	Dungeon Master (The Wizard, the Witch, and the Wild One)	Creator-owned podcast	
2023–present	Worlds Beyond Number	XL-ZL (Solari)	Creator-owned podcast	
2023	Candela Obscura: The Circle of Needle & Thread	Sean Finnerty	3 episodes	
2024	Bigger! With Brennan and Izzy	Himself	Improv special	
2024	The Adventure Zone: Abnimals	Sgt. Salamander	Podcast; Episode: "Bunny Heist!"	
2024	99% Invisible	Himself	Podcast; Episode: "Brennan Lee Mulligan"	
2024–2026	Very Important People	Augbert, Greg Excitement, Archimedes	3 episodes	
2025	Exandria Unlimited: Divergence	Dungeon Master	4 episodes	
2025	The Downside with Gianmarco Soresi	Himself	Podcast; Episode: "Minoring in Pangolin with Brennan Lee Mulligan"	
2025	Wildemount Wildlings	Padmund Pondhop	3 episodes	
2025	Last Meals	Himself	Podcast; 1 episode	
2026	Ask Hank Anything	Himself	Episode: "What Animal Should I Avoid Punching?"	
2026	Jeopardy! YouTube Edition	Himself	1 episode	
2026	Monét Talks	Himself	Podcast; Episode: "Brennan Lee Mulligan Talks about Being the Top 1%"	
2026	Dig: The Podcast †	Himself	Podcast host; 10 episodes	

=== Video games ===
Year	Title	Role	Ref.
2025	Date Everything!	Parker Bradley (voice)	
