= Mark Barrowcliffe =

British author and journalist

- Born: 14 July 1964 (age 62); Coventry, United Kingdom
- Education: University of Sussex
- Occupations: Journalist, novelist
- Writing career
- Pen name: M.D. Lachlan
- Language: English
- Period: late 1990s–present
- Genres: Fantasy, nonfiction, journalism
- Notable works: Girlfriend 44; Lucky Dog; The Wolfsangel Series

Mark Barrowcliffe (born 14 July 1964), also known as M.D. Lachlan and Mark Alder, is an English writer.

== Career ==
Barrowcliffe wrote under the pseudonym "M.D. Lachlan" for the Wolfsangel series, which began with Wolfsangel in 2010 and continued to Lord of Slaughter in 2012. A fourth novel in the series, "Valkyrie's Song", is in progress. He was drawn to fantasy after penning The Elfish Gene.

In 2013, Barrowcliffe began a new series, 'The Banners of Blood', under another pseudonym "Mark Alder", with the first book titled Son of the Morning.

== Early life ==
He was born in Coventry and studied at the University of Sussex. After graduating, Barrowcliffe worked as a journalist before penning his first novel, Girlfriend 44. He then made a name for himself writing "lad lit". He currently lives and writes in Brighton, East Sussex, and South Cambridgeshire with his son, James, and daughter, Tabitha.

Barrowcliffe felt that, as he was growing up, he kept his distance from girls and "cool kids", and he turned his attention to the role-playing game Dungeons & Dragons. His experiences as a child are detailed in his memoir, The Elfish Gene.

== Bibliography ==
=== The Wolfsangel series ===
- Wolfsangel (2010, as M.D. Lachlan)
- Fenrir (2011, as M.D. Lachlan)
- Lord of Slaughter (2012, as M.D. Lachlan)
- Valkyrie's Song (2015, as M.D. Lachlan)
- The Night Lies Bleeding (2018, as M.D. Lachlan)

=== The Banners of Blood series ===
- Son of the Morning (2014, as Mark Alder)
- Son of the Night (2017, as Mark Alder)

=== Stand-alone works ===
- Girlfriend 44 (2000)
- Infidelity for First-Time Fathers (2002)
- Lucky Dog (2004)
- The Elfish Gene (2007)
- Mr. Wrong (2008)
- Celestial (2022, as M.D. Lachlan)

== Adaptations of his works ==
Ron Howard has secured the film rights for Barrowcliffe's novel Girlfriend 44, and Infidelity for First-Time Fathers is in development with 2929 Entertainment.
