= Gabriel Rodríguez =

Gabriel Rodríguez may refer to:

- Gabriel Rodríguez Aguiló (born 1973), Puerto Rican politician
- Gabriel Rodríguez (Argentine footballer) (born 1989), footballer currently playing for Audax Italiano of the Primera División in Chile
- Gabriel Rodríguez (canoeist) (born 1979), Venezuelan sprint canoer
- Gabriel Rodrigues dos Santos (born 1981), Brazilian footballer
- Gabriel Rodriguez (artist) (born 1976), Chilean comic book artist
- Gabriel Rodriguez (chef), Mexican chef
- Gabriel 'G-Rod' Rodriguez, actor
