= Strong Female Protagonist =

American superhero webcomic

- Cover image of issue 1
- Author(s): Brennan Lee Mulligan; Lee Knox Ostertag
- Website: strongfemaleprotagonist.com
- Current status/schedule: Hiatus
- Genre: Superhero comedy/action/drama

Strong Female Protagonist is a dramatic superhero webcomic series written by Brennan Lee Mulligan and drawn by Lee Knox Ostertag, published online from 2012 to 2018.

== Premise ==
Strong Female Protagonist follows Alison Green, the titular protagonist, a super-strong ex-superhero who retired from her teenage role of "Mega Girl". Now 21, she is a college student who works for justice by attending protests and volunteering. Her celebrity status makes it hard to get close to classmates, while other superheroes tend to treat her poorly, and her superhero past continues to affect her life.

Strong Female Protagonist describes itself as "the adventures of a young middle-class American with super-strength, invincibility and a crippling sense of social injustice".

== Reception ==
Io9 named Strong Female Protagonist one of "the best new and short webcomics of 2012". In a review, Io9 writer Lauren Davis said the comic "examines the roles of superhumans in a world that remains plagued by more mundane perils: social injustice, government intrusion into reproductive rights, fires not set by supervillains" and that it asks "intriguing questions about the relationship between superheroes and real-world problems". Davis also said that "Ostertag's art, which improves immensely toward the end of the first issue, handily portrays a world so ordinary that it is truly spectacular when someone shows off even the most minor of super powers."

In a review for ComicsAlliance, Chris Sims also praised the comic's comedy, characters, and fights. Sims wrote that "the idea of someone with superpowers questioning whether they're making a real difference or just making things worse by throwing bad guys through buildings" isn't new to the genre, but said that Strong Female Protagonist "takes a look at all of that without ever seeming like it's taking a cynical shot at superheroes." Sims felt that Mulligan and Ostertag present Green as "immediately likable. She reads like a fully-formed person right from the start", while her ex-teammates were not demonized "for not devoting themselves to solving The Real Problems", but vary from decent people to jerks. Sims, like Davis, agreed that Ostertag's art improves over the issues, saying, "It doesn't start out bad by any stretch of the imagination -- the expressive faces are there right from the first page -- but seeing how the lines smooth out and the action scenes become more fluid and dynamic as the comic goes on is really neat."

Strong Female Protagonist was named "Favorite Webcomic — Serial" in the 2015 Autostraddle Comic and Sequential Art Awards. Mey Rude noted that it explores "the implications of superpowers on morality, relationships and young adulthood, all while having one of the best and most complicated super-powered women in all of comics."

== Publication ==
Strong Female Protagonist began to be released in 2012.

The comic was collected in a book published by Top Shelf Productions in November 2014, after a Kickstarter campaign intended to raise $8,000 raised over $60,000 instead. This was the first book which collected chapters 1 to 4.

In April 2017, another Kickstarter campaign was made for a second book, this time raising over $70,000. Book two collected chapters 5 and 6. The remaining two chapters have not been collected.

In 2018, the comic went on hiatus, in part due to both creators having other work.
