= What Happened to Mr. Forster? =

1981 book by Gary W. Bargar

- Author: Gary W. Bargar
- Language: English
- Genre: Novel
- Publisher: Houghton Mifflin
- Publication date: September 1981
- Publication place: United States
- Media type: Print (Hardback & Paperback)
- Pages: 169 pp (hardback edition)
- ISBN: 0-395-31021-0 (hardback edition)
- OCLC: 7206313
- LC Class: PZ7.B25037 Wh

What Happened to Mr. Forster? is a 1981 novel by Gary W. Bargar. It is a story of a young boy's first encounter with the complexities of the adult world.

The ALAN Review has recommended the novel be taught at the middle-school level. 'It is appropriate for a young audience as it pertains to a sixth-grade class and deals with issues that students this age are beginning to discover and rationalize. Bargar shows how homosexuality is perceived as immoral and the ultimate sin by a predominately conservative Christian community. At the same time, he emphasizes the fact that homosexuals are people who have feelings, emotions, and feel love just as anyone else.' The Safe Schools Coalition has also recommended the book for Elementary Libraries & Classrooms.

== Plot summary ==
Louis Lamb is a twelve-year-old boy who lives in Kansas City, Missouri in 1958. A new homosexual teacher, Jack Forster, takes an interest in Louis, an attractive but vulnerable child who likes playing with china animals rather than joining in the ball games the other boys love. He gives Louis one-on-one softball coaching and helps him develop his writing talent.

Parents in the community, however, are suspicious of the teacher who lives with another man. Forster doesn't do anything in any way inappropriate with the boy, just occasionally squeezing his shoulder, but they do spend quite a lot of time together. Eventually, some of the children's parents start a witch-hunt against Forster, assuming that, because he is gay, his interest in Louis must be sexual. He is fired, and effectively blacklisted. Louis is devastated by losing his favourite teacher, a man who improved the boy's self esteem and developed his latent talents. Louis does not understand, nor does he feel it fair that Mr. Forster, who is such a good teacher and brings out the best in him, has been fired.

Louis goes round to Mr. Forster's house to talk to him. Forster immediately rings Louis' Aunt Zona and asks her to come and collect him. In the meantime he sits and talks with Louis. Mr. Forster explains to him that life isn't always fair and that sometimes people just don't understand how other people love each other. On the way home, Aunt Zona says "I think your Mr. Forster is really good at heart. Maybe the Lord will forgive him for being that way."

On the last page of the novel, when the children have been asked by their new teacher to write a thought for the day, Louis knew what to do: 'Then I took out my pen, but not to write down the Thought for the Day. I wrote about Mr. Forster.'
