= Nick Burd =

American writer (born 1980)

- Born: April 17, 1980 (age 46)
- Education: University of Iowa; The New School (MFA)
- Occupation: Novelist
- Writing career
- Subjects: Young Adult, Gay
- Notable work: The Vast Fields of Ordinary
- Notable awards: Stonewall Book Award, 2010
- Website: cargocollective.com/nickburd

Nick Burd (born April 17, 1980) is an American novelist.

== Career ==
Nick Burd attended the University of Iowa and received his MFA from The New School.

In 2009, Burd published his first novel, The Vast Fields of Ordinary, which received many positive reviews. The Vast Fields of Ordinary won the American Library Association's Stonewall Book Award in the Children's and Young Adult Literature category. The novel was also a finalist for a Lambda Literary Award for LGBT Children's/Young Adult literature. The New York Times listed The Vast Fields of Ordinary as one of the most notable books of 2009. The novel also received a positive review from The New York Times. Publishers Weekly called The Vast Fields of Ordinary "deceptively quiet" and "fresh" and said that Burd was "an author to watch."

Burd was also listed by Out as one of its "OUT 100," a list of 100 people who made important contributions to LGBTQ culture and politics in 2009.

He is working on his second novel.

Since writing The Vast Fields of Ordinary, Burd has worked in the entertainment industry as a creative director, winning two Clio Awards and a Shorty Award for his work on the digital campaigns for BoJack Horseman and Daredevil.

== Bibliography ==
External videos
- Burd speaks as part of a panel on Diversity in Children's and Young Adult Publishing at the 2010 Harlem Book Fair, July 17, 2010, C-SPAN

- The Vast Fields of Ordinary (2009)
