= Widdershins (comic) =

Webcomic by Kate Ashwin

- Cover of Widdershins Volume 9
- Author: Kate Ashwin
- Website: widdershinscomic.com
- Current status/schedule: Finished
- Launch date: 17 October 2011
- End date: 19 August 2026

Widdershins is a fantasy webcomic drawn by Kate Ashwin. Debuting in 2011, it has eleven complete stories and ended in 2026.

== Synopsis ==
Widdershins is set in the eponymous fictional magical city of Widdershins in West Yorkshire, England, during the mid-1830s. While technology develops apace, it does so with the benefit (and hazards) of magic.

The story begins with (former) student wizard and stage magician Sidney Malik, who – being cursed with involuntarily stealing small objects – becomes attached to a bracelet that by custom declares him the King of Thieves. This brings him to the notice of Harriet "Harry" Barber, professional bounty hunter and pipe smoker, and leads them two off onto further adventure

In the second story, two vagrants are pressed to work for the city's bureaucracy to deal with "malforms," the destructive results of summoning spells gone awry. Their comical attempts to deal with the malforms are connected to the agenda of their employer, a local politician who is seeking to put greater restrictions on magic. Other storylines include an ex-soldier making a deal with a spirit of Envy, and a supernatural tale of cake-making.

Ashwin said in an interview in 2015 that she started work on Widdershins around 2011, saying that "there weren't quite enough fun, light-hearted adventure comics out there," and writes each book to be a complete story "since I like resolution".

== Reception ==
Widdershins, Volume 7- Curtain Call, won the British Fantasy Award for Best Comic/Graphic Novel in 2019.

In a review for io9, Lauren Davis said that "Ashwin strikes a comedic tone with her comic that might be too light for some, but her worldbuilding is growing steadily more intriguing and her characters are fun to spend time with". Steve Morris, reviewing Widdershins for ComicsAlliance, described it as "a uniquely English sort of series, inspired as much by the Great British Bake Off as by classic novels gone by."

== Author ==
Kate Ashwin lives in West Yorkshire and is married. Her first comic was Darken, a D&D-based comic with a main cast of antiheroes. In addition to Widdershins, which she works full time on, Kate Ashwin has also contributed comics to printed collections of fairy tales and to Chemistry World. She has also written a story for Dark Horse Presents, and contributed artwork to a weekly comic for kids called The Phoenix.
