= The Witch Boy trilogy =

Graphic novel trilogy Lee Knox Ostertag

- The Witch Boy (October 31, 2017); The Hidden Witch (October 30, 2018); The Midwinter Witch (November 5, 2019)
- Author: Lee Knox Ostertag
- Illustrator: Lee Knox Ostertag
- Genre: Fantasy
- Publisher: Graphix
- No. of books: 3

The Witch Boy is a graphic novel fantasy trilogy by Lee Knox Ostertag. The series consists of The Witch Boy, The Hidden Witch, and The Midwinter Witch, published by Graphix from 2017 to 2019. The series follows Aster, a boy who violates his society’s gender norms to practice witchcraft.

== Plot ==
=== The Witch Boy ===
Aster is a young boy in a society where men have the ability to shapeshift while women can perform witchcraft. He desires to be a witch instead of a shapeshifter, however his parents and community refuse, telling him of a great-uncle that attempted to learn witchcraft with disastrous results. After a mysterious beast begins abducting boys in Aster's community, he and his new friend Charlie, a girl from outside the community without magic abilities, resolve to use witchcraft to save them.

=== The Hidden Witch ===
Aster, now openly practicing witchcraft, is tasked by his grandmother to help her brother Mikasi. Meanwhile, Charlie attempts to befriend Ariel, a new girl at her school and a foster child, who turns out to be a witch.

=== The Midwinter Witch ===
Aster participates in a witchcraft competition at the local Midwinter Festival, but his parents fear that his extended family will not accept him. Ariel, now living with Aster's family, is confronted with a woman who claims to be related to her.

== Reception ==
Kirkus Reviews gave starred reviews to the first two books, and additionally positively reviewed The Midwinter Witch, praising the art and worldbuilding and remarking on the diverse cast, with Aster, Charlie, and Ariel being biracial, Black, and Latina respectively, and Charlie having two fathers. For The Hidden Witch, the reviewer also praised the complex depiction of bullying, with Ariel both bullying and being bullied.

School Library Journal gave The Witch Boy a starred review and included it on a list of the Top 10 Graphic Novels of 2018, describing it as a "modern-day fairy tale" about gender roles while praising the book as an "exciting adventure story" that is sweet and exciting, lauding the artwork as rich, but criticizing the storytelling for being "a bit rushed in the end." The publication also reviewed the sequels, with Ashleigh Williams noting that The Hidden Witch continues the story with the two protagonists "helping another magical girl", praising it for adapting the setting in a skillful way while "tackling topics such as friendship, jealousy, bullying, and identity" and for the bold and colorful artwork, stating that the book's "coming-of-age messages will resonate with middle graders." Williams also reviewed The Midwinter Witch, for the same publication, saying that while this book is "more subdued" than previous parts of the series and it is a strong end to the series, and praised the artwork for having a "folksy palette of forest greens and browns."

Jen Linnan of Publisher Weekly, in reviewing the first book, stated that the "family-centered narrative is warm and wholesome" while criticizing Aster's internal conflict as predictable and too similar to existing stories about gender non-conformance.

The Witch Boy won the 2018 Cybils Award for Graphic Novel, with The Hidden Witch being a finalist for the 2019 edition of the award. The Witch Boy also won the 2018 Prism Award for Best Comic from a Mainstream Publisher. Additionally, The Witch Boy was included in the list of Great Graphic Novels for Teens for 2018 by the Young Adult Library Services Association, a division of the American Library Association, and the other two books in the series in similar lists for 2019 and 2020.

== Film adaption ==
In 2021, Netflix announced it would be creating an animated musical film based on The Witch Boy, to be directed by Minkyu Lee, director of Adam and Dog, and with music from HAIM. However, in August 2025, Comics Beat said that the official status of the film "remains unknown."

== See also ==
Other graphic novels by Lee Knox Ostertag:

- The Girl from the Sea
- The Deep Dark
