= The Vast Fields of Ordinary =

2009 young adult gay novel by Nick Burd

- Cover illustration of the novel The Vast Fields of Ordinary by Nick Burd
- Author: Nick Burd
- Language: English
- Genre: Young adult novel
- Publisher: Dial Books
- Publication date: 2009
- Publication place: United States
- Media type: Print (hardback & paperback)
- ISBN: 0-8037-3340-2

The Vast Fields of Ordinary is a young adult gay novel by American author Nick Burd first published in 2009. The novel depicts the summer after high school graduation for a closeted suburban teenage boy, his openly lesbian new best friend, and the two boys he is interested in dating (one a Latino football star, the other a drug dealer). The Vast Fields of Ordinary is Burd's debut novel.

The book won the American Library Association's Stonewall Book Award in the Children's and Young Adult Literature category, and was a Lambda Literary Award finalist for LGBT Children's/Young Adult literature. Booklist added the novel to its Rainbow List 2010, a bibliography of young adult books which include significant gay, lesbian, bisexual, transgender, or questioning content. The New York Times listed it as one of the most notable books of 2009.

On the basis of this novel, Out named author Nick Burd to the "OUT 100," a list of 100 people who made important contributions to LGBTQ culture and politics in 2009.

== Plot synopsis ==
The novel is told in the first person singular. All the narrative occurs in the present. The title comes from a line in the novel in which a young girl misquotes a line from an alternative rock band. The fictional band, Vas Deferens, is the favorite band of the main character. One of their songs is used in a TV commercial, and the girl misquotes the lyrics as "the vast fields of ordinary." The novel is prefaced with a quote from the poet and playwright E. E. Cummings: "To be nobody but yourself in a world which is doing its best day and night to make you like everybody else means to fight the hardest battle which any human being can fight and never stop fighting." The quote is taken from the essay "A Poet's Advice to Students," which appeared in the book E. E. Cummings, A Miscellany.

Dade Hamilton is 18 years old and trying to enjoy the summer after his high school graduation. He has a part-time job at Food World, a local supermarket. Dade has come out gay to himself, but not anyone else. His father, Ned, sells luxury automobiles and his mother, Peggy, is an art teacher at a local Roman Catholic parochial school. They live in Cedarville, a fictional city in Iowa. For several years, Peggy has struggled with depression, and is taking a large number of antidepressants. She is increasingly alienated from her upper middle class lifestyle and family. Ned, too, is alienated from his family, and has begun taking poetry classes at a local community college. Dade is a loner whose only friend is Pablo Soto, a Mexican American who is Cedarville high school's star quarterback for the football team. Since they were 16 years old, Pablo and Dade have been having sex. But Pablo considers himself heterosexual, and has a girlfriend, Judy Lockhart. Pablo and Dade are friends, but Pablo doesn't spend much time with Dade and appears to only see him as a provider of passive anal sex.

The novel opens in the last days of high school, with Dade telling Pablo that he loves him. Pablo slaps him hard across the face until Dade retracts the statement. Dade is increasingly harassed at high school by jocks and by Judy Lockhart, all of whom think he's gay. A short time later, Ned tells Dade that he is having an affair with a woman he met at his poetry class. As the school year ends, Dade attends a party hosted by the pretty Jessica Montana and her awkward, less-pretty twin sister Francesca (whom everyone belittles by calling "Fessica"). Fessica attempts to seduce Dade, and Dade leaves the party. Outside, Dade meets Alex Kincaid, a 20-year-old marijuana drug dealer. It is love at first sight for Dade. Dade discovers Alex's name and where he works. He meets Alex, and under the pretense of securing some marijuana, the two teens take a trip into the countryside that evening to obtain drugs from a man named Dingo. Dade meets Dingo, an older man who grows marijuana, and members of Dingo's rock band (all of whom appear to be slackers and drug users). Dade finally feels like he is accepted by a group of 'cool' people.

A few days later, Dade meets Lucy at a neighbor's barbecue party. Lucy is a 17-year-old lesbian from California. She came out to her parents, who were upset with their daughter's sexual orientation. So they sent her to Cedarville to live for the summer. Where Dade is introverted, socially awkward, and closeted, Lucy is socially outgoing, confident, and cool. They become close friends as June turns into July. Pablo seeks out Dade for more sex, but Dade turns him down. Dade expresses that he wants a real relationship with Pablo, something Pablo is unwilling to give. In late July, Lucy and Dade use fake I.D.s to get into Cherry's, a gay bar. Dade sees Pablo there, but Pablo and Dade argue briefly and Dade leaves. After several weeks, Dade finally hears from Alex, who invites him to a party at Dingo's. They attend, and both Alex and Dade shave their heads on a whim. Later that night, Alex nonchalantly reveals he is gay; he is unconditionally accepted by Dingo and his friends. Alex and Dade kiss and Alex takes Dade home.

A few nights later, Alex takes Dade to his grandfather's grave where he learns more of Dade's history. This gives them a deeper connection, and they have sex on top of his grave, under the night sky. Alex and Dade continue to bond after that evening, while Pablo continues to harass Dade—seeking both sex and companionship, and verbally gay bashing him when he does not answer his text messages or cell phone calls.

After a night of binge drinking by the family swimming pool, Dade has a dream (or possibly a hallucination) where he sees Jenny Moore, a nine-year-old girl whose disappearance has dominated the local television and radio news for weeks. Dade tells Lucy, who says she believes that Dade really saw Jenny despite the fact that he was drunk, and they try to unravel the meaning of Dade's dream. Dade also tells his parents he is gay. His father is uncertain what this means, but his mother accepts it. Alex takes Dade, Lucy, and Alex's African American co-worker Jay to a large party hosted by Bert McGraw, a homophobe who is a friend of Pablo's. The presence of Alex, Lucy, and Jay cause Dade to be somewhat accepted by the other cool teens and jocks. Dade meets Pablo and they argue, which leads Pablo to become jealous of Alex.

Dade's parents reveal that they will be taking a three-week trip to Europe to try to repair their marriage. Pablo becomes increasingly desperate to be with Dade, even exposing his genitals to him at work. When Dade rejects him, Pablo spits on him. Dade introduces Alex to his parents at an awkward barbecue before they leave for Europe. While his parents are gone, Alex stays with Dade. Alex, Jay, Lucy, and Dade spend much of their time drinking alcohol to excess, and Dade worries that Alex's late-night lifestyle is not very similar to his own. Alex convinces Dade to have a large party at the house. Dade becomes very drunk. He wakes at 5 A.M. to learns from the television news that Jenny Moore has been found. He sleeps again, and wakes to find Pablo in his room. Pablo breaks down and cries, but refuses to talk about his feelings with Dade. A terrible accident brings the novel to a sudden close and forces Dade to end his wonderful summer.

A subplot in the novel involves the disappearance of nine-year-old Jenny Moore. The girl's disappearance creates tension for Peggy, Dade, Alex, and others. At times, the characters' concern for Jenny allows them to voice their own inner feelings to themselves and to others.

The novel depicts homosexual encounters (one review called these descriptions PG-13), marijuana smoking, underage consumption of alcohol, and hangovers. Most of the teenagers in the novel smoke cigarettes constantly.

== Critical reception ==
The novel was widely reviewed, and received many positive comments. The New York Times found the novel "fascinating and dreamy...filled with characters who are extraordinary to a degree that the reader wants to know more, even about the most minor ones." The review praised Burd's use of language and metaphor, and called the work "the best kind of first novel—it's packed with insights that might have been carried around for years, just waiting to come out." Michael Cart, reviewer at Booklist, was highly laudatory: "...Burd is a terrific writer with a special gift for creating teenage characters who are vital, plausible, and always engaging (even when they're being mean and menacing). His take on the complications in Dade's life is sophisticated and thoughtful, especially on the ambiguities of that 'relationship' with Pablo, while his limning of the growing friendship with Alex is deeply satisfying, never striking a discordant emotional note." A review in The Plain Dealer found that Burd "writes incisively about the anxiety of severing relationships and fleeing a dead-end town, a reality playing out daily across the Midwest." The School Library Journal listed The Vast Fields of Ordinary as one of 11 novels for LGBTQ teens published in 2009 that had strong characters and candid writing, and concluded that it "beg[s] to be invited into a surprising variety of classroom discussions..."

Some reviews of the book were critical however. Booklist, while generally praising the novel, also criticized the work for being a "traditional coming-out-while-coming-of-age story," and found the missing-girl subplot unsatisfying. Both Booklist and The Plain Dealer felt the novel's conclusion was perfunctory.

== Book ban ==
In 2023, the book was banned in Kuna School District, Idaho.

== See also ==
- Gay teen fiction
