= List of Dimension 20 episodes =

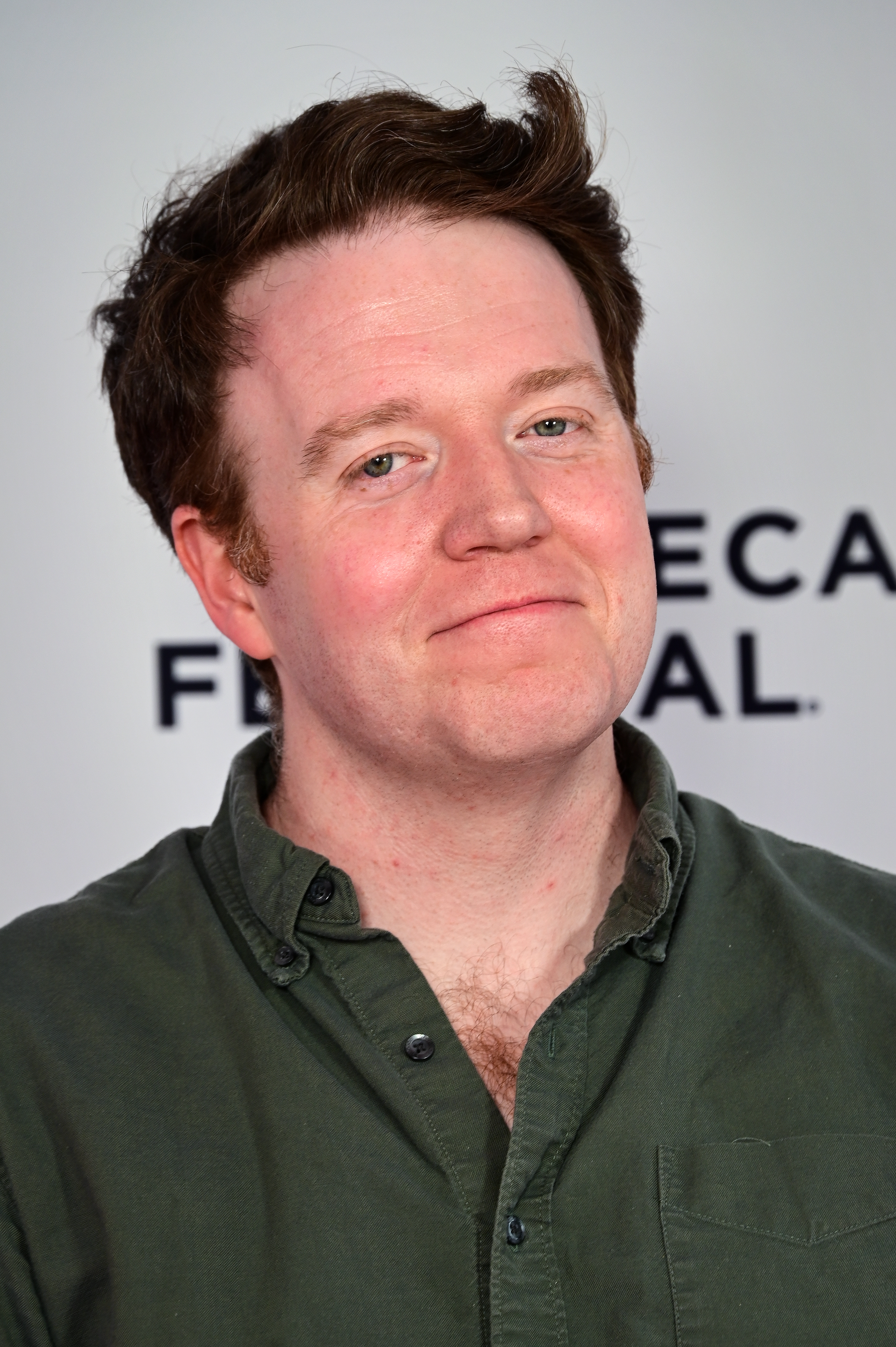
Dimension 20 creator and DM Brennan Lee Mulligan (pictured in 2026)

Dimension 20 is an American actual play tabletop role-playing game show created by Brennan Lee Mulligan for independent streaming service Dropout. It is an anthology series, with each season telling its own isolated story, mostly with a recurring cast of players. The main cast features Mulligan as the DM alongside fellow Dropout cast members Emily Axford, Ally Beardsley, Brian Murphy, Zac Oyama, Siobhan Thompson and Lou Wilson. This cast of players are known as the "Intrepid Heroes", while seasons without this core group in full are called "Side Quests". The latest season will be A Starstruck Odyssey season 2, which will air sometime in 2027.

== Series overview ==
Campaign	Name	Episodes	Originally released		
Campaign	Name	Episodes	First released	Last released	Network
1	Fantasy High	17	September 26, 2018	January 9, 2019	Dropout, YouTube
2	Escape from the Bloodkeep	6	April 30, 2019	June 4, 2019	Dropout, YouTube
3	The Unsleeping City	17	July 9, 2019	October 29, 2019	Dropout, YouTube
4	Fantasy High: Sophomore Year	20	October 16, 2019	April 3, 2020	Dropout, Twitch, YouTube
5	Tiny Heist	6	January 9, 2020	February 13, 2020	Dropout (Note: The premiere episode of every season is also available in full on YouTube.)
6	A Crown of Candy	17	April 8, 2020	August 5, 2020	Dropout
7	Pirates of Leviathan	6	September 16, 2020	October 21, 2020	Dropout
8	The Unsleeping City: Chapter II	18	November 11, 2020	March 10, 2021	Dropout
9	Mice & Murder	10	April 7, 2021	June 9, 2021	Dropout
10	Misfits and Magic	4	June 30, 2021	July 21, 2021	Dropout
11	The Seven	10	August 18, 2021	October 20, 2021	Dropout
12	Shriek Week	4	November 10, 2021	December 1, 2021	Dropout
13	A Starstruck Odyssey	18	January 12, 2022	May 11, 2022	Dropout, YouTube
14	Coffin Run	6	June 8, 2022	July 13, 2022	Dropout
15	A Court of Fey & Flowers	10	August 3, 2022	October 5, 2022	Dropout
16	Neverafter	20	November 30, 2022	April 12, 2023	Dropout
17	The Ravening War	6	May 10, 2023	June 14, 2023	Dropout
18	Dungeons and Drag Queens	4	June 28, 2023	July 19, 2023	Dropout
19	Mentopolis	6	August 9, 2023	September 13, 2023	Dropout
20	Burrow's End	10	October 4, 2023	December 6, 2023	Dropout
21	Fantasy High: Junior Year	20	January 10, 2024	May 22, 2024	Dropout
22	Never Stop Blowing Up	10	June 26, 2024	August 28, 2024	Dropout
23	Misfits and Magic: Season 2	11	September 25, 2024	December 4, 2024	Dropout
24	Dungeons and Drag Queens Season 2	6	January 8, 2025	February 12, 2025	Dropout
25	Titan Takedown	4	April 2, 2025	April 23, 2025	Dropout
26	Cloudward, Ho!	20	June 4, 2025	October 22, 2025	Dropout
27	Gladlands	6	January 7, 2026	February 11, 2026	Dropout
28	City Council of Darkness	14	April 8, 2026	July 8, 2026	Dropout
29	Toylight	6	September 16, 2026	October 21, 2026	Dropout
30	A Starstruck Odyssey Season 2	TBA	2027	2027	Dropout
Specials	Specials	17	June 24, 2019	April 1, 2026	Dropout

== Episodes ==
=== Fantasy High ===
No. overall	No. in season	Title	Original release date
1	1	"The Beginning Begins"	September 26, 2018
2	2	"Clash of the Corn Cuties"	September 26, 2018
3	3	"After the Afterlife"	October 3, 2018
4	4	"Rumble Road"	October 10, 2018
5	5	"The Pixie and the Palimpsest"	October 17, 2018
6	6	"Brawl at the Black Pit"	October 24, 2018
7	7	"Graveyard of Good and Evil"	October 31, 2018
8	8	"Havoc on the Half-Pipe"	November 7, 2018
9	9	"Dishing with a Demon"	November 14, 2018
10	10	"Battle of the Bloodrush Brethren"	November 21, 2018
11	11	"Cool Kids, Cold Case"	November 28, 2018
12	12	"The Sisterly Showdown"	December 5, 2018
13	13	"First Kisses and Last Words"	December 12, 2018
14	14	"Arcade Ambush"	December 19, 2018
15	15	"Family in Flames"	December 26, 2018
16	16	"Prompocalypse"	January 2, 2019
17	17	"Prompocalypse Part 2"	January 9, 2019

=== Escape from the Bloodkeep ===
No. overall	No. in season	Title	Original release date
18	1	"Welcome to the Dark Side"	April 30, 2019
19	2	"Volcano of Violence"	May 7, 2019
20	3	"The Caged Elf and the Crown"	May 14, 2019
21	4	"Airship Ambush"	May 21, 2019
22	5	"Bloodlines and Lifelines"	May 28, 2019
23	6	"The Tomb of Ultimate Evil"	June 4, 2019

=== The Unsleeping City ===
No. overall	No. in season	Title	Original release date
24	1	"Start Spreading the News"	July 9, 2019
25	2	"Mutant Santa Melee"	July 16, 2019
26	3	"Pigeon Plus Ones"	July 23, 2019
27	4	"Scramble in the Sewers"	July 30, 2019
28	5	"A New York Wedding"	August 6, 2019
29	6	"The War of Bugs and Rats"	August 13, 2019
30	7	"We Need to Talk About Pete"	August 20, 2019
31	8	"Subway Skirmish"	August 27, 2019
32	9	"Borough of Dreams"	September 3, 2019
33	10	"Panic at the Art Show"	September 10, 2019
34	11	"Home for the Holidays"	September 17, 2019
35	12	"Broadway Brawl"	September 24, 2019
36	13	"Faeries and Feces"	October 1, 2019
37	14	"Showdown at the Stock Exchange"	October 8, 2019
38	15	"Hall of Heroes"	October 15, 2019
39	16	"Times Squaremageddon"	October 22, 2019
40	17	"Times Squaremageddon Pt. 2"	October 29, 2019

=== Fantasy High: Sophomore Year ===
No. overall	No. in season	Title	Original release date
41	1	"Sophomores Start"	October 16, 2019
42	2	"Mirror Madness"	October 23, 2019
43	3	"Havoc at the Hotel Cavalier"	October 30, 2019
44	4	"Heartache on the Celestine Sea"	November 6, 2019
45	5	"Leviathan Rock City"	November 13, 2019
46	6	"Pirate Brawl"	November 20, 2019
47	7	"The Friendship Section"	December 4, 2019
48	8	"The Row and the Ruction"	December 11, 2019
49	9	"Fallinel"	December 18, 2019
50	10	"The Dangerous Mind of Aelwyn Abernant"	January 15, 2020
51	11	"Revelations & Revivifications"	January 22, 2020
52	12	"Crustaceans & Crushes"	January 29, 2020
53	13	"Hellbound"	February 5, 2020
54	14	"Daddies & Demons"	February 12, 2020
55	15	"Blast from the Passed"	February 19, 2020
56	16	"My Green Heaven"	February 26, 2020
57	17	"The Forest of the Nightmare King"	March 4, 2020
58	18	"Fearful Symmetry"	March 11, 2020
59	19	"Spring Break! I Believe in You! (Part 1)"	April 1, 2020
60	20	"Spring Break! I Believe in You! (Part 2)"	April 3, 2020

=== Tiny Heist ===
No. overall	No. in season	Title	Original release date
61	1	"Big Little Crimes"	January 9, 2020
62	2	"Chicanery at Shoeby's Casino"	January 16, 2020
63	3	"Scheming and Scoring Fairy Dust"	January 23, 2020
64	4	"Breaking and Entering"	January 30, 2020
65	5	"Fighting with Fire"	February 6, 2020
66	6	"The Great Chase"	February 13, 2020

=== A Crown of Candy ===
No. overall	No. in season	Title	Original release date
67	1	"There is Strength in Sweetness"	April 8, 2020
68	2	"Ambush on the Sucrosi Road"	April 15, 2020
69	3	"Keep Sharp"	April 22, 2020
70	4	"The Grand Tournament"	April 29, 2020
71	5	"Lapin's Big Day"	May 6, 2020
72	6	"Chaos in the Cathedral"	May 13, 2020
73	7	"Escape from the Bulb Creeps"	May 20, 2020
74	8	"Deep Bleu Sea"	May 27, 2020
75	9	"Safe Harbor"	June 10, 2020
76	10	"Blood & Bread"	June 17, 2020
77	11	"At the Mountains of Sweetness"	June 24, 2020
78	12	"Rescue at Buzzybrook"	July 1, 2020
79	13	"Family Ties"	July 8, 2020
80	14	"Encounter in the Ice Cream Temple"	July 15, 2020
81	15	"The Two Balls"	July 22, 2020
82	16	"For Candia! (Part 1)"	July 29, 2020
83	17	"For Candia! (Part 2)"	August 5, 2020

=== Pirates of Leviathan ===
No. overall	No. in season	Title	Original release date
84	1	"A Heaping Helping of Trouble"	September 16, 2020
85	2	"The Daughter of Storms"	September 23, 2020
86	3	"Into the Sternwood"	September 30, 2020
87	4	"I'm Worth This"	October 7, 2020
88	5	"Scramble to the Ramble"	October 14, 2020
89	6	"The Horizon Beyond the Squall"	October 21, 2020

=== The Unsleeping City: Chapter II ===
No. overall	No. in season	Title	Original release date
90	1	"The Fall of New York"	November 11, 2020
91	2	"Heaven & Hell on Earth"	November 18, 2020
92	3	"The Mystery of the Haunted Subway"	November 25, 2020
93	4	"We Need to Talk About Cody"	December 2, 2020
94	5	"Trouble at the Tunnel"	December 9, 2020
95	6	"Collaborators"	December 16, 2020
96	7	"Parade of Peril"	December 23, 2020
97	8	"Feasts & Families"	December 30, 2020
98	9	"Fight at the Museum"	January 6, 2021
99	10	"Nulla Dies Umquam Memori Vos Eximet Aevo"	January 13, 2021
100	11	"Let's Get Tiny"	January 20, 2021
101	12	"The Battle of the Hot Dog Cart"	January 27, 2021
102	13	"Of Rats & Dragons"	February 3, 2021
103	14	"History Checks and Lost Dex"	February 10, 2021
104	15	"For the Hoard!"	February 17, 2021
105	16	"Treachery at Gramercy"	February 24, 2021
106	17	"Two Sides of the Same Coin (Part 1)"	March 3, 2021
107	18	"Two Sides of the Same Coin (Part 2)"	March 10, 2021

=== Mice & Murder ===
No. overall	No. in season	Title	Original release date
108	1	"It Was a Dark and Stormy Night"	April 7, 2021
109	2	"A Scandal in Britannia"	April 14, 2021
110	3	"A Time for Clues"	April 21, 2021
111	4	"The Stabber of the Evening"	April 28, 2021
112	5	"The Eye of the Storm"	May 5, 2021
113	6	"Busted"	May 12, 2021
114	7	"I've Been Here the Whole Time"	May 19, 2021
115	8	"Outfoxed"	May 26, 2021
116	9	"The Belly of the Beast"	June 2, 2021
117	10	"Unfinished Business"	June 9, 2021

=== Misfits and Magic ===
No. overall	No. in season	Title	Original release date
118	1	"The Chosen Ones"	June 30, 2021
119	2	"Class Conflict"	July 7, 2021
120	3	"Family on Six"	July 14, 2021
121	4	"We're the Heroes"	July 21, 2021

=== The Seven ===
No. overall	No. in season	Title	Original release date
122	1	"Party of Seven"	August 18, 2021
123	2	"In or Out"	August 25, 2021
124	3	"Big City Connections"	September 1, 2021
125	4	"Stone Temple Pile-Up"	September 8, 2021
126	5	"Reflections"	September 15, 2021
127	6	"Belles of the Baronies"	September 22, 2021
128	7	"Bloppelganger Blitz"	September 29, 2021
129	8	"And Another Thing"	October 6, 2021
130	9	"Time & Space"	October 13, 2021
131	10	"I Fucking Love You"	October 20, 2021

=== Shriek Week ===
No. overall	No. in season	Title	Original release date
132	1	"The Club Fair"	November 10, 2021
133	2	"Quandary on the Quad"	November 17, 2021
134	3	"Parents' Weekend"	November 24, 2021
135	4	"Van Helsing's Party"	December 1, 2021

=== A Starstruck Odyssey ===
No. overall	No. in season	Title	Original release date
136	1	"Welcome to the Spacin' Life, Buddy"	January 12, 2022
137	2	"Rolling Up the Hill"	January 19, 2022
138	3	"Wrecked on Rec 97"	January 26, 2022
139	4	"Every Day is Our Wurst Day"	February 2, 2022
140	5	"All in the Hot Exit"	February 9, 2022
141	6	"On the Run in the Martini Nebula"	February 16, 2022
142	7	"Dying Tomorrow, It's a Pleasure"	February 23, 2022
143	8	"Wallops at Swallop's"	March 2, 2022
144	9	"Baustin Skiffy Limits"	March 9, 2022
145	10	"It's a Griivarr World After All"	March 16, 2022
146	11	"Flee From Fantanimalland"	March 23, 2022
147	12	"Go Big or Go Home"	March 30, 2022
148	13	"Battle of the Brands"	April 6, 2022
149	14	"The House Always Wins"	April 13, 2022
150	15	"Face to Face"	April 20, 2022
151	16	"Jailbreak!"	April 27, 2022
152	17	"The Luckless, the Abandoned, and the Forsaked (Part 1)"	May 4, 2022
153	18	"The Luckless, the Abandoned, and the Forsaked (Part 2)"	May 11, 2022

=== Coffin Run ===
No. overall	No. in season	Title	Original release date
154	1	"Down for the Count"	June 8, 2022
155	2	"Attacks on the Tracks"	June 15, 2022
156	3	"Let's Kill Everybody"	June 22, 2022
157	4	"Waylaid by Werewolves"	June 29, 2022
158	5	"Drac's Moved-In Castle"	July 6, 2022
159	6	"Feed the Beast"	July 13, 2022

=== A Court of Fey & Flowers ===
No. overall	No. in season	Title	Original release date
160	1	"A Bloom to Remember"	August 3, 2022
161	2	"The Great Hart Hunt"	August 10, 2022
162	3	"Duel on the Southern Lawn"	August 17, 2022
163	4	"Seaside Teatime"	August 24, 2022
164	5	"Through the Hedge Maze"	August 31, 2022
165	6	"Of One Mind"	September 7, 2022
166	7	"The Masquerade Ball"	September 14, 2022
167	8	"The Rule of Sneakery"	September 21, 2022
168	9	"Theater of War"	September 28, 2022
169	10	"You Will Never Know a Lonely Day Again"	October 5, 2022

=== Neverafter ===
No. overall	No. in season	Title	Original release date
170	1	"The Times of Shadow"	November 30, 2022
171	2	"Mirror, Mirror"	December 7, 2022
172	3	"No Place For a Prince or Princess"	December 14, 2022
173	4	"Once Upon a Time"	December 21, 2022
174	5	"Down Came the Rain"	December 28, 2022
175	6	"The Curdled Web"	January 4, 2023
176	7	"Trouble in Tuffeton"	January 11, 2023
177	8	"The Lines Between"	January 18, 2023
178	9	"Origins"	January 25, 2023
179	10	"The Baron of Bricks"	February 1, 2023
180	11	"Big and Bad"	February 8, 2023
181	12	"A Warm Heart and a Tombstone"	February 15, 2023
182	13	"Terror on Toy Island"	February 22, 2023
183	14	"Daughters of the Crown"	March 1, 2023
184	15	"Leap of Faith"	March 8, 2023
185	16	"In the Land of Giants"	March 15, 2023
186	17	"The Last Wish"	March 22, 2023
187	18	"The Trials of Baba Yaga"	March 29, 2023
188	19	"The Ending of All Things (Part 1)"	April 5, 2023
189	20	"The Ending of All Things (Part 2)"	April 12, 2023

=== The Ravening War ===
No. overall	No. in season	Title	Original release date
190	1	"The Seeds of Conflict"	May 10, 2023
191	2	"Bloody Harvest"	May 17, 2023
192	3	"Yonder Where the Fruits Do Be Lyin'"	May 24, 2023
193	4	"The Light and the Shadow"	May 31, 2023
194	5	"The Seventh Kingdom"	June 7, 2023
195	6	"The Heart of the World"	June 14, 2023

=== Dungeons and Drag Queens ===
No. overall	No. in season	Title	Original release date
196	1	"Queens on a Quest"	June 28, 2023
197	2	"Welcome to the Underworld"	July 5, 2023
198	3	"The Time Has Come"	July 12, 2023
199	4	"In the Heart of Death"	July 19, 2023

=== Mentopolis ===
No. overall	No. in season	Title	Original release date
200	1	"The Big Guy"	August 9, 2023
201	2	"The Scattered Mind"	August 16, 2023
202	3	"F For Freezer"	August 23, 2023
203	4	"Grappling with Death"	August 30, 2023
204	5	"Emergency Powers"	September 6, 2023
205	6	"Case Closed"	September 13, 2023

=== Burrow's End ===
No. overall	No. in season	Title	Original release date
206	1	"The Red Warren"	October 4, 2023
207	2	"Bearing the Scars"	October 11, 2023
208	3	"A Second Sun"	October 18, 2023
209	4	"Last Bast"	October 25, 2023
210	5	"Protect the Light"	November 1, 2023
211	6	"Reactor Charlie"	November 8, 2023
212	7	"The First Stoats"	November 15, 2023
213	8	"Five"	November 22, 2023
214	9	"Human"	November 29, 2023
215	10	"Evolution and Revolution"	December 6, 2023

=== Fantasy High: Junior Year ===
No. overall	No. in season	Title	Original release date
216	1	"Summer Scaries"	January 10, 2024
217	2	"Summer Breakdown"	January 17, 2024
218	3	"Not All Who Wanda Are Lost"	January 24, 2024
219	4	"Under Pressure"	January 31, 2024
220	5	"Mall Madness"	February 7, 2024
221	6	"Party Politics"	February 14, 2024
222	7	"Stress Tested"	February 21, 2024
223	8	"Fracas at the Frostyfaire Folk Festival"	February 28, 2024
224	9	"Vulture Clash"	March 6, 2024
225	10	"Cursed Out"	March 13, 2024
226	11	"A Very Merry Moonar Yulenear"	March 20, 2024
227	12	"Baron's Game"	March 27, 2024
228	13	"Infernal Conflict"	April 3, 2024
229	14	"Dawn of Justice"	April 10, 2024
230	15	"The Last Stand"	April 17, 2024
231	16	"Untapped Rage"	April 24, 2024
232	17	"The Name"	May 1, 2024
233	18	"Rock the Boat"	May 8, 2024
234	19	"Ragenarok (Part 1)"	May 15, 2024
235	20	"Ragenarok (Part 2)"	May 22, 2024

=== Never Stop Blowing Up ===
No. overall	No. in season	Title	Original release date
236	1	"Be Kind, Rewind"	June 26, 2024
237	2	"And That's Whirred Up"	July 3, 2024
238	3	"The Deluxe Royale"	July 10, 2024
239	4	"Under the Night Sun"	July 17, 2024
240	5	"Double Death Doggy Style"	July 24, 2024
241	6	"Meet the Santangelos"	July 31, 2024
242	7	"Dang Dang Revolution"	August 7, 2024
243	8	"The Wings That Flap in the Night"	August 14, 2024
244	9	"Without Our Siblings"	August 21, 2024
245	10	"Superbomb"	August 28, 2024

=== Misfits and Magic: Season 2 ===
No. overall	No. in season	Title	Original release date
246	1	"A Meeting of Misfits"	September 25, 2024
247	2	"Magma and Mingle"	October 2, 2024
248	3	"A Place of Knowing"	October 9, 2024
249	4	"A Change of Plan"	October 16, 2024
250	5	"K's Anatomy"	October 23, 2024
251	6	"Code Crimson"	October 30, 2024
252	7	"The Heart of Weugan"	November 6, 2024
253	8	"The Man We've Been Waiting For"	November 13, 2024
254	9	"The Magic of Creation"	November 20, 2024
255	10	"Turducken"	November 27, 2024
256	11	"The Show Goes On"	December 4, 2024

=== Dungeons and Drag Queens season 2 ===
No. overall	No. in season	Title	Original release date
257	1	"Princess and the Paramours"	January 8, 2025
258	2	"Through the Venomlands"	January 15, 2025
259	3	"Ice, Ice, Fae-by"	January 22, 2025
260	4	"Shady by the Sea"	January 29, 2025
261	5	"The Queens Take Matali"	February 5, 2025
262	6	"The Battle for Darktide"	February 12, 2025

=== Titan Takedown ===
No. overall	No. in season	Title	Original release date
263	1	"Party Animals"	April 2, 2025
264	2	"Bouts and Boogies"	April 9, 2025
265	3	"A Bird in the Hand"	April 16, 2025
266	4	"Hope and Heroism"	April 23, 2025

=== Cloudward, Ho! ===
No. overall	No. in season	Title	Original release date
267	1	"On High We Go"	June 4, 2025
268	2	"The Path Out of Gath"	June 11, 2025
269	3	"Secrets at the South Pole Station"	June 18, 2025
270	4	"Beyond the Biangle"	June 25, 2025
271	5	"A Tussle in Tabira City"	July 2, 2025
272	6	"Raptors at Ramansu"	July 9, 2025
273	7	"Melee Among the Magnamensa"	July 16, 2025
274	8	"Mysteries and The Metal Men"	July 23, 2025
275	9	"A Clockwork Crew Rendezvous"	July 30, 2025
276	10	"Skirmish Above the Swirling Sea"	August 6, 2025
277	11	"Enigmas at the Ectic Station"	August 20, 2025 (Note: A mid-season recap was released halfway through.)
278	12	"An Odious Occurrence in Oda"	August 27, 2025
279	13	"Eyeless Crisis at Katur"	September 3, 2025
280	14	"Mounting Mysteries at Mount Charuk"	September 10, 2025
281	15	"Run-in with the Ruinous Queen"	September 17, 2025
282	16	"A Fraught Forge in Zern"	September 24, 2025
283	17	"Revelations in the Ruins"	October 1, 2025
284	18	"A Curious Conclave in Zumhara"	October 8, 2025
285	19	"The Straka Strikes"	October 15, 2025
286	20	"Outward Past Beyond"	October 22, 2025

=== Gladlands ===
No. overall	No. in season	Title	Original release date
287	1	"Welcome to the Wastes"	January 7, 2026
288	2	"Fake It Till You Fake It"	January 14, 2026
289	3	"Collabotage"	January 21, 2026
290	4	"Poppy Persona Non Grata"	January 28, 2026
291	5	"A Hugi Minute"	February 4, 2026
292	6	"Good Vibrations"	February 11, 2026

=== City Council of Darkness ===
No. overall	No. in season	Title	Original release date
293	1	"Mishaps, a Maw, and the Masquerade"	April 8, 2026
294	2	"Blood, Business, and Beth's Husband"	April 15, 2026
295	3	"Life Begins at Night"	April 22, 2026
296	4	"The Silo, a Specter, and the Student Body"	April 29, 2026
297	5	"Origins and Adversaries"	May 6, 2026
298	6	"The Sunday Scoop and Spiteful Spirits"	May 13, 2026
299	7	"A Co-op and a Caretaker"	May 20, 2026
300	8	"A Fraternal Order and an Author of Horror"	May 27, 2026
301	9	"A Bid, a Banksy, and the Bird in the Basement"	June 3, 2026
302	10	"Zaeth's Sire and a Bear on Fire"	June 10, 2026
303	11	"A Coterie, Cracked"	June 17, 2026
304	12	"The Prince and the Primogen"	June 24, 2026
305	13	"A Symposium and a Song"	July 1, 2026
306	14	"An Undead Denouement"	July 8, 2026

=== Toylight ===
No. overall	No. in season	Title	Original release date
307	1	"Sing a Song of Six"	September 16, 2026
308	2	"Run, Run, as Fast as You Can"	September 23, 2026
309	3	"The Worms Crawl in, the Worms Crawl Out"	September 30, 2026
310	4	"Ashes, Ashes, We All Fall"	October 7, 2026
311	5	"Ol' Block Bridge Is Falling Down"	October 14, 2026
312	6	"The Cradle Will Fall"	October 21, 2026

=== A Starstruck Odyssey Season 2 ===
No. overall	No. in season	Title	Original release date
313	1	TBA	2027

=== Specials ===
No.	Title	Campaign(s)	Original release date	Filming date
1	"Fantasy High LIVE in Brooklyn"	Fantasy High	June 24, 2019	N/A
2	"Fantasy High LIVE at RTX Austin"	Fantasy High	July 17, 2019	July 5, 2019
3	"College Visit (RTX @ Home Live)"	Fantasy High: Sophomore Year	September 21, 2020	September 21, 2020
4	"Boys' Night! (Roll20Con)"	Fantasy High: Sophomore Year	October 24, 2020	October 24, 2020
5	"Misfits and Magic Holiday Special"	Misfits and Magic	December 15, 2021	N/A
6	"Misfits and Magic Live at GenCon 2022"	Misfits and Magic	September 16, 2022	August 6, 2022
7	"Quangle in Queal Quife"	Time Quangle	September 12, 2024	April 17, 2024
8	"Betrayed by Live Theatre"	Time Quangle	September 19, 2024	April 18, 2024
9	"A Candied Coup"	Time Quangle	December 12, 2024	April 20, 2024
10	"The EnWoodening"	Time Quangle	December 19, 2024	April 21, 2024
11	"The Wrong Kids"	Time Quangle	December 26, 2024	April 23, 2024
12	"A New York Quangle"	Time Quangle	December 26, 2024	April 24, 2024
13	"Gauntlet at the Garden"	The Unsleeping City • Time Quangle	May 13, 2025	January 24, 2025
14	"Battle at the Bowl"	Fantasy High: Junior Year	November 12, 2025	June 1, 2025
15	"Quangle Quest"	Fantasy High: Junior Year • Time Quangle	December 10, 2025	July 20, 2025
16	"Viva Más Vegas"	A Starstruck Odyssey	March 11, 2026	November 1, 2025
17	"D20 On a Bus: Season 2"	On a Bus (Game Changer)	April 1, 2026	N/A

== Time Quangle ==
A series of six live non-canonical Dimension 20 events titled "Time Quangle" was held in Ireland and the United Kingdom in April 2024. At the start of each live show, performers (the "Intrepid Heroes") rolled dice to determine the characters and setting, pulling randomly from five past Dimension 20 campaigns: Fantasy High, The Unsleeping City, A Crown of Candy, A Starstruck Odyssey, and Neverafter. Dropout recorded each performance and released them in late 2024 as a six-episode non-canonical "Time Quangle" series.

Title	Date filmed	Venue	City	Setting	Character(s)					
Title	Date filmed	Venue	City	Setting	Axford	Beardsley	Murphy	Oyama	Thompson	Wilson
"Quangle in Queal Quife"	Apr 17, 2024	SEC Armadillo	Glasgow, Scotland	The Neverafter (Neverafter)	Ylfa Snorgelsson (Neverafter)	Liam Wilhelmina (A Crown of Candy)	Big Barry Syx (A Starstruck Odyssey)	Ricky Matsui (The Unsleeping City)	Rowan Berry (The Unsleeping City)	—
"Betrayed by Live Theatre"	Apr 18, 2024	O2 Apollo	Manchester, England	The Neverafter (Neverafter)	Sofia Lee (The Unsleeping City)	Margaret Encino (A Starstruck Odyssey)	Big Barry Syx (A Starstruck Odyssey) Kugrash (The Unsleeping City)	Gorgug Thistlespring (Fantasy High)	Rowan Berry (The Unsleeping City)	—
"A Candied Coup"	Apr 20, 2024	Eventim Apollo	London, England	Calorum (A Crown of Candy)	Sundry Sidney (A Starstruck Odyssey)	Pete Conlan (The Unsleeping City)	Kugrash (The Unsleeping City)	Skip (A Starstruck Odyssey) Lapin Cadbury (A Crown of Candy)	Adaine Abernant (Fantasy High)	Fabian Seacaster (Fantasy High)
"The EnWoodening"	Apr 21, 2024	Eventim Apollo	London, England	Calorum (A Crown of Candy)	Fig Faeth (Fantasy High)	Kristen Applebees (Fantasy High) Margaret Encino (A Starstruck Odyssey) Sir Amanda Maillard (A Crown of Candy)	Cody Walsh (The Unsleeping City)	Gorgug Thistlespring (Fantasy High)	Adaine Abernant (Fantasy High)	Pinocchio (Neverafter)
"The Wrong Kids"	Apr 23, 2024	3Olympia Theatre	Dublin, Ireland	Spyre (Fantasy High)	Fig Faeth (Fantasy High)	Liam Wilhelmina (A Crown of Candy)	Gerard of Greenleigh (Neverafter)	Ricky Matsui (The Unsleeping City)	Rosamund du Prix (Neverafter)	—
"A New York Quangle"	Apr 24, 2024	3Olympia Theatre	Dublin, Ireland	New York (The Unsleeping City)	Ylfa Snorgelsson (Neverafter)	Kristen Applebees (Fantasy High)	Riz Gukgak (Fantasy High) Kugrash (The Unsleeping City)	Puss in Boots (Neverafter)	Ruby Rocks (A Crown of Candy)	—
