= Misfits and Magic =

10th and 23rd seasons of Dimension 20

- Also known as: Dimension 20: Misfits and Magic
- Genre: Fantasy; Actual play
- Inspired by: Harry Potter
- Directed by: Michael Schaubach
- Creative director: Orion Black (season 1)
- Starring: Aabria Iyengar; Erika Ishii; Brennan Lee Mulligan; Danielle Radford; Lou Wilson
- No. of seasons: 2
- No. of episodes: 17 (list of episodes)

Production
- Executive producers: David Kerns; Brennan Lee Mulligan; Sam Reich
- Producers: David Kerns (season 1); Hallie Mayer (season 2)
- Running time: c. 60–180 minutes

Original release
- Network: Dropout
- Release: June 30, 2021 – December 4, 2024

Related
- Dimension 20

Misfits and Magic are the tenth and twenty-third seasons of Dimension 20, an actual play anthology web series which features various tabletop role-playing games. It aired from June 30, 2021 to July 21, 2021 on Dropout with two specials released in December 2021 and August 2022. The season was reviewed favorably, with a sequel season premiering on September 25, 2024 as the 23rd season of Dimension 20.

Inspired by Harry Potter, the show features Aabria Iyengar as the game master with the player cast of Erika Ishii, Brennan Lee Mulligan, Danielle Radford, and Lou Wilson as Americans who are invited to a Hogwarts-like school to study magic. However, the show deviates from and criticizes its source material for perceived bigotry, making modifications to some aspects of the material and highlighting the absurdity in other aspects. In addition, Misfits and Magic sought to rebut Harry Potter's lack of diversity in its central casting, making its own cast and characters majority-black. The second Misfits and Magic season is a continuation of the original campaign set three years later, in which the pilot program members reunite to investigate the disappearance of magic from the world.

== Cast and characters ==
- Aabria Iyengar as the game master
- Erika Ishii as Karen Keiko Tanaka, a.k.a. XxBrokenDreamxX, who goes by "Dream" and later "K"
- Brennan Lee Mulligan as Evan Kelmp
- Danielle Radford as Samantha Butler, who is also known by her streamer name Sam Black and later Sam Britain
- Lou Wilson as Whitney Jammer, who goes by Jammer

== Premise ==
Misfits and Magic is inspired by, and is a reaction to, the Harry Potter series and contemporary changes in its public perception. The reputation of the Harry Potter series slipped in the decades after its release, as various new analyses shone a light on elements of the series—and public statements of its author, J. K. Rowling—that have been criticized as bigoted. Creative director Orion D. Black told The Daily Dot that the season sought to counter Harry Potter's lack of diverse representation in its central cast. At the same time, Black and Aabria Iyengar both felt that the series still had a meaningful impact on them, and wanted to tell a story that captured that. They also sympathized with those who chose not to watch the season because of its connection to Harry Potter.

To that end, Misfits and Magic emulates many aspects of Harry Potter, sometimes as a tribute, sometimes in mockery. In a similar line to Harry Potter, the season follows four Americans with no prior magical ability as they attempt to navigate the culture of Gowpenny, a secret school of witchcraft and wizardry meant to serve as a parallel to Hogwarts. However, the characters also rebel against the source material; for example, during the sorting ceremony, they disrupt the scene with criticism of Gowpenny's (and implicitly, Hogwarts's) tracking of students into "houses", and particularly the existence of the "evil" house. The setting itself also deviates from the source in some ways: the kitchen, for example, was not staffed by slave labor akin to the house elf. Further, in what the creators and actors saw as a departure from the Harry Potter series, Misfits and Magic focuses primarily on actors and characters of color, with the season featuring a majority-black cast and a non-binary character.

== Production ==
Misfits and Magic departed significantly from other seasons in Dimension 20 in terms of production. Rather than Dungeons & Dragons, the first season of Misfits and Magic uses the Kids on Brooms system, and instead of Dimension 20's regular arrangement of minis and battle maps, it mostly utilizes theatre of the mind. The show was developed by game master Aabria Iyengar and Dimension 20 creative director Orion D. Black. The season was also Brennan Lee Mulligan's first season as a player, as he usually serves as the show's game master.

Seasons of Dimension 20 are broadly divided into Intrepid Heroes campaigns and Side Quests campaigns; Misfits and Magic was the first Side Quest campaign to receive a second season. The first season of Misfits and Magic was the tenth season of Dimension 20; a second season of Misfits and Magic, Dimension 20's twenty-third season, premiered in September 2024. The cast reprise their roles in the second season, which picks up three years after the events of the first season. This campaign uses the Never Stop Making Magic system, which is a custom mix of the Kids on Brooms system and Dropout's Never Stop System. Like the first season, the second does not utilize battle maps, but instead features other set elements.

== Episodes ==
=== Series overview ===
Season	D20 season	Episodes	Originally released	
Season	D20 season	Episodes	First released	Last released
1	10	4	June 30, 2021	July 21, 2021
S	—N/a	2	December 15, 2021	August 6, 2022
2	23	11	September 25, 2024	December 4, 2024

=== Season 1 (2021) ===
No. overall	No. in season	Title	Original release date
1	1	"The Chosen Ones"	June 30, 2021
2	2	"Class Conflict"	July 7, 2021
3	3	"Family on Six"	July 14, 2021
4	4	"We're the Heroes"	July 21, 2021

=== Specials ===
No. overall	No. in season	Title	Original release date
5	1	"Misfits and Magic Holiday Special"	December 15, 2021
6	2	"Misfits and Magic Live at GenCon 2022"	August 6, 2022
Note: Iyengar introduces a different cast of characters to the Gowpenny Academy of Arcane Arts. Features Becca Scott as Andre Henreek, Michelle Nguyen Bradley as Chip n Rip, Noxweiler Berf as Dangerwolf Darkhawk, and Markeia McCarty as Premium Va-Casians.

=== Season 2 (2024) ===
No. overall	No. in season	Title	Original release date
7	1	"A Meeting of Misfits"	September 25, 2024
8	2	"Magma and Mingle"	October 2, 2024
9	3	"A Place of Knowing"	October 9, 2024
10	4	"A Change of Plan"	October 16, 2024
11	5	"K's Anatomy"	October 23, 2024
12	6	"Code Crimson"	October 30, 2024
13	7	"The Heart of Weugan"	November 6, 2024
14	8	"The Man We've Been Waiting For"	November 13, 2024
15	9	"The Magic of Creation"	November 20, 2024
16	10	"Turducken"	November 27, 2024
17	11	"The Show Goes On"	December 4, 2024

== Reception ==
Michael Crider of PC World reviewed the season favorably, complimenting Brennan Lee Mulligan's performance as Evan Kelmp and his character's arc, which foils Dream's. He also wrote that the show's format makes it "a great introduction to the actual play format". Brandon Zachary, for ScreenRant, similarly thought that Mulligan as Evan Kelmp was the show's "highlight" within the entire "delightful" cast. Zachary noted that "among the elements of Harry Potter the series takes deliberate aim at is the inherently evil 'Dark Lord' archetype" and Misfits and Magic "subverts Voldemort's lack of a true character arc by giving their take on that character a far more compelling storyline".

Academic Emma French, in the Journal of Cinema and Media Studies, commented that the cast of Misfits and Magic "critique Rowling's work" through their game and that "rather than facilitating imitation, TTRPGs allow players to respond critically to texts, revising them through play". French noted that there is a "desire to transform or reclaim Rowling's works" which the Kids on Brooms system can facilitate "as demonstrated by the fan-controlled secondary and tertiary texts that form Misfits and Magic" which opened "its first episode with the statement 'fuck TERFs'". She explained that "while participants in Gowpenny Academy's Pilot Programme are marginalized as 'non-magical people,' several players and their characters also belong to racial minorities sidelined in Rowling's work" – Misfits and Magic gestures "toward Rowling's tokenistic racial representation" and "connects the fictional conceit of the Pilot Programme with a much wider political question of who can access, and move unimpeded, through a magical world that has its basis in reality". The show not only criticizes "Rowling's approach to naming ethnic minorities" but also "the players widen this discussion from Rowling's own textual practices to wider consequences of 'assimilation into wizard culture'"; the cast's "existing animosity toward Rowling and frustration at the restrictive conventions of the magic school subgenre result in a wizarding world that is not replicated but challenged and changed".

Theo Kogod of CBR recalled Misfits and Magic when Wizards of the Coast, the company that publishes Dungeons & Dragons, released a supplement for a magical university called Strixhaven which is inspired by "Harry Potter and other stories about magic schools". Kogod noted that Misfits and Magic had seen the need for a Harry Potter actual play system well before.
