= Worlds Beyond Number =

Actual play fantasy podcast

- Genre: Actual play; Fantasy podcast
- Language: English

Creative team
- Created by: Erika Ishii, Aabria Iyengar, Taylor Moore, Brennan Lee Mulligan, Lou Wilson

Cast and voices
- Starring: Erika Ishii, Aabria Iyengar, Brennan Lee Mulligan, Lou Wilson

Production
- Length: 60 – 150 minutes

Publication
- No. of seasons: 5
- No. of episodes: 65
- Original release: March 1, 2023
- Provider: Fortunate Horse (2023)
- Updates: Bi-Weekly

Related
- Website: worldsbeyondnumber.com

Worlds Beyond Number is an actual play audio drama podcast created by Erika Ishii, Aabria Iyengar, Taylor Moore, Brennan Lee Mulligan, Lou Wilson and narrated by the same group (minus Moore). The first campaign, titled The Wizard, the Witch, and the Wild One, was released to the public on March 1, 2023 and ran for four seasons. The second campaign, titled Solari, premiered on March 17, 2026.

The podcast was originally produced by publisher Fortunate Horse. Paid Patreon subscribers have access to exclusive content only produced on that platform.

== History ==
Worlds Beyond Number is an actual play audio drama; their initial story, entitled The Wizard, The Witch, & The Wild One, premiered in March 2023. It follows a trio of friends on their adventures through the fantastical world of Umora, a campaign setting created by Brennan Lee Mulligan. Mulligan serves as the initial gamemaster, while Erika Ishii plays the character of Ame, a witch; Aabria Iyengar plays Suvi, a wizard; and Lou Wilson plays Eursulon, a spirit. The first book of this campaign ran for four seasons with the finale of book 1 released on August 12, 2025.

The second campaign, Solari, is set in space and features Iyengar as the gamemaster. It premiered on March 17, 2026. In May 2026, they announced that Solari would go on hiatus during Iyengar's maternity leave, with Wilson serving as the gamemaster for an upcoming interstitial campaign. This campaign, World Turner, premiered on September 1, 2026.

Also in May 2026, Worlds Beyond Number and Skybound announced a Kickstarter campaign for a prelude graphic novel adaptation based on The Wizard, The Witch, & The Wild One. The story was created by the cast members; the graphic novel will be scripted by Jadzia Axelrod with art by Sarah Webb. In June 2026, the campaign exceeded its funding goal on the day it launched.

== Production ==
Worlds Beyond Number airs on a biweekly schedule on various public podcasting platforms. The show also has exclusive content for their Patreon subscribers; this includes their behind-the-scenes Fireside Chats aftershow. The narrators – Erika Ishii, Aabria Iyengar, Brennan Lee Mulligan, and Lou Wilson – are also the show's co-creators. Taylor Moore, of Fortunate Horse, was the original producer, designer, and composer. Moore created the "soundscape" to accompany Mulligan's game descriptions; he used Pro Tools. Moore stated that they chose audio as their storytelling medium due to affordability. On the podcast's creation process, Moore explained that it started with "a few story meetings, writers meetings" between him and Mulligan before Mulligan speaks "with the cast, usually one-on-one". From there, Moore built "a recording studio in the bedroom of an Airbnb" in Los Angeles and they recorded "a bunch of episodes in there"; he then cut these episodes with an assistant editor.

The second campaign, Solari (2026), was produced by Worlds Beyond Number itself; it featured edit and sound design by Jino Jang-Hansen, at Big Giant Head, and a score by Will Savino. The show was recorded from a new studio.

=== Game system ===
The first campaign, The Wizard, The Witch, & The Wild One, uses Dungeons & Dragons (D&D) as its role-playing game system. Mulligan explained that they "edit out a lot of the dice rolling and the doing math and me looking up an ability. But people, especially people that are familiar with the game will see the mechanics at work right away". On picking D&D as the first campaign's system, Mulligan highlighted that its "mechanical offerings", such as "adventure, high-stakes combat, mystery, intrigue, skill checks, a very well-designed codified magic system", allow "for a certain kind of problem-solving and cleverness". Iyengar and Wilson play as a wizard and a paladin, respectively. Ishii uses the witch character class which was created for the show by designer Mazey Veselak with additional design by Brandes Stoddard. A playtest version of this class was then released to the show's Patreon subscribers in October 2023 before it went on sale in December 2024.

The second campaign, Solari, uses the Stillfleet role-playing game system.

== Campaigns ==
The Worlds Beyond Number storyline occurs across campaigns that either consist of story arcs played over multiple episodes, or in one-shots recorded all at once.

Campaigns
| Title | Episodes | Gamemaster | Info | First aired | Last aired |
|---|---|---|---|---|---|
Main campaigns
| The Wizard, the Witch, and the Wild One | 54 | Brennan Lee Mulligan | First campaign (seasons 1–4) | March 1, 2023 | August 12, 2025 |
| Solari | 11 | Aabria Iyengar | Second campaign (season 5) | March 17, 2026 | TBA |
Limited series and specials
| Children's Adventure | 8 | Brennan Lee Mulligan | Prequel to The Wizard, the Witch, and the Wild One; patreon-exclusive | March 1, 2023 | |
| A County Affair | 2 | Erika Ishii | One-shot | June 29, 2023 | July 13, 2023 |
| Space Cram: Reasonable Hoop Dreams | 2 | Aabria Iyengar | Patreon-exclusive | September 14, 2023 | September 28, 2023 |
| Twelve Brooks | 1 | Brennan Lee Mulligan | Interlude set in the world of The Wizard, the Witch, and the Wild One | April 2, 2024 | |
| The Clearing | 1 | Brennan Lee Mulligan | Interlude set in the world of The Wizard, the Witch, and the Wild One | September 17, 2024 | |
| Matsuri | 1 | Erika Ishii | Interlude set in the world of The Wizard, the Witch, and the Wild One | September 30, 2024 | |
| Hint | 4 | Erika Ishii | Murder mystery limited series | September 2, 2025 | October 14, 2025 |
| Fortune Found | 1 | Brennan Lee Mulligan | Interlude set in the world of The Wizard, the Witch, and the Wild One | October 28, 2025 | |
| Fiasco | 2 | None | One-shot | November 11, 2025 | November 25, 2025 |
| Alf Gappen Was Here | 1 | Brennan Lee Mulligan | Interlude set in the world of The Wizard, the Witch, and the Wild One | December 9, 2025 | |
| Flight of the Icaron | 5 | Lou Wilson | A science fiction limited series set in outer space | January 6, 2026 | March 3, 2026 |
| World Turner | 8 | Lou Wilson | | September 1, 2026 | TBA |

== Reception ==
On February 1, 2023, more than 2,500 people watched the cast livestream on Instagram as they launched the Patreon page for their podcast. The podcast is ranked first in the Patreon 'Games' category and tenth among all Patreon accounts by number of paid supporters, as of April 2024.

Henry St Leger, for Dicebreaker, described The Wizard, The Witch, and The Wild One as a "D&D campaign that feels half Critical Role, half radio drama, enjoying the machinations of its original fantasy world like children watching clouds scroll by above them, occasionally interrupted by a storm". He praised the slow pace where it took eight months for the main characters to increase a level, noting that "it feels removed from the usual pressures of levelling-up as fast as you can to save the world in the nick of time. The minutiae of character development is as important – if not more important – than how many spell slots you have, and the ability to defuse or sidestep situations, to find alternative ways forward when you know your strength isn’t enough, is crucial". He highlighted that this "original fantasy setting by Mulligan" focuses on "everyday people caught in the middle of insurmountable geopolitical tensions" and takes the time "to flesh out the life of the world at its own pace" which allows the audience to "luxuriate in the details".

Charlie Hall of Polygon highlighted the lack of combat in this campaign, noting it has sparked discussion on why the show is using Dungeons & Dragons as its game system. Hall commented that "while the many D&D materials published by Wizards of the Coast are heavy on the combat – including major campaigns and some anthologized adventures – there's nothing in the rules that stops players from working together to tell stories and build the kinds of interconnected narratives on display in Worlds Beyond Number". He opined that "the non-combat interactions in Worlds Beyond Number are some of the best I've experienced in any actual play".
