= Exandria Unlimited =

- Genre: Fantasy; Actual play
- Created by: Marisha Ray
- Based on: Critical Role; Dungeons & Dragons 5th edition
- Starring: List: Ashley Johnson; Robbie Daymond; Liam O'Brien; Aimee Carrero; Matthew Mercer; Aabria Iyengar; Anjali Bhimani; Erica Lindbeck; Lou Wilson; Marisha Ray; Luis Carazo; Sam Riegel; Travis Willingham; Brennan Lee Mulligan; Jasmine Don; Alex Ward; Celia Rose Gooding
- Country of origin: United States
- Original language: English
- No. of seasons: 3
- No. of episodes: 18

Production
- Production locations: Los Angeles, California
- Running time: Approximately 197–367 minutes per episode
- Production company: Critical Role Productions

Original release
- Network: Twitch; YouTube
- Release: June 24, 2021 – present

Related
- Critical Role

Exandria Unlimited (ExU) is an American actual play anthology web series where the cast plays Dungeons & Dragons using the fifth edition ruleset. It is set in the Exandria campaign setting and is a spin-off of the web series Critical Role.

The first season follows the Crown Keepers, a party of adventurers, in their travels across the continent of Tal'Dorei. It was originally broadcast from June 24 to August 12, 2021 with a two-part continuation released at the end of March 2022. The second season, titled Exandria Unlimited: Calamity, was broadcast from May 26 to June 16, 2022. It follows a group of heroes from the Age of Arcanum who attempt to prevent the Calamity. A third season, titled Exandria Unlimited: Divergence, was broadcast from February 13 to March 6, 2025. Set in the wake of the Calamity, Divergence focuses on mortals rebuilding the world.

== Premise ==
Exandria Unlimited (ExU) is set in the city of Emon on the continent of Tal'Dorei 30 years after Campaign One and 10 years after Campaign Two. IGN reported, in June 2021, that "Exandria Unlimited will be considered canon within the wider Critical Role story, and 'will affect future environments and timelines across the overall lore of Critical Role.' So as fans await what may come from Campaign 3 of the core CR cast, Unlimited looks to offer a new vantage point into the world of Exandria". IGN also highlighted that "it's likely not the only such story planned; the announcement for the series teases that 'Within the world of Exandria, there are an unlimited amount of stories to be told - and we have only just begun'."

Exandria Unlimited: Kymal follows Dorian Storm's return to his friends after his time in Campaign Three and the party's subsequent adventure in the Tal'Dorei city of Kymal.

Exandria Unlimited: Calamity follows a new group of heroes from the Age of Arcanum who attempt to prevent the Calamity. It is set in the floating city of Avalir. Nerdist highlighted, "as the second age of Exandria, the Age of Arcanum is set about 1,500 years before the events of Critical Role. So they're digging way back into the world's past". The Calamity was an apocalyptic series of events caused by a civil war among the Exandrian pantheon and their followers. This war imperiled the entirety of Exandria and "only one-third of the [world's] population" survived.

Exandria Unlimited: Divergence follows a group of average people who flee Rybad-Kol, where they had been imprisoned in service of the Strife Emperor during the Calamity, and their survival after a cataclysm. Divergence focuses on mortals rebuilding the world after the destruction of the Calamity as the Prime Deities construct the Divine Gate which will remove all gods from Exandria.

== Production ==
On June 10, 2021, Critical Role announced a new eight-episode limited series, titled Exandria Unlimited, which premiered on June 24, 2021. It aired between the end of Critical Role's second campaign and the start of the third campaign. In March 2022, Critical Role announced that the two-part adventure continuation, titled Exandria Unlimited: Kymal, would be released at the end of the month.

In May 2022, they announced that the four-episode long second season, titled Exandria Unlimited: Calamity. It premiered on May 26, 2022 and aired during the hiatus of Critical Role's third campaign. Following the end of the third campaign, Exandria Unlimited: Divergence premiered on February 13, 2025. Divergence was shot in a single week.

=== Development ===
Marisha Ray, creator of ExU and creative director of Critical Role Productions, highlighted that the franchise decided to run ExU to both explore new aspects of Exandria and to avoid burnout for the main Critical Role cast, especially Matthew Mercer—creator of the Exandria campaign setting and the main campaign's Dungeon Master. Ray said, "Realistically, we only get to experience Exandria through the eyes of a handful of people, in a very linear setting with each campaign. But there's a lot of other shit going on, not just on the other side of the planet but throughout time and history. So beyond just wanting to explore more of Exandria itself, we also wanted to explore more stories from different storytellers, and to show that anybody can create and build within the world of Exandria".

Aabria Iyengar (known for other streaming shows such as Happy Jacks RPG, Dimension 20, and Saving Throw) is the first season's Dungeon Master – it is the first Critical Role show to feature a Dungeon Master other than Mercer. On the design aspect for a limited series, Iyengar said, "It's the perfect thing because it creates this narrative scalpel. It's a very different type of storytelling in a familiar world".

Brennan Lee Mulligan, the second season's Dungeon Master, told SyFy Wire that "he was inspired to set his potential ExU series in this mythical historical era following a conversation over dinner he had with Mercer in 2021 about the then-burgeoning idea for the spinoff series". Mulligan stated that Mercer "mentioned the Age of Arcanum and The Calamity and there was a little something in his voice. Like, 'Not idly do the leaves of Lórien fall.' With him saying it, I could tell it was a part of the world he had envisioned that ExU would explore". Mulligan credits Mercer, Ray, lore keeper Dani Carr, and producer Kyle Shire for helping him "define this time period" and "supporting his vision". On setting Calamity during an apocalypse, Mulligan said, "If your only question is 'does the Calamity happen or not?' that's a different series. The question here is 'What is the nature of mortal beings when faced with this?' [...] There are different — and, in my opinion, more interesting — questions to be answered here than 'does the doom come or no?'".

With Divergence, Mulligan came up with the game design concept of having the players as "level zero characters" and this idea was "further developed during a collaborative character creation session with" the players. The goal was to "capture" a "sense of helplessness" and the experience of "average individuals" in this time period. Liam O'Brien, a player in this season, commented that "we don't want to watch people ground into dust. But, if you're watching a story and there's no consequence, no challenge, no cost, sometimes the impact doesn't hit. You need both: the light and the dark, the hope and the fear. It's a story about people finding hope".

=== Casting ===
The first season is helmed by Iyengar and features Critical Role cast members Ashley Johnson, O'Brien, and Mercer as players. ExU also introduces two additional newcomers to Critical Role – Robbie Daymond and Aimee Carrero. Johnson plays as the faun druid Fearne Calloway, Daymond plays as the air genasi bard Dorian Storm, O'Brien plays as the halfling fighter Orym of the Air Ashari, Carrero plays as the human warlock Opal, and Mercer plays as the dwarf sorcerer Dariax Zaveon.

Daymond, Mercer, Carrero, and Iyengar reprised their roles for Exandria Unlimited: Kymal. Anjali Bhimani, who was previously an ExU guest star, also reprised her role as the fire genasi monk Fy'ra Rai. Erica Lindbeck joined the cast as Morrighan Ferus, a lagomore rogue.

Exandria Unlimited: Calamity is led by Mulligan as the Dungeon Master. It features Iyengar and Critical Role cast members Ray, Sam Riegel, Travis Willingham as players along with newcomers Lou Wilson and Luis Carazo. Their characters are high-level and showcase races and subclasses new to the Exandria setting. Carazo plays as the human paladin Zerxus Ilerus, Riegel plays as the changeling bard/warlock Loquatius Seelie, Iyengar plays as the elf wizard Architect Arcane Laerryn Coramar-Seelie, Wilson plays as the human sorcerer/bard Guildmaster Nydas Okiro, Willingham plays as the eisfuura rogue Cerrit Agrupnin, Guardian of the Seventh, and Ray plays as the elf wizard Patia Por'co, The Keeper of Scrolls.

Mulligan returned as the Game Master for Exandria Unlimited: Divergence. It features Critical Role cast members Mercer and O'Brien as players along with newcomers Jasmine Don, Alex Ward, and Celia Rose Gooding. The player characters start with "Level 0 NPC" stat blocks. Mercer plays as the dwarf stonemason Garen, Gooding as the half-elf healer Rei'nia Saph, Don as the halfling gang leader Fiedra Marrow, O'Brien as the gold dragonborn wanderer Erro Moradaurum, and Ward as the white dragonborn bodyguard Crokas.

=== Crossovers ===
Daymond, O'Brien, and Johnson reprise their ExU characters in Critical Role's third campaign; while ExU's first season takes place chronologically before the third campaign, Kymal is concurrent to the third campaign. Daymond's character Dorian exited the third campaign after fourteen episodes. Dorian's return to the Crown Keepers is then covered in Kymal. In Campaign 3 Episode 92, Mercer dismissed the main cast at the ad break including "himself as Dungeon Master". The episode then picked up with Iyengar as the Dungeon Master with Mercer, Daymond, Carrero, Bhimani, and Lindbeck reprising their player roles from Kymal. The following episode wrapped up the Crown Keepers storyline with the guest cast; the main Critical Role cast returned after the ad break with Daymond as the only continuing guest star.

At the end of Campaign 3 Episode 98, Critical Role announced the next episodes would be a three-part special titled "Downfall" with Mulligan as the Dungeon Master and player cast as Laura Bailey, Taliesin Jaffe, Ashley Johnson, Noshir Dalal, Nick Marini, and Abubakar Salim. Cheryl Teh of Business Insider noted that "Downfall" focuses on the fall of the magocracy Aeor during the Calamity and suggested this would "allow Mulligan to flex his storytelling chops, perhaps reprising some elements of his first EXU: Calamity run". Mulligan commented that the two series wrestle with very different themes so while both are about the fall of flying cities, each has a distinct story. Mulligan also highlighted that while Calamity shows the trigger of the Calamity, it was more about the end of the Age of Arcanum while Downfall occurs over a century into the Calamity and showcases that era.

Zerxus Ilerez, played by Carazo, appears in the third season of The Legend of Vox Machina (2022) which is an animated adaptation of Critical Role's first campaign. Petrana Radulovic of Polygon highlighted the "impactful" inclusion of Zerxus. Radulovic noted that in the canon, the Calamity occurs "centuries before the events of The Legend of Vox Machina", however, Zerxus as a character "didn't even exist till five years after the original Vox Machina campaign ended, so the entire interaction with Pike is new to the show". Nydas Okiro, played by Wilson, then appears in the first season of The Mighty Nein (2025) which is an animated adaptation of Critical Role's second campaign.

== Episodes ==
=== Series overview ===
Season	Title	Episodes	Originally released		
Season	Title	Episodes	First released	Last released	Network
1	Exandria Unlimited	10	June 24, 2021	April 1, 2022	Twitch, YouTube
2	Exandria Unlimited: Calamity	4	May 26, 2022	June 16, 2022	Twitch, YouTube
3	Exandria Unlimited: Divergence	4	February 13, 2025	March 6, 2025	Twitch, YouTube, Beacon

=== Exandria Unlimited (2021–22) ===
Episode	Title	Original release date	Notes
1	"The Nameless Ones"	June 24, 2021	–
2	"The Oh No Plateau"	July 1, 2021	–
3	"A Glorious Return"	July 8, 2021	–
4	"By the Road"	July 15, 2021	Guest starring Anjali Bhimani
5	"A Test of Worth"	July 22, 2021	Guest starring Anjali Bhimani
6	"The Gift Among the Green"	July 29, 2021	Guest starring Anjali Bhimani
7	"Beyond the Heart City"	August 5, 2021	–
8	"What Comes Next"	August 12, 2021	–
Special
9	"Exandria Unlimited: Kymal, Part 1"	March 31, 2022	–
10	"Exandria Unlimited: Kymal, Part 2"	April 1, 2022	–

=== Exandria Unlimited: Calamity (2022) ===
Episode	Title	Original release date	Notes
1	"Excelsior"	May 26, 2022	Calamity was broadcast in Critical Role's timeslot during campaign three's hiatus.
2	"Bitterness and Dread"	June 2, 2022	–
3	"Blood and Shadow"	June 9, 2022	–
4	"Fire and Ruin"	June 16, 2022	–

=== Exandria Unlimited: Divergence (2025) ===
Episode	Title	Original release date	Notes
1	"Give and Take"	February 13, 2025	Divergence was broadcast in Critical Role's timeslot following the end of campaign three.
2	"Seven of Them"	February 20, 2025	–
3	"Mirror and Key"	February 27, 2025	–
4	"By Heart Alone"	March 6, 2025	–

== Reception ==
Chris King, for Polygon in July 2021, commented that the show's episode length is a potential barrier of entry and that the opening hook "can leave newcomers feeling as though they're missing something". King also called Iyengar "extraordinary" with a "unique style" and highlighted that "Iyengar's work here goes a long way toward proving that Critical Role doesn't always need Mercer at the head of the table to succeed". In a review of episode eight, The Geekly Grind highlighted that "this series wasn't to everyone's tastes, but overall I think it was a fun little mini-series to give the Critters nation a little taste of what the Critical Role channel could become in the future. [...] This was a fun, crazy, surprisin [sic] and fantastic start to a great new series. I hope to see new GMs and players (both DnD vets and newbies) in future series. As much as I'm jonesing for another longform campaign, these quick mini-series have a real potential to snag many new friends and viewers to Critical Role". Jennifer Melzer, for CBR in August 2021, wrote that "Iyengar's style is incredibly different from Critical Role's main Dungeon Master Matthew Mercer [...]. While both approach Dungeons & Dragons wholeheartedly with the story in mind, Iyengar went above and beyond at times to see her players flesh out their in-game vision in ways some DMs may consider controversial – but it worked". Melzer highlighted that early poor dice rolls led to the characters' rough start, "however, their struggles became incredibly endearing". Melzer commented that "incorporating history, lore, story elements and even characters from past campaigns made the world familiar enough that it was easy for fans to fall in love with the story, the new players and the new DM even while missing those not at the table. [...] The mini-campaign did more than just hold fans over until the next full season – it was a successful experiment that deserves to come back in the future".

Melzer, for CBR in April 2022, highlighted Exandria Unlimited: Kymal; she commented on the plot threads that were revisited in Kymal, though, "Iyengar and the cast managed to leave fans with some serious cliffhangers and a brand new cast member they want to know more about. While it may not be entirely feasible for Critical Role to turn EU into a weekly campaign, there is certainly room (and fan desire) to at least see the cast more often. [...] The success of the side-series and number of plot threads left dangling make it all but inevitable that the Crown Keepers will reappear at some point, hopefully in a more permanent fashion".

Michael Buttrey and Leah DeJong, in an essay in the book Theology, Religion, and Dungeons & Dragons (2025), highlighted Zerxus's character arc where he "attempts atone for the blatantly evil god Asmodeus and fails", noting that Calamity "articulates a more subtle question by revealing that Zerxus's obsession with redeeming Asmodeus is what allows him to be manipulated by the devil and contribute to bringing about the Calamity". They commented that Zerxus's "character arc turns out to be a corruption or anti-redemption arc" which asks the audience "to consider whether the pursuit of redemption usually seen in Critical Role is inherently worthwhile".
