= Dimension 20 =

Tabletop role-playing web series

- Genre: Fantasy; Dungeons & Dragons; Actual play
- Created by: Brennan Lee Mulligan
- Based on: Dungeons & Dragons 5th edition
- Directed by: Michael Schaubach
- Starring: Brennan Lee Mulligan; Lou Wilson; Ally Beardsley; Zac Oyama; Emily Axford; Siobhan Thompson; Brian Murphy
- Country of origin: United States
- Original language: English
- No. of seasons: 29
- No. of episodes: 307 (+ 16 one-shots & live shows) (list of episodes)

Production
- Executive producers: Sam Reich; David Cyr Kerns; Brennan Lee Mulligan
- Producer: Rick Perry
- Running time: c. 60–180 minutes
- Production company: Dropout (formerly known as CollegeHumor)

Original release
- Network: Dropout
- Release: September 26, 2018 – present

Dimension 20 is an actual play show produced by and broadcast on Dropout, and created and generally hosted by Brennan Lee Mulligan as the show's regular Dungeon Master. It is an anthology series, with the setting and cast changing between seasons. Most of the games use Dungeons & Dragons 5th edition. Long seasons, featuring a core cast of players in seventeen or more episodes, are interspersed with shorter side quests, featuring a rotating cast in eleven or fewer episodes.

== History ==
=== Origins at CollegeHumor (2018–2020) ===
Dimension 20 originated as a production for Dropout, a streaming service launched by CollegeHumor in 2018 to deliver content with R-rated material or an unusual format. Dimension 20 was among the shows listed for the service when it was first unveiled. The format for the show, with distinct story arcs in different settings, was determined early on in the show's development. The host, Brennan Lee Mulligan, had been DMing since the age of 10 and had a background as a live action role-playing game writer. He had been the dungeon master for a private campaign with most of the principal cast of Dimension 20, only lacking Lou Wilson and Ally Beardsley.

The series' launch took place amid a "renaissance" of actual play shows. Mulligan cited a number of existing tabletop shows as inspiration for Dimension 20, including Not Another D&D Podcast (NADDPod), The Adventure Zone and Critical Role. One such show, NADDPod, features Emily Axford and Brian Murphy, who would join Dimension 20's primary cast. Guests were also drawn from Critical Role and The Adventure Zone early on in the show's run – Matthew Mercer first appeared in Escape from the Bloodkeep and Griffin McElroy appeared in a live episode of Fantasy High in 2019. The full cast of The Adventure Zone appeared in Tiny Heist in early 2020.

The show debuted in 2018 with the first season of Fantasy High. A sequel to this campaign, titled Fantasy High: Sophomore Year, premiered in 2019. Episodes of Fantasy High: Sophomore Year were streamed live on Twitch, unlike the pre-recorded and edited style of other campaigns on Dropout. The season concluded with a two-part finale titled "Spring Break! I Believe in You!", which was streamed remotely due to the COVID-19 pandemic. Announced on the fifth anniversary of Dimension 20, a third season of this campaign – Fantasy High: Junior Year – premiered in January 2024.

The launch of the show took place amid financial troubles at CollegeHumor, which had suffered from a pivot to Facebook video in the late 2010s based on inaccurate metrics. By late 2019, InterActiveCorp (IAC), the company's owner since 2006, was exploring the sale of CollegeHumor. In January 2020, the Dimension 20 cast was laid off as part of larger layoffs at CollegeHumor. Mulligan was left as the only creative staff member on payroll at the company. The show nevertheless continued production remotely as California's stay at home orders were put into effect. CollegeHumor was rebranded as Dropout and continued to produce content, heavily focusing on Dimension 20.

=== Return to studio production and success (2021–present) ===
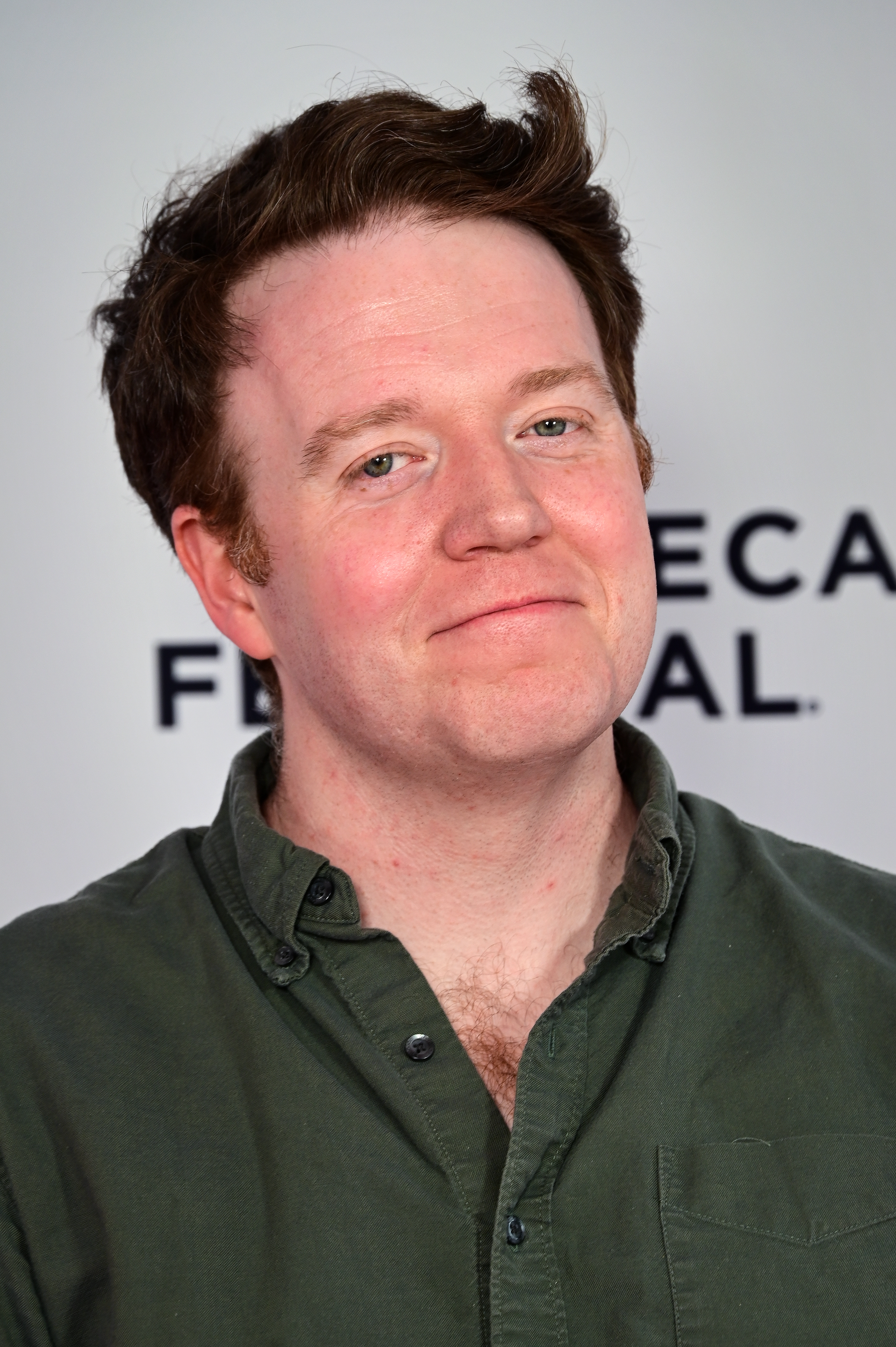
Dimension 20 creator and DM Brennan Lee Mulligan (pictured in 2026)

On May 24, 2021, Brennan Lee Mulligan announced that Dimension 20 and other CollegeHumor projects would resume production in-person and in-studio, adhering to COVID safety guidelines set by SAG-AFTRA and other film guilds and production unions. The show also began to use rotating game masters for side-quest campaigns in a change announced the following month. The company was able to hire more staff beyond its initial skeleton crew, and was in a more positive financial situation by 2024.

Beginning in 2022, Dropout began to auction off miniatures from previous seasons of Dimension 20. The proceeds from the auctions went towards funding future seasons of the show, as well as to charitable causes. This began with A Crown of Candy pieces. A Fantasy High auction in 2024 donated 100% of profit to the Palestine Children's Relief Fund, and for the first time included scenery pieces and segments of the Dungeon Master's screen.

During the 2023 SAG-AFTRA strike, production on Dimension 20 initially shut down. In July 2023, Dropout CEO Sam Reich stated that as Dropout is not a member of the AMPTP, they "may be able to reach an interim agreement with SAG" which would allow them to resume production. Reich commented, "but we'll only do that, obviously, if we get the blessing of the union and the buy-in of our performers. If not, we have enough content in the can to last us a little past the end of the year". In August 2023, Reich announced that all Dropout shows had resumed production, as it was determined that their "New Media Agreement for Non-Dramatic Programming" was under a non-struck SAG-AFTRA contract.

In January 2025, Dimension 20 announced that the original Fantasy High campaign would be adapted as a webcomic, to be released on Webtoon. The series launched on March 31, 2025, and ran for 58 issues, referred to as episodes. An adaptation of Fantasy High: Sophomore Year is scheduled to follow.

In July 2025, the Game Changer episode "Fool's Gold" featured a satirical segment titled Dimension 20: On a Bus!, in which Katie Marovitch poorly ran a game for Mulligan along with Jasmine Bhullar, Aabria Iyengar and Matthew Mercer. For April Fools' Day in 2026, Dropout released a one-episode follow-up titled Dimension 20 On a Bus: Season 2.

== Format ==
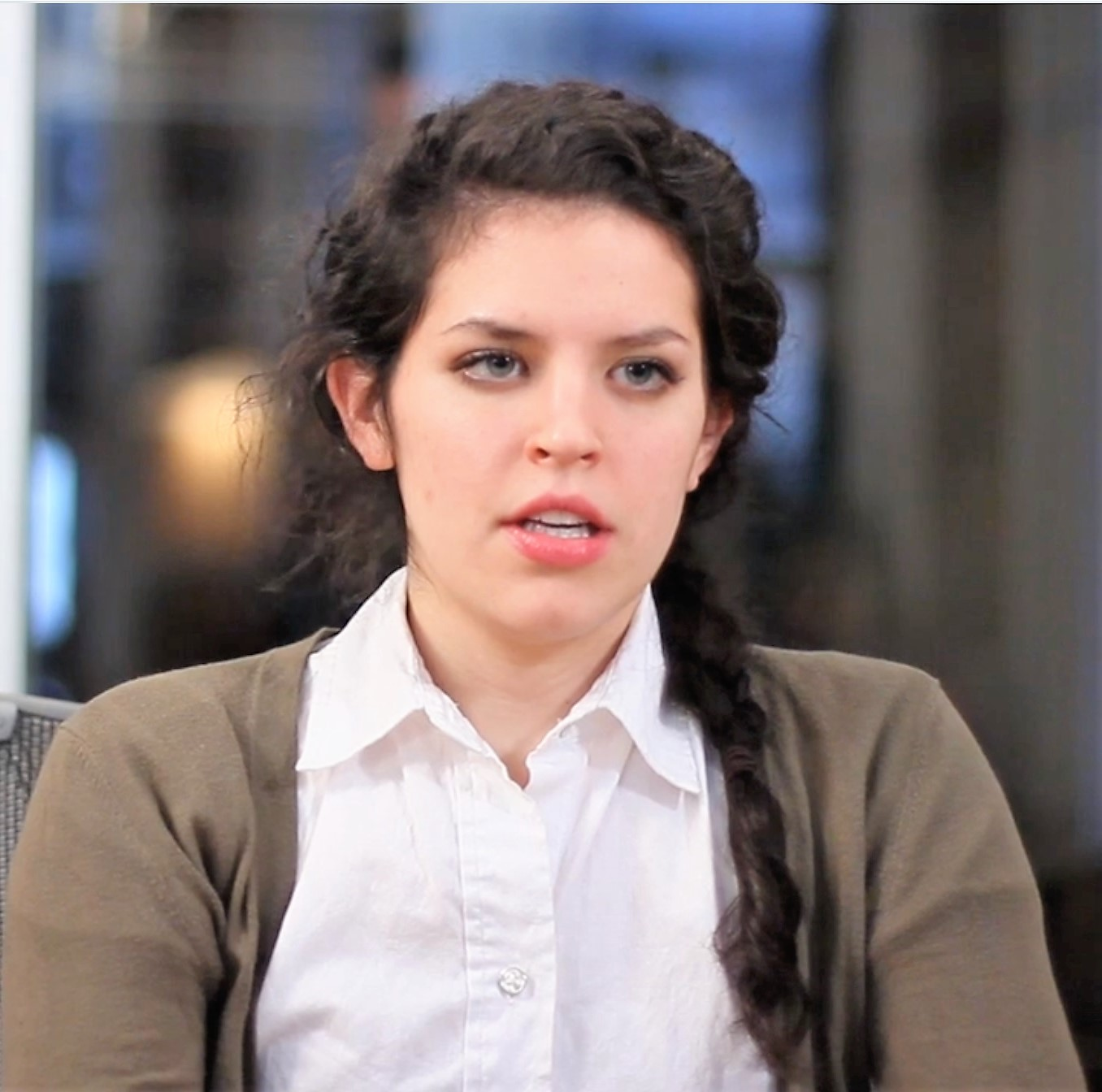
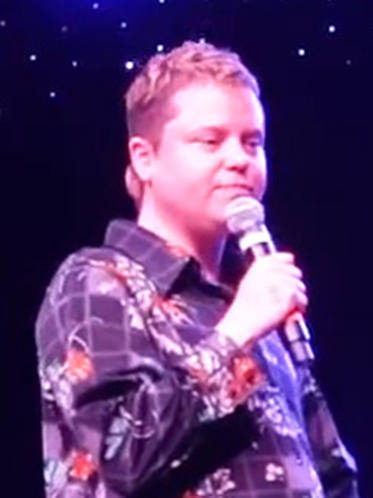
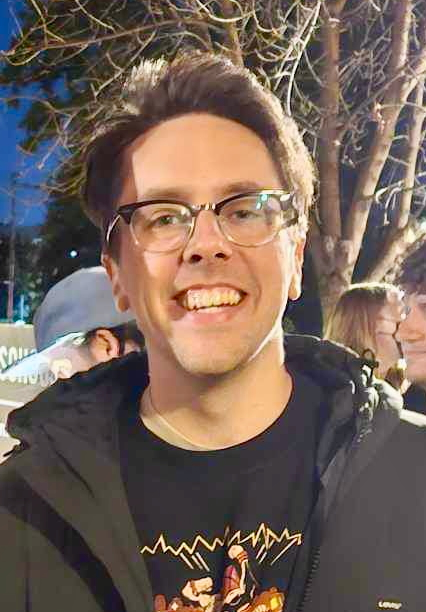
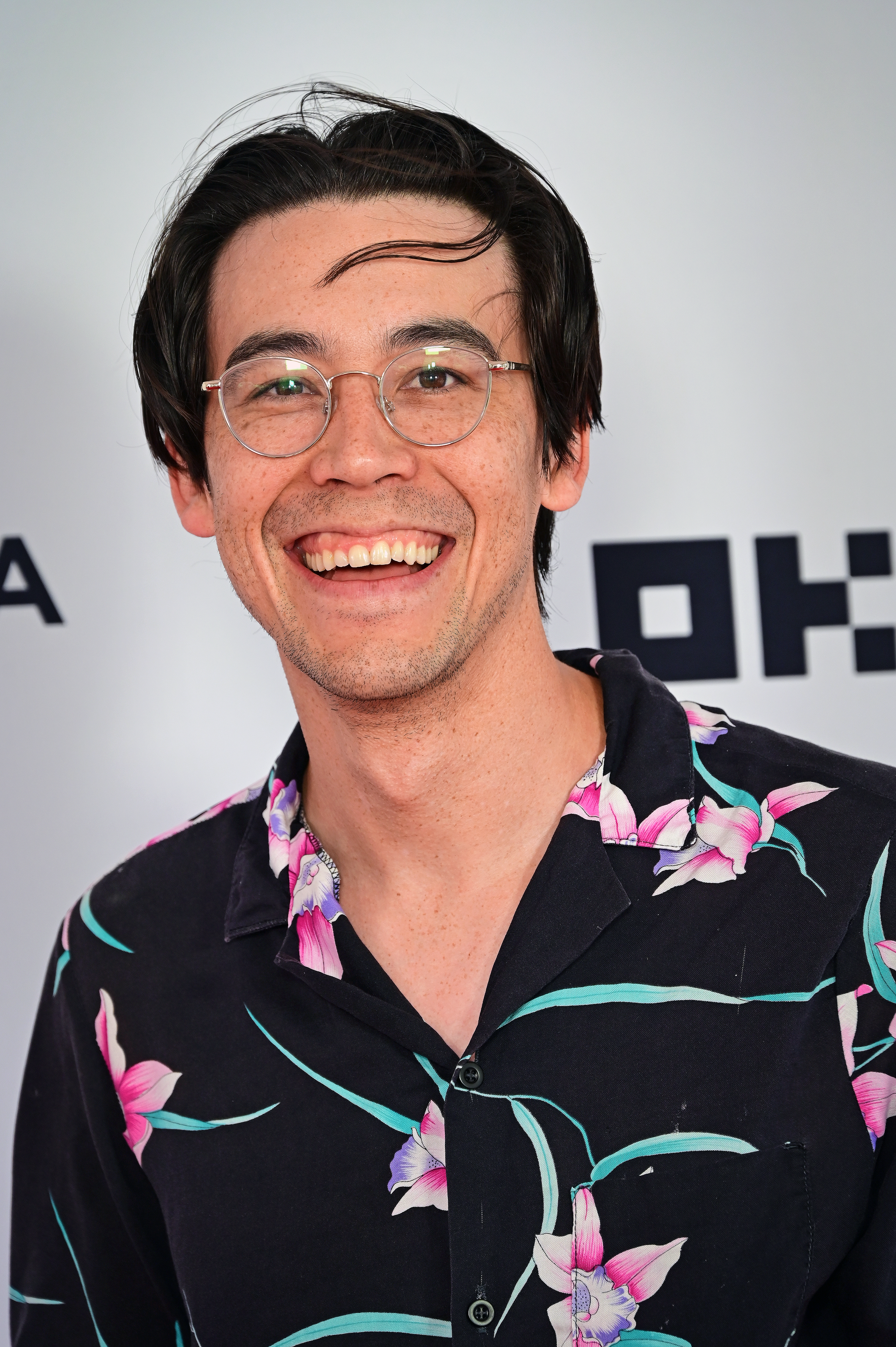
Selected "Intrepid Heroes" cast members, clockwise from upper left: Emily Axford, Ally Beardsley, Zac Oyama, Brian Murphy.

The seasons of the show are broadly divided into "Intrepid Heroes" campaigns, which feature a recurring group of six players, and "Side Quests", which feature guest players. Intrepid Heroes campaigns feature Mulligan as the Dungeon Master, along with players Emily Axford, Ally Beardsley, Brian Murphy, Zac Oyama, Siobhan Thompson, and Lou Wilson. These seasons are generally between seventeen and twenty episodes in length, and a campaign setting is sometimes revisited in additional seasons. As of 2026, there have been ten Intrepid Heroes seasons: Fantasy High, The Unsleeping City, Fantasy High: Sophomore Year, A Crown of Candy, The Unsleeping City: Chapter II, A Starstruck Odyssey, Neverafter, Fantasy High: Junior Year, Cloudward, Ho!, City Council of Darkness, and Toylight. A 2024 Time Quangle live tour in the UK and Ireland also featured the Intrepid Heroes cast and acted as a crossover between the main campaigns. The players drew randomly from their past characters, using bingo machines to set up each show. The Time Quangle performances were recorded, and were released on Dropout throughout 2024.

Mulligan acted as the game master for the first four side quests, after which the show started to use other Game Masters for these campaigns, in addition to Mulligan. Aabria Iyengar is the most recurring guest Game Master, having appeared in the role four times. Guest players for Side Quests are generally CollegeHumor alumni or cast members of other actual play shows, however, there are exceptions such as Dungeons and Drag Queens, which featured notable contestants from RuPaul's Drag Race.

=== Cast members by campaign ===
Key
Symbol	Meaning
*	Intrepid Heroes campaign; DM Mulligan
^	Side quest campaign; DM/GM Mulligan
§	Side quest campaign; GM Iyengar
Δ	Side quest campaign; other GM/DM
DM/GM	Cast member is the dungeon master or game master of a specific campaign
	Cast member appears in a specific campaign
Live	Cast member appears only in one or more live episodes of a specific campaign

Main and recurring cast appearances by campaign
Campaign Cast member	1	2	3	4	5	6	7	8	9	10	11	12	13	14	15	16	17	18	19	20	21	22	23	24	25	26	27	28	29
Campaign Cast member	*Fantasy High	^Escape from the Bloodkeep	*The Unsleeping City	*Fantasy High: Sophomore Year	^Tiny Heist	*A Crown of Candy	^Pirates of Leviathan	*The Unsleeping City: Chapter II	^Mice & Murder	§Misfits and Magic	^The Seven	ΔShriek Week	*A Starstruck Odyssey	ΔCoffin Run	§A Court of Fey and Flowers	*Neverafter	ΔThe Ravening War	^Dungeons & Drag Queens	^Mentopolis	§Burrow's End	*Fantasy High: Junior Year	^Never Stop Blowing Up	§Misfits and Magic Season 2	^Dungeons & Drag Queens Season 2	^Titan Takedown	*Cloudward, Ho!	^Gladlands	*City Council of Darkness	*Toylight
Main cast — "Intrepid Heroes"
Brennan Lee Mulligan	DM	DM	DM	DM	DM	DM	DM	DM	DM		DM		DM			DM		DM	GM		DM	GM		DM	DM	DM	GM	ST	DM
Emily Axford																													
Ally Beardsley																													
Brian Murphy																													
Zac Oyama																													
Siobhan Thompson																													
Lou Wilson																													
Recurring cast
Erika Ishii																													
Matthew Mercer																	DM												
Ify Nwadiwe																													
Rekha Shankar																													
Mike Trapp																													
Lily Du																													
Griffin McElroy	Live																												
Aabria Iyengar										GM					GM					DM			GM						
Carlos Luna																													
Danielle Radford																													
Isabella Roland																													
Becca Scott										Live																			
Oscar Montoya																													
Alaska Thunderfuck																													
Bob the Drag Queen																													
Jujubee																													
Monét X Change																													
Alex Song-Xia																													
Jacob Wysocki																													

=== Series overview ===
Campaign	Name	Episodes	Originally released		
Campaign	Name	Episodes	First released	Last released	Network
1	Fantasy High	17	September 26, 2018	January 9, 2019	Dropout, YouTube
2	Escape from the Bloodkeep	6	April 30, 2019	June 4, 2019	Dropout, YouTube
3	The Unsleeping City	17	July 9, 2019	October 29, 2019	Dropout, YouTube
4	Fantasy High: Sophomore Year	20	October 16, 2019	April 3, 2020	Dropout, Twitch, YouTube
5	Tiny Heist	6	January 9, 2020	February 13, 2020	Dropout (Note: The premiere episode of every season is also available in full on YouTube.)
6	A Crown of Candy	17	April 8, 2020	August 5, 2020	Dropout
7	Pirates of Leviathan	6	September 16, 2020	October 21, 2020	Dropout
8	The Unsleeping City: Chapter II	18	November 11, 2020	March 10, 2021	Dropout
9	Mice & Murder	10	April 7, 2021	June 9, 2021	Dropout
10	Misfits and Magic	4	June 30, 2021	July 21, 2021	Dropout
11	The Seven	10	August 18, 2021	October 20, 2021	Dropout
12	Shriek Week	4	November 10, 2021	December 1, 2021	Dropout
13	A Starstruck Odyssey	18	January 12, 2022	May 11, 2022	Dropout, YouTube
14	Coffin Run	6	June 8, 2022	July 13, 2022	Dropout
15	A Court of Fey & Flowers	10	August 3, 2022	October 5, 2022	Dropout
16	Neverafter	20	November 30, 2022	April 12, 2023	Dropout
17	The Ravening War	6	May 10, 2023	June 14, 2023	Dropout
18	Dungeons and Drag Queens	4	June 28, 2023	July 19, 2023	Dropout
19	Mentopolis	6	August 9, 2023	September 13, 2023	Dropout
20	Burrow's End	10	October 4, 2023	December 6, 2023	Dropout
21	Fantasy High: Junior Year	20	January 10, 2024	May 22, 2024	Dropout
22	Never Stop Blowing Up	10	June 26, 2024	August 28, 2024	Dropout
23	Misfits and Magic: Season 2	11	September 25, 2024	December 4, 2024	Dropout
24	Dungeons and Drag Queens Season 2	6	January 8, 2025	February 12, 2025	Dropout
25	Titan Takedown	4	April 2, 2025	April 23, 2025	Dropout
26	Cloudward, Ho!	20	June 4, 2025	October 22, 2025	Dropout
27	Gladlands	6	January 7, 2026	February 11, 2026	Dropout
28	City Council of Darkness	14	April 8, 2026	July 8, 2026	Dropout
29	Toylight	6	September 16, 2026	October 21, 2026	Dropout
30	A Starstruck Odyssey Season 2	TBA	2027	2027	Dropout
Specials	Specials	17	June 24, 2019	April 1, 2026	Dropout

== Campaigns ==
The campaigns use the Dungeons & Dragons 5th edition system, with Brennan Lee Mulligan as the Dungeon Master (DM), unless otherwise stated. The DM or Game Master (GM) also creates house rules that alter the role-playing game system the campaign is using.

Key
Symbol	Meaning
*	Intrepid Heroes campaign; DM Mulligan
^	Side quest campaign; DM/GM Mulligan
§	Side quest campaign; GM Iyengar
Δ	Side quest campaign; other GM/DM

No.	Eps.	Original airing		Cast	Description	Ref.
No.	Eps.	Start	End	Cast	Description	Ref.
* Fantasy High
1	17 (Note: Two live episodes were also recorded and are listed on Dropout as part of the first season, for a total of 19 episodes. One of these guest stars Griffin McElroy.)	Sep 26, 2018	Jan 9, 2019	Emily Axford as Figueroth "Fig" Faeth; Zac Oyama as Gorgug Thistlespring; Siobhan Thompson as Adaine Abernant; Lou Wilson as Fabian Aramais Seacaster; Ally Beardsley as Kristen Applebees; Brian Murphy as Riz "The Ball" Gukgak	Set in Elmville, an odd, anachronistic town resembling a high-fantasy John Hughes movie. "The Bad Kids" attend freshman year at high school Aguefort Adventuring Academy, which teaches students to become adventurers.	
^ Escape from the Bloodkeep
2	6	Apr 30, 2019	Jun 4, 2019	Rekha Shankar as Maggie; Matthew Mercer as Kraz-Thun / Leiland; Amy Vorpahl as Efink Murderdeath; Mike Trapp as Sokhbarr; Erika Ishii as Lilith; Ify Nwadiwe as Markus St. Vincent	The show's first "side quest" season, a parody of The Lord of the Rings. A cast of villains try to hide the death of their Sauron-esque leader from the rest of his evil armies.	
* The Unsleeping City
3	17	Jul 9, 2019	Oct 29, 2019	Zac Oyama as Ricky Matsui; Emily Axford as Sofia Bicicleta Lee; Lou Wilson as Kingston Brown; Siobhan Thompson as Misty Moore/Rowan Berry; Brian Murphy as Kugrash; Ally Beardsley as Pete "the Plug" Conlan	A campaign set in a magical version of modern-day New York City, where a group of New Yorkers protect its residents from knowing about the underlying magic in their city.	
* Fantasy High: Sophomore Year
4	20	Oct 16, 2019	Apr 3, 2020	See Fantasy High above	A continuation of Fantasy High. The Bad Kids leave Elmville to retrieve the Crown of The Nightmare King for 60% of their final grade. Streamed on Twitch as "Dimension 20 LIVE", then edited for Dropout. The campaign was the first to use "theater of the mind", not battle minis or sets. The two-part finale was recorded remotely due to Stay at Home orders during the COVID-19 pandemic.	
^ Tiny Heist
5	6	Jan 9, 2020	Feb 13, 2020	Justin McElroy as Rick Diggins; Clint McElroy as Boomer Coleoptera; Jessica Ross as Agnes; Lily Du as TI-83; Griffin McElroy as Bean; Travis McElroy as Car-Go Jones	In a city built into the walls and garden of a suburban house, a crew of "tiny people" (bugs, fairies, living toys, etc.) try to pull off a heist against a crime lord. Inspired by The Borrowers and Toy Story, and featuring the McElroys from The Adventure Zone.	
* A Crown of Candy
6	17	Apr 8, 2020	Aug 5, 2020	Ally Beardsley as Liam Wilhelmina; Brian Murphy as Sir Theobald Gumbar; Emily Axford as Princess Jet Rocks & Queen Saccharina Frostwhip; Siobhan Thompson as Princess Ruby Rocks; Lou Wilson as King Amethar Rocks; Zac Oyama as Chancellor Lapin Cadbury & Cumulous Rocks	Set in a Candy Land-inspired kingdom of Candia in a Game of Thrones-inspired setting of violence and political intrigue. Pre-recorded episodes, followed by a new live after-show with the cast (known as Adventuring Party) were released every Wednesday until the season finale.	
^ Pirates of Leviathan
7	6	Sep 16, 2020	Oct 21, 2020	Marisha Ray as Sunny Biscotto; Krystina Arielle as Barbarella "Bob" Sasparilla Gainglynn; Carlos Luna as Cheese Stormcrank; Aabria Iyengar as Myrtle; Matthew Mercer as "Unlucky" Jack Brakkow; B. Dave Walters as Marcid the Typhoon	In the same universe as Fantasy High, a group of pirates band together to prevent an evil insurance company from destroying their floating pirate city of Leviathan. This was the first campaign to be completely recorded remotely during the COVID-19 pandemic.	
* The Unsleeping City: Chapter II
8	18	Nov 11, 2020	Mar 10, 2021	Zac Oyama as Ricky Matsui; Emily Axford as Sofia Lee; Lou Wilson as Kingston Brown; Siobhan Thompson as "Anastasia" Iga Lisowski & Rowan Berry/Holly Branch; Brian Murphy as Cody "Night Angel" Walsh & Kugrash; Ally Beardsley as Pete Conlan	Three years after The Unsleeping City, the Dream Team reunites, with two new members, to stop internet-based media corporation Gladiator from destroying the balance between Dream and Waking Worlds. The remotely-recorded campaign used virtual tabletop Roll20 instead of physical dice, sets and figurines.	
^ Mice & Murder
9	10	Apr 7, 2021	Jun 9, 2021	Katie Marovitch as Gangie Green; Sam Reich as Buckster $ Boyd; Rekha Shankar as Daisy D'umpstaire; Raphael Chestang as Vicar Ian Prescott; Ally Beardsley as Lars Vandenchomp; Grant O'Brien as Detective Sylvester Cross	An Edwardian murder mystery campaign inspired by Sherlock Holmes, set in a world where characters are anthropomorphic animals, in the same vein as The Wind in the Willows, attending the birthday party of a wealthy estate owner. Recorded remotely.	
§ Misfits and Magic
10	4	Jun 30, 2021	Jul 21, 2021	Lou Wilson as Whitney Jammer; Erika Ishii as Dream / K (Karen Keiko Tanaka); Danielle Radford as Sam Black; Brennan Lee Mulligan as Evan Kelmp; Aabria Iyengar as the Game Master	A parody of Harry Potter with American exchange students at a British magical academy. The campaign uses the Kids on Brooms system, and is the first with a guest GM, and first in‑studio after the COVID-19 pandemic.	
^ The Seven
11	10	Aug 18, 2021	Oct 20, 2021	Aabria Iyengar as Antiope Jones; Rekha Shankar as Katja Cleaver; Becca Scott as Penny Luckstone; Erika Ishii as Danielle Barkstock; Isabella Roland as Ostentatia Wallace; Persephone Valentine as Sam Nightingale; Brennan Lee Mulligan as Zelda Donovan and the DM	The Seven Maidens, an adventuring party formed after the events of Fantasy High: Freshman Year, must go on a dangerous quest to prevent their party from being disbanded when their senior-year members graduate. The campaign used digital tabletop system TaleSpire for encounters and battles.	
Δ Shriek Week
12	4	Nov 10, 2021	Dec 1, 2021	Ify Nwadiwe as Terry Talbo; Ally Beardsley as Megan Mirror; Lily Du as Tuti IV; Dani Fernandez as Seven; Gabe Hicks as the Game Master	Monstrous "children of horror icons" find love and investigate a mystery in their first week as seniors at prestigious monster/human learning institution Bram University. Uses the Mythic system created by guest GM Gabe Hicks.	
* A Starstruck Odyssey
13	18	Jan 12, 2022	May 11, 2022	Lou Wilson as Gunthrie "Gunnie" Miggles-Rashbax; Siobhan Thompson as Riva; Zac Oyama as Norman "Skipper" Takamori / "Skip"; Ally Beardsley as Margaret Encino; Emily Axford as Sundry Sidney; Brian Murphy as Big Barry Syx	A campaign in the sci-fi Starstruck universe, which was co-created by Elaine Lee (Mulligan's mother) and Michael Kaluta, following the adventures of a crew of a ragtag space ship trying to save the galaxy. It uses the Star Wars 5e role-playing system.	
Δ Coffin Run
14	6	Jun 8, 2022	Jul 13, 2022	Isabella Roland as Dr. Aleksandr Astrovsky; Zac Oyama as Squing; Carlos Luna as Wetzel; Erika Ishii as May Wong; Jasmine Bhullar as the Game Master	A comedic vampire road trip where Dracula's entourage must return a nearly-dead Dracula to Transylvania – or die. The game uses a modified version of D&D 5th Edition.	
§ A Court of Fey and Flowers
15	10	Aug 3, 2022	Oct 5, 2022	Omar Najam as Prince Andhera; Brennan Lee Mulligan as Capt. K. P. Hob; Emily Axford as Lady Chirp Featherfowl; Lou Wilson as Lord Squak Airavis; Oscar Montoya as Delloso de la Rue; Surena Marie as Gwyndolin Thistle-hop / BINX Choppley; Aabria Iyengar as the Game Master	In a Regency era-inspired Fae Court, several of the realm's most prestigious aristocrats attend an event known as the Bloom. It utilizes 5e and Good Society game systems.	
* Neverafter
16	20	Nov 30, 2022	Apr 12, 2023	Siobhan Thompson as Princess Rosamund du Prix (based on Sleeping Beauty); Ally Beardsley as Mother Timothy Goose (based on Mother Goose); Lou Wilson as Pinocchio; Zac Oyama as Puss in Boots; Brian Murphy as Prince Gerard of Greenleigh (based on The Frog Prince); Emily Axford as Ylfa Snorgelsson (based on Little Red Riding Hood)	Marketed as "the horror season," featuring classic fairy tale characters whose stories have become twisted and violent as their land, the Neverafter, is corrupted by dark forces.	
Δ The Ravening War
17	6	May 10, 2023	Jun 14, 2023	Lou Wilson as Thane Delissandro Katzon; Brennan Lee Mulligan as Bishop Raphaniel Charlock; Aabria Iyengar as Karna Solara; Zac Oyama as Colin Provolone; Anjali Bhimani as Lady Amangeaux Epicée du Peche; Matthew Mercer as the Dungeon Master	A prequel to the previous campaign A Crown Of Candy set 20 years earlier, in which a disparate group of nobles are blackmailed into furthering the aims of a mysterious religious sect as the land of Comida slides into civil war.	
^ Dungeons and Drag Queens
18	4	Jun 28, 2023	Jul 19, 2023	Monét X Change as Troyánn; Alaska Thunderfuck as Princess; Bob the Drag Queen as Gertrude; Jujubee as Twyla	A high fantasy adventure where four adventurers, played by stars of RuPaul's Drag Race, descend into the underworld.	
^ Mentopolis
19	6	Aug 9, 2023	Sep 13, 2023	Alex Song-Xia as Conrad Schintz; Danielle Radford as Anastasia Tension; Mike Trapp as Hunch Curio; Siobhan Thompson as Imelda Pulse; Freddie Wong as Dan Fucks; Hank Green as The Fix	A homage to hard-boiled detective stories and film noir, set inside a human brain. Uses a homebrewed version of the Kids on Bikes system.	
§ Burrow's End
20	10	Oct 4, 2023	Dec 6, 2023	Brennan Lee Mulligan as Tula; Siobhan Thompson as Jaysohn; Rashawn Nadine Scott as Viola; Jasper William Cartwright as Thorn Vale; Erika Ishii as Ava; Isabella Roland as Lila; Aabria Iyengar as the Game Master	When their home is destroyed, a family of stoats is forced to fight to survive in the threatening Blue Forest. Inspired by Watership Down, Annihilation and The Secret of NIMH, as well as Redwall and The Animals of Farthing Wood.	
* Fantasy High: Junior Year
21	20	Jan 10, 2024	May 22, 2024	See Fantasy High above	A continuation of the original Fantasy High campaign. The Bad Kids struggle with their academic workload while investigating a rival adventuring party. This season features more elaborate projections made by season artist Cait May, along with a theme song by Sarah Barrios.	
^ Never Stop Blowing Up
22	10	Jun 26, 2024	Aug 28, 2024	Isabella Roland as Paula Donvalson / Jack Manhattan; Alex Song-Xia as Liv Skyler / Kingskin; Jacob Wysocki as Andy "Dang" Lightfoot / Greg Stocks; Ify Nwadiwe as Wendell Morris / Vic Ethanol; Ally Beardsley as Russell Feeld / Jennifer Drips; Rekha Shankar as Usha Rao / G13	A group of strip mall employees are sucked into a magic VHS tape, becoming characters in an '80s action movie, and must find a way to escape. The game uses a home-brewed system, titled Never Stop Blowing Up, which is based on the Kids on Bikes system.	
§ Misfits and Magic: Season 2
23	11	Sep 25, 2024	Dec 4, 2024	See Misfits and Magic above	A continuation of the original Misfits and Magic campaign set three years later, in which the pilot program members reunite to investigate the disappearance of magic from the world. The campaign uses the Never Stop Making Magic system which is a custom mix of the Kids on Brooms system and Dropout's Never Stop System.	
^ Dungeons and Drag Queens season 2
24	6	Jan 8, 2025	Feb 12, 2025	See Dungeons and Drag Queens above	A continuation of the original Dungeons and Drag Queens campaign.	
^ Titan Takedown
25	4	Apr 2, 2025	Apr 23, 2025	Xavier Woods as Julius Mortem; Bayley as Thea Kitterloo; Kofi Kingston as Adonis Thanaformus; Chelsea Green as Tabatha	An Athenian adventure featuring Greek mythology and professional wrestling, with the adventurers played by stars of WWE.	
* Cloudward, Ho!
26	20	Jun 4, 2025	Oct 22, 2025	Zac Oyama as Daisuke Bucklesby; Emily Axford as Marya Junková; Lou Wilson as Montgomery LaMontgommery; Brian Murphy as Maxwell Gotch; Siobhan Thompson as Vanellope Chapman; Ally Beardsley as Olethra MacLeod	A steampunk themed game, in which the members of the Windrider Society search for a lost continent to find their missing former captain.	
^ Gladlands
27	6	Jan 7, 2026	Feb 11, 2026	Oscar Montoya as Poppy Persona; Ally Beardsley as Quinn Wedbush; Kimia Behpoornia as Tess Tube5; Jacob Wysocki as KoKoMo; Vic Michaelis as Hugi; Zac Oyama as Connor Kawasaki	A Mad Max inspired game set in a post-apocalypse where people survive on kindness and joy. The game uses a modified version of the Kids on Bikes system.	
* City Council of Darkness
28	14	Apr 8, 2026	Jul 8, 2026	Brian Murphy as Mitch "Darkness Man" Frederick; Ally Beardsley as HJ Wingstreet; Siobhan Thompson as La Contesse Madeleine d'Artois; Zac Oyama as Zaeth Bondana; Emily Axford as Vesper "Bat Child" Childers; Lou Wilson as LaVonte Worthy	A horror themed game following a group of outcast vampires, who are forced to manage the local government in the small town of Purpee, Oregon. The game uses the Vampire: The Masquerade system in collaboration with White Wolf Publishing.	
* Toylight
29	6	Sep 16, 2026	Oct 21, 2026	Ally Beardsley as Calypso; Lou Wilson as Wyon & Pimploe; Brian Murphy as Ol' Clyde Horsey; Emily Axford as Tiddlywinks "Cutie Pie"; Zac Oyama as Avery Augustus Archibald Tinsley; Siobhan Thompson as Constance & Baba the Bear	A group of toys must protect the toys of their owner's sister from being taken over by the forces of darkness.	

== One-shots and live events ==
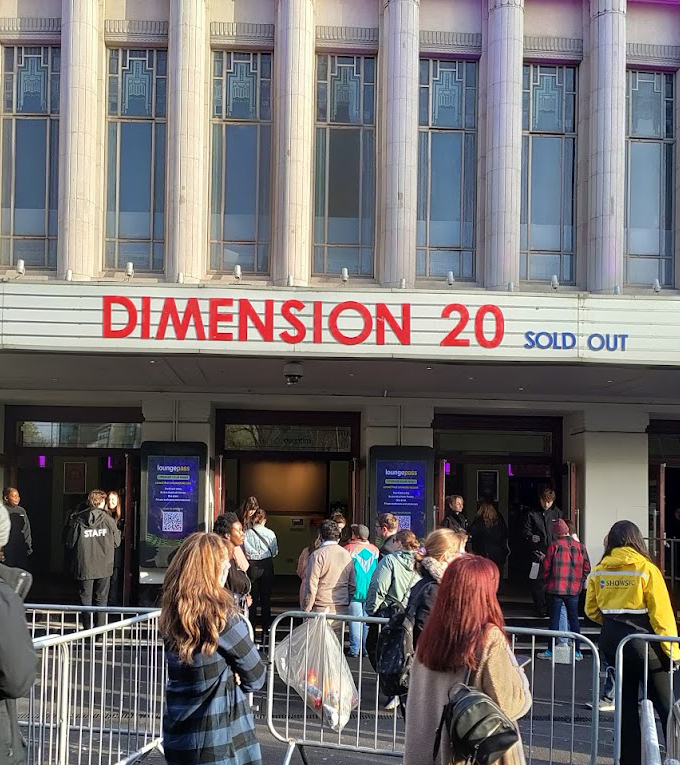
Dimension 20 at the Hammersmith Apollo during the 2024 UK and Ireland Time Quangle tour

Dropout has released multiple one-shot adventures, in addition to their full-length campaigns. Four have been extensions of the Fantasy High campaigns, including Dimension 20: Fantasy High! Live! at The Bell House (with Brian David Gilbert), Fantasy High LIVE at RTX Austin (with Griffin McElroy), College Visit (RTX @ Home Live), and Boys' Night! (Roll20Con), while two have been continuations of Misfits & Magic, consisting of the Misfits & Magic Holiday Special and Misfits & Magic Live at GenCon 2022 (Iyengar as GM, with players Noxweiler Berf, Michelle Nguyen Bradley, Markeia McCarty, Becca Scott).

A series of six live non-canonical Dimension 20 events titled "Time Quangle" was held in Ireland and the United Kingdom in April 2024. At the start of each live show, performers (the "Intrepid Heroes") rolled dice to determine the characters and setting, pulling randomly from five past Dimension 20 campaigns: Fantasy High, The Unsleeping City, A Crown of Candy, A Starstruck Odyssey, and Neverafter. Dropout recorded each performance and released them in late 2024 as a six-episode non-canonical "Time Quangle" series. A series finale called "Quangle Quest" was held at the Climate Pledge Arena in Seattle on July 20, 2025, and released on Dropout on December 10, 2025. Equipped with "Bracers of Quangling", the performers could select which of their characters they wanted to play throughout the show.

A performance at Madison Square Garden entitled "Gauntlet at the Garden", continuing the story of The Unsleeping City, occurred on January 24, 2025. As the venue's ticketing is managed by Ticketmaster, a surge pricing algorithm meant that tickets were briefly selling for thousands of dollars, at higher prices than comparable Taylor Swift tickets. Dimension 20 issued a statement afterwards, indicating that they had been unaware Ticketmaster was operating its dynamic pricing system for the venue, and that they had opted out of that system for all future events. Given that 15,000 tickets sold in four days, the event was expected to be the largest actual play show in the United States.

A live event set in the world of Fantasy High called "Battle at the Bowl" took place on June 1, 2025 at the Hollywood Bowl in Los Angeles; it was billed as a canonical event during which either Fabian Seacaster or Chungledown Bim would die. The Battle At the Bowl was released on Dropout on November 12, 2025.

A live event set in the A Starstruck Odyssey universe called "Viva Más Vegas" took place at the MGM Grand Garden Arena in Las Vegas on November 1, 2025: it followed a "Battle of the Brands" style battle, similar to one that took place in the original series, and was set after the events of the original series. Viva Más Vegas was released on Dropout on March 11, 2026.

== Production ==
=== Filming and set design ===
The dome set viewed from the outside during Fantasy High (2018)

The set for A Starstruck Odyssey (2022) which uses curved walls

In the late 2010s, the format pioneered by Critical Role — with the cast performing live in a full table multi-camera composite — had come to dominate actual play. Dimension 20 does not, however, follow this convention, but rather alternates between several cameras, which are presented full screen. With a typical episode runtime between two and three hours, Dimension 20 episodes also tend to be shorter than Critical Role episodes. The players were originally surrounded by a colored geodesic dome, with lighting adjusted scene by scene or images projected on its panels. Mulligan explained that "the idea of having the polyhedral dome as the center set piece of our set is an homage to the sort of polyhedral dice that make up a lot of these role-playing games". He described it as a "crystal cave" that "can go from a frosty fantasy feeling" to "more of a Fortress of Solitude, Sci Fi vibe", which allows the show to shift genre as needed. In 2020, a new set was constructed that utilizes curved walls, though it is still colloquially referred to as "the dome".

In an interview, director Michael Schaubach highlighted that Kenny Keeler, the original director of photography, started with a Dana dolly and that "in the years since, Schaubach has overseen the quest for a different, even more articulable jib, updated cameras, an LED projection system that can add shadows and animation onto the walls of the set, and, in Burrow's End, audio recordings presented as artifacts". Graham Sheldon, the director of photography for Neverafter (2022), stated that they typically used five cameras when filming the campaign with a setup that allowed closeup overhead shots of the maps and miniatures. Sheldon commented that while there is pre-planning to give "everyone a good sense of where things might go" during filming, the improvisational aspect of the show often required people "to hop on additional cameras to follow the action". Sheldon also highlighted that the director tracked "moments in real time that might be a good insert moment later for the minis" and "DP Kevin Stiller was able to shoot the mini closeups as a 2nd unit, occasionally while the main season was still filming in parallel". Multiple episodes are generally shot back to back, with editing taking place over several days for the batch. The format does add cost to the production, but the approach allows for the removal of pauses and the inclusion of post-production elements such as character art, illustrations, and footage of the battle terrain. Dimension 20 also has a lore keeper who manages "the show's encyclopedic, sprawling history, from timelines to factoids", and works with both the game master and players to keep information straight while they play, including fielding off-camera questions.

=== Game systems ===
Most Dimension 20 campaigns use the Dungeons & Dragons 5th edition system; however, several have used other role-playing game systems such as Kids on Bikes. In 2024, Dimension 20 used a new home-brewed system for the 22nd campaign, both of which were titled Never Stop Blowing Up. This system is based on Kids on Bikes. This system was then further customized, as the Never Stop Making Magic system, for the second season of Misfits and Magic.

In November 2024, Dropout released the Never Stop Blowing Up system for free on their website. The game system was designed primarily to work well for their filmed actual play show with less focus on game balance. On the usability of the system, Dimension 20 producer Carlos Luna stated, "We're not game designers. This is not a system that will stand the test of time. Hell, you'd be lucky if it lasted one whole session. But, I will say I think that would be a really fun session".

The City Council of Darkness campaign, in collaboration with White Wolf Publishing, uses a modified version of Vampire: The Masquerade. Jen Lennon of Kotaku wrote it is "kind of a huge deal that" an Intrepid Heroes campaign "is branching out into something completely different" with Vampire: The Masquerade. Lennon explained that previous Dimension 20's ventures into non-Dungeons & Dragons systems were limited to Side Quest campaigns, except for A Starstruck Odyssey (2022), "and even that used SW5E, an unofficial Star Wars system that's still based on" 5th Edition Dungeons & Dragons.

== Supplementary shows ==
Fantasy High: Extra Credit is a show that discusses the specifics about the first season, Fantasy High. Beginning with A Crown Of Candy, Dropout began airing a Dimension 20 Q&A and talkback show called Adventuring Party, in which the cast discusses the most recently recorded episode. The first four seasons were all filmed remotely and aired live following the release of the episode of Dimension 20 which aired that week, where fans submitted questions for Mulligan and the cast to answer. Once filming resumed in The Dome, however, the format changed to that of a commentary talkback show pre-recorded immediately after the filming of the previous episode.

Dropout also produces the supplementary show Adventuring Academy, a talk show in which Mulligan and a guest discuss elements of role-playing.

In January 2024, Dropout released a behind-the-scenes documentary titled The Legendary Rick Perry and the Art of Dimension 20, which focuses on the work done by the show's production designer and creative producer Rick Perry.

== Reception ==
CBR warmly received the show, describing it as "among the best of its kind". The review highlighted the arc-based format, which keeps the story fast-paced and allows the rotation of new players and voices in the space. The show has also been praised for its positive LGBTQ representation, with multiple characters exploring their sexualities during the first two seasons of Fantasy High.

Glen Weldon, for NPR in 2021, wrote: "Mulligan is such a good DM and he's got so many improv skills. He's such a close and responsive listener that no matter what the players throw at him, he can always roll with it, without breaking the game. And that is a very rare skill, so it's terrific stuff". Weldon compared the show to Critical Role and highlighted that the cast is "sketch and improv comedians. While the folks at Critical Role are often very funny, they're actors. ... At Dimension 20, if they can go for a joke, they're going to go for the joke, and that might line up closer to my sensibility". Moises Taveras, for Paste in 2023, also highlighted the improvisational nature of the show and how the game mechanics of dice rolls "sets Dimension 20 apart from the rest of TV". Taveras stated that "I can't predict a thing that's going to happen thanks to the insanely successful marriage of this mechanic to the cast's improvisational skills. There's nary a moment, whether it be a rousing victory or an utter defeat, that doesn't propel these characters forward in some way and carve out a unique, player-driven story. And because they are improvised rather than written, the characters feel like authentic people, even if they are fanciful in nature".

In 2023, Lauren Coates of Polygon highlighted how the anthology format allows Dimension 20 to reinvent itself and span "a vast variety of genres, styles, and tones" with their seasons "consistent in their ability to deliver across comedic, narrative, and emotional fronts". Coates commented that "as funny as the series is, it isn't just Dimension 20's sense of humor that makes it so beloved; it's the consistently heartfelt, poignant storytelling that accompanies it. There's incredible emotional depth to each new world of Dimension 20, as players and game masters collaboratively craft thoughtful, absorbing arcs tailored to each player and character". In 2024, Christopher Cruz of Rolling Stone opined that "one of the most unique aspects of Dimension 20 is the creative way in which they frame their campaigns" and that "the unique pop cultural spins on each story that push the diversity of storytelling, with many campaigns functioning as parodies of famous fantasy classics". Cruz also highlighted that it is not only "the familiar narrative hooks" which make the show "so accessible" but also "its strong focus on diverse voices and socially relevant themes woven into the framework. Cast members and characters feature representation across the BIPOC and LGTBQ communities and stories told are often deeply personal and affecting".

=== Campaign reviews ===
Academic Emma French, in an essay on The Unsleeping City campaigns, explained that the players are "explicitly 'heroes,' not 'adventurers'", who defend their home of New York City (NYC) – Mulligan's fictional NYC is similar to the real world but it also has "innate magic, powered by the diversity of the city's residents and, conversely, their lack of sleep, resulting in a surplus of powerful dream energy. Mulligan's worldbuilding stresses the power of a diverse but overworked and atomised urban population, literalising contemporary American social issues through fantasy". She highlighted Mulligan's use of "supernatural threats" which "upset intrusion fantasy's inherent paradigm, even as they utilise its structural techniques", and noted that "the enemies the heroes face are always tied back to a particular kind of status quo: they embody established facts of 20th and 21st Century USA". French stated that the worldbuilding by Mulligan "supports the reading of modern life as disillusioned and disenchanted—somewhat paradoxically, for an urban fantasy which ascribes fantastical power to disillusionment itself" and Mulligan's subversion of the intrusion fantasy framework is an argument "that the established status quos of the 21st century should not be defended from chaos and disruption, but instead acknowledged as corrupted, then challenged and overturned". French also highlighted that the "cast's performance of compassion and resistance, with Mulligan's authorial endorsement, shapes the plot towards a hopepunk resolution to the disenchantment represented through Mulligan's worldbuilding".

Justin Carter, in a review of A Starstruck Odyssey for Gizmodo, stated that "the consistency with which Dimension 20 shakes things up has helped give it a different kind of longevity compared to some of its fellow actual play titans, and each season ... is able to feel like a natural part of the franchise while also its own distinct thing". Carter highlighted that "several of the season's best events are too good to spoil, but every episode has at least two moments of incredible, often hilarious roleplaying from the cast. ... Starstruck's blend of strange humor and character drama feels a little bit more reined in than some earlier seasons and not prone to bits that could admittedly go on a little longer than necessary". Carter commented that this season has an infectious joy to it and that it takes the "fun to new, cosmic heights".

Rowan Zeoli, in a review of Dungeons and Drag Queens for Polygon, commented that the season "embraces the LGBTQ+ community in no uncertain terms" and that "in a time when the LGBTQ+ community is under constant attack, Dungeons and Drag Queens is a beacon of nerdy, queer joy". Zeoli highlighted that the cast "experiences the range of emotions your first D&D campaign can evoke" with the season offering "an easy and entertaining access point for queer people who have never felt safe entering D&D's complex (and occasionally infuriating) world of rules, lore, and role-play. One could watch these four episodes, along with a few episodes of Adventuring Party, and walk away with a basic grasp of the game".

=== Accolades ===
Year	Award	Category	Recipient(s)	Result	Ref.
2019	Webby Awards	Video Series & Channels – Games	Fantasy High	Honoree	
2025	Queerty Awards	Best Web Series	Dungeons and Drag Queens	Won	
2026	Gayming Awards	Queer Geek Entertainment of the Year Award	Dungeons and Drag Queens Season 2	Won	
