= Tween Fest =

- Genre: Comedy
- Created by: Nick Ciarelli; Brad Evans
- Starring: John Michael Higgins; Joey King; Drew Tarver; Arden Cho; Lou Wilson
- Country of origin: United States
- Original language: English
- No. of seasons: 1
- No. of episodes: 8

Production
- Executive producers: Mike Farah; Joe Farrell; Joe Hardesty; Nick Ciarelli; Brad Evans; Scott Gairdner; Reg Tigerman
- Camera setup: Single-camera
- Running time: 11 minutes
- Production company: Funny or Die

Original release
- Network: go90
- Release: August 3 – September 14, 2016

Tween Fest is an American comedy series produced by Funny or Die for the streaming service go90. The series, created by Nick Ciarelli and Brad Evans and directed by Scott Gairdner, follows a two-weekend outdoor festival for internet stars that descends into chaos. It stars John Michael Higgins, Joey King, Drew Tarver, Arden Cho, and Lou Wilson, with guest stars including Jane Lynch, Tim Meadows, Chris Parnell, David Koechner, and more. Tween Fest officially premiered on August 3, 2016.

== Cast ==
=== Main ===
- John Michael Higgins as Todd Crawford
- Joey King as Maddisyn Crawford
- Drew Tarver as Zayden Ostin Storm
- Arden Cho as Lexii C.
- Lou Wilson as Dusty DelGrosso

=== Recurring ===
- Jane Lynch as Sophia Sharp
- Dave (Gruber) Allen as Twonkmaster Chris
- Josie Totah (Note: Credited as J.J. Totah; the series was released before Totah came out as transgender.) as Stop the Preston
- Mike Mitchell as Rocco
- Nick Mundy as Donny
- Michael Blaiklock as Riley
- Natalie Palamides as Juicetine

=== Guest stars ===
- Tim Meadows
- Chris Parnell
- David Koechner
- Josh Fadem
- George Basil

== Episodes ==
No.	Title	Directed by	Written by	Original release date	Prod. code
1	"Tween Fest Begins"	Scott Gairdner	Nick Ciarelli & Brad Evans	August 3, 2016	101
2	"The Tubey Awards"	Scott Gairdner	Nick Ciarelli & Brad Evans	August 3, 2016	102
3	"Swag Strike"	Scott Gairdner	Nick Ciarelli & Brad Evans	August 10, 2016	103
4	"Congressman-Ass Bitch"	Scott Gairdner	Nick Ciarelli & Brad Evans	August 17, 2016	104
5	"The Week Between"	Scott Gairdner	Nick Ciarelli & Brad Evans	August 24, 2016	105
6	"Vape Battle of the Century"	Scott Gairdner	Nick Ciarelli & Brad Evans	August 31, 2016	106
7	"Australia's Rowdiest Prank Group"	Scott Gairdner	Nick Ciarelli & Brad Evans	September 7, 2016	107
8	"#SpurgeExplosion"	Scott Gairdner	Nick Ciarelli & Brad Evans	September 14, 2016	108

== Awards and nominations ==
Year	Award	Category	Nominee(s)	Result	Ref.
2017	Emmy Award	Outstanding Actor in a Short Form Comedy or Drama Series	John Michael Higgins	Nominated	
