= Kids on Bikes =

Tabletop role-playing game

- Designers: Jonathan Gilmour and Doug Levandowski
- Publishers: Hunters Entertainment; Renegade Studios
- Genres: tabletop role-playing game, adventure

Kids on Bikes is a tabletop role-playing game system, and a series of games that use that system. It has won multiple ENNIE Awards.

== Publication history ==
The first game in the series, Kids on Bikes, was inspired by 1980s coming-of-age movies like The Goonies. In 2022, the second edition of Kids on Bikes raised $182,049 on Kickstarter from 2,793 backers.

There are three other games in the series: the space-themed Teens in Space, a game about a school for wizards and witches called Kids on Brooms, and a forthcoming superhero game called Kids in Capes. On February 10, 2023, the designers held a charity sale of Kids on Brooms with all profits donated to transgender rights organization Sylvia Rivera Law Project. This was part of a larger boycott movement against Hogwarts Legacy due to the anti-transgender activities of author J. K. Rowling.

== Reception ==
Kids on Bikes won the 2019 Gold ENNIE Awards for Best Family Game / Product, and Kids on Bikes: Strange Adventures! Volume Two won the same award in 2020. Cass Marshall for Polygon recommended it for fans of Stranger Things.

Rachel Johnson of CBR recommended Kids on Brooms for fans of the Harry Potter series, lauding it for its accessibility to tabletop players old and new. Dicebreaker also had praise for the game's flexible spellcasting system. Polygon called it one of the best tabletop role-playing games of 2022, calling out its character creation process for creating interesting relationships and rumors.

== Gameplay ==
Kids on Bikes character creation involves assigning standard roleplaying dice to each of six stats. Unlike traditional DnD, where players roll a 20-sided die and then add a modifier based on their character's skill in a given category, the number of sides of each die correlates to the character's skill in each statistic. When a player rolls the maximum value on one of their dice, they are allowed to roll again, and add the result of the next roll. Players and gamemaster construct the setting together.

The game features a mechanic to allow for a "powered" character like those from E.T. and Stranger Things. While Powered characters are similar to non-player characters, players are able to exhibit some narrative control over the actions these characters take.

== In popular culture ==
The Kids on Bikes system has been featured on multiple seasons of the actual play series Dimension 20, including Misfits and Magic using Kids on Brooms, Mentopolis using "a 'noir-ified' version of Kids on Bikes", and Never Stop Blowing Up using a system "heavily inspired by" Kids on Bikes.

Dropout, publisher of Dimension 20, later released a four-page version of the Never Stop Blowing Up rules system. Christian Hoffer of EN World notes the system is intended to create "action movie-style" stories with "outlandish" action.
