= Aabria Iyengar =

American role-playing game web series actress

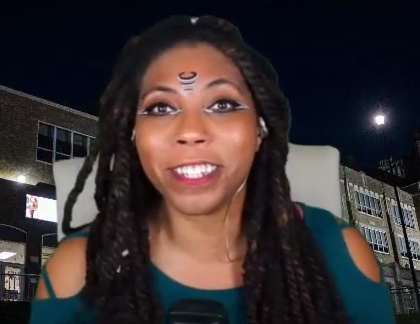
- Iyengar in Monsterhearts, 2021
- Born: Aabria Lipscomb; May 11, 1985 (age 41)
- Occupations: Actress, game master, chief marketing officer (formerly)
- Years active: 2018-present
- Known for: Worlds Beyond Number; Dimension 20; Exandria Unlimited; Critical Role

Aabria Iyengar (/əˈbriːə ˈaɪɛŋˌɡɑːr/ ə-BREE-ə EYE-en-gar; née Lipscomb; born May 11, 1985) is an American web series actress known primarily for tabletop role-playing game anthologies, streams and podcasts.

Iyengar is one of the creator-owners of the actual play podcast Worlds Beyond Number. She was the Dungeon Master (DM) for the first season of Exandria Unlimited. Iyengar has been both a player and a Game Master for multiple seasons of Dimension 20 and a guest DM on The Adventure Zone. She also joined the main cast of Critical Role as a player in the fourth campaign.

== Career ==
Iyengar is the former chief marketing officer for the dice-maker Dice Envy.

=== Actual play ===
Iyengar appeared as both a player and as the Dungeon Master (DM) in multiple actual play podcasts between 2018 and 2020 on the Happy Jack's RPG Network. Iyengar was originally a guest player, acting as Laura Bennett, in the actual play web series Kollok: 1991 on the Hyper RPG Twitch channel before joining the main cast in the second season in 2019. In 2022, Iyengar reprised her role in the sequel set 30 years after the first show – Kollok was broadcast on AMC Networks' FearHQ Twitch channel. Iyengar has been part of the main cast, playing as Koseh, for Into the Mother Lands since 2020.

In 2021, Iyengar was the DM for two actual play anthology web series – Misfits and Magic, the tenth season of Dimension 20, and the first season of Exandria Unlimited, a spin-off of Critical Role. She was the first Critical Role DM after Matthew Mercer outside of one-shots. Chase Carter, for Dicebreaker, stated that "both appearances were hits within their respective fandoms, leading many to clamor for more Iyengar". Iyengar also performed as a guest DM on The Adventure Zone, with the McElroy Brothers as players, in 2021. Christian Hoffer of ComicBook.com highlighted that "Iyengar has quickly built a reputation and fanbase due to her fantastic storytelling and rapport with players". Carter commented that "Iyengar is quickly becoming a household name in the realm of tabletop actual play. [...] Her fame has been a welcome change for many who are glad to see a Black woman garnering so much respect and excitement in what has been a predominantly white endeavor within a historically white hobby". Iyengar gave the Storytime keynote at the 2021 PAX Unplugged.

In August 2022, Iyengar appeared as gamemaster on Dimension 20: A Court of Fey & Flowers, a combination of Dungeons & Dragons and the Jane Austen-inspired game Good Society. She also joined the cast of the Vampire: The Masquerade web series NY by Night, playing as Margot "Fuego" Walker. Em Friedman, for Polygon in 2022, commented that Iyengar's actual play credits now "span nearly the entire industry" with her By Night debut.

In January 2023, it was announced that Iyengar, alongside Erika Ishii, Lou Wilson, and Brennan Lee Mulligan, would star in the creator-owned actual play podcast Worlds Beyond Number; the show premiered in March 2023 and ranked in Patreon's top twenty accounts within a month. Also in March 2023, Iyengar joined the third campaign of Critical Role as a guest star playing as gnome cleric Deanna. In November 2023, Iyengar joined Candela Obscura as the third chapter's game master. Iyengar returned to Dimension 20 as the gamemaster for Burrow's End in 2023 and the second season of Misfits and Magic in 2024. This was the anthology's first Side Quest campaign to receive a sequel season. Duncan Butcher for Polygon opined that "particular credit needs to go" to Iyengar as "her use of props, projections, and battle maps across her Dimension 20 seasons has consistently pushed what the medium is capable of". Also in 2024, Iyengar was a guest star in the stage production of Dungeons & Dragons: The Twenty-Sided Tavern which combines actual play, improv, and immersive theater at Stage 42 in New York City.

In 2025, she reprised her player role in The Twenty-Sided Tavern before acting as the show's first guest Dungeon Master; in August 2025, she also guest starred during the U.S. national tour in Chicago. Following the delay in filming the third season of NY by Night, Iyengar and some of the other cast members formed the Project Ghostlight group to create their own independent and non-official World of Darkness actual plays. Iyengar stars in Private Nightmares, Project Ghostlight's first show which premiered in March 2025. Also in 2025, Iyengar joined Critical Role's main cast for the fourth campaign which premiered in October 2025.

=== Writing ===
Iyengar contributed to the Critical Role sourcebook Tal'Dorei Campaign Setting Reborn (2022). Iyengar also contributed a short story in the anthology Critical Role: Vox Machina–Stories Untold (2025).

Iyengar is the writer, with artist Mari Costa, on the comic series The Fade; the first issue was published by Boom! Studios in November 2024. In June 2026, it was announced that Iyengar and Louangie Bou-Montes were the co-authors on the upcoming romantasy novel Rogue x Gambit (An X-Men Love Story); it is scheduled to be published by Marvel and Random House Worlds on February 9, 2027.

== Personal life ==
Iyengar, born Aabria Lipscomb on May 11, 1985, attended the University of Iowa where she was a member of their Division I volleyball team. She also attended the University of California, Los Angeles where she competed for the UCLA Bruins track and field team.

Iyengar first played Dungeons & Dragons in 2015 or 2016 when she was invited to her now husband's board game group and was given a cleric character sheet to play. Wired highlighted that "Iyengar was often the only woman or person of color at the table, and she faced a lot of other players questioning her knowledge of the game, as well as more overt harassment. As a GM, she now works to ensure her players don’t have to face those same challenges. [...] With the increased visibility of actual play games, [...] Iyengar has increasingly been able to tailor her playing experience to what she wanted it to be for both herself and her audience". In April 2023, WizKids announced a new miniature boxed set of Exandria Unlimited characters including a figurine of Iyengar.

In 2026, Iyengar had a child.

== Filmography ==
=== Web series ===
| Year | Title | | Role | Notes | Ref. |
|---|---|---|---|---|---|
| 2018–2020 | Happy Jacks RPG | Revelations | Thaïs Guillory | Main role; 10 episodes | |
| 2018–2020 | Happy Jacks RPG | Dragon Heist | Dungeon Master | Main role: 12 episodes | |
| 2018–2020 | Happy Jacks RPG | The Autumn People | Khairyn Antwi | Main role; 14 episodes | |
| 2018–2020 | Happy Jacks RPG | Monsoon | The Arcane / Science Pantheon / Child of A.I. | Main role; 9 episodes | |
| 2018–2020 | Happy Jacks RPG | Idolon Academy | Tendai Collier aka "Eye" | Main role; 16 episodes | |
| 2019 | Wildcards | East Texas University | Renee Billings | Episode: "The Seekers of Danger" | |
| 2019–2020 | Saving Throw | Urban Shadows RPG | Game master | One-shot | |
| 2019–2020 | Saving Throw | Frozen & Dragons | Elsa | One-shot | |
| 2019–2020 | Saving Throw | Mysterium: Hidden Signs | Esme | Limited series; 3 episodes | |
| 2019–2020 | Saving Throw | Ghosts of Saltmarsh | Dungeon Master | Limited series; 3 episode prequel to Pirates of Salt Bay | |
| 2019–2020 | Saving Throw | Pirates of Salt Bay | Dungeon Master | Main cast; 40 episodes | |
| 2019–2020 | RPG Exploration Society | | Amaka, Sonny | Episode: "Shadow of the Demon Lord", Episode: "Alien RPG" | |
| 2019–2022 | Kollok | 1991 | Laura Bennett | Guest role in season 1; main cast in season 2 | |
| 2019–2022 | Kollok | —N/a | Laura Bennett | Main cast Sequel set 30 years after Kollok: 1991; sometimes billed as season 3 | |
| 2020–2021 | New Pantheon | Demigods | Megan, Demigod of Ares | Main cast; 19 episodes | |
| 2020–2021 | New Pantheon | Academia | Helen Silva, Divinity Thoth | Episode: "S1E6" | |
| 2020–2021 | Tales from Salt Bay | Engine Heart | Ticky-Nicky Prizebot | Limited series; 2 episodes | |
| 2020–2021 | Tales from Salt Bay | Good Society | Rosaline Wildingham | Limited series; 4 episodes | |
| 2020–2021 | Tales from Salt Bay | Monsterhearts 2 | Hester Blake | Limited series; 2 episodes | |
| 2020–2021 | Roll20 Presents | Lost Mine of Phandelver | Witkha | Main cast; 14 episodes Sponsored by Wizards of the Coast to promote the Starter Set on Roll20 | |
| 2020–2021 | Roll20 Presents | Rime of the Frostmaiden | Bursa | Main cast; 13 episodes Sponsored by Wizards of the Coast to promote the Icewind Dale: Rime of the Frostmaiden module on Roll20 | |
| 2020–2022 | Into the Mother Lands | | Koseh | Main cast | |
| 2020–2023 | Failed Save | Campaign 1 | Fess / Zhirryn | Guest role in season 1; main cast in seasons 2-3; 31 episodes | |
| 2020–2023 | Failed Save | Campaign 2 | Chi | Main cast; 30 episodes Also appeared in vignette mini-episodes and spin-off one-shots | |
| 2020–2023 | Failed Save | Fantasy TGIFridays | Chi | Limited series; 3 episodes | |
| 2020–2024 | Dimension 20 | Pirates of Leviathan | Myrtle | Main cast; 6 episodes | |
| 2020–2024 | Dimension 20 | Misfits and Magic | Game Master | Main cast; 17 episodes | |
| 2020–2024 | Dimension 20 | The Seven | Antiope Jones | Main cast; 10 episodes | |
| 2020–2024 | Dimension 20 | A Court of Fey and Flowers | Game Master | Main cast; 10 episodes | |
| 2020–2024 | Dimension 20 | The Ravening War | Karna Solara | Main cast; 6 episodes | |
| 2020–2024 | Dimension 20 | Burrow's End | Game Master | Main cast; 10 episodes | |
| 2021 | The Adventure Zone | The Zone of Adventure: Imbalance | Dungeon Master | Limited series; 3 episodes | |
| 2021 | Gods of Metal: Ragnarock | | Val Cano | One-shot | |
| 2021 | Total Puppet Khaos | | Neve | Season 2 main cast; 3 episodes | |
| 2021 | A Very Pet Adventure | | Hygge | Main cast; 13 episodes | |
| 2021–2022 | Exandria Unlimited | —N/a | Dungeon Master | Main cast; 8 episodes | |
| 2021–2022 | Exandria Unlimited | Kymal | Dungeon Master | Main cast; 2 episodes Continuation of the first season | |
| 2021–2022 | Exandria Unlimited | Calamity | Laerryn Coramar-Seelie | Main cast; 4 episodes | |
| 2022 | NY by Night | | Margot "Fuego" Walker | Main cast; 8 episodes | |
| 2022 | The Borros Saga: Banesbreak | | Prythiv | Main cast; 12 episodes | |
| 2022 | Dark Souls: The Roleplaying Game | | Maerwyn | One-shot | |
| 2022 | Crypteens: A Cryptid Demigods Adventure | | Game Master | One-shot | |
| 2022 | Ten Candles: Devil in the Details | | Blythe Freeman | One-shot | |
| 2022 | Ms. Pixel's Fantastical Circus: Call of Cthulhu | | Lenore Reilly | One-shot | |
| 2022 | D&D Chaos | | Dungeon Master | Main cast; 3 episodes Roll20 series using the Strixhaven: A Curriculum of Chaos module | |
| 2023 | Salt & Serpent | | Dis | Main cast; 4 episodes | |
| 2023 | Pixel Circus Pride One-Shot | | Tricia | One-shot | |
| 2023 | Barbies For Better Pay | | 1996 Happy Holidays Barbie | One-shot | |
| 2023 | Faster, Purple Worm! Kill! Kill! | | | Guest role; 2 episodes | |
| 2023–2024 | Candela Obscura | Chapter 3: "The Circle of Tide & Bone" | Game Master | Main cast; 3 episodes | |
| 2023–present | Critical Role | Campaign Three | Deanna Leimert, Dungeon Master | Guest role; 10 episodes | |
| 2023–present | Critical Role | Campaign Four | Thaisha Lloy | Main cast | |
| 2023–present | Worlds Beyond Number | The Children's Adventure | The Wizard | Main cast Patreon exclusive prequel podcast for The Wizard, the Witch, and the Wild One | |
| 2023–present | Worlds Beyond Number | A Country Affair | Phillip the Goat | Main cast; 2 episodes | |
| 2023–present | Worlds Beyond Number | Space Cram | Game Master | Main cast; 2 episodes Patreon exclusive | |
| 2023–present | Worlds Beyond Number | The Wizard, the Witch, and the Wild One | The Wizard | Main cast | |
| 2023–present | Worlds Beyond Number | Interlude: Twelve Brooks | Lia | One-shot Patreon exclusive | |
| 2023–present | Worlds Beyond Number | Hint! | Ms. Whyte | One-shot; 4 episodes | |
| 2023–present | Worlds Beyond Number | Flight of the Icharon | Kiki Davis | One-shot; 5 episodes | |
| 2023–present | Worlds Beyond Number | Solari | Game Master | Main Campaign | |
| 2024 | An Astarion and Karlach Adventure: Love is a Legendary Action Live at GenCon2024 | | Dungeon Master | One-shot | |
| 2025 | Adventures in Faerûn: Tears of Selûne | | Dungeon Master | One-shot | |
| 2025–present | Game Changer | | Herself | 4 episodes | |
| 2025–present | Private Nightmares | | Katie | Main cast | |

=== Video games ===
| Year | Title | Role | Ref. |
|---|---|---|---|
| 2023 | Starfield | Crowd voices | |

=== Stage ===
| Year | Title | Role | Venue | Ref. |
|---|---|---|---|---|
| 2024–2025 | Dungeons & Dragons: The Twenty-Sided Tavern | Mage, Dungeon Master | Stage 42 | |
| 2025 | Dungeons & Dragons: The Twenty-Sided Tavern | Magic | Broadway Playhouse at Water Tower Place | |
