= Lou Wilson =

American actor, writer, and comedian

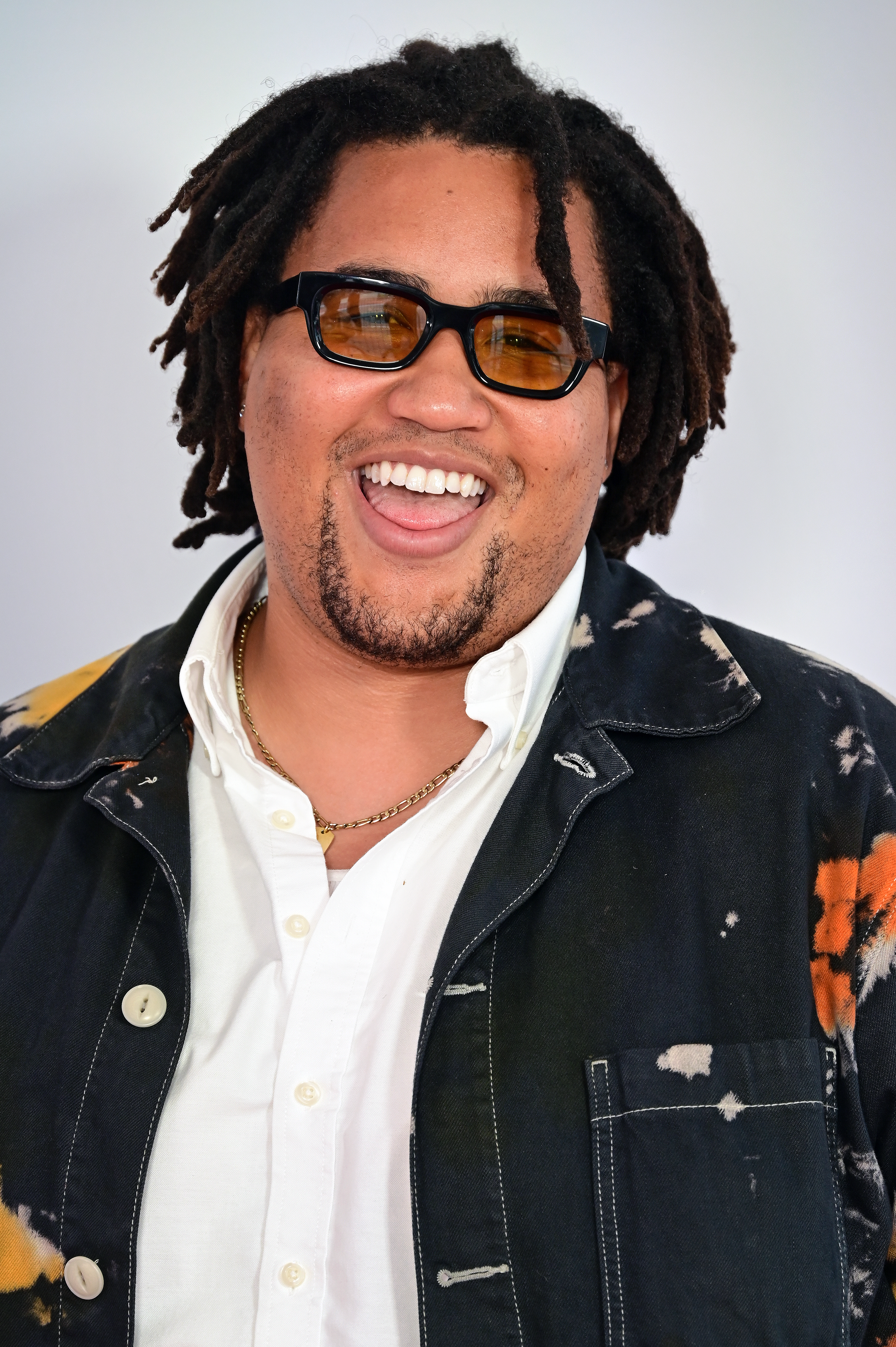
- Wilson in 2026
- Education: Boston College
- Occupations: Actor, comedian, screenwriter
- Known for: Jimmy Kimmel Live!, American Vandal, The King of Staten Island, Dimension 20

Zachery Lou Wilson is an American actor, writer, and comedian. He is best known for his work as a writer and his roles on actual play anthology web series Dimension 20 and the creator-owned podcast Worlds Beyond Number. He is also known for being the on-air announcer for Jimmy Kimmel Live! and his roles on American Vandal, The King of Staten Island, and The Guest Book.

== Early life and education ==
Wilson was raised in Altadena, California, and has lived in Los Angeles for the majority of his life. He attended Boston College and studied communications and Italian. While there, he became a member of the university's comedy troupe, My Mother's Fleabag. After his graduation in 2014, Wilson moved back to California and joined the Upright Citizens Brigade in Los Angeles.

== Career ==
In 2017, Wilson starred as Frank in The Guest Book and played Lucas Wiley on Netflix's American Vandal. Additionally, he acted alongside Pete Davidson in The King of Staten Island (2020), where he played the role of Richie. He began writing for Jimmy Kimmel Live! in 2020 and was promoted to on-air announcer in 2022, replacing Dicky Barrett after he retired.

Wilson is known within the tabletop role-playing game community as a primary cast member of Dimension 20, an actual play anthology web series which premiered in 2018; it was created by CollegeHumor for the streaming service Dropout. In 2022, he was a cast member of the actual play series Exandria Unlimited: Calamity, a spin-off of the web series Critical Role. In January 2023, it was announced that Wilson, alongside Erika Ishii, Aabria Iyengar, and Brennan Lee Mulligan, would star in the creator-owned actual play podcast Worlds Beyond Number; the show premiered in March 2023.

Wilson is also an improvisational comedian. He is currently a member of the improv troupe Yeti, which includes fellow Dropout cast members Zac Oyama, Ally Beardsley, Vic Michaelis, and Jacob Wysocki. Yeti performs at the Upright Citizens Brigade in Los Angeles.

== Filmography ==
=== Film ===
Year	Title	Role	Notes	Ref.
2018	Don't Worry, He Won't Get Far on Foot	Joseph-AA Member #2		
2018	Show Dogs	Caesars Security Guard		
2020	The King of Staten Island	Richie		

=== Television ===
Year	Title	Role	Notes	Ref.
2016	Tween Fest	Dusty DelGrosso	Main role	
2016	Comedy Bang! Bang!	Cashier	Episode: "Reggie Watts Wears a Purple and Yellow Quilted Sweatshirt"	
2017–2018	The Guest Book	Frank	Main role	
2017	American Vandal	Lucas Wiley	Recurring role	
2022–present	Jimmy Kimmel Live!	Himself (announcer)	Also writer	
2025	The Mighty Nein	Nydas Okiro (voice)	Episode: "Many Gifts"	

=== Web series ===
Year	Title		Role	Notes	Ref.
2018–present	Dimension 20	Fantasy High	Fabian Aramais Seacaster		
2018–present	Dimension 20	The Unsleeping City	Kingston Brown		
2018–present	Dimension 20	Fantasy High: Sophomore Year	Fabian Aramais Seacaster		
2018–present	Dimension 20	A Crown Of Candy	King Amethar Rocks		
2018–present	Dimension 20	The Unsleeping City: Chapter II	Kingston Brown		
2018–present	Dimension 20	Misfits and Magic	Whitney Jammer	Also appeared in the Misfits & Magic Holiday Special	
2018–present	Dimension 20	A Starstruck Odyssey	Gunthrie "Gunnie" Miggles-Rashbax		
2018–present	Dimension 20	A Court of Fey and Flowers	Lord Squak Airavis		
2018–present	Dimension 20	Neverafter	Pinocchio		
2018–present	Dimension 20	The Ravening War	Thane Delissandro Katzon		
2018–present	Dimension 20	Fantasy High: Junior Year	Fabian Aramais Seacaster		
2018–present	Dimension 20	Misfits and Magic: Season 2	Whitney Jammer		
2018–present	Dimension 20	Cloudward, Ho!	Montgomery LaMontgommery		
2018–present	Dimension 20	City Council of Darkness	LaVonte Worthy		
2018–present	Dimension 20	Toylight	Wyon		
2020–present	Game Changer		Himself	7 episodes	
2022	Exandria Unlimited	Calamity	Nydas Okiro	Anthology series; 4 episodes	
2023–present	Worlds Beyond Number	The Children's Adventure	Eursulon/The Wild One	Patreon exclusive prequel podcast for The Wizard, the Witch, and the Wild One	
2023–present	Worlds Beyond Number	The Wizard, the Witch, and the Wild One	Eursulon/The Wild One	Main cast	
2023–present	Worlds Beyond Number	A County Affair	Itsa Winnerbaby	Limited series; 2 episodes	
2023–present	Worlds Beyond Number	Space Cram: Reasonable Hoop Dreams	Slam Jamiels	Patreon exclusive podcast	
2023–present	Worlds Beyond Number	Flight of the Icaron	Game master	Limited series; 5 episodes	
2023–2025	Make Some Noise		Himself	4 episodes	
2025	Trauma Dump with Lou Wilson		"Himself"	Weekly "livestream"; 5 episodes + cast talkback	
