= Campaign (gaming) =

Continuing storyline in a game

A campaign is a continuing storyline in a game. In role-playing games, a campaign is a set of adventures. In video games, it may be a linked series of quests designed to tell a complete story.

== In role-playing games ==
A campaign in a tabletop role-playing game is characterized by the following:

- Rules – What underlying game system is used? What changes, additions, or subtractions has the game master made to the rules? How will the game master interpret those rules?
- Setting – Where do the adventures take place? What makes this world or place unique?
- Realism – Will the game try to closely simulate the real world? Or will unlikely or fantastic happenings be commonplace?
- Humor – Will the game be silly or comical? Or will it be serious and dark?
- Plot – Are the players a part of larger events? Not all campaigns have such a storyline, but most at least have recurring characters.

Differing emphasis on these factors sets the flavor of the campaign. A campaign, its characters, the settings, and its history, are created by players and the game master collaboratively.

== In video games ==
Campaigns with deep stories are typically found in single-player video games. Cooperative multiplayer video games may also have campaigns where players assist each other with a series of challenges or goals. Progressing through them together provides a coherent story. Campaigns in video games often incorporate cutscenes to tell the story, breaking up the game into alternating interactive and non-interactive sequences. In open world video games, campaigns usually consist of a series of linked quests that require players to travel to specific locations to continue the story. Players who dislike being forced to travel and complete specific quests may ignore the main story. In this sense, campaigns are the game's main story, as opposed to side quests. Heavily scripted video games that force players to progress linearly through the story may be called "on rails".

== Styles ==
- A hack and slash, kick in the door, or dungeon crawl campaign focuses on slaying monsters and finding treasure. This type of campaign is often very episodic. Many players of Dungeons & Dragons favor this type of campaign.
- A wargame campaign focuses on military and political activities, generally involving the affairs of fictional states. Miniature wargaming overlaps with role playing. Games Workshop started as a roleplay company, but through an analogous process, have transformed themselves into a miniatures manufacturing company with support material for entire fictional worlds – all to support their own role/miniature campaign concepts.
- A four color or superheroic campaign resembles comic books. Players are often given tasks, such as stopping supervillains, by their superiors.
- A detective campaign focuses on mysteries that must be solved by the players or that unfold as the game goes along. These may be ordinary crimes or paranormal mysteries. Some games, such as Call of Cthulhu, are designed specifically with supernatural campaigns in mind.
- Numerous variants of the above campaigns are created by the players. The exact nature of these variations are usually exposed by providing a descriptive prefix to the word campaign. For example: a villain campaign where the players are the bad guys or a kiddie campaign where the players' characters are still children.

== Other names ==
Some published games have deliberately used different terms for the same concept. For instance, White Wolf uses the word Chronicle for its World of Darkness and Exalted games. The Lego Group simply uses the word Story for its Lego video games.
