= AudioComics Company =

- Industry: Sound design
- Founded: 2010
- Website: audiocomicscompany.com

AudioComics Company is an audio production company that adapts comic books, graphic novels, and original works. It was founded in 2010, and expanded under the producers William Dufris, Lance Roger Axt, and Elaine Lee. Their productions have earned critical acclaim and awards in the United States and abroad, and have been cited as a "game changer" in the field of audio drama.

== Overview ==
"Beyond the great acting and great scripts and great comics they’re based on, we take a 'cinematic approach' to the production side of it all, which is why we call these productions 'audio movies' instead of audio dramas and audio plays or radio dramas."

— Lance Roger Axt on the approach of AudioComics Company.

The company produces full-cast audio adventures, based on licensed properties and original works from the world of comic books, graphic novels, and genre fiction, and distributes them by MP3, digital download, and CDs. The company has its origins in Play it by Ear Productions, an audio theatre company run by producer/writer/actor Lance Roger Axt to adapt original plays for radio and digital mediums. Producer/actor William Dufris, known as the voice of the cartoon character Bob the Builder, co-founded AudioComics Company with Axt in 2010 initially to adapt comics and graphic novels as audio productions, with full voice casts, sound effects, and musical scores.

Their first production in 2010 was an adaption of the science fiction spoof Starstruck, a stage play written by its director and star Elaine Lee and designed by illustrator Michael Wm. Kaluta. Lee wrote the new audio adaption, and participated in the voice cast along with her son, actor and comedian Brennan Lee Mulligan. After the success of this project, Lee joined Dufris and Axt as a co-producer in their successive productions.

Since 2010, the AudioComics Company has adapted comics projects like Starstruck, Titanium Rain, Molly Danger, Perhapanauts, and Locke & Key. They expanded to production of new stories of Pulp magazine characters like The Domino Lady in 2012; actor Karen Stilwell reprised this role in the 2013 adaption of Moonstone Comics' "Battle For LA", a team-up story starring other public domain heroes like The Black Bat, The Phantom Detective, Airboy, and Secret Agent X. They continued into new pulp fiction starring detective Honey West, adapted by Elaine Lee from a Moonstone Comics series she had created with artist Ronn Sutton. The company branched into original genre fiction with adaptations of Tom Kirkbride's young adult book Gamadin and Jeffery Deaver's thriller The Starling Project.

Production	Writer	Audio Adaptation	Director	Composer	Producer	Year
Starstruck	Elaine Lee	Elaine Lee	William Dufris	Dwight Dixon	William Dufris, Lance Roger Axt, Elaine Lee	2010
Horrorscopes	Poe, Bradbury, Lovecraft, etc.	William Dufris	William Dufris		Willam Dufris, Lance Roger Axt	2011
Titanium Rain	Josh Finney	Josh Finney	William Dufris	Jonathan Sharp	William Dufris, Lance Roger Axt, Elaine Lee	2012
Honey West: Murder On Mars	Elaine Lee	Elaine Lee	William Dufris		William Dufris, Lance Roger Axt, Elaine Lee	2012
The Domino Lady	Rich Harvey		Lance Roger Axt		William Dufris, Lance Roger Axt, Elaine Lee	2012
Battle For LA	C.J. Henderson	Lance Roger Axt	Lance Roger Axt		William Dufris, Lance Roger Axt, Elaine Lee	2013
Molly Danger	Jamal Igle	Lance Roger Axt and Elaine Lee	William Dufris	Frankie Schulmyer	William Dufris, Lance Roger Axt, Elaine Lee	2013
Gamadin	Tom Kirkbride	Elaine Lee	William Dufris	Mind's Eye Productions	William Dufris, Lance Roger Axt, Elaine Lee	2013
Perhapanauts	Todd Dezago	Todd Dezago and Elaine Lee	William Dufris		Willam Dufris, Lance Roger Axt, Elaine Lee	2013
The Starling Project	Jeffery Deaver	Jeffrey Deaver	Willam Dufris	Shockwave	Willam Dufris, Lance Roger Axt, Elaine Lee	2014
Locke & Key	Joe Hill	Elaine Lee and Fred Greenhalgh	Willam Dufris	Peter Van Riet	Willam Dufris, Lance Roger Axt, Elaine Lee	2015
The X-Files: Cold Cases	Joe Harris	Dirk Maggs	Willam Dufris	Mark Snow	Dirk Maggs, Willam Dufris, Lance Roger Axt, Fred Greenhalgh	2017

== Notable contributors ==
William Dufris, a noted voice actor (Spider-Man, Bob the Builder) and audiobook reader, has contributed Direction and Sound Design for the company, as well as co-production.

Lance Roger Axt, the director of Play it by Ear Productions, has written, directed, and co-produced.

Elaine Lee, an Emmy-nominated actor and writer of the Starstruck and Galactic Girl Guides comics series, has written and co-produced adaptations.

Illustrators Michael Wm. Kaluta and Lee Moyer have contributed new artwork as covers for adaptions.

Denise Poirier, the voice of Æon Flux, played the lead villain in the Starstruck audioplay.

Comics artist Jamal Igle (Supergirl) created artwork for the audio adaption of his creator-owned character, Molly Danger.

Alfred Molina (Raiders of the Lost Ark, Spider-Man 2) played the lead role in Jeffery Deaver's The Starling Project.

The adaption of Locke & Key, based on the horror comic series by writer Joe Hill and artist Gabriel Rodriguez, received widespread coverage noting the participation of actors Tatiana Maslany (Orphan Black), Haley Joel Osment (The Sixth Sense), and Kate Mulgrew (Star Trek: Voyager).

"Dufris sets up group recordings akin to old-time radio productions—but on steroids. He brings all the actors together in the studio and records the sessions in real time, rather than recording each reader individually and then piecing the tracks together later."

— Publishers Weekly

Contributor	Production or Role	Year
Elaine Lee	co-producer, writer, voice actor for AudioComics Company	2010-2015
Michael Wm. Kaluta	cover artwork for "Starstruck"	2010
Denise Poirier	performing in "Starstruck"	2010
Brennan Lee Mulligan	performing in "Starstruck" and "Locke & Key"	2010
Lee Moyer	cover artwork for "Honey West"	2012
Mark Sporacio	cover artwork for "Battle For LA"	2013
Jamal Igle	cover artwork for "Molly Danger"	2013
Tym Stevens	cover artwork for "Gamadin"	2013
Alfred Molina	performing in "The Starling Project"	2014
Haley Joel Osment	performing in "Locke & Key"	2015
Tatiana Maslany	performing in "Locke & Key"	2015
Kate Mulgrew	performing in "Locke & Key"	2015
Stephen King	uncredited cameo in "Locke & Key"	2015

== Awards and nominations ==
Since 2010 The AudioComics Company has received several award nominations and awards, most notably in 2013 when it was nominated for and won awards for its production of Titanium Rain. The company has also won noted industry awards for Honey West, Perhapanauts, and The Starling Project.

Award	Organisation/Year	Nomination	Win
Audie Award	Audio Publishers Association/ 2013	Best Audio Drama: Titanium Rain, Vol. 1	Nomination
Audie Award	Audio Publishers Association/ 2013	Best Original Work: Titanium Rain, Vol. 1	Nomination
Silver Mark Time Award	The American Society for Science Fiction Audio/ 2012	Titanium Rain, Vol. 1	Won
Earphones Award	AudioFile Magazine/ 2013	Titanium Rain, Vol. 1	Won
Communicator Award of Excellence in Audio	Communicator Awards/ 2014	Honey West: Murder on Mars	Won
Silver Ogle Award	The American Society for Science Fiction Audio/ 2013	Perhapanauts	Won
Earphones Award	AudioFile Magazine/ 2014	The Starling Project	Won

== Critical response ==
About the AudioComics Company adaption of Molly Danger, Major Spoilers wrote, "the creators did an excellent job of bringing the world of Molly Danger to life between the ears. There's solid acting from everyone." Geekquality wrote, "Olivia DuFord as Molly Danger manages to capture a perfect blend of childlike sweetness and sad world weariness that are to be expected from a 30-something living as an eternal pre-teen."

The Chicago Tribune wrote of The Starling Project, "this smart production makes full use of all that audio allows, employing actors who create distinctive voices" AudioFile Magazine wrote of the production, "With its hypnotic musical score and sound effects of gunshots, squealing tires, and all-too-close explosions, listeners may believe they're listening to a movie soundtrack."

Of the adaptation of Locke & Key, Paste Magazine wrote that the audioplay was "an immersive sonic experience brought to life by a top-flight cast of voice actors including genre icons Kate Mulgrew, Tatiana Maslany, and Haley Joel Osment." io9 wrote, "The production is a stunning adaptation." SFFaudio wrote, "it's a great story as a graphic novel, and this production successfully captures it, the flawless cast and rich sound adding a new and welcome dimension to the whole."
