= Lee Moyer =

American artist

- Born: Lee Moyer
- Areas: Writer, Penciller, Colourist
- Notable works: Starstruck; Starstruck Deluxe Edition Literary Pin-up Calendars

Lee Moyer is an American painter, illustrator, graphic designer, and web designer. Notable works include posters for musicians Tori Amos and Melissa Auf der Maur, as well as Laurel and Hardy paintings for the covers of their DVD box set collections, and the cover for the documentary Lovecraft: Fear of the Unknown.

== Biography ==
=== Early life and career ===
He worked for ten years as a Docent and Naturalist Illustrator at the Smithsonian Museum of Natural History.

He spent the early years of his career on the East Coast as Executive Producer at Digital Addiction and later an Art Director at Electronic Arts.

Moyer first worked with artist Michael Wm. Kaluta while working on a music video for the Alan Parsons Project's Don't Answer Me. In 2009, Kaluta and author Elaine Lee hired Moyer as colorist on their comic book series Starstruck. IDW released a remastered edition of the work that featured expanded art by Kaluta, and Moyer's new color art and designs. Moyer also colored the cover of the original cast recording Starstruck audio play CD from The AudioComics Company.

== Gaming industry ==
Moyer produced Dungeons & Dragons interior art from 2004-2013, including: Eberron Campaign Setting, Stormwrack, Player's Handbook, Dungeon Master's Guide, Draconomicon, and Martial Power.

He worked with game designer Keith Baker on the board game "The Doom That Came To Atlantic City". The project was mired in production problems that resulted in a Federal Trade Commission investigation that became the first federal crowdfunding prosecution. The game was published by Cryptozoic Entertainment in July 2013.

Moyer was the lead illustrator for "13th Age" and its expansion "13 True Ways".

== Notable works ==
Moyer painted The 2012 Literary Pin-Up Calendar for the charity Worldbuilders, which donates proceeds to Heifer International. It featured illustrations of classic authors. Another calendar was published in 2013 featuring modern fantasy authors. Moyer said that he enjoyed creating the works while "...riffing on the style of pin-up great George Petty."

In 2019, at the KEEP Contemporary Art Gallery in Santa Fe, NM, he helped create portraits of authors Seanan McGuire, Neil Gaiman, Octavia Butler, and N. K. Jemisin.

== Bibliography ==
=== Book covers ===
- Seanan McGuire. Imaginary Numbers. DAW, 2020. Tricks for Free. DAW, 2018.
- Joe Haldeman. The Best of Joe Haldeman. Subterranean Press, 2013.
- Caitlín R. Kiernan. Confessions of a Five-Chambered Heart. Subterranean Press, 2012. Two Worlds and In Between: The Best of Caitlín R. Kiernan (Volume One). Subterranean Press, 2011.
- Tad Williams. A Stark and Wormy Knight. Subterranean Press, 2012.
- Mark Hodder. A Red Sun Also Rises. Pyr, 2012.
- Michael Bishop. The Door Gunner and Other Perilous Flights of Fancy. Subterranean Press, 2011.
- Kim Newman. Mysteries of the Diogenes Club. MoneyBrain Books, 2010. Secret Files of the Diogenes Club. MonkeyBrain Books, 2007
- Jake McDevitt. Cryptic: The Best Short Fiction of Jack McDevitt. Subterranean Press, 2009.
- Philip José Farmer. Two Hawks From Earth. MonkeyBrain Books, 2009.
- Michael Swanwick. The Postutopian Adventures of Darger & Surplus Subterranean Press, 2020. The Best of Michael Swanwick. Subterranean Press, 2008. A Geography of Unknown Lands. Tigereyes Press, 1997.
- Edgar Pangborn. Davy. Old Earth Books, 2004.
- Iain M. Banks. The Algebraist. Night Shade Books, 2004.

=== Comics ===
- Starstruck: Remastered (IDW): color and design
- Starstruck: The Expanding Universe (Dark Horse): preface
- Galactic Girl Guides (IDW): color
- Starstruck Deluxe Edition, 2011 (IDW): color and design ISBN 0-88145-023-5
- Aquaman #51 (DC) cover color
- Zauriel #1 (DC) cover color
- Eberron: Eye of the Wolf (Devil's Due) cover color
- Honey West #3, 4, and 5. (Moonstone) cover
- Buckaroo Banzai: Return Of The Screw and Buckaroo Banzai: Origins cover
- Axe Cop: President of the World #1 (Dark Horse) cover color
