= Honey West (disambiguation) =

Honey West may refer to:

- Honey West, a fictional private detective from novels by Gloria and Forest Fickling
- Honey West (TV series), a 1965 TV series based on the character
- Honey West (comics), representations of the Honey West character in comics
