= Starstruck (play) =

1980 science fiction comedy play written by Elaine Lee

Starstruck: A Space Opera
- Original language: English
- Written by: Elaine Lee, with Susan Norfleet Lee and Dale Place
- Music by: Dwight Dixon
- Characters: Galatia 9, Brucilla the Muscle, Erotica Ann
- Subject: A Feminist sci-fi tribute
- Genre: Comedy
- Setting: Outer space, in the future

Premiere
- Date: April 16, 1980
- Place: N.E.T.W.O.R.K. Theater; New York City, New York

Starstruck is a 1980 science fiction comedy play written by Elaine Lee, with contributions from Susan Norfleet Lee and Dale Place. It was performed in New York City in 1980 and 1983, and spawned a graphic novel and comic book mini-series in 1984-85 and audioplays.

== Plot ==
In a distant future, humanity has spread across the stars. In the wake of a toppled galactic dictator, a period of freeform chaos exists with factions from every side vying for control. The United Federation of Female Freedom Fighters have sent Captain Galatia 9 and her compatriots to ensure the safety of Glorianna, a charismatic leader who may tip the balance toward a just society. But Glorianna has been kidnapped by the villains on the ship Siren 3, commanded by Galatia's lifelong nemesis, Verloona Ti. The struggle between the two ships and their eccentric crews will decide the future of the universe.

== Characters ==
- Captain Galatia 9: The swashbuckling captain of the Female Freedom Fighter ship, the Harpy.
- Brucilla the Muscle: The hotheaded mechanic, fighter, and pilot.
- Erotica Ann: The brilliant brain trapped in a sex droid body.
- Sister Bronwyn of the Cosmic Veil: A befuddled psychic nun.
- EEEEEEEEEluh: A merwoman empath.
- Verloona Ti: Leader of the villains, captain of the Siren 3.
- Kalif Bajar: A fallen aristocrat and schemer.
- Rah El Rex: A schizoid dandy.
- Orga the Killer Cyborg: A beast enslaved by Verloona.
- Norm: The computer for the Siren 3.
- Dwannyun: A villain wanna-be who tries out as Zun the Warlord, Grad the Illegible, and Captain Chaos.

== Background and creation ==
Elaine Lee earned a nomination in 1980 for the Daytime Emmy Award for Outstanding Supporting Actress in a Drama Series on NBC's soap opera The Doctors. She then created the Wild Hair production company in Manhattan as an outlet for stronger roles for female actors. With her sister, Susan Norfleet Lee, she co-wrote two plays that they produced and starred in with their company: "Brief Cases" and "The Contamination of the Kokomo Lounge".

The third play, "Starstruck: A Space Opera", was written by Elaine Lee, with dialogue contributions from Susan Norfleet Lee and Dale Place, as a parody and tribute to science-fiction cliches. Elaine Lee attributes the huge success of Star Wars, a lifetime of 50's and 60's science fiction movies, feminist science fiction novels, and a predominantly female cast as major influences on her approach to the script.

The Lee sisters met illustrator Michael Wm. Kaluta, who volunteered to do the poster. As the play came together, Kaluta also designed the costumes and sets, with some assistance from Fantasy artist Charles Vess.

While Elaine announced an intention to film the 1983 production on video, the main record of the two stage productions are photos by Sean Smith.

== Productions ==
=== 1980 production ===
The first Off Off Broadway production of "Starstruck" was at the N.E.T.W.O.R.K. Theater, from April 16-May 10, 1980.

The N.E.T.W.O.R.K. Theater production was co-directed by Ken Bush and Martha Lee. Kathy K. Gerber was the assistant director, with Choreography by Martha Lee; Set by Michael Wm. Kaluta and Mark Di Quinzio; Costumes by Michael Wm. Kaluta, with additional Costume and Prop Construction by Charles Vess; Music and Sound Effects by Dwight Dixon; and Lights by Mark Di Quinzio.

Cast

- Elaine Lee as Captain Galatia 9
- Susan Norfleet Lee as Brucilla the Muscle
- Karen Bebb as Erotica Ann
- Kathy K. Gerber as Sister Bronwyn of the Cosmic Veil
- Laurie Gittleman as EEEEEEEEEluh
- Sandra Spurney as Verloona
- Paul Ratkevich as Kalif Bajar
- Neal Ashmun as Rah El Rex
- Ruth Henderson as Orga the Killer Cyborg
- Paul Van Antwerp as The Great Disruptor; The Voice of Norm
- Joanne Joseph as The Great Mother
- Dale Place as Dwannyun/ Zun the Warlord/ Grad the Illegible/ Captain Chaos

Production notes Elaine Lee's portrayal of Galatia 9 and Susan Norfleet Lee's Brucilla the Muscle became immortalized by artist Kaluta as the characters' permanent likenesses in the ongoing comics series.

Kathy K. Gerber was assistant director as well as playing the addled nun, Sister Bronwyn.

=== 1983 production ===
The second "Starstruck" production was at the Park Royal Theater, from April 16-May 8, 1983.

The Park Royal Theater production was Directed by Elaine Lee, with Sets and Costumes by Michael Wm. Kaluta; Music and Sound Effects by Dwight Dixon; Lights by Adam Teichman and Earle Brokenshire; Video Segments by Bo Johnson; and Fight Choreography by Frank Lee.

Cast

- Gerry Martin as Captain Galatia 9
- Mary Lynn Hetsko as Brucilla the Muscle
- Karen Bebb as Erotica Ann
- Vicki Juditz as Sister Bronwyn of the Cosmic Veil
- Suzanne Parke as EEEEEEEEEluh
- Georgia Harrell as Verloona
- Paul Ratkevich as Kalif Bajar
- James Leach as Rah El Rex
- Wyatt Baker as Orga the Killer Cyborg
- Peter S. Feliz as The Voice of Norm
- Dale Place as Dwannyun/ Zun the Warlord/ Grad the Illegible/ Captain Chaos

Production notes In the second production, The Great Disruptor and The Great Mother were revised out of the script.

A song called "Those Crazy Stars" was added for Brucilla and Dwannyun to sing; the lyrics were by Elaine Lee and music by Dwight Dixon.

Karen Bebb, Dale Place, and Paul Ratkevich returned in their roles from the original production.

Karen Bebb's Erotica Ann became the template for the character's physical appearance in the comics, and by extension, also the appearance of Queen Glorianna.

Suzanne Park was a mime artist. Her movements to simulate the merwoman EEEEEEEEEluh's drifting in the water tank inspired Kaluta and Charles Vess to add more to the set for her to maneuver herself.

=== 2009 reading ===
On August 15, 2009, the Starstruck play was performed as a live reading in Big Sur, California, for a charity performance benefitting ailing comics artist Gene Colan. The reading was intended also as a rehearsal in preparation for an intended audioplay cast performance the following year.

In attendance were author Elaine Lee, colorist Lee Moyer, artist Brent Anderson, Karen Bebb Stillwell who originally played Erotica Ann, and Ruth Henderson Locke who originally played Orga the Killer Cyborg.

=== 2010 audioplay ===
The Starstruck play script was adapted as an audioplay in 2010, and recorded and released by The AudioComics Company.

The Starstruck audioplay production was adapted by Elaine Lee; Direction and Sound Design by William Dufris; Original Music and Arrangements by Dwight Dixon; Post Production by William Dufris and Anthony S. Marino; Engineered (for The Studio) by Efra Becerra-Avilez and Steve Drown; Recorded at The Studio, Portland, Maine; Produced by The AudioComics Company in association with Portland Community Radio WMPG FM.

Cast

- Tavia Gilbert as Captain Galatia 9
- Jennywren Sanders as Brucilla the Muscle
- Kristina Balbo as Erotica Ann
- Genevieve Casagrande as Sister Bronwyn of the Cosmic Veil
- Charly Duley as EEEEEEEEEluh
- Denise Poirier as Verloona
- Brent Askari as Kalif Bajar
- James Herrera as Rah El Rex
- Lance Roger Axt as The Voice of N.O.R.M.
- William Dufris as Dwannyun/Zun the Warlord/Grad the Illegible/Captain Chaos/Orga the Killer Cyborg
- Kym Dakin as E-V
- Evadne Bryan-Perkins as Gyndal Q
- Brennan Lee Mulligan as Jimmy the Snout
- Simon Vance as the Narrator

Production notes In the audioplay production, a new prelude set the background for the story and additional revisions were made to the main script for story clarity as a sound production. The prelude featured actor Brennan Lee Mulligan, Elaine Lee's son, as Jimmy the Snout, previously only seen in the comics. Elaine Lee explained about readapting the script: "The play was very visual and physical, lots of slapstick humor. It all had to be verbal for the audio version".

The villain leader Verloona was played by Denise Poirier, known for being the voice of Aeon Flux in the animated series.

The audioplay was the first time Dwight Dixon's original score could be heard by the mass public, outside of the first two-stage productions.

The Starstruck audioplay production recording was sold as a download and a double CD in October 2010.

The audioplay was also released to radio, where it was first broadcast by WMPG, Portland, Maine, on February 10 and 17, 2011.

The production was announced by the AudioComics Company as being the first in a series, with at least two new Starstruck audioplays to be written by Elaine Lee in the future. In April 2011, the second piece, "Running Scared", which focused on the origin of N.O.R.M. (from human to Siren 3 ship computer) was workshopped at the 30th Annual I-Con science fiction convention in upstate New York, featuring Poirier, Axt, and Mulligan from the original audio production. In addition, the New York-based comedy troupe Pink Axe played the Galactic Girl Guides, along with actors cast from auditions prior to and at the 2011 I-Con convention. The company plans to officially record the piece in the near future.

== Recording ==
The 2010 Starstruck audioplay production was made available for sale as MP3 downloads from iTunes, Amazon MP3, Amazon MP3 UK, CD Baby, ZBS, Napster, and AudioComics Digital Direct in October 2010. A double-disc CD was also made available through CD Baby and ZBS.

== Script ==
The Starstruck script was published by Broadway Play Publishing Inc., in March 1985, ISBN 0-88145-023-5 is now out of print. Michael Wm. Kaluta's poster was reproduced on the cover, as well as the six character pieces from the Starstruck limited edition portfolio supplemented by six new character pieces. A color section showcased Sean Smith's photos from both productions.

A revised version of the play was published in 2013 by Broadway Play Publishing Inc. with Michael Wm. Kaluta's artwork on the front and back covers.

== Portfolio ==
Michael Wm. Kaluta created portraits of six of the characters. These were published as a "Starstruck Portfolio" in 1980 as a limited edition of 2000, by Sal Q. Productions; the 11" × 14" works were printed in black-and-white, sealed in an envelope with a cover of the Starstruck stage play poster, and hand-numbered and autographed by Kaluta.

== Reception ==
The Starstruck play received coverage in the magazines Starlog (#41, December 1980) and Heavy Metal (#8311, November 1983), both featuring interviews with Lee and Kaluta, artwork, and Smith's photos.

The Starstruck audioplay has received favorable reviews in online articles. Audiophile Magazine called it "a swashbuckling feminist joyride" and praised its humor as "a raucous comedy that breaks all the rules". The Charleston Gazette wrote that it was "considerably more evolved than a traditional radio drama", and that its complexity meant that "jokes fly by so fast that repeated listenings will be warranted". Club Parnassus expressed their admiration of the subject matter saying "... if there’s a stage play out there featuring the wild and ribald adventures of four female space rangers, why is this not performed as often as The Sound of Music?" Audiophile, The Charleston Gazette, Club Parnassus, The Discriminating Fangirl, and Axiom's Edge each made favorable comparisons of the script and players to Douglas Adams' The Hitchhiker's Guide to the Galaxy.

== Prequels and sequels ==
A prequel series of Starstruck comics stories was created by Elaine Lee and Michael Wm. Kaluta detailing the backstories of the characters before the play. The first stories, written by Lee and illustrated by Kaluta, premiered in the adult Spanish SF anthology magazine, Ilustracion+Comix Internacional, in 1982. The stories were subsequently printed for the first time in America in Heavy Metal from 1982 to 1983. A collected graphic novel, Starstruck: The Luckless, Abandoned and Forsaked, was printed by Marvel Comics in 1984, followed by six new Starstruck issues in their Epic Comics line. These stories were extensively revised and expanded in the four-issue Starstruck: The Expanding Universe series from Dark Horse Comics in 1990. In 2009, IDW Publishing began remastering the Starstruck stories with newly expanded art by Kaluta and new color by painter Lee Moyer in a series of 13 issues, and a hardcover collected omnibus called the Starstruck Deluxe Edition was released on March 29, 2011 (ISBN 1-60010-872-5).
