= Galactic Girl =

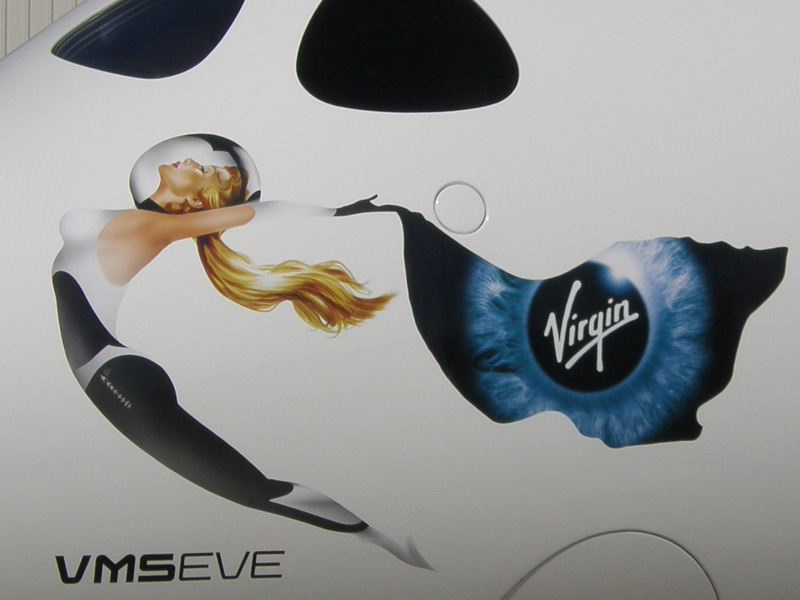
VMS Eve's nose art

Galactic Girl may refer to:

- An erotic science-fiction novel (1980) by Fiona Richmond
- The nose art of Virgin Galactic's mothership VMS Eve
- G-GALX, the private business jet of Richard Branson
- Based on comic stories by Elaine Lee and Michael Kaluta, first published in Dave Stevens Rocketeer Adventure Magazine and most recently collected in the Starstruck Deluxe Edition, The Adventures of the Galactic Girl Guides feature characters that the creators describe as “little con-artist girl scouts in space.”

== See also ==
- Galactic Girl Guides
