= Domino Lady =

The Domino Lady
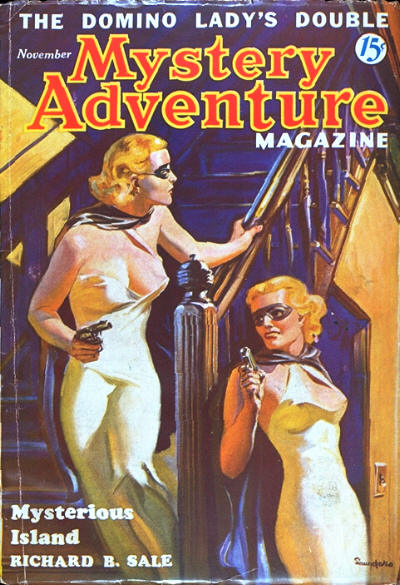
- Mystery Adventure, November 1936, art by Norman Saunders

Publication information
- Publisher: Fiction Magazines
- First appearance: Saucy Romantic Adventures (May, 1936)
- Created by: "Lars Anderson"

In-story information
- Alter ego: Ellen Patrick
- Abilities: None

The Domino Lady is a masked pulp heroine who first appeared in the May 1936 issue of Saucy Romantic Adventures.

New short stories and a comic book featuring The Domino Lady are currently being published by Moonstone Books and Airship 27 in various books, and Bold Venture Press in its new pulp fiction magazine Awesome Tales.

== Development ==
All of the Domino Lady stories were published under the house name "Lars Anderson" owned by the publisher, Fiction Magazines. The author's real identity is unknown.

Saucy Romantic Adventures was a "spicy pulp" magazine, a genre that typically featured semi-pornographic short stories. Though writers for these were paid less, the cover price was higher than that of a typical pulp magazine. This was due to a combination of smaller print runs and what the traffic would bear. Such magazines were usually sold "under the counter" upon request.

== Character ==
The Domino Lady is the alter ego of University of California, Berkeley-educated socialite Ellen Patrick. When her father, District Attorney Owen Patrick, is murdered she puts on a domino mask and a backless white dress to avenge him. She would arm herself with a .22 pistol strapped to her thigh and a syringe full of knockout serum, but often her best weapon was her beauty, which often distracted and entranced opponents, or at the very least led them to underestimate her, allowing her to outwit them. Such wiles rarely worked upon her female adversaries, however.

She steals from her targets, donating most of the profits to charity after deducting her cut, and leaves a calling card with the words "Compliments of the Domino Lady".

== Stories ==
=== Original adventures ===
1. The Domino Lady Collects (Saucy Romantic Adventures, May 1936)
2. The Domino Lady Doubles Back (Saucy Romantic Adventures, June 1936)
3. The Domino Lady's Handicap (Saucy Romantic Adventures, July 1936)
4. Emeralds Aboard (Saucy Romantic Adventures, August 1936)
5. Black Legion (Saucy Romantic Adventures, October 1936)
6. The Domino Lady's Double (Mystery Adventure Magazine, November 1936)

==== Reprints ====
Reprints of the original pulp magazines and individual stories have been made, such as in Pulp Collector Press' Pulp Review in 1992.

The Domino Lady stories have been reprinted in one volume, Compliments of the Domino Lady by Bold Venture Press, with cover artwork by Jim Steranko (ISBN 1-887591-70-2).

=== Modern adventures ===
Eros Comix have published a series of Domino Lady and Domino Lady's Jungle Adventure comics written by Ron Wilber. They were collected and reprinted in 1995 as Eros Graphic Album Series No. 19: Domino Lady (ISBN 978-1560972174).

In 2009 Moonstone Books published Domino Lady: Sex as a Weapon, a collection of eight new stories set in the 1930s and edited by Lori Gentile. Many stories involve the Domino Lady teaming up with other fictional characters like the Phantom and Sherlock Holmes.

In 2009 Moonstone also launched a comic book by Nancy Holder with art by Steve Bryant.

In 2015 Airship 27 published Domino Lady Volume One with stories by Tim Bruckner, Kevin Findley, Greg Hatcher and Gene Moyers. Illustrated by James Lyle. Cover by Fred Hammond.

2015 — "Pretenders to the Throne" by Rich Harvey, Awesome Tales magazine, issue #1, Bold Venture Press, 2015.

2015 — Domino Lady: Death on Exhibit by Rich Harvey, Bold Venture Press, 2015. The complete radio script (three episodes) of the Audio Comics Company's incomplete Domino Lady radio drama.

In 2016 Airship 27 followed up with Domino Lady Volume Two with tales by Kevin Findley, Brad Mengel, Gene Moyers, and Robert Ricci. Illustrated by James Lyle. Cover by Fred Hammond.

Also in 2016, Moonstone published Sherlock Holmes & Domino Lady, featuring comic stories and prose stories featuring both characters by Bobby Nash, Nancy Holder and James Chambers. Illustrated by Scott Vaughn. Cover by Mike Fyles.

2017 — Give Them a Corpse (Part 1) by Rich Harvey, Awesome Tales magazine, issue #6, Bold Venture Press, 2017.

2018 — Give Them a Corpse (Part 2) by Rich Harvey, Awesome Tales magazine, issue #9, Bold Venture Press, 2018.

In 2019 Airship 27 returned with Domino Lady Volume Three, with stories by Adam Mudman Bezecny, Gene Moyers, Brad Mengel, and Samantha Lienhard. Illustrated by James Lyle. Cover by Ted Hammond.

2020 - Moonstone Books published Gentlemen prefer Domino Lady, with eight stories written by assorted authors. Introduction by Nancy Holder.

2022 - Airship 27 published Domino Lady volume 4, with stories by Gene Moyers, Kelly Nolan, Kevin Findley and Samantha Lienhard. Cover by Ted Hammond and interior illustrations by James Lyle.

2024 - Airship 27 published Domino Lady volume 5 with tales by Gene Moyers, George Tackes, Gene Popa and Fred Adams Jr. Interior illustrations and cover by Warren Montgomery.

==== Audio ====
The AudioComics Company, an audio production company devoted to producing and distributing professional full-cast audio dramas adapted from independent comic books, graphic novels, webcomics, and the occasional prose work, announced in 2011 that they would be producing a series of Domino Lady stories as part of their "Pulp Adventures" line, marking the first time that the character has ever appeared on radio. The first episode, "All's Fair in War," written by Rich Harvey and directed by AudioComics co-founder Lance Roger Axt, was recorded in San Francisco in November 2011 starring Bay Area-based actor Karen Stilwell, the original "Erotica Ann 333" from the 1980s stage production of Starstruck, as Ellen Patrick/The Domino Lady. The work was released exclusively as an Mp3 digital download April 30, 2012, and is available for sale on iTunes.
