= Vamps (comics) =

Comic book limited series

Vamps is a comic book limited series (6 issues) by Elaine Lee and William Simpson published in 1994 to 1995. Two sequels series, Vamps: Hollywood and Vein (6 issues) and Vamps: Pumpkin Time (3 issues), were also released.

== Contents ==
Vamps is a story of five female vampires in modern times, which were all created to be servant "brides", and the group decides that they have had enough of this situation.

== Reception ==
Andy Butcher reviewed the Vamps graphic novel for Arcane magazine, rating it an 8 out of 10 overall. Butcher comments that "this is a well-crafted story, with some interesting new takes on one of our most popular myths. It's well worth a read".
