= Elaine Lee =

American writer and actor

- Occupations: Comic writer; actor; playwright; producer
- Notable work: Starstruck
- Spouse: Joe Mulligan
- Children: Brennan Lee Mulligan
- Website: elainelee.us

Elaine Lee is an American writer and actress, who specializes in graphic novels. She has also received recognition and awards for her work as a creator and producer of audio books and dramas.

Her comics have been illustrated by artists including Michael Wm. Kaluta, Charles Vess, James Sherman, Steve Leialoha, Linda Medley and John Ridgway.

Her graphic novel Starstruck: The Luckless, the Abandoned and Forsaked was nominated for a Jack Kirby Award as The Best Graphic Album of 1985.

She is the mother of Brennan Lee Mulligan, who is the author of Strong Female Protagonist and creator of Dimension 20.

== Career ==
In 1976, she moved to New York City and found acting work. In 1979, she landed the role of Mildred Trumble on NBC-TV's The Doctors.

She was a founding member and artistic director of Manhattan-based theatre company, Wild Hair Productions.

Wild Hair began its run performing three plays written and performed by Elaine Lee and her sister, comedian Susan Norfleet Lee: Brief Lives, The Contamination of the Kokomo Lounge, and Starstruck. Starstruck, a science-fiction spoof with a largely female cast, was performed Off-Broadway at the N.E.T.W.O.R.K. Theater, from April 16 – May 10, 1980. Lee portrayed Captain Galatia 9, and Susan Norfleet Lee played Brucilla the Muscle. In 1983, Lee directed a revised production with a new cast that was performed at the Park Royal Theater, from April 16 – May 8, 1983.

Lee's Starstruck play grew into a comic-book series that has been adapted into audioplays and seen multiple spin-offs and sequels. It was nominated for the Jack Kirby award for Best Graphic Novel in 1985. A critic writing for the British Science Fiction Society magazine Vector called it a "groundbreaking work" and said its nonlinear and adjacent storytelling were like those of the later Watchmen.

Lee is a writer and co-producer for The AudioComics Company, which adapts comics and other original works into full-cast dramatizations with scores and sound effects. She adapted Locke and Key, based on IDW's graphic novel series by Joe Hill and Gabriel Rodriguez. It was a finalist for an Audie Award. She also produced The Starling Project, which received Audie Award nominations for Original Work and Best Audio Drama, and an Earphones Award.

She co-adapted the Image Comic series The Perhapanauts which won a Silver Ogle Award, and also adapted and co-produced her "Honey West: Murder on Mars" (Moonstone Books) comics as an audioplay.

In 2011, Lee was chosen as an Artist in Residence at the National Audio Theatre Festival workshop. The NATF commissioned her play "TransMars Tango" for a live performance, starring Philip Proctor of The Firesign Theatre, and directed by Brian Price.

In comics, Lee has written a wide variety of works for Marvel, DC, Dark Horse and other publishers, including Indiana Jones and the Spear of Destiny, Prince Valiant, Ragman and Vamps. Lee worked as a colorist as well, most notably on several issues of The New Mutants and The Shadow for Marvel Comics and Dark Horse Comics and the first two issues of Starstruck. She also did color art and supervised art direction, did design work on her various Starstruck projects, such as the Starstruck Deluxe Edition, and for works on which she served as co-producer at AudioComics. She also served as Art Director for Stadium Entertainment.

== Bibliography ==
- Starstruck: The Audioplay a revised adaption of the original stage play. (2010)
- Starstruck: Running Scared, short play, created for a cast reading at I-CON 2011.

=== Comics writer ===
==== Caliber Press ====
- Negative Burn #6 (1993) (anthology story)

==== Dark Horse Comics ====
- Indiana Jones and the Spear of Destiny #1-4 (Apr.-Jul. 1995) (also colorist)
- Starstruck #1-4 (Aug. 1990—Mar. 1991)

==== DC Comics ====
- Ragman: Cry of the Dead #1

==== DC Comics/Helix ====
- BrainBanx #1-6 (Mar.-Aug. 1997)

==== DC Comics/Vertigo ====
- Vamps #1-6 (Aug. 1994-Jan. 1995)
- Vamps: Hollywood & Vein #1-6 (Feb.-Jul. 1996)
- Vamps: Pumpkin Time #1-3 (Dec. 1998-Feb. 1999)

==== Dynamite Entertainment ====
- Vampirella: Feary Tales #3 (Dec. 2014) (Vampirella anthology story)

==== Eclipse Comics ====
- Sabre #1-2 (Aug.-Oct. 1982) #2 (backup stories)
  - reprinted in Dark Horse Comics The Book of Night #1 (Jul. 1987)

==== Green Man Press ====
- The Book of Ballads and Sagas #4 (Jan. 1997) (anthology illustrated text story)
  - reprinted in Tor Books The Book of Ballads (hardcover 2004, softcover 2006)

==== IDW Publishing ====
- Starstruck: Old Proldiers Never Die #1-3 (Feb.-Apr. 2017)

==== Marvel Comics ====
- Prince Valiant #1-4 (Dec. 1994-Mar. 1995)
- Steeltown Rockers #1-6 (Apr.-Sept. 1990)

==== Marvel Comics/Epic Comics ====
- Epic Illustrated #11 (Dec. 1984), #27 (Dec. 1984) (anthology story)
- Marvel Graphic Novel #13 - Starstruck (Dec. 1984)
- Starstruck #1-6 (Feb. 1985-Feb. 1986) (also colorist #1-2)
- The Transmutation of Ike Garuda #1-2 (Jul. 1991-Jan. 1992)

==== Marvel Comics/Razorline ====
- Ectokid Unleashed #1 (Oct.1994) (text short story)
- Razorline: The First Cut #1 (Sep. 1993 series) (anthology story)
  - also published in Hokum & Hex #1 (Sep. 1993) (backup feature)
- Saint Sinner #1-7 (Oct. 1993-Apr. 1994)

==== Moonstone Books ====
- Honey West #3-5 (2011)

==== National Lampoon, Inc., J2 Communications, and Kevin Eastman ====
- Heavy Metal v.6 #8-11 (Nov. 1982-Mar. 1983), v.7 #3 (Jun. 1983) (anthology stories)
- Heavy Metal v.16 #2 (Jul. 1992) (anthology story)
- Heavy Metal v.19 #6 (Mar. 1993) (anthology story)

==== NBM Publishing/Amerotica ====
- Skin Tight Orbit #1-2 (1995) (anthology; all stories by Lee)

==== Red Giant Entertainment ====
- Giant-Size Fantasy #0 (2014) (anthology story)

=== Comics colorist ===
==== Comico: The Comic Company ====
- The Rocketeer Adventure Magazine #1-2 (Jul. 1988, Jul. 1989)

==== DC Comics ====
- The Private Files of the Shadow (Apr. 1989)

==== Marvel Comics ====
- Amazing Adventure #1 (1988)
- The Amazing Spider-Man #277 (Jun. 1986)
- The Avengers Annual #15 (1986)
- Classic X-Men #3-6 (Nov. 1986-Feb. 1987)
- Marvel Fanfare #34-37 (Sep. 1987-Apr. 1988)
- The New Mutants #42 (Aug. 1986), 44 (Oct. 1986)
- Star Wars #107 (Jul. 1986)

==== Marvel Comics/Epic Comics ====
- Steelgrip Starkey #1-3 (Jul.-Nov. 1986)

==== Marvel Comics/Razorline ====
- Hyperkind Unleashed! #1 (Sep. 1994)

==== Marvel Comics/Star Comics ====
- Misty #4-6 (Jun.-Oct. 1986)

==== Metro Comics ====
- Matt Champion #1 (1987)
