= Titanium Rain =

Limited series written by Josh Finney

- Cover of Titanium Rain Vol.1

Publication information
- Publisher: Archaia Studios Press
- Format: Limited series
- Genre: Military science fiction
- Publication date: July 2008 - present
- No. of issues: Issue 1 - [August] [2008] Double Size Issue 1 - October 21, 2009; Double Size Issue 2 - November 4, 2009; Vol.1 Hard Cover - April 21, 2010; Vol.2 Hard Cover - TBA

Creative team
- Written by: Josh Finney
- Artist(s): Josh Finney; Kat Rocha

Collected editions
- Vol.1 Hard Cover: ISBN 978-1-932386-72-1
- Vol.2 Hard Cover: ISBN 978-1-932386-93-6

Titanium Rain is a limited series published by Archaia Studios Press, written by Josh Finney, with art by Josh Finney and Kat Rocha.

== Plot ==
In the year 2031, a civil war in China has spiraled into global conflict. After the assassination of Chairman P'eng (China's supreme military leader), General Kao Shen of the PLA decides it's time for China to return to its former imperial glory and declares himself Emperor of China. The United States is pulled into the conflict when Kao Shen launches a sneak attack against Japan in an effort to goad the nation into war.

The story follows United States Air Force pilot, Alec Killian, and the other members of the 704th Phoenix Tactical Fighter Squadron stationed on the front lines of the conflict at Mamoru Air Base, a converted civilian airport located on Hainan Island.

== Characters ==
=== Phoenix Squadron ===
- 1st LT. Alec Killian
  - F35X HellcatII pilot for the US Air Force.
  - Call Sign - Space Case
- Captain William Schilling
  - F35X HellcatII pilot for the US Air Force.
  - Call Sign - PiSO
- 1st LT. Zoe Garland
  - F35X HellcatII pilot. Interservice Exchange Program, originally a member of RAF Scarab Squadron.
  - Call Sign - Happy
- Major Paul Graves

== Planes ==
The pilots of Phoenix Squadron the fly F-35X Hellcat II, a fictional variant of the Joint Strike Fighter. The Hellcat II has one major difference from the JSF in that it has forward-swept wings.

== Issues ==
Cover of Titanium Rain Issue 1

- Issue 1
  An introduction to the world and setting of Titanium Rain. Opens with United States Marines on the ground in a fire fight in China, and cuts to the introduction to Phoenix Squadron and an explanation of the conflict.

== Controversy ==
In 2010 book printers in China refused to print volume one of Titanium Rain due to "politically sensitive content." Later, it was revealed that the book was banned in China for the same reasons.

== In other media ==
In June 2011, the AudioComics Company announced plans to adapt Titanium Rain as an audio drama. The first volume of the trilogy was recorded in Portland, ME in November 2011 with creators Finney and Rocha in attendance. Directed by AudioComics Company co-founder William Dufris, the work featured co-founding Company member and actor Lance Roger Axt as Alec Killian, audio book narrator and cabaret singer Carrington MacDuffie as "Sky Eye," and British film actress Elizabeth Knowelden as "Happy." The Titanium Rain AudioComic was released on compact disc and pay-per-Mp3 download in May, 2012. In 2013, the work was nominated for two Audie Awards through the Audiobook Publishers Association in the categories of Best Audio Drama and Best Original Work. It also won the Earphones Award from AudioFile magazine and the Silver Mark Time Award.
