= Starstruck (comics) =

American sci-fi comic book series

- Starstruck #1, Epic Comics (February 1985).

Publication information
- Publisher: Heavy Metal, Epic Comics, Dark Horse Comics, IDW Publishing
- Format: Ongoing series
- Genre: Science fiction
- Publication date: April 1982 – November 1982 (Ilustracion+Comix Internacional); November 1982 – July 1983 (Heavy Metal); February 1985 – February 1986 (Epic); August 1990 – March 1991 (Dark Horse); August 2009 – September 2010 (IDW); Starstruck Deluxe Edition (hardcover 2011, softcover 2012 (IDW))
- No. of issues: 7 serialized stories (Ilustracion+Comix Internacional); 9 serialized stories (Heavy Metal); 6 (Epic); 4 (Dark Horse); 13 (IDW)

Creative team
- Created by: Elaine Lee, Michael Wm. Kaluta
- Written by: Elaine Lee
- Artist: Michael Wm. Kaluta
- Inker: (Galactic Girl Guides: Charles Vess)
- Letterer(s): Todd Klein; (Epic: Ken Bruzenak, John Workman)
- Colorist(s): Lee Moyer; (Epic: Elaine Lee, Steve Oliff)
- Editor(s): Archie Goodwin (Epic), Randy Stradley (Dark Horse), Scott Dunbier (IDW)

Collected editions
- Starstruck Deluxe Edition (2011): ISBN 978-1-60010-872-3

Starstruck is an American science fiction comic book series. It is based on the off-Broadway stage play of the same name written by Elaine Lee, with contributions from Susan Norfleet Lee and Dale Place. An audio drama was also published.

== Overview ==
Starstruck, in comics form, has been produced at various intervals since 1982 by writer Elaine Lee and artist Michael Wm. Kaluta; their primary collaborators are colorist Lee Moyer and letterer Todd Klein. The series, epic in scope, has been carried across multiple comic companies, amongst them Marvel Comics, Dark Horse Comics, and IDW Publishing. It was collected in a revised and recolored hardcover book form as Starstruck Deluxe Edition in 2011.

Since its inception, Starstruck has built a cult audience and critical acclaim from peers, periodicals, and fans for the sophistication of its storytelling. Most noted is the predominantly female cast, portrayed by Lee with a range and nuance that confounds gender stereotypes. Kaluta, an esteemed veteran of comics and illustration, is often commended for the virtuosity and imaginative detail of his artwork. Also, the series is cited for the progressiveness of its rich and complex structure: Starstruck preceded Watchmen in using innovations like nonlinear storytelling, overlapping dialogue, multiple story threads, back-up text, unreliable narrators, adjunct stories, underlying themes, recurring symbols, and an almost symphonic interconnectedness.

== Premise ==
The story is set in an anarchic future in which humanity spans the universe. The Dread Dictator has fallen and a power vacuum sparks a chess game of eccentric players scheming for control. The serio-comic stories follow Captain Galatia 9 and her running partner, Brucilla The Muscle, as they navigate madcap scenarios and surreal misadventures in between the galactic infighting.

== Play ==
Elaine Lee herself played the adventurous lead, Captain Galatia 9, while Lee's sister, Susan Norfleet Lee played her rowdy pilot, Brucilla the Muscle. Noted illustrator Michael Wm. Kaluta played a major role in visual aspects of the play, working on sets, costumes and promotional material. The story is set in the future, and features several strong female lead characters. A strange and gleefully corrupt future version of the Girl Guides, the Galactic Girl Guides, are introduced in a subplot that leads to the climax. The Starstruck play was produced in 1980, with another staging in 1983.

The script of the play (ISBN 978-0-88145-023-1) was published in 1985 and is still available. An audioplay adaption was recorded in 2010, and released on CD and download.

=== Background and creation ===
Elaine Lee was an actor in the late 1970s New York City theatre and television scene. She was nominated for a Daytime Emmy Award for her work on the long-running NBC soap opera The Doctors; she portrayed the troubled Mildred Trumble, a character modeled after Sissy Spacek's character, Pinky Rose from Robert Altman's film 3 Women. Seeing a lack of range and depth in the roles being offered to female actors, she formed a Manhattan theatre company with her sister, Susan Norfleet Lee, and actor friends which they called Wild Hair Productions. The Lees wrote their own plays for the company to star in, starting with Brief Cases.

During the writing of a second play, The Contamination of the Kokomo Lounge, Elaine began pulling together ideas for a science fiction play. The Lee sisters were at a Manhattan bar/cafe called The Library, discussing ideas over a pile of science fiction magazines when illustrator Michael Wm. Kaluta, a neighbor who often sketched there, approached them asking, "Are you science fiction fans?" Elaine kept his card for the future. Elaine Lee was subsequently impressed by seeing Kaluta's art in the West Side Comics store, on a poster showcasing The Studio, an art collective he shared with Barry Windsor Smith, Jeffrey Jones, and Berni Wrightson. Kaluta was impressed by the wit and range of their second play: he recalled thinking: "If they're going to do a science fiction play, they're going to do it very well".

Elaine Lee's first draft was on a stack of 5×7 index cards. Lee wrote all the drafts of the script, with some dialogue suggestions from Susan Norfleet and Dale Place. The quality of the material persuaded Kaluta to create the show poster. He became the costume designer after asking what costumes the actors would wear in the poster, and the set designer when the regular one got sick. Kaluta told an interviewer backstage about the evolution of his role: "Should it be like a real 1930s movie poster? That's when I realized I wanted to do characterizations of the entire cast on the poster. But, I had to know what they looked like. So that's when I started designing the costumes. Because I designed them so intricately, I had to build them. And that's when my house started looking like the garment district".

Starstruck was being created in the late 1970s period of New York City's decline, when poor musicians in Punk and free jazz were making a rising scene out of cheap rents, collective venues, and street throwaways. Kaluta said: "You could build an entire city on the stuff the city throws away, just sitting out there". The resulting sets, designed in the style of classic science fiction serials, used Hot Wheels tracks, walkie talkies, medical splints, medicine jars full of marbles, Bingo chips, coffee lids, and plastic cups, which Kaluta glue-gunned together with help from his colleague, Fantasy illustrator Charles Vess.

The Starstruck play received its first national coverage in an article in Starlog magazine #41 in December 1980, which included an interview of Lee and Kaluta, along with Kaluta's design sketches, and stage photos by Sean Smith.

== Comics ==
The characters and stories of Starstruck have continued in comics form across multiple comic companies, but primarily Heavy Metal, Epic, Dark Horse, and IDW.

Going from stage to comics, we were able to expand the universe, introduce more characters and scatter them across multiple planets, settings that would be impossible to build. Throw in some aliens! We could give Kalif a twin, without having to clone an actor. You can show the whole line of 333 Erotica Ann pleasure droids. People can float in a gravity-free atmosphere, without the use of rigs and wires. You can have extreme long shots and close-ups, scenes of one army attacking another. Violence is easier to convey. We could stretch the story to cover longer periods of time. And we could go inside the mind of a character.

— Elaine Lee on the genesis of Starstruck comics.

=== Background and creation ===
The Starstruck play had been optioned by a producer in 1980, which bound Lee from developing any further stage versions for a year. Kaluta saw a solution but with some reluctance: "Though I did suggest Elaine do a comic book version of the play when all the rest of the rights were tied up by the then producer, I didn't want to draw the comic book". Kaluta was known as illustrator of The Shadow comics for DC Comics in the early 1970s, and was hesitant to take such a big project on. They also assessed that a dialogue-heavy script on two simple sets would not translate well to the visual medium of comics. Kaluta said: "But the material, and, especially Elaine's witty approach to everything she writes set a small fire under me".

They found the solution in the backdrop. The stage play had moments where the narrator sketched the backgrounds of each character. Lee and Kaluta had worked out an elaborate backstory of the future time period, the political landscape, the pasts and futures of the characters, and many new characters not seen in the play. This scope of myth-building, inspired by the spirit of Dune and Star Trek, had been beyond their resources to stage or film. Adapting that dynamic epic to comics proved a better solution than simply adapting the play.

By 1980, creator-owned comics published by independent comics publishers were sold in an emerging network of comics stores. Lee and Kaluta took this opportunity to expand their storytelling while retaining sole ownership and control of their creative property. Lee would script and Kaluta would illustrate prequel stories that expanded the backdrop and character relationships in a lead-up to the events of the stage play. Since DC and Marvel Comics were dominated by superheroes, the first market they looked at was the mature comic magazines of Europe.

Their initial model was Heavy Metal magazine, which channeled the adult fantasy serials of France's Métal Hurlant. Lee told an interviewer: "The stuff in Heavy Metal completely blew me away and I wanted to do a play that was something like the stories they published". Kaluta was a fan of the contributing artist Moebius, particularly his kinetic line and non-linear, surprising stories. The Starstruck prequel series they first produced were in the template of these magazines; hallucinogenic narratives, elaborate fine art, epic backdrops, farcical humor, and adult themes, printed in serialized segments across many issues.

The first serials of Starstruck comics were printed in Spain's Ilustracion+Comix Internacional, and then America's Heavy Metal, in 1982.

== Story ==
Centuries in the future, Earth's population has been halved by a nuclear war. Humanity has emigrated out into the universe, colonizing worlds and interacting with aliens. Various regimes have held power, most recently The Great Dictator. After his overthrow by revolutionaries, a power struggle rages on between his heirs, the Bajars, and the revolutionary leaders, the Medeas. Mary Medea fakes her death and begins an elaborate plan to eventually take control and stabilize the anarchic era. Disguised as a new player, Queen Glorianna, she orchestrates a web of interconnections to achieve what will one day be called The Great Change. The story follows the various pawns and rivals in the game, in evolving stages of their lives and of the scheme, as they all eventually meet and collide. In particular the story focuses on the backstories of Galatia 9, a freedom-fighter amazon, and Brucilla The Muscle, a good-natured hothead pilot; where they came from, how they meet, and what happens because of it.

Kaluta explained: "As the books progress, the reader gets a slow reveal of the greater energies and alliances by the way they impact the lives of the happy-go-lucky space girls and boys eking out their bits of the big ball of wax".

== Characters ==
Lee and Kaluta frequently told interviewers they wanted to step away from good-vs.-evil characters to tell stories of flawed people who were too slippery for such boundaries. The writer said: "In our comic book the 'good guys' are not all good, and the 'bad guys' are not totally bad, and the characters do really stupid things. These characters all have faults. [But they] get smarter, just as people learn things in life". The artist said: "There is no ruler of the universe making other people dance. But there's lots of people in the comic who think they're making other people dance. And that's where the fun is, to watch the characters delude themselves".

The cast of the comics are based on the likenesses of the original stage ensemble. Lee explains that when they started the first serials: "Michael drew the characters in Starstruck to look like the actors in the original production". This included the troupe of Wild Hair Productions as well as extended friends. The writer said: "If you had walked into one of our parties, you would think you had walked into a party on Rec Station 97!"

Queen Glorianna / Mary Medea: The Medea family were revolutionaries who overthrew The Great Dictator, P.A.H.M. Bajar. The ongoing feud between the families motivates Mary Medea to go underground in plain sight as the mystical Queen Glorianna. Her ownership of the lucrative Krystal asteroid mines empowers her complex, secretive plan to manipulate a better, progressive future.

Galatia 9: Molly Medea was ostracized from the family in her youth and ended up initiated with the Omegazons, an amazon colony. By wily means she ended up captaining her own fighter ship, The Harpy, and brought in Brucilla as her partner.

Brucilla The Muscle: A Galactic Girl Guide from Kansas who became a star pilot in the jingoistic Space Brigade. When a double-cross frames her into a dishonorable discharge from service, Brucilla brings her skills and temper to the service of Galatia 9.

Erotica Ann: The last of a line of pleasure droids, Annie achieves awareness and slowly evolves a consciousness. As an initial instrument of Glorianna's plan, she threads the lives of the Bajars with the Harpy crew.

Verloona Tï: The wicked stepsister of Galatia 9, a vain and power-hungry vamp with unspeakable appetites.

Kalif Bajar: The idiot great-grandson of The Great Dictator, Kalif is unhealthily attached to a destroyed Erotica Ann model. He eventually colludes with Verloona.

Lucrezia Bajar / Ronnie Lee Ellis: The twin sister of Kalif Bajar, Lucrezia chafes at being passed over for power because of her gender. As the successful author Ronnie Lee Ellis, she orchestrates her own counter-scheme to Glorianna, controlling the nuns of the Cloistered Order of the Cosmic Veil.

Rah El Rex: A schizophrenic dandy who thinks he is being controlled by a being called The Great Disrupter, Rex eventually allies with Verloona.

Harry Palmer: Seen first as a bartender, Harry was actually a soldier with Mary Medea, and transfers his love for her to Erotica Ann, her double.

Randall Factor: A casino owner on the intergalactic watering hole Recreation Station 97, Randall is 'the random factor' whose ties to Glorianna and Harry might not guarantee where his interests lie.

𝗚𝗮𝗹𝗮𝗰𝘁𝗶𝗰 𝗚𝗶𝗿𝗹 𝗚𝘂𝗶𝗱𝗲𝘀 is a fictional group of young girls operating across an anarchic galaxy. The group consists of girls portrayed as resourceful and street-smart, using their agility and planning skills to navigate various situations across the cosmos.

== Publication history ==
Starstruck has essentially been the original 80 pages, printed in serial form and a graphic novel; and then six new issues of Epic Comics. This material was expanded by 100 pages for Dark Horse Comics (up to and including Epic #1); this same material was later refined and recolored for IDW Publishing.

This is known as Volume 1, and was collected in the Starstruck Deluxe Edition. Two or three more volumes are planned, with 220 pages of unpublished new story material expanding the remaining five Epic issues.

=== Comix Internacional (1982) ===
The first Starstruck stories were printed in Spain starting in April 1982, in the anthology magazine Ilustracion+Comix Internacional #17. The magazine was an equivalent to Metal Hurlant and Heavy Metal, printing countercultural science fiction and fantasy comics with adult themes and sexuality. Editor Josep Toutain was an artist and artists agent representing the wave of Spanish talent who had rejuvenated Warren Publishing titles like Vampirella and Creepy in the mid-1970s; he ran the European branch of Warren, then took it over, and expanded into other imprints and graphic novels. Toutain also reprinted innovative strips by American artists like Will Eisner, Richard Corben, and Howard Chaykin.

The color was provided by an uncredited Spanish coloring house, which added rich watercolor-esque hues working from the color cues provided by Kaluta. The stories ran as serialized vignettes across seven issues: from April to November 1982, skipping the September issue and doubling the length in the October issue.

Starstruck was on the front cover of Ilustracion+Comix Internacional #17 (April 1982), featuring Kaluta's watercolor art of the warrior/poet droid, Veep 7, and the large headline "Estrenamos Aqui un Espectaculo de Broadway Llevado al Comic por Mike W. Kaluta y Elaine Lee: Starstruck". It also appeared on the front cover of Ilustracion+Comix Internacional #23, using a portrait piece of Erotica Ann from the limited edition Starstruck portfolio, printed in color for the first time. The headline read "La Increible Fantasia de Mike Kaluta".

=== Heavy Metal (1982) ===
The Starstruck stories were then picked up for their first American publication by Heavy Metal, edited by Julie Simmons-Lynch. They were run as chapters averaging about seven to eight pages each across nine issues from November 1982, to July 1983. Heavy Metal traded often on Kaluta's fame in comic art circles, running bylines for him on the front and back covers to promote interest. Starstruck was front-loaded as the first story in the initial issues.

The magazine's Art Director at the time was John Workman, who would also letter much of the later Epic Comics run, as well as the eventual Galactic Girl Guides back-up stories. The English lettering was done by Todd Klein, who was then at the begin of his career.

In the seventh issue, May 1983, a five-page article was included by contributing Editor Stephen Maloff, with an overview of the play's two productions and its transition into mature comics. The Lee and Kaluta interviews were supplemented with art and color photos of the stage play shot by Sean Smith.

=== Marvel Graphic Novel (1984) ===
The entirety of the Comix Internacional/Heavy Metal stories were published as Marvel Graphic Novel No. #13 in September 1984, titled Starstruck: The Luckless, the Abandoned and Forsaked. The title was a quote from Bob Dylan's 1964 song "Chimes of Freedom". This publication retained the Spanish color, with a few tweaks and additions in the stories. When Marvel editorial expressed concern at the violence in a scene where space Amazons defeat beastly hillbillies, Elaine Lee added a war song that repeated the refrain: "The Dromes were bad [repeated six times]/ so we had to kill them".

Marvel Editor-In-Chief Jim Shooter recommended cutting three pages, and adding three new pages. The sequence with young Bronwyn falling into the tank of empathic merpeople was cut from the graphic novel, but restored and expanded in the later Dark Horse series.

The graphic novel, dedicated to director Robert Altman and author Thomas Pynchon, included a four-page glossary in the back that expanded upon references in the story. This became an ongoing tradition in future issues. It was nominated for a Jack Kirby Award as the Best Graphic Album of 1985.

=== Epic Comics (1985) ===
Marvel's imprint, Epic Comics, was created as an outlet for creator-owned, mature, experimental comics series. Editor Archie Goodwin spun the acclaim and success of the Starstruck graphic novel into an ongoing series by Lee and Kaluta. These were the first story expansions past the initial run of serial stories printed in Ilustracion+Comix International, Heavy Metal, and the Marvel Graphic Novel.

A Marvel promotional magazine, Marvel Age #15 (June 1984), ran a cover story on Archie Goodwin and his editing of the new Epic comics titles and Epic Illustrated magazine. A cover cartoon of Epic characters by Rick Parker included Brucilla the Muscle as well as her Tiger Brigade shark ship.

The new series ran for six bi-monthly issues cover-dated from February 1985, to February 1986. Archie Goodwin took a hands-off approach to editing, saying "I could edit this, but I would ruin it". The first two issues were colored by Elaine Lee, later ones by Steve Oliff. The first two were lettered by Ken Bruzenak, later ones by John Workman. The Epic issues ran ads for purchasing the two Starstruck T-shirts, the art portfolio, and the stage play script.

The story arc introduced Harry Palmer, a character inspired by noir detective fiction who opened the doors on much of Queen Glorianna's past and her future plans. Lee cites this as her favorite character, and the only love story she ever wrote. A trio of Galactic Girl Guides became a running thread through the issues. One of the Guides would become a crucial historian in the future, the person credited for all the barbed and humorous Glossary entries.

A cover story and career overview with Michael Kaluta appeared in Comics Journal #103 (November 1985). The cover featured Starstruck's Erotica Ann disrobing from The Shadow's cloak while saying, "Is this really what it takes to get your attention?" Kaluta spoke at length about the genesis and development of the Starstruck play and comics. Comics Journal #111 featured an extensive review of Starstruck in September 1986, praising it for its intelligence and progressive approach to gender and sexual identity issues.

=== Comico Comic (1987) ===
After the Epic Comics series ended, Lee and Kaluta created two stories about the Galactic Girl Guides, published as back-up strips in Dave Stevens's The Rocketeer Adventure Magazine from Comico Comics in 1987 and '88. These stories focused on the youthful misadventures of Brucilla the Muscle and her two friends as they became Guides, and were done in a lighter slapstick tone. Fantasy illustrator Charles Vess, a long-time colleague of Kaluta's who had helped him create costumes and props for the play, was the inker.

Lee and Kaluta intended this kid-friendly approach, without the trappings of the epic backstory, as an easier portal to the Starstruck universe for new readers. More stories were planned until a long lag in continuing the Rocketeer's adventures put the idea on hold.

=== Dark Horse Comics (1990) ===
When Dark Horse Comics contacted Kaluta for a job, he thought they were approaching him for continuing Starstruck. Editor Randy Spradley was delighted by the idea, and the first Starstruck revival began. Dark Horse had noted that Epic Comics series which, like Starstruck, had not sold well in the limited release of comic stores were finding their audiences as collected trade collections, such as Moonshadow and Elektra: Assassin. They felt the time was now fortuitous to do a new graphic novel collection.

Lee and Kaluta unveiled Starstruck: The Expanding Universe. Instead of starting with new stories or just collecting the finished ones into a trade paperback, the two creators decided to essentially start over: the initial series would actually be the original graphic novel and Epic issues, but with huge expansions of new story and art inside of them, to be followed by all-new material encompassing the remaining stories they had not done yet. They envisioned three printing arcs, each a volume in the total history of Starstruck.

The first four issues were published as Volume 1 from August 1990, to March 1991, with over 100 pages of new material that substantially redefined and expanded everything printed before. Volume 1 included the graphic novel, the expanded material, and ended after the first Epic Comics issue.

In the editorial page of the premiere issue, the publishing plan was outlined: there would be 12 total issues, divided as three volumes; each volume would be four issues each, separated with short publishing breaks between, and would include a total of 320 pages of new material, Volume 2 would have continued into the Epic issues, expanding greatly on the Harry Palmer storyline. It was left undefined in the press release whether the third volume would also consist of the remaining Epic issues with new material, or instead be all-new material following those stories, such as an adaption of the stage play itself, or a dramatization of the "Great Change" event that the series' Glossary often refers to as the ultimate fruition of the narrative.

The four issues were printed this time in black-and-white. This was the first time that the initial 80 pages of the graphic novel material had been printed in the smaller comic book size. Because that art had originally been formatted for a magazine medium with squarer dimensions, these pages now had about 20% white space at the bottom of the more rectangular comics format pages. This evened out in the latter part of the fourth issue, with the reprinting of the first Epic Comics issue, which was originally done in the regular comic size dimensions.

Todd Klein returned, supplementing his original lettering of the Graphic Novel era stories by completely re-lettering the reprint of Epic #1, which had first been lettered by Ken Bruzenak.

The second issue began the introductory story summaries by fan Lee Moyer, who would later renovate the series with his lavish color for the IDW remastered revival.

The Dark Horse issues ran ads for purchasing the two Starstruck T-shirts, the portfolio, and the stage play script. Dark Horse also used a Starstruck character on the cover of their anthology series, "Cheval Noir" #18 (May 1991); a painting by Kaluta of the fighter droid Veep 7.

Kaluta did the cover and some amount of new interior art for the unpublished fifth issue which would begin Volume 2, but - while simultaneously doing production design for various TV shows - a state of exhaustion wore him down. Dark Horse printed no further issues after the fourth, leaving the series revival in hiatus.

=== Tundra Comics (1990s) ===
Through the 1990s, attempts were made to continue Starstruck in some comics form. In interviews, Kaluta has detailed a successive attempt to do new Galactic Girl Guides stories. Five issues intended for Tundra Publishing were plotted by him along with writer Phil Trumbo, and illustrated by Linda Medley with lettering by Todd Klein. Lee recalls: "Michael and I were supposed to have done the Galactic Girl Guides for Kevin Eastman's company, Tundra Comics. But when Tundra was bought by Kitchen Sink, the project was cancelled".

Kaluta's website mentions that in 1996 he was "(s)till drawing Starstruck, the Expanding Universe for Dark Horse Comics. The first collection is to be published by Marlowe & Co. in the fall of 1996. Marlowe chokes and refuses to publish. Project dead". This implied that there was a chance at a graphic novel collection of the Volume 1 expanded stories, while Kaluta was also working further on completing expanded story art for Volume 2.

In 1995, Kaluta contributed art to a story in Elaine Lee's erotic comics collection, Skin Tight Orbit Volume 1, which takes place in the Starstruck universe; the story, "The Next Best Thing..." was initially published in Heavy Metal. Three other stories drawn by Mary Wilshire star a character who looks like Galatia 9 and have references to Starstruck such as the Handi Andy pleasure droid.

=== IDW revival (2009) ===
In 2009, IDW Publishing began to publish Starstruck comic book series. These 13 monthly issues were a remastering of the Dark Horse "Expanded Universe" series: the original graphic novel, the 100 pages of added material, and the first Epic Comics issue. Kaluta now expanded the bulk of the art pages from the square format to the full rectangular format with new art. Painter Lee Moyer did a lush and complex revamping of all the color using contemporary digital technology. Besides the revised version of "Volume 1", the two Galactic Girl Guides stories first printed by Comico would now be reprinted along with several other unpublished GGG stories from that era, inked by Charles Vess and lettered by John Workman.

Additionally, there were new pin-ups, and revised entries in the Glossary. Fan artists were given a spotlight in a few issues: CG diagrams of the ship, The Harpy, were provided by Walt Carter; and Kristina Carroll did a painting of art assassin Kettle Black in a scene alluded to in text but never previously shown before. A new color fumetti-story concluded the final issue, using some of Sean Smith's play photos, which included Elaine Lee as Galatia 9 and Susan Norfleet Lee as Brucilla the Muscle.

The first issue was released on August 12, 2009, and the series was completed in September 2010. The final afterword stated, "This is not the end! The saga will continue!"

=== IDW: Old Proldiers Never Die (2017) ===
Crowdfunded in 2013 and published by IDW in 2017, Old Proldiers Never Die is a new six-issue story arc about Harry Palmer searching for Annie.

== Collected editions ==
Starstruck: The Luckless, the Abandoned and Forsaked ISBN 978-0-87135-001-5 came out as a Marvel original graphic novel. Starstruck Deluxe Edition, a hardcover collection of the expanded and remastered series, was released from IDW on March 29, 2011 (ISBN 978-1-60010-872-3).

This larger-format (8.5" x 12") omnibus contained the remastered IDW issues; the Galactic Girl Guides back-up stories; an introduction by writer Mike Carey; a history of Starstruck's evolution from Tym Stevens; a fumetti story using Sean Smith's stage photos; a gallery of pin-ups and covers; and the expanded Glossary.

The Starstruck Deluxe Edition essentially reprints Volume 1 of the Dark Horse era Starstruck: The Expanding Universe: specifically, the original serials that were collected as the Marvel Graphic Novel, plus the first issue of Epic Comics, and the 100 pages of new story and art that Lee and Kaluta laced through them in 1990. Additionally the art was newly increased by 20% on each page by Kaluta in 2009, and new color was painted by Lee Moyer. The volume ends with "To Be Continued", and various reproductions of Harry Palmer indicate that Volume 2 will focus on the second and third Epic Comics issues with new, expanded story and art. Starstruck Deluxe Edition was designed by Elaine Lee and Lee Moyer.

IDW published a softcover version of the Starstruck Deluxe Edition, starting on August 22, 2012 (ISBN 978-1-61377-439-7). The new edition was slightly smaller (7.25" x 11"), with the same contents as the Starstruck Deluxe Edition and new cover art by Kaluta.

In June 2014, IDW published Starstruck Treasury Edition. This reprinted the original Marvel Comics graphic novel collection of 1984 in a 72-page softcover, now in a larger (9.25" x 14.25") format.

== Art and composition ==
(Kaluta) gives us beautifully rendered scenes of surpassing grandeur, while winking at their pomposity and silliness at the same time. ...(H)e shows us not only the glitter and the brilliance, but the places where the seams have split, and where the false walls are propped up behind. This works wonderfully with Lee's multi-layered tomfoolery.

— Comics Journal #111, September 1986.

Starstruck stories reference diverse elements of pop culture, science fiction, and international art. Michael Kaluta drew on his varied artistic influences to directly homage or indirectly parallel these inspirations, including Art Nouveau, Art Deco, Golden Age illustrators, Pulp magazine covers, EC Comics, Métal Hurlant, and Anime.

Kaluta references classic fine art and illustrative design often in his work: "My drawing 'style' came from my attempts to draw like all the artists I was impressed with. Although some of them were certainly Comic Book artists, many more were illustrators and designers from the turn of the 19th Century". A crucial event in the finale of the Epic issue #6 features an island that tributes the painting, "Isle Of The Dead" (Basil version, 1880) by symbolist Arnold Bocklin. The use of circle border frames in compositions, serpentine forms in architecture and fabric, and elegant pantomime in characters like Queen Glorianna continue the Art Nouveau poster work of Alphonse Mucha and paintings of Gustav Klimt. His grand panoramas of mountains are in the tradition of Maxfield Parrish. The panoplies of intricate columned palaces recall Art Nouveau cartoonist Winsor McCay's Little Nemo. The fluid body language and theatrical framing of characters is in the spirit of comics innovator Will Eisner: Kaluta specified: "Anybody who doesn't think I've studied this Will Eisner fellow just hasn't looked at my work. He's the man".

The technology he draws pays visual nods to many retro styles of science fiction design, as well as contemporaneous styles. On the classic side, the rockets and pistols of Dick Calkins' Buck Rogers comic strip art and from Flash Gordon serials; and the spaceship interiors of EC Comics artists like Wally Wood and Roy Krenkel: Kaluta wrote of his mentor: "Seeing what Roy Krenkel accomplished with line, shape and negative space stirred my imagination and set my nascent abilities onto a highway into my future as an artist". On the modern end, the curved plastic modularity of 1960s Italian futuristic furniture design (such as by designer Joe Columbo); the rundown quality of it in films like Star Wars and Alien; and the linework of Moebius, such as the arid and surrealistic landscapes in his series Arzach and The Airtight Garage, as well as in spacesuit designs like Brucilla The Muscle's pilot suit. Kaluta has a professed admiration for Manga and Anime stalwarts like Katsuhiro Otomo (Akira) and Masamune Shirow (Ghost In the Shell); many of those style hallmarks show in his design for the Samarai-esque droid, Veep 7. Kaluta told an Italian interviewer: "I like Otomo's style, and that of Hayao Miyazaki. I'm a big fan of the work by Shirow and am always looking at Adamo's drawings and paintings".

=== Structure ===
The world of Starstruck is like an enormous, decadent Disneyland where half the rides don't work. It's full of jolly perverseness. It's incestuously theatrical. It's radical, it's funny, and it knows it.

— Critic Robert Rodi for the Comics Journal, 1986.

The series started in 1982 by eschewing the then standard superhero formula of one male character in self-contained stories, instead using an ensemble of mainly female characters in multiple entwined story threads. The original first 73 pages of serial stories covered a span of nearly three decades, on different planets, with a wide and seemingly unconnected cast, which ultimately led to everyone coming to one space station at the same time. Lee wrote in 1997: "There is no reason why a story written for a comic shouldn't be every bit as involving as the plot of a novel. It's a wonderful form, and it can be stretched as far as creators and publishers are willing to go with it". The series was non-linear by the sheer span of its subjects, the episodic glimpses of them in different times and places, their flashback sequences, the element of perceived randomness altering their paths, and the uncertainty of their connectedness. The writer said in 2009: "When we were first published, people were used to comics with linear stories about a main character. But now, with an audience used to shows like Heroes and Lost, with large casts and non-linear storylines, we're hoping that Starstruck will find an even larger readership".

Starstruck used supplement texts as a dramatic expansion of the story. The Glossary, written by one fictional historian, went past defining references in the dialogue to sketching out the past, present, and future of the characters and their universe. Writer Alan Moore would do something similar afterward, more simply in Watchmen (1985) and League Of Extraordinary Gentlemen (1999). Comics Journal praised this innovation in 1986: "The (Space) Brigade's origin in the Graphic Novel's glossary section, is hilarious; in general, the Starstruck glossaries provide as much mirth as the series itself". It reiterated this supportive praise in 2011: "Starstruck's reputation as a confusing book unfairly implies that it is a confused book, which it emphatically is not. History, culture, family relationships, religions, vernacular speech, and all manner of written texts from this fantastic world accumulate and intersect with perfect consistency". Also praising the innovation, critic W. Andrew Shepard wrote in 2011: "These sub-texts were more than winking references; they foreshadowed major events in the main narrative and, in keeping with the theme of unreliable narrators, called attention to the ways people construct histories".

The series is full of unreliable narrators who embroider the facts to suit their agenda, have their facts wrong, see only their part in events, or who miss out completely on what was important: i.e., another fictional historian is clearly fuzzy on facts that the reader has witnessed differently, though he admits it. Kaluta said they "are the people we have living today, just regular people that have a way of kidding themselves about as much as they kid other people, sometimes maliciously, sometimes unknowingly". Later Lee expanded this thought: "That's something we tried to do throughout Starstruck. A character like Brucilla may exaggerate, others will outright lie and still others may be misinformed. Like life. When you're looking through the eyes of any one character, you'll only get a fraction of the picture".

Much of the humor in Starstruck's dialogue lies in the contradictions of their perceptions and actions, as they improvise their way through erratic situations. Critic David Allan Jones wrote of the intricacies of the Starstruck discourse: "The (Robert) Altman-esque dialogue style is also a joy to parse out- as confusing and disorienting as it sometimes can be, it's always witty and clever". The 1984 graphic novel was dedicated to Robert Altman and author Thomas Pynchon, to which Lee explained to an interviewer: "If regular comics are like a Steven Spielberg movie, maybe this one is more like a Robert Altman movie". She stated her admiration of Pynchon's complex allusive style by saying: "It is dense, it is packed with images. When you're reading Pynchon all sorts of doors open up in your brain".

The series operated on multiple levels, with the extras like the Glossary or the play script redefining new additional perspectives, while some deeper levels may only come into focus when the series is ultimately finished: e.g., Queen Glorianna's hand symbols, her ultimate plan, and how the main characters fit into the eventual Great Change she intends. Lee advised in 1984: "If you want to know everything that is going on, you have to look at the things in the background as well as the figures in the foreground. And just let it roll around in your mind".

Dialogue and sound effects are often used deliberately like a physical element: i.e., two androids converse in four different but simultaneous streams that overwhelm the physical space of the other characters. Elaine Lee told in a SuicideGirls interview: "We did include one scene in the graphic novel where Brucilla's dialogue balloons begin to crowd Galatia off the page, in order to show that the character was a loudmouth". Letterer Todd Klein remembers: "They asked a lot from a newby letterer, and I tried hard to deliver. It was the first time I was called on to letter in a wide variety of styles, and it was good practice for (later) books like Sandman". During their work for Epic Comics, Klein recalls: "There was a memorable lunch with editor Archie Goodwin and Elaine where she and I went on and on about the minutiae of the lettering while Archie just nodded, looking a bit stunned that there could be so much to say about it".

The panel layouts suggest a widescreen film in their arrangement: from the first page onward, a running layout motif of stacked page-wide rectangular panels suggests a cinematic vista, in contrast to the style of tight, multiple panel grids in average comics more similar to television's ratio and rapid editing. By lessening use of the constrictive grid, much of the series simulates the feel of being wide open and watched from a wide view lens. Kaluta took care to give perspective panoramas of the Starstruck universe, but to fill them with functional details that ground its reality for the reader and stage its complexity: "[A]nyone can walk...around inside, go around the outside, around the back, and know that there's going to be something there".

== Themes ==
Brucilla filled the archetype of the rowdy, boozing, promiscuous hotshot pilot normally reserved for men, and preceded Battlestar Galactica’s Kara Thrace in doing so by about 20 years. And as an anarchist punk spaceship captain who was arrested in her youth for defacing public property with feminist revisions of nursery rhymes, Galatia-9 was a Riot Grrrl before the movement existed.

— Critic W. Andrew Shepard of The New Inquiry, 2011.

=== Feminism ===
Starstruck is consistently lauded for its mostly female cast, the depth and range of the individual characters, and the upending of gender and sexual stereotypes through the series. The genesis of this was practical: Elaine Lee formed her theater company as a way for women to create and perform better roles than the 1979 New York scene was offering them, and Starstruck extended this idea into the universe; she recounts: "The idea was to do something really wild, so that we could all show off and do parts we would normally never be cast for. I was five feet tall and weighed about 90 pounds soaking wet, but I wanted to be an amazon starship captain, so Galatia 9 was the part I came up with for myself". At the same time, Lee was reading a lot of feminist science fiction, which she initially found liberating, but had qualms with the two common themes: the rebel women versus the "'planet of chauvinist pigs' scenario...began to wear me down. If a fictional world presents you with all the same problems that greet you each day in the office, what fun is that?" Conversely, the stories focusing on a blissful all-female utopia left her unmoved: "My main problem with Utopian sci-fi is that nothing ever explodes, and the love scenes are really boring". With Starstruck she attempted to lift the discourse out of a dogma of revenge or exclusion into a broader spectrum where personality, skill, and fun drove the characters. In 1997 she wrote: "Science fiction is at its best when it offers us new ways to look at our problems. It is silliest when it offers too many (or too little) solutions. Then it is simply an allegory...or worse, propaganda". In 2011, a critical essay from The New Inquiry lauded this approach: "But Lee deliberately eschews the separatist narrative and isn't above mocking the knee-jerk misandry which often colored those stories. Instead, our heroine is forced out into the universe at large, where she is confronted with the task of helping to build a society more congruent with her ideals".

When Starstruck moved into the sights of mainstream comics buyers during the Epic Comics run in 1985, the series had to contend with the attitudes of a predominantly young male market. Lee remembers: "We got quite a reaction to the fact that there were so many female characters in the story ("Is the writer a lesbian? Does she have a political agenda? Is the artist gay? Do they both hate men?"). We had to wonder why everyone was so concerned about our sexuality when no one was wondering what Gilbert Hernandez and Jaime Hernandez meant by putting all those women in Love and Rockets". Lee and Kaluta were vocal advocates of Love And Rockets, an indie comics success that also earned critical notice for the breadth of its female cast: Kaluta saw it as further evidence of the mature move to escape the gender role restrictions imposed on women in comics: "Love And Rockets is an incredibly adult comic strip. You can't fault it, because the characters are real". Kaluta dismissed gender categorizers by saying of the Starstruck characters: "They're people that don't pander to what you're expecting a female character in a science fiction play or comic book to be, they're just people. If you don't like them, they're not going to change for you".

Critic Robert Rodi, covering progressive Gay issues in comics for the Comics Journal in 1986, wrote: "Starstruck is an explosion of alternate sexuality and its phenomenal trappings. Characters are (overtly or not) homosexual, heterosexual, asexual, antisexual, omnisexual - you name it, it's there if you look for it". In multiple examples the series turns gender cliches inside out: Lee parodied the 'whore' role by empowering the former pleasure droid Erotica Ann; commented on the uselessly pliant 'madonna' role with the passive nuns of the Cloister Of The Goddess Uncaring; dealt with themes of sexuality that erased boundaries between genders, species, and machines; included ritualistic amazons who also like a good bacchanal; and featured a starship captain upfront who owned her sensuality and enjoyed it. The underlying themes in Starstruck regarding gender and sexuality are consistently sex-positive, anti-sexist, tolerant of sexual preference, anti-misogyny and anti-misandry, and emphasizing the individual person above any categories. In 2011, a Comics Journal reviewer wrote: "Lee and Kaluta deserve a special award for appropriating the entire comic book tradition of women as eye candy for heterosexual male readers and setting those bodies free, throwing the reader's desires and expectations for a loop".

In 2011, Lee said: "People thought we had some political agenda, because we had a lot of female characters. Now it's not unusual".

=== Destiny ===
Fate plays an underlying factor in the story: characters who feel that destiny intends greatness for them (Verloona, Bajar, Kalif); those who feel they have been cheated out of a better station (Lucrezia Bajar, Brucilla The Muscle); those that intend to manipulate fate into their own control (Queen Glorianna, Rah El Rex); those that feel fate is meaningless and anything goes (Randall Factor); and those that feel personal focus will get them through random chaos (Galatia 9, the Galactic Girl Guides). The artist said: "You have to become your own law in a way. There are self-appointed protectors of humanity, some of whom are protecting it for themselves, and some of whom have the idea that there is a better way and will stop things that are against the peoples' interests".

=== Satirical intent ===
Starstruck takes aim at many aspects of society.

These include religion (a science fiction author who invents a front religion with converts who passively fund a scheme of power and control, and the March Baptists who ally with corrupt corporate dictators for power); gambling (the idle rich who will gamble everything on the mere chance of someone perhaps coming into the room); vanity (a villainess who may have sacrificed many young girls just to stay youthful, and salons where hours of one's lifespan are sold by the poor to rich patrons who want a longer life); militarism (half of Earth was disintegrated in an act of militaristic paranoia, and then covered up by a hologram, and jingoistic Space Brigades who feel the universe is only there for them to thrust their agenda and control onto); and the arts (conceptual art assassins who eliminate creators of really bad plays, and a conjoined trio of actors turning self-absorbed frilliness into high drama).

Reviewer Richard Caldwell wrote: "The plot is fast-moving and puzzle-like, with strong elements of political intrigue and satire alike cavorting about the omniverse in a futuristic setting where multiple clans struggle for dominance over a mix of cultures as boggled by the theologies of the day as they are by the sensory overload of sensationalistic commercialism that passes for status quo".

Starstruck initially began its creative life as a stage play spoofing time-worn tropes of science fiction. Kaluta recalled his reaction to Lee's script: "Oh God, I was amazed at how many genres she was actually poking fun at, without being a dyed-in-the-wool science fiction fan. She was poking fun at Andre Norton, she was poking fun at everybody, all the Doc Smith stuff, without ever having read Doc Smith".

=== Absurdism ===
Starstruck laces its drama and intrigue with bouts of surrealistic farce, ludicrous slapstick, absurd non-sequiters, random weirdness, cross-communication, cultural parody, and one-liners.

The writer clarified: "Of course, it includes some social commentary - people often comment on the feminism - but it's all comedy. I want people to enjoy it. People accept new ideas and commentary more readily if they're funny". Lee points to the feuding Bajar twins, Kalif and Lucrezia, whose sibling jealousy gets out of hand due to their wealth and power: "In real life they probably would have just annoyed people in a bar; in comic books they blow people up". The writer saw absurdism as a philosophical antidote or survival perspective in the Starstruck universe, as well as in its creative process: "We get real serious about showing the humanity of our characters, and at the same time, we feel that life is silly, and something that seems horribly embarrassing and horribly important is really silly at the same time". Critic Robert Rodi wrote: "Lee has reinvented Camp as a new sensibility; it isn't Camp in that it violates all known laws of drama and internal logic for the sake of flamboyance or effect. Rather, she's taken the space opera form and, while respecting the limitations of physics as we know them, pushed the genre's more baroque aspects to their absolute limits".

=== Archetypes ===
The series takes gender-bending liberties with many iconic female and male roles of world history and popular culture. They include the Cowgirl (the Medea women on their space ranch); Amazons (Galatia 9 and the Omegazon tribe who christened her); bimbo/sex dolls (Erotica Ann and the 333 Annie pleasure droids, and the male droid, Handi Andy); valkyries (Brucilla The Muscle, the flying warrior whose uniform makes her resemble Brunhilda); the White Queen (Queen Glorianna, the tough revolutionary posing as a shining monarch) and the Black Queen (Verloona Ti, the devourer of little children); and hardboiled detectives (Harry Palmer, the tough pug with a wounded heart).

== Merchandise and collectibles ==
- Portfolio: During the first run of the Starstruck stage play in 1980, Michael Kaluta illustrated character portraits of six of the main characters. Sal Quartuccio of S. Q. Productions published these as a limited edition portfolio of 2000; the 11"x14" prints were in black-and-white, sealed in an envelope which Kaluta signed and numbered.
- T-shirts: In 1985, Graphitti Designs sold two Starstruck T-shirts with original art by Kaluta. One showed Erotica Ann, while the other spotlighted Erotica Ann and her lover, Harry Palmer, both with the Starstruck logo. These were offered for sale in the Epic Comics issues. In 1990, these shirt designs were amended with the Starstruck: The Expanding Universe logo, for sale in the Dark Horse issues.
- Buttons: Kaluta designed color lapel pins with individual characters for Graphitti Designs. Set 1 included Brucilla The Muscle, Galatia 9, Erotica Ann, Verloona Ti, E-V, and a faux Erotica Ann (Mary Medea). A second set with Eeeeeeeeeluh, Bronwyn of The Veil, Rah El Rex, and Kalif Bajar went unrealized.
- Convention Poster: Kaluta produced a 1990 poster for a comics convention in Grenoble, France, depicting Galactic Girl Guides playing with hand puppets of the Starstruck cast. The poster was printed in large forms on walls and billboards around the city during the convention.
- WonderCon Convention Program Book: Kaluta's 1990 cover for the WonderCon 5 program book which depicted Galactic Girl Guides on a San Francisco cable car in Chinatown being watched over by The Shadow.
- Comic-Con Volunteer T-shirt: Volunteers who help out on all four days of San Diego Comic-Con receive "a rare and extremely limited Comic-Con volunteer t-shirt that is different each year- making the shirts instant collector's items". The souvenir T-shirt for the 1990 San Diego Comic-Con was a Starstruck shirt, printed with Kaluta's spoof of Dave Stevens's The Rocketeer featuring Brucilla The Muscle.
- Trading cards: Two sets of trading cards covering Michael Kaluta's art career were released in the 1990s by publisher Michael Freidlander's imprint, FPG. Series 1 (90 cards, 1994) contained 12 Starstruck cards, and Series 2 (90 cards, 1995) contained 4 Starstruck cards. An additional set of cards called Metallic Storms printed on metallic foil contained one more Starstruck card.
- Starstruck script: The script of the stage play, based on the revised 1983 production, was published in March 1985, and advertised in the Epic and Dark Horse issues.
- 2011 Merchandise: In September 2011, The AudioComics Company offered new Starstruck merchandise for sale at its online store through Zazzle.com, each using the art for the audioplay adaption: a new T-shirt, a coffee mug, and a customizable iPod Touch case. In October, a separate line of new Starstruck merchandise based on the remastered IDW series was launched, also through an online store on Zazzle.com: ten different T-shirts in various cuts, which included Brucilla And The Galactic Girl Guides, the Tri-Clone Invasion badge, Galatia And Brucilla The Muscle, The United Federation of Female Freedom Fighters emblem, the villain Verloona with Kalif and Rex, the Skate The Mirror Mission Badge, the Droid Wars Mission Patch, Kalif and the Pleasure Droids, the Bajar twins on a playing card, and the AudioPlay cover art; a coffee mug starring the heroes and another mug for the villains; a poster print of the Vercadian Protector Droid with the Aguatunesian mer-people by Kaluta, and an Aquacade poster designed from Kaluta's original Portfolio portrait of the mermaid Eeeeeeeeeeluh with an update by painter/graphic designer Lee Moyer.

== Screen adaptations ==
In 1980, Michael Kaluta told Future Life magazine: "Starstruck is a big bundle of potential. It has the potential for being a film, a play, a big-budget thing; who knows what".

In various interviews Lee and Kaluta have each spoken of different plans through the 1990s to continue Starstruck on film or television, consistently emphasizing retention of copyright ownership and creative control. Kaluta said in 1993: "We own the characters, and we can do whatever we want with to do with them, but when you do what you want with them, the people you do it with will want to own them. Somebody will want to come in and fool with them".

In 1990 through 1993, Kaluta worked on a project adapting the concept into movie form, but this came to naught; Kaluta noted in his career biography: "For Limelight and Largo Entertainment: (1990 - 91): Character, setting, mood and toy prototypes for 'The Adventures of Brucilla the Muscle, Galactic Girl Guide/Guard', sometimes called 'Maddie McPhee and the Galactic Girl Guides' -- a movie spin-off of (Starstruck)-- in development by Pet Fly Productions for Walt Disney Productions, October 1992".

In 2000, Kaluta told to a Spanish interviewer that he hoped his Starstruck comic book will make its way to TV or film.

Lee has spoken of negotiations for a TV series circa 2003, where a network bought the option to turn Starstruck into a live action show in the spirit of Firefly or Farscape: "I wrote (and was paid for) pitch documents, several scripts and I outlined a season of episodes for them. But when it finally came down to the deal, they asked us to renegotiate our contract, giving them much more control of the property than made us comfortable. We bowed out".

=== Starstruck: The Audioplay (2010) ===
An audio reading of the original play took place at the Henry Miller Library in Big Sur, in part to help pay the medical bills of comics legend Gene Colan, the bills stemming from his bout with liver failure in 2007 and 2008, and partly as a warm-up to a subsequent recording, launching a new Starstruck radio series.

The reading took place on August 15, 2009, with Elaine Lee and Lee Moyer in attendance, along with other comic artists from around North California and original members of the 1983 Starstruck production.

The official recording of the play occurred in May 2010, produced by the AudioComics Company; it was recorded in Portland, Maine, with a full cast and sound effects, in collaboration with WMPG radio. The role of the villainous Verloona Ti was portrayed by Denise Poirier, known for being the voice of the animated Aeon Flux. The audioplay production was made available for sale as MP3 downloads from iTunes, Amazon MP3, Amazon MP3 UK, CD Baby, ZBS, Napster, Microsoft Zune, and the AudioComics Company in October the same year. A double-disc CD was also made available through CD Baby and ZBS.

=== Starstruck: Running Scared (2011) ===
A second audioplay, from a new story by Elaine Lee called "Running Scared", was recorded in conjunction with I-CON, on April 16, 2011, with the plan of releasing it as a free download later that year. April 16 has been a recurring date for Starstruck: the start of the 1980 play; the start of the 1983 play; and this recording. This recording returned Denise Poirier as Verloona, and marked the debut of Michael Kaluta playing a Starstruck character.

In the final issue of the IDW series, Elaine Lee alluded to other impending audioplays with "all-new episodes in which Galatia, Bru, and Annie fly missions for the U4F (United Federation of Female Freedom Fighters)". This reiterated a previous interview statement where she said: "We're thinking that the new audio pieces will happen, chronologically speaking, in that space of time between end of the comic series and the events of the play, when Galatia 9, Brucilla and the reprogrammed Erotica Ann are flying missions for the U4F".

Additionally, the idea was announced of doing "an all-ages series of short audio plays featuring the Galactic Girl Guides".

== Website ==
In February 2012, an official Starstruck website was launched, designed and supervised by Elaine Lee and her son. The site announced it would post the entirety of the Starstruck Deluxe Edition graphic novel's pages across the span of its first year, in serialized posts three times weekly. The site also included the complete contents of the series glossary; quotes of acclaim from famous creators and journalist reviews; an historical overview of the series; and merchandise links.

== Old Proldiers Never Die (Kickstarter) ==
Elaine Lee launched a Kickstarter campaign in April 2013 to raise funds to expand Harry Palmer's story within the Starstruck story. Lee and Kaluta established a goal of $44,000 to produce a 176-page graphic novel in black and white, and a stretch goal of $69,000 for full color. The graphic novel included reprints of the Epic Comics series with expanded content, but consists mainly of new story and extras.

The Kickstarter campaign raised $67,777, and although short of the stretch goal, Lee has committed to produce the book in full color. The graphic novel Harry Palmer: Starstruck was estimated to be delivered by spring of 2015, but the project struggled with delays. In 2017 IDW published the new Starstruck story, first in a series of six issues (February - July 2017), later that year as a one-volume graphic novel.

== Legacy ==
Reading Starstruck is like reading sci-fi written and drawn by J.S. Bach in the middle of an acid trip: fugues and choruses and multi-part harmonies of narrative, playing off each other in unexpected ways to produce delayed reveals, sting-in-the-tail pay-offs, devastating, poignant, and ironic juxtapositions.

— Mike Carey and A.J. Lake, intro to Starstruck Deluxe Edition, 2011.

Writer Clive Barker has stated: "I was, and am, a huge fan of Starstruck, which I think was one of the most brave and elegant experiments in comic book story-telling".

Writer Mike Carey, when asked to name his favorite comic of all time, responded "Starstruck, by Lee and Kaluta". He was later asked to write the introduction to the Starstruck Deluxe Edition with his wife Lin Carey, known by her pen name as the Fantasy author, A.J. Lake (The Darkest Age series): "The truth is, there just never was another book out there that did what Starstruck did". They praised the progressive innovations of the series by stating: "So how cool is it that at the end of the first decade of the 21st century, it still reads as being ahead of its time?"

Publishers Weekly opined in 2009 that "the cult classic comic Starstruck [was] well ahead of its time when initially released in 1985", pointing particularly to "a cast of strong female characters—a rarity in comics then and now".

After the 1984 graphic novel was published, Kaluta remembers "a few letters, coming in saying: 'My, this is really too clever'. The writer and artist are being very, very clever, here, obviously clever, it's too convoluted to follow". The Epic Comics series won critical acclaim and a cult audience, but similar letters followed. Kaluta was proudest of one from an angry reader that took the creators to task for making him take longer than 15 minutes to read a comic. At the same time, the writer and artist realized they had a series that appealed to a growing segment in the mature market, but was being dismissed by the mainstream superhero audience. As a joke, Kaluta asked Epic to run an ad for Starstruck saying, "Readers of The World, Unite! You Have Nothing to Use But Your Brains!", an idea they enjoyed but passed on. Addressing their concern for the future of the series, Lee said: "People have called this a cult book. I hope it's more than that. I hope people will bother to read it and go, 'This is different. Let me give it a try', rather than 'This is different. Let me throw it on the other side of the room from my X-Men comics'". The Epic series was cancelled in 1986 after six issues, and in its wake within the same year, innovative series like Watchmen, The Dark Knight Returns, and Maus earned acclaim and success for the mature qualities and sophisticated innovations that Starstruck was initially resisted for. In the wake of the cancellation, Comics Journal critic Robert Rodi wrote: "That Starstruck should owe more to Gravity's Rainbow and M*A*S*H* than to the Galactus Trilogy means that many people who are exclusively comics-literate won't have the necessary aesthetic vocabulary to read it. But, whose fault is that, if not their own? And whose loss is that, if not their own?" In 1985, Kaluta had predicted: "But they might, years later, pick up (books like Love And Rockets)...and go, 'Damn it, why didn't I read these things back then?' Because they weren't ready for it, right? They weren't ready to be entertained in that sphere of their life". In retrospect, book distributor and art historian Bud Plant hailed the series as "an exotic, erotic, obtuse and wildly humorous space opera".

The recent 2009 IDW remastering of Starstruck has garnered critical acclaim that has bolstered its reputation as a timeless and essential work in the modern comics pantheon. Pop culture critic David Allan Jones wrote of the republished series that it would be a challenge to new readers who would "have to work a little to follow along, but believe me, it's worth it, especially if you enjoy experiencing the unique. A+". Comics reviewer Greg McElhatton wrote "...it's definitely one where a slow burn is going to pay off. Starstruck isn't quite like anything else out there, but I think that's part of the attraction". Joe McCullough of Comics Comics wrote: "In fact, I like literally everything about this cleverly revised, nipped & tucked edition, apportioning and expanding upon Lee's modular, time-skipping vignettes with text features crammed right between the 'main' story and Charles Vess-inked backup material..., creating a kind of call and response between different characters from different points in time, walking you carefully through Lee's collage of varied femininity in a hazardous future. World (universe!) building like you don't see so often...." Alex Dueben of the SuicideGirls site found the series' progressive story and art to be timeless: "Now Starstruck is a pretty nonlinear project, which I love, and I have to say that the structure and the feeling, the complexity, how it moves around, it really feels contemporary". Greg Burgas of Comic Book Resources also concurred with: "It's exciting reading something from 30 years ago and realizing how, even today, it feels ahead of its time".

The British Science Fiction Association's journal Vector listed Starstruck among six groundbreaking comics, and praised it for "...overall myth-building on a par with that of Dune..." Also, much of the praise given to works like Lost and Watchmen featuring "...non-linear graphic storytelling, use of supplement texts for story expansion, overlapping dialogue, unreliable storytelling..." employed these techniques that were pioneered by Starstruck.

Similar praise accompanied the release of the collected IDW remastered issues as the Starstruck Deluxe Edition hardback graphic novel in 2011. Comics media critic Paul Gravett called the collection "a wondrous, ebullient SF epic and it all comes together in this delectable package. Prepare to be transported!" John Hilgart of The Comics Journal considered it an essential classic, advocating that readers should "pick up this book, because not having read it is sort of like not having read Pogo, or listened to Trout Mask Replica, or seen a Hayao Miyazaki film". W. Andrew Shephard of The New Inquiry wrote of the collection: "Starstruck could be both silly and smart, was progressive but unpretentious, and clever but not so impressed with itself that it ever forgot to entertain. IDW's reprint of the series is a service to fans of science fiction, aficionados of comics as an art form, and anyone who loves a good story".

After the Starstruck Deluxe Edition softcover was released in 2012, reviewer Richard Caldwell wrote: "You know how most folks peg the Watchmen as the greatest work of the sequential arts? Yea well, in comparison, this baby is far more progressive, in scope and in message, as it's a magnum opus science fictional tale full of sound and fury, signifying everything to end all magnum opus science fictional tales full of sound and fury, signifying everything".

The Starstruck world was adapted in 2022 in a season of Dimension 20, Dropout's TTRPG actual-play show. The show was notably created by and features Elaine Lee's son Brennan Lee Mulligan as its gamemaster.
