= Eddie Berganza =

American comics writer and editor

- Born: Guatemala
- Areas: Editor, writer

Eddie Berganza (born c. 1965) is an American comics writer and editor, known for his editorial tenure at DC Comics from the early 1990s to the late 2010s, rising at one point to the position of Executive Editor. He was demoted, then terminated in 2017, following sexual harassment allegations.

== Career ==
Berganza was born in Guatemala and moved to the United States at the age of seven. He graduated from Brooklyn College with a Bachelor of Arts in Film and Video Studies.

Berganza began working for DC Comics in the early 1990s, primarily as an editor. He was nominated for the Comics Buyer's Guide Fan Award for Favorite Editor in 1998, 1999, and 2000. He has written for such DC titles as Superman, Batman, Supergirl, Titans, and the Wednesday Comics mini-series and edited numerous comics, such as Infinite Crisis, Final Crisis, Blackest Night, and the year-long maxi-series Brightest Day with Rex Ogle and Adam Schlagman. In December 2010, he was promoted to Executive Editor of DC Comics by Editor-in-Chief Bob Harras.

In 2012, Berganza was demoted to Group Editor after an alleged "series of indiscretions". In 2016, Berganza's name was linked to reports of a DC employee accused of multiple incidents of sexual harassment. DC terminated his employment in November 2017, after BuzzFeed reported that several women had accused him of sexual harassment.

In 2020, following a period in Mexico building homes for the homeless and working as a teacher, Berganza announced the formation of Alternate Empire, a publishing venture with Eric M. Esquivel, whose series Border Town was cancelled by DC in 2018 following sexual harassment allegations.

Preceded by Dan DiDio	DC Universe Executive Editor; 2010–2012	Succeeded by Bobbie Chase
