= Moonstone Books =

American comic book publisher

- Founded: 1995; 31 years ago
- Country of origin: U.S.
- Headquarters location: Chicago, Illinois
- Distribution: Diamond Book Distributors
- Publication types: Comics
- Official website: MoonstoneBooks.com

Moonstone Books is an American comic book, graphic novel, and prose fiction publisher based in Chicago focused on pulp fiction comic books and prose anthologies as well as horror and western tales.

The company began publishing creator-owned comics in 1995, and since 2001 has also published material based on a number of licensed properties, including Zorro, Doc Savage, The Avenger, Buckaroo Banzai, Bulldog Drummond, Kolchak: The Night Stalker, Mr. Moto, Yours Truly, Johnny Dollar, The Phantom, Honey West and several titles based in White Wolf's World of Darkness.

== Participants ==
Moonstone's editor-in-chief is Joe Gentile, who frequently writes his own stories for their comics. Frequent writers, artists, and colorists for their books include Eric M. Esquivel, Dave Ulanski, Mike Bullock, Chuck Dixon, Amin Amat, Ben Raab, Rafael Nieves, Renato Guerra, Peter David, Graham Nolan, David Gallaher, Eric Theriault, EricJ, Nancy Holder, Tom Mandrake, Vatche Mavlian, Richard Dean Starr, Doug Klauba, Paul Storrie, Mike W. Barr, Tom DeFalco, Max Allan Collins, Steve Ellis, Ron Goulart, Ken Wolak and Stefan Petrucha.

Cover to The Phantom #12 by Joe Prado.

== Publications ==
=== The Phantom ===
Moonstone's most successful title is The Phantom, which is based on Lee Falk's superhero comic strip. Moonstone is the first US publisher to produce new Phantom stories for the comic book format since Marvel Comics cancelled their Phantom 2040 comic in 1995.

Moonstone started publishing Phantom graphic novels in 2002. Only five books, written by Tom DeFalco, Ben Raab and Ron Goulart, were published, but in 2003, Moonstone started a regular comic book series with the character, written by Ben Raab, Rafael Nieves, and Chuck Dixon, and drawn by the likes of Pat Quinn, Jerry DeCaire, Nick Derington, Rich Burchett and EricJ. After 11 issues, Mike Bullock took over the book, with Carlos Magno as the regular artist in 2006, leaving the series to finally come out on a more regular schedule.

Moonstone have also made and is in the process of making several special projects with the character. In 2006, a retcon of the Phantom's origin called "Legacy" was published, written by Ben Raab and drawn by Pat Quinn, which aimed to look like one of the Phantom's chronicle books. 2006 also marked the year when Moonstone invented the wide-vision format, introducing it to the world with the Phantom story "Law of the Jungle". Moonstone have also announced a Phantom Annual, and two prose collections featuring Phantom short stories.

The Phantom is Moonstone's best selling title.

=== Moonstone Noir ===
In January 2002, Moonstone Books announced their plans to develop the radio drama Yours Truly, Johnny Dollar as a quarterly book in their Noir Fiction line. This was to be the first graphic novel in the series. It was one of their more faithful and entertaining adaptations of a classic noir character. There is no record of the series continuing.

The creative team consisted of David Gallaher, a former Marvel.com writer/editor, and Eric Theriault, the creator of Veena and Flirt.

=== Moonstone Monsters ===
The licensing rights to publish adaptations of White Wolf Games @ "Classic World of Darkness" has apparently been sold to Vault Comics.

=== Kolchak the Night Stalker ===
Moonstone is publishing new stories based on the TV-series Kolchak: The Night Stalker.

Several graphic novels featuring the character have been published, as well as a regular, ongoing comic book series. A "wide vision" graphic novel has been announced.

=== Buckaroo Banzai ===
Since 2006, Moonstone have been publishing comics with Buckaroo Banzai, the main character from the 1984 film The Adventures of Buckaroo Banzai Across the 8th Dimension, which continues plotlines left unexplored in the movie.

=== Prose anthologies ===
Moonstone recently published a Stoker Award-nominated prose anthology with Kolchak, which sold out fast. Due to the success of the Kolchak collection, Moonstone released two new prose anthologies with The Phantom and The Spider, and announced others featuring The Avenger and one with Doc Savage, as well as two Lone Ranger anthologies.

=== Titles ===
==== Comics ====
Moonstone comics titles include:

- Airboy
- Angeltown: The Nate Hollis Investigations
- Buckaroo Banzai
- Blackest Terror
- Bulldog Drummond
- Boston Blackie
- Captain Action
- The Cisco Kid
- C.L.A.S.H.
- The Domino Lady
- Evilman
- The Hat Squad
- Honey West
- Kolchak the Night Stalker
- Moonstone Monsters
- Mr. Keen
- Mr. Nightmare's Wonderful World
- Pat Novak for Hire
- The Phantom
- Psychotic Reaction'
- Rotten
- The Silencers
- Thor: Unkillable Thunder Christ
- The WhiteWolf Gaming
- Wyatt Earp: Dodge City
- Yours Truly, Johnny Dollar

== Sources ==
- Moonstone Books at the Grand Comics Database
- Moonstone Books at the Comic Book DB (archived from the original)
