= Eric M. Esquivel =

American comic book writer and journalist

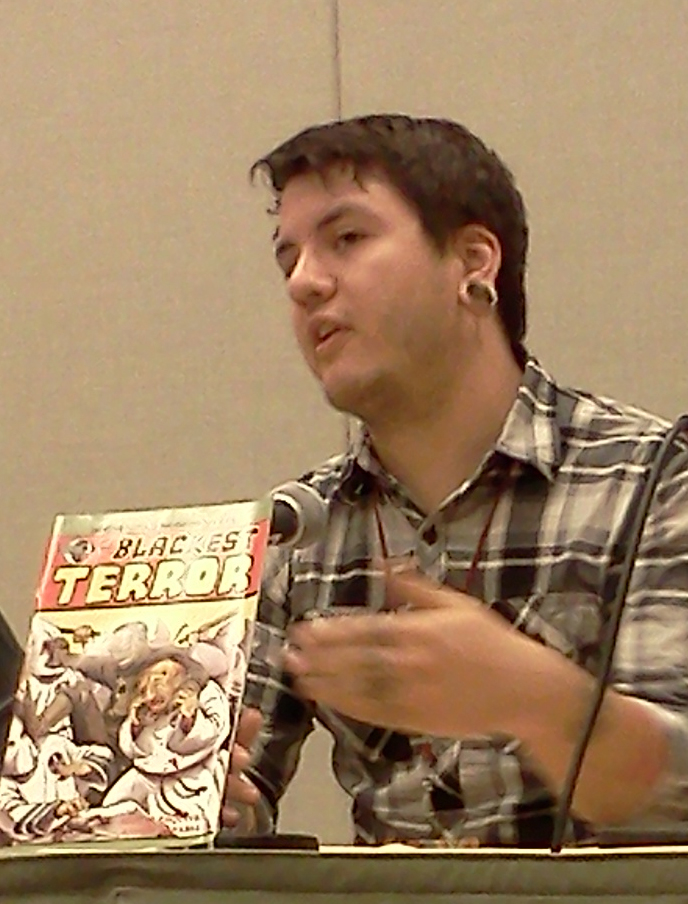
- Esquivel in 2012
- Born: February 10, 1987 (age 39) Gurnee, Illinois, U.S.
- Notable works: Border Town
- Collaborators: Eddie Berganza

Eric Michael Esquivel (born 1987) is a Latino American comic book writer and journalist, known for the 2018 series Border Town, which was cancelled following allegations that he had sexually and emotionally abused a female friend.

== Early life ==
Eric Esquivel was born on February 10, 1987, in Gurnee, Illinois. He is of Irish and Mexican ancestry.

== Career ==
Esquivel has worked as a journalist and critic, writing for such websites as Bleeding Cool, Fox News Latino, Bookmans Entertainment Exchange, and The Tucson Citizen. He has worked as a comics writer for publishers including Archie Comics, Boom Studios, DC Comics, Dynamite, Frederator Books, Heavy Metal, IDW, Papercutz, Scholastic, SBI Press, and Zenescope.

In 2018, Esquivel began writing Border Town, a magic realist comics series with art by Ramon Villalobos, at the center of a relaunch of DC's Vertigo imprint. The series dealt with immigration and Latino identity, for which Esquivel received death threats in advance of its publication. The series was well received by critics, and the first issue went to a second printing after its September 2018 release, to meet retailer demand.

In December 2018, Esquivel was accused by a woman of subjecting her to ongoing sexual and emotional abuse several years previously; he disputed her account of their interaction. His creative collaborators on Border Town (of which four issues had been published) withdrew from the project. DC cancelled the unpublished issues, and accepted retailer returns of those that had been published. DC also cancelled plans for Esquivel to take over writing their superhero Nightwing series.

In 2020, Esquivel announced Alternate Empire, a publishing venture with Eddie Berganza, who had been terminated by DC in 2017 following sexual harassment allegations.

== Bibliography ==
- Childish Delusions of Grandeur and Superiority #1-2
- The Adventures of Bikini Automatic #1 (one-shot)
- Calabrese! #1-2
- Horrible Little People (OGN)
- Reasons Why Superman is Better Than God (mini-comic)
- Awesomenaut (OGN)
- Zombies vs. Cheerleaders #3 (collected in Zombies vs. Cheerleaders Volume One TPB), #4, #5, #7, Volume II #2
- Robot <3 Kaiju (one-shot)
- Girl Scouts in Space (one-shot)
- The Golden Age: Blackest Terror (mini-comic)
- The Golden Age: The Owl (mini-comic)
- Blackest Terror (one-shot)
- Normal #1 ('zine)
- Unite And Take Over: Stories Inspired By The Songs of The Smiths Volume Two (OGN Anthology)
- Thor: Unkillable Thunder Christ (one-shot)
- American History Z (OGN Anthology)
- Electric Youth (one-shot)
- Freelancers #2-6
- Autobiographical-Erotic Asphyxiation (a comic strip, appearing in The Tucson Weekly)
- The Legend Of Oz: The Wicked West Volume Two, #6-8
- The In Crowd #1-4
- The Spider's Web #3
- Smell Ya Later (An ongoing comic strip, appearing in the Tucson Weekly)
- Bravest Warriors #13
- BOO! #3
- Adventure Time #27-28
- Loki: Ragnarok And Roll #1-4
- Grimm Fairy Tales: Wonderland #22-25, Age Of Darkness one-shot
- Grimm Fairy Tales: The Dark Queen (one-shot)
- Sonic the Hedgehog #265
- Mega Man #41-44
- Roberto Roboto Volume One, "Domo Arigato!"
- G.I. Joe - Storm Shadow: 21st Century Boy
- Super Sonic Digest #11
- Border Town #1-6 (issues #5-6 not published)
