= Honey West =

- First appearance: This Girl for Hire (1957)
- Created by: G.G. Fickling
- Portrayed by: Anne Francis (TV series)

In-universe information
- Gender: Female
- Occupation: private detective

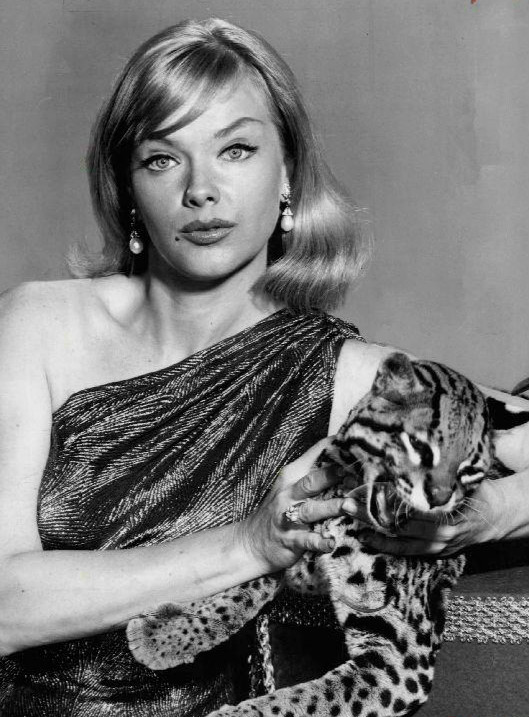

Honey West is a fictional character created by the husband and wife writing team Gloria and Forest Fickling under the pseudonym "G.G. Fickling", and appearing in eleven mystery novels by the duo.

The character is notable as being one of the first female private detectives in popular fiction. She first appeared in the 1957 book This Girl for Hire and would appear in nine novels before being retired in the mid-1960s, with two comeback novels in 1971.

== Creation ==
The Honey West character was created by Gloria and Forrest E. "Skip" Fickling under the pseudonym "G.G. Fickling" in the late 1950s.

Forrest Fickling had been a United States Army Air Forces air gunner during World War II; he enlisted in the U.S. Marine Corps Reserve after the war, and as a member of that service was called back to active duty during the Korean War. The G.G. represented the initials of his wife, Gloria Gautraud, whom he had married in 1949. The initials were used so the sex of the author would remain vague. Though Gloria said that most of the writing was done by Forrest, he said her ideas helped make the female character more plausible and gave her a good dress sense. Gloria had been an assistant fashion editor at Look magazine and a fashion writer for Women's Wear Daily. Forrest told the Los Angeles Times, "I first thought of Marilyn Monroe, and then I thought of [fictional detective] Mike Hammer and decided to put the two together... We thought the most used name for someone you really like is Honey. And she lives in the West, so there was her name."

== Spin-off ==
Private investigator Erik March made his debut in This Girl for Hire. He also has a major role in last novel Stiff as a Broad. Gloria and Forest wrote three Erik March novels in the sixties.

== Prose ==
=== Novels ===
- This Girl for Hire (July 1957)
- A Gun for Honey (July 1958)
- Girl on the Loose (November 1958)
- Honey in the Flesh (May 1959)
- Girl on the Prowl (November 1959)
- Kiss for a Killer (July 1960)
- Dig a Dead Doll (November 1960)
- Blood and Honey (June 1961)
- Bombshell (December 1964)
- Honey on her Tail (February 1971)
- Stiff as a Broad (June 1971)

=== Short story ===
- "The Red Hairing" in Mike Shayne Mystery Magazine (June 1965)

=== Spin-off novels Erik March ===
- Naughty But Dead (1962)
- The Case of the Radioactive Redhead (1963)
- The Crazy Mixed-up Nude (1964)

=== Authorized works by other writers ===
- A Girl and Her Cat a novel by Win Scott Eckert and Matthew Baugh (2014)
- "Seer Sucker" by Will Murray, a short story in Honey West Commemorative Edition (2011)
- Honey West: Honey for Hire a collection of short stories by Joe Gentile, Fernando Ferreiro, Ed Gorman, Mel Odom, Will Murray, Trina Robbins, C. J. Henderson, Mike Black, ed. Nancy Holder (2014)

== Other media ==
=== Television series ===
The character was also the basis for a short-lived ABC TV series in the 1965-66 television season starring Anne Francis and John Ericson. There were 30 episodes. The series was executive produced by Aaron Spelling.

=== Comics ===
Gold Key Comics released a one-shot Honey West comic book in June 1966. In August 2010, Moonstone Books began a Honey West comic book series, written by Trina Robbins with art by Cynthia Martin. Other writers include Elaine Lee and Ronn Sutton. It lasted 7 issues. After which, there were two limited installments, the single issue Honey West and Kolchak (2013), and two issues for Honey West and T.H.E. Cat (2013).

=== Audio ===
In 2011, the AudioComics Company announced plans to adapt Elaine Lee and Ronn Sutton's three-part miniseries Murder on Mars as a full-cast audio drama, in conjunction with Moonstone Books. Starring audio book narrator Carrington MacDuffie as Honey, the adaptation was released on compact disc and digital download in April 2012.

=== Proposed film ===
At various times a proposed film with Reese Witherspoon as Honey West was mentioned, but never made.

== See also ==
- List of female action heroes
