= I-CON =

Former American annual fan convention (1982–2017)

- Status: Reorganizing
- Genre: Fan convention, multi-genre
- Venue: Suffolk County Community College, Grant Campus
- Locations: Brentwood, New York
- Country: United States
- Inaugurated: 1982
- Most recent: 2017
- Organizer: ICON Science Fiction, Inc.
- Filing status: 501(c)(3)
- Website: www.iconsf.org

I-CON (short for "Island CONvention") began as a (roughly) annual fan convention, held on various college campuses in Suffolk County, Long Island, New York. First held in 1982 on the campus of Stony Brook University, I-CON became a very eclectic convention. The programming included things normally found at different types of convention, like speeches by and talks with science fiction authors, extensive gaming, anime fandom, comics fandom, furry fandom, multiple movie showings, and medieval programming, as well as live performances. There was also a science track discussing recent developments in various branches of science and exploring the real science behind science fiction technologies. I-CON was jointly held by ICON Science Fiction, Inc., a tax-exempt educational foundation, and the I-CON Campus Chapter of Stony Brook.

In 2023, the organization began to re-vision itself. The logo changed from the original dragon logo, now associated with the legacy conventions, to one incorporating a Phoenix, as a symbol of the con's rebirth. Instead of one large convention, the organization began experimenting with a series of smaller events in various locations across the island.

== History ==
I-CON was preceded by SUNYcon (April 14, 1973), Mudcon (May 8, 1977), and Brookcon (October 28–30, 1977), held on the Stony Brook campus.

I-CON was held annually from 1983 through 2012 at Stony Brook University, except for 2009, when it relocated temporarily to the Brentwood campus of Suffolk County Community College, due to planned construction at Stony Brook University.

In the spring of 2012, I-CON was informed that the Stony Brook Sports Complex would be unavailable due to construction in 2013. ICON Science Fiction, Inc. scouted several possible locations on Long Island as an alternative venue, eventually entering into an agreement with Hofstra University. Due to many compounding issues including finances and delays caused by Hurricane Sandy, the board decided to postpone I-CON 32, with plans to raise funds via smaller events and return in 2014, but made no announcements about future dates.

I-CON ran smaller conventions, LI-CON, in 2014 and 2015, at other venues on Long Island.

I-CON 32 occurred on March 17–19, 2017, at Suffolk County Community College, Grant Campus, Brentwood, New York.

The website was updated on February 14, 2019 to announce a trip to a library exhibit, having previously been last updated on August 11, 2016.

=== Event history ===
Dates	Location	Guests
March 12–14, 1982	Stony Brook University; Stony Brook, New York	Gene Roddenberry, Alan Asherman, Jack Dann, Gardner Dozois, Raymond Z. Gallun, Michael Kandel, Michael Swanwick, Roy Torgeson, Joan D. Vinge, Howard Weinstein, Nicholas Yermikov
May 6–8, 1983	Stony Brook University; Stony Brook, New York	Isaac Asimov, J O Jeppson, George Takei
March 30 - April 1, 1984	Stony Brook University; Stony Brook, New York	Hal Clement, George Takei, Walter Koenig, Harlan Ellison
March 29–31, 1985	Stony Brook University; Stony Brook, New York	Larry Niven, Mark Lenard, John Buscema, Don Heck, Marv Wolfman, Dennis O'Neil
April 4–6, 1986	Stony Brook University; Stony Brook, New York	Jack Williamson, James Doohan, Jon Pertwee, Julius Schwartz, Forrest J. Ackerman, Norman Spinrad, Bob Rozakis. Mindy Newell
March 27–29, 1987	Stony Brook University; Stony Brook, New York	David Brin, Mark Lenard, David Gerrold, Colin Baker
April 15–17, 1988	Stony Brook University; Stony Brook, New York	Poul Anderson, Adam West, Richard Arnold, Doug Murray (comics), Anthony Ainley, Harlan Ellison
March 31 - April 2, 1989	Stony Brook University; Stony Brook, New York	Frederik Pohl, Michael Dorn, Guy Vardaman, Tasha Martel, Terry Nation, E. Gary Gygax, Peter David
March 30 - April 1, 1990	Stony Brook University; Stony Brook, New York	C. J. Cherryh, Marina Sirtis, John de Lancie, Richard Arnold, Sylvester McCoy, Scott Carpenter, Alan Dean Foster, E. Gary Gygax, Timothy Zahn, Curt Swan, Elliot S. Maggin
April 19–21, 1991	Stony Brook University; Stony Brook, New York	Dan Simmons, Majel Roddenberry, Robin Curtis, Dean Stockwell, Sylvester McCoy, John Levene, Wings Hauser, Deke Slayton, Stan Lee, Sarah Douglas, E. Gary Gygax, Harlan Ellison, Julius Schwartz, Steve Saffell, Charles Pelligrino, George Zebrowski, Pamela Sargent
April 3–5, 1992	Stony Brook University; Stony Brook, New York	Roger Zelazny, Nichelle Nichols, Laura Banks, Sarah Douglas, Tom Kidd, A.C. Farley
April 16–18, 1993	Stony Brook University; Stony Brook, New York	Lucius Shepard, Armin Shimerman, Jon Pertwee, Sylvester McCoy, Jerry Doyle, Mira Furlan, Michael O'Hare, Laura Banks, Bruce Purchase, Jordan Raskin
April 15–17, 1994	Stony Brook University; Stony Brook, New York	Harlan Ellison, George Takei, Lolita Fatjo, Michael O'Hare, J. Michael Straczynski, Michael Cuneo, Tom Palmer
March 31–April 2, 1995	Stony Brook University; Stony Brook, New York	Nancy Kress, Siddig El Fadil, Andrew Robinson, Sophie Aldred, Jerry Doyle, Rachel Pollack
April 12–14, 1996	Stony Brook University; Stony Brook, New York	George Alec Effinger, Ethan Phillips, Bill Mumy, Steve Sansweet, Tom Smith, Peter David, Susan Alston, Mike Stackpole
April 4–6, 1997	Stony Brook University; Stony Brook, New York	Joe Haldeman, René Auberjonois, J. Michael Straczynski, Michael O'Hare, Marvin Kitman
March 27–29, 1998	Stony Brook University; Stony Brook, New York	Norman Spinrad, Nana Visitor, Claudia Christian
April 9–11, 1999	Stony Brook University; Stony Brook, New York	Lois McMaster Bujold, Robert Picardo, Kenny Baker, Sylvester McCoy, Caroline Blakiston, Harlan Ellison
March 31–April 2, 2000	Stony Brook University; Stony Brook, New York	Joe R. Lansdale, Nicholas Brendon, Mark Allen Shepherd, Jason Carter, Julie Caitlin Brown, Jack Stauffer, Richard Hatch, Richard Chevolleau, Robert Leeshock, Peter Woodward, Dr. Demento
March 30–April 1, 2001	Stony Brook University; Stony Brook, New York	Timothy Zahn, Majel Barrett-Roddenberry, Bruce Campbell, Harlan Ellison, Brad Douriff, Erin Gray, Virginia Hey, Richard Herd, Ray Harryhausen, Marjorie Monaghan
April 19–21, 2002	Stony Brook University; Stony Brook, New York	F. Paul Wilson, Billy Boyd, Richard Biggs, Andreas Katsulas, Julie Caitlin Brown, Jason Carter, Herbert Jefferson Jr., Brian Downey, Myriam Sirois
March 28–30, 2003	Stony Brook University; Stony Brook, New York	Barry N. Malzberg, Don Davis, Carrie Dobro, Carel Struycken, Robert Leeshock, Robin Curtis, Keith Hamilton Cobb, Keith R.A. DeCandido
March 26–28, 2004	Stony Brook University; Stony Brook, New York	Connie Willis, Katee Sackhoff, Peter Jurasik, Vaughn Armstrong, Chase Masterson, Richard Hatch, Bill Blair, Keith R.A. DeCandido, John Kenneth Muir
April 8–10, 2005	Stony Brook University; Stony Brook, New York	Ben Bova, Jewel Staite, Peter Mayhew, Jason Carter, Rockne S. O'Bannon
March 24–26, 2006	Stony Brook University; Stony Brook, New York	Terry Brooks, George Takei, Terry Brooks, Kevin Sorbo, Ron Glass, Michael A. Pondsmith, Michael Uslan, Doctor Who: Podshock
March 23–25, 2007	Stony Brook University; Stony Brook, New York	Liz Williams, Claudia Christian, Denise Crosby, Dean Haglund, Jamie Bamber, Roger Corman, Doctor Who: Podshock
April 4–6, 2008	Stony Brook University; Stony Brook, New York	Charlaine Harris, Tracy Scoggins, Ray Park, Harlan Ellison, Ernie Hudson, Daniel Logan, Billy West, Jeffrey Combs, Doctor Who: Podshock, David Wade
April 3–5, 2009	Suffolk County Community College, Grant Campus; Brentwood, New York	Sean Astin, Sala Baker, Nicki Clyne, Tory Belleci, Gary Graham
March 26–28, 2010	Stony Brook University; Stony Brook, New York	Robert J. Sawyer, Charisma Carpenter, Sarah Douglas, Tiffany Grant, Ronald D. Moore, Robert J. Sawyer, Tony Todd, Doctor Who: Podshock
April 15–17, 2011	Stony Brook University; Stony Brook, New York	Joe R. Lansdale, Julie Benz, Thomas Jane, Denise Crosby, Nicki Clyne, Frank Mentzer, Daniel Logan, Gil Gerard
March 30 - April 1, 2012	Stony Brook University; Stony Brook, New York	David Weber, Paul McGann, Daphne Ashbrook, Sarah Douglas, Frazer Hines, Jeremy Bulloch, Nana Visitor, Rekha Sharma, Paul Blake, Colin Spaull, Casey Biggs, JG Hertzler, Robert Leeshock, Joshua Lou Friedman, Jason Haigh-Ellery
March 17–19, 2017	Suffolk County Community College, Grant Campus; Brentwood, New York	Cory Doctorow, Cecil Baldwin, Daniel Knauf, David Gerrold, Tiffany Grant...

=== LI-CON ===
Dates	Location	Guests
March 29–30, 2014	Best Western Mill River Manor; Rockville Centre, NY	
August 14–16, 2015	Clarion Hotel and Conference Center; Ronkonkoma, NY	
