= Michael Kaluta =

American comics artist (born 1947)

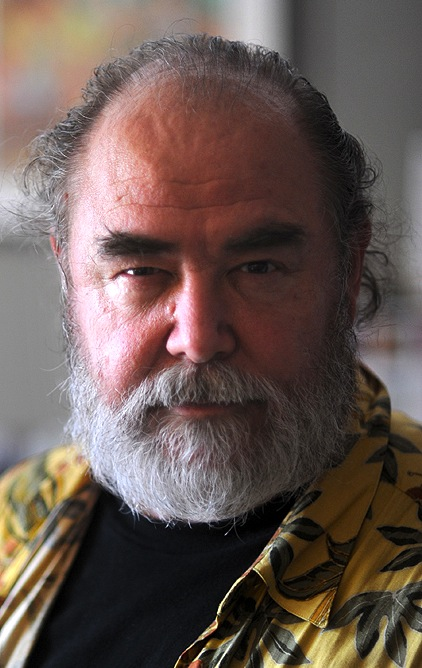
- Born: August 25, 1947 (age 79) Guatemala
- Areas: Penciller, Inker
- Pseudonym: Mike Kaluta
- Notable works: The Shadow; Starstruck
- Awards: Shazam Award for Outstanding New Talent 1971; Inkpot Award 1977; Spectrum Award for Grand Master 2003

Michael William Kaluta, sometimes credited as Mike Kaluta or Michael Wm. Kaluta (born August 25, 1947), is an American comics artist and writer best known for his acclaimed 1970s adaptation of the pulp magazine hero The Shadow with writer Dennis O'Neil. He is the godfather of comedian and gamemaster Brennan Lee Mulligan.

== Early life ==
Born in Guatemala to U.S. citizens, Kaluta studied at the Richmond Professional Institute (now Virginia Commonwealth University).

== Career ==
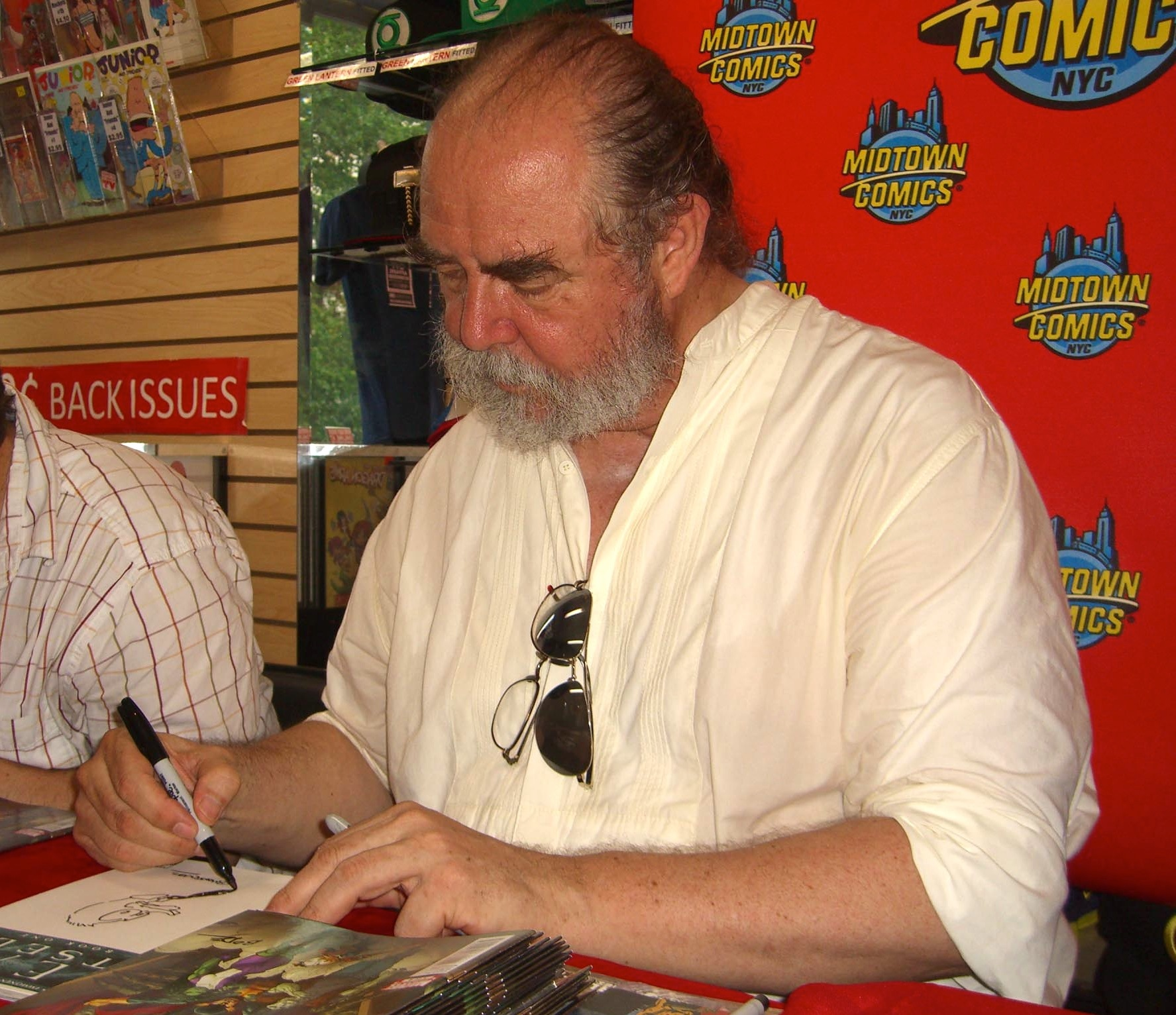
Kaluta sketching Howard the Duck on a copy of Fear Itself: Fearsome Four, at a June 8, 2011 Midtown Comics appearance

Kaluta's early work included a three-page adventure story, "The Battle of Shiraz", in Charlton Comics Flash Gordon #18 (Jan. 1970) and an adaptation of Edgar Rice Burroughs's Carson of Venus novels for DC Comics.

Kaluta's influences and style are drawn from pulp illustrations of the 1930s and the turn-of-the-century poster work of Alphonse Mucha – his signature motif is elaborate decorative panel designs – rather than the comic books of the Silver Age. He has rarely worked with the superhero genre, although one of his early contributions for DC was a "World of Krypton" backup story in Superman #240 (July 1971).

His first cover for a comic book was House of Mystery #200 (March 1972). Associated during the 1970s with Bernie Wrightson and Jeffrey Jones, he contributed illustrations to Ted White's Fantastic and Amazing Stories. Kaluta co-created Eve in Secrets of Sinister House #6 (Aug.–Sept. 1972), a horror comics "host" character later turned into a supporting character in The Sandman. He and writer Dennis O'Neil produced a comics adaptation of The Shadow for DC in 1973–1974. Comics historian Les Daniels noted that "Kaluta's style [on The Shadow] is an homage to Graves Gladney, master of the pulp magazine covers of the 1930s." Kaluta left the series after drawing five of the first six issues.

Kaluta was one of the four comic book artists/fine illustrator/painters (along with Jeffrey Jones, Barry Windsor-Smith, and Bernie Wrightson) who formed the artists' commune The Studio in a loft in Manhattan's Chelsea district in 1975 and continuing to 1979. In addition to many comic book stories and covers, Kaluta has done a wide variety of book illustrations.

Kaluta drew the cover for the Madame Xanadu one-shot in 1981 which was DC's second direct sales only comic. He and writer Elaine Lee crafted Marvel Graphic Novel #13 "Starstruck: The Luckless, the Abandoned and Forsaked" which led to an ongoing series which ran for six issues. Kaluta and O'Neil reunited on The Shadow: 1941 – Hitler's Astrologer graphic novel published in 1988. In 2006, Kaluta was one of the artists on the 1001 Nights of Snowfall graphic novel written by Bill Willingham.

In 1984 he drew the illustrations for and directed the music video of "Don't Answer Me" by The Alan Parsons Project, which became one of the most requested videos of the year on the cable video channel MTV.

Among music fans, Kaluta is known as the cover artist of Glenn Danzig's instrumental album Black Aria and for the interior illustration of Danzig's fourth album, the latter of which appeared in 1994 and 1995 as a pendant sold at Danzig concerts, and on Danzig T-shirts and sweaters produced in the same period. Kaluta created the CD covers and interior booklet illustrations for Nativity in Black I and II, tribute albums to the music of Black Sabbath. Kaluta drew the cover art for the Bobby Pickett album The Original Monster Mash when it was reissued in 1973.

Kaluta has worked for role-playing game companies such as White Wolf Publishing. He has done artwork for collectible card games companies, including a comic book for Wizards of the Coast's Magic: The Gathering and illustrating cards on Last Unicorn Games' Heresy: Kingdom Come.

In the early 1990s, he was active in Compuserve's Macintosh Gaming Forum, in the flight simulator enthusiast group which called itself VFA-13 Shadow Riders. He contributed a number of designs for airplane nose art and flight suit unit patches.

== Awards ==
Kaluta's work has won him a good deal of recognition, including the Shazam Award for Outstanding New Talent in 1971, the Inkpot Award in 1977, and the 2003 Spectrum Award for Grand Master.

== Bibliography ==
=== Dark Horse Comics ===
- Conan #22 (with Cary Nord) (2005)
- The Shadow #1–2 (1994)
- The Shadow: In the Coils of Leviathan #1–4 (1993–94)
- Starstruck #1–4 (miniseries) (1990)

=== DC Comics ===
- Action Comics Weekly (cover) #613 (1988)
- Adventure Comics (cover) #425 (1972)
- Aquaman, vol. 3 (covers) #63–75 (2000–01)
- Aquaman, vol. 4 (cover) #51 (2007)
- Batman (covers) #242, 248, 253 (1972–73); #400 (one page interior art); Annual #12, 24 (1988–2000)
- The Batman Chronicles (cover) #6 (1996)
- Batman Family (covers) #17, 19 (1978)
- Batman: Gotham Knights (Batman Black and White) #32 (2002)
- The Brave and the Bold (cover) #176 (1981)
- The Brave and the Bold, vol. 3 (cover) #26 (2009)
- Detective Comics (covers) #423–424, 426–429, 431, 434, 438 (1972–74); #572 (1987)
- Doorway to Nightmare (covers) #2–5 (1978)
- Forbidden Tales of Dark Mansion (covers) #7–8, 13 (1972–73)
- From Beyond the Unknown (covers) #18–19 (1972)
- Ghosts (covers) #7, 93, 101 (1972–81)
- House of Mystery (interiors): #195, 200; (covers): #201–202, 210, 212, 233, 260–261, 263, 265, 267–268, 273, 276, 284, 287–288, 293–295, 300, 302, 304–305, 309–321 (1971–83)
- House of Secrets (interiors): #87, 98; (covers): #101–102, 149, 151, 154 (1970–78)
- Just Imagine Stan Lee with Joe Kubert creating Batman (four pages) (2001)
- Justice League of America (cover) #154 (1978)
- Korak, Son of Tarzan #46–53 ("Carson of Venus" series) (1972–74)
- Madame Xanadu (cover) #1 (1981)
- Mystery in Space vol. 4 #1 (2012)
- Phantom Stranger, vol. 2 ("Spawn of Frankenstein") #23–25; (cover) #26 (1973)
- Private Files of the Shadow HC (cover and new 15-page story) (1989)
- Secrets of Haunted House (covers) #8, 10–11, 14, 16, 29 (1977–80)
- The Shadow (interiors): #1–4, 6; (covers): #10–12 (1973–75)
- Spectre, vol. 2 (covers) #1–3 (1987)
- Spectre, vol. 3 (covers) #10, 44 (1993–96)
- The Spirit, vol. 2, #5 (2010)
- Superman ("Fabulous World of Krypton") #240 (1972); (Superman) #400 (six pages, among other artists, 1984)
- Tarzan #230 ("Carson of Venus" series) (1974)
- Time Warp (covers) #1–5 (1979–80)
- Weird Mystery Tales #24 (1975)
- Weird War Tales #12 (cover) (1973)
- Weird Worlds (interiors): #4; (covers): #5–6, 10 (1972–74)
- Wonder Woman (cover) #297, (pinup page) #300 (1982–83)

==== America's Best Comics ====
- Tom Strong's Terrific Tales #9 (2004)

==== Vertigo ====
- The Books of Magic vol. 2 (covers) #22, 27–40, 42–65, 67–75 (1996–2000)
- House of Mystery vol. 2 #20 (2010)
- Madame Xanadu, vol. 2 #11–15 (2008–09)
- The Unwritten #31.5 (2012)
- Weird War Tales #2 (cover) (1997)

=== Marvel Comics ===
- Chaos War: Chaos King (2010)
- Conan the Barbarian (cover) #167 (1985)
- Conan the King, then King Conan (covers) #20–27, 31 (1984–85)
- Epic Illustrated #17, 21, 24, 25–26, 28 (1983–85)
- Fearsome Four, miniseries, #1 (among other artists) (2011)
- The Shadow 1941: Hitler's Astrologer, graphic novel (1988)
- Thor vol. 2 #57 (two pages only, among other artists) (2003)

=== Other publishers ===
- Dangerous Times #1 (cover) (1989) Evolution Comics
- Memorial #1–6 (covers) (2011–12) (IDW Publishing)
- Rocketeer Adventure Magazine #1–2 (1988) (Comico)

=== Books and compilations ===
- Michael Wm. Kaluta Sketchbook 180 pages, Kitchen Sink Press, May 1998, ISBN 978-0-87816-115-7
- Echoes Drawing of Michael Wm Kaluta 112 pages, Vanguard Productions, March 2007, ISBN 978-1-887591-13-3
- Wings of Twilight: The Art of Michael Kaluta 80 pages, NBM Publishing, March 2001, ISBN 978-1-56163-276-3
- The Michael Kaluta Treasury Glimmer Graphics, December 1988, ISBN 978-0-9621421-0-9
- Michael Wm. Kaluta: Sketchbook Series
  - Volume 1 48 pages, IDW Publishing, April 2012, ISBN 978-1-61377-136-5
  - Volume 2 48 pages, IDW Publishing, August 2012, ISBN 978-1-61377-355-0
  - Volume 3 48 pages, IDW Publishing, December 2012, ISBN 978-1-61377-536-3
  - Volume 4 48 pages, IDW Publishing, May 2013, ISBN 978-1-61377-638-4
- Michael Wm. Kaluta: The Big Book 304 pages, IDW Publishing, January 2014, ISBN 978-1-61377-682-7

Preceded by n/a	The Shadow artist 1973–1974	Succeeded by Frank Robbins
