= Luna (name) =

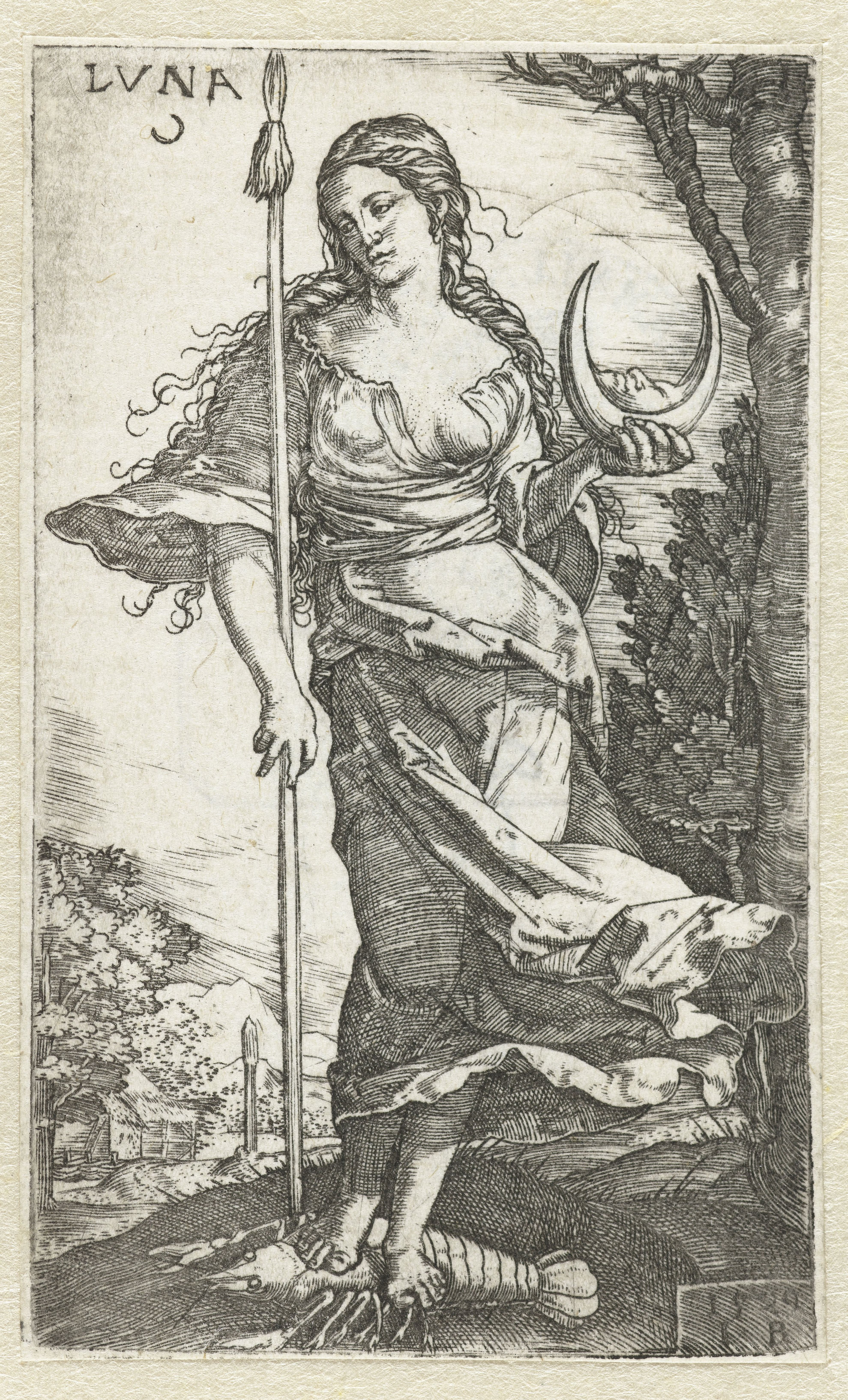
- Diana als Luna (1529). The word lūna, which means Moon in Latin, is the origin of the given name Luna.
- Pronunciation: /ˈluːnə/
- Gender: Female

Origin
- Origin: Latin, Chinese
- Meaning: Moon
- Region of origin: Italy

Other names
- Alternative spelling: Latin: Lūna
- Variant forms: Louna, Luneth, Lunetta, Lunette, Lunneta, Lunara, Loona
- Derived: Moon, Various(Chinese)
- Related names: Altalune, Runa

Luna is a feminine given name of Latin origin, meaning moon. In Roman mythology, Luna was the divine personification of the Moon.

== Usage ==
It first entered the top 1,000 most popular names for girls list in the United States in 2003, has ranked among the top 20 names there since 2019 and was the 10th most popular name for American girls born in 2022. It is also well used in other countries. It ranked among the top 100 names for girls in Australia, Belgium, Canada, Chile, Denmark, France, Croatia, Ireland, Italy, the Netherlands, New Zealand, Norway, Portugal, Slovenia, Spain, Sweden, Switzerland and the United Kingdom, among others, in recent years. In 2022, it was the 31st most popular name given to girls in Canada. The name's popularity has been attributed to its use in J.K. Rowling's Harry Potter series, as well as its usage by celebrities. Names beginning with or containing the letter L have also been particularly fashionable for girls.

It is also found as a surname, sometimes with a prefix, such as de Luna. The similar sounding Runa has been used in at least one instance as a non-standard pronunciation in Japan for the kanji 月, meaning moon. Other standard pronunciations for the kanji include Tsuki and Getsu, while non-standard pronunciations include Oto, Su, Zuki and Mori.

The name consistently ranks as the #1 or within the top 5 of cat names by usage in multiple countries, especially for females. It is also a very popular female dog name.

In China, it can also be written as 璐娜 (Lùnà).

== People with this name ==
=== Given name ===
- Luna (footballer) (born 1971), Spanish association football player, also known as Paco Luna
- Luna (Polish singer) (born 1999 as Aleksandra Katarzyna Wielgomas)
- Luna (South Korean singer) (born 1993 as Park Sunyoung)
- Luna (Ukrainian singer) (born 1990 as Krystyna Viktorivna Bardash)
- Luna Blaise (born 2001), American actress and singer
- Luna Kamau, Kenyan public health scientist
- Luna Leopold (1915–2006), American scientist
- Luna Maya (born 1983), Indonesian model, actress, and presenter
- Luna Solomon (born 1996), Eritrean sport-shooter
- Luna Vachon (1962–2010), Canadian professional wrestler
- Luna Voce (born 1988), Dutch-Italian model and beauty pageant titleholder
- Luna Wedler (born 1999), Swiss actress
- Luna, Swedish 9-year-old assault victim.
- Tao Luna (陶璐娜, 1974~), Chinese sports shooter
- Wang Luna (王璐娜, 1980~), Chinese swimmer

=== Surname ===
- Alejandro Luna (1939–2022), Mexican scenic designer and lighting technician
- Alex Luna (Ukrainian singer) (born 1986), Ukrainian countertenor
- Alex Luna (footballer) (born 2004), Argentine attacking midfielder
- Álvaro de Luna, 1st Duke of Trujillo (c. 1389–1453), Spanish politician
- Anna Paulina Luna (born 1989), U.S. Congresswoman
- Antonio Luna (1866–1899), Filipino general
- Antonio Luna (footballer) (born 1991), Spanish footballer
- Argentino Luna (1941–2011), Argentine musician
- Audrey Luna, American operatic soprano
- Betty Luna (1927–2004), All-American Girls Professional Baseball League pitcher
- Braulio Luna (born 1974), Mexican association football player
- Cardozo M. Luna (born 1953), Philippine politician
- Carlos Luna (artist) (born 1969), Cuban-American artist
- Carlos Luna (footballer) (born 1982), Argentine footballer
- Carlos Luna (volleyball) (born 1981), Venezuelan Olympic volleyball player
- Daniel Luna (born 2003), Colombian footballer
- Diego Luna (born 1979), Mexican actor, director and producer
- Diego Luna (footballer, born 2000), Venezuelan football centre-back for Deportivo La Guaira
- Diego Luna (soccer, born 2003), American soccer midfielder for Real Salt Lake
- Emerico Luna (1882–1963), Italian anatomist
- Félix Luna (1925–2009), Argentine writer, lyricist and historian
- Francisco Luna Kan (1925–2023), Mexican politician
- Gabriel Luna (born 1982), American film, television, and stage actor
- Genaro García Luna (born 1968), Mexican politician
- Héctor Luna (born 1980), Dominican baseball player
- Ismael Luna (born 2000), American politician in Wisconsin
- Jeff de Luna (born 1984), Filipino pool player
- Jonathan Luna (1965–2003), U.S. Federal prosecutor
- Jovita Luna (1924–2006), Argentine singer and actress
- Josep Joan Bigas i Luna (1946–2013), Spanish film director
- Juan Luna (1857–1899), Filipino painter
- Julio César Luña (born 1973), Venezuelan weightlifter
- Kat DeLuna (born 1987), American singer of Dominican descent
- Martha Luna, Venezuelan fashion designer and stylist
- Mauro Luna Diale (born 1999), Argentine professional footballer
- Nicholas Luna, personal assistant to Donald Trump
- Pauleen Luna (born 1988), Filipino actress and host
- Pedro de Luna (1328–1423), Avignon Pope Benedict XIII
- Pelagio Luna (1867–1919), Argentine politician
- Pilar Luna (1944–2020), Mexican archaeologist
- Santiago Luna (born 1962), Spanish professional golfer
- Sebastián Luna (born 1987), Argentine professional footballer
- Segundo Luna (1902–?), Argentine professional footballer
- Silvina Luna (1980–2023), Argentine model
- Solomon Luna (1858–1912), American rancher and banker
- Tristán de Luna y Arellano (1519–1571), Spanish Conquistador

== Fictional characters ==
- Luna (Sailor Moon), supporting character in the Sailor Moon franchise
- Luna Lovegood, in the Harry Potter series
- Luna (Yu-Gi-Oh! 5D's), supporting character in the anime series Yu-Gi-Oh! 5D's
- Luna, the Moon and one of the main characters from the educational children's television series Bear in the Big Blue House
- Luna, in the animated series Earth to Luna!
- Luna, a Nightblood in the TV series The 100
- Luna, a character in the TV series One Life to Live
- Luna, a character from the visual novel video game Zero Escape: Virtue's Last Reward
- Luna, a character from the video game Dota 2
- Luna, a character from the video game Omega Strikers
- Luna, one of the two playable protagonists from the video game Nikoderiko: The Magical World
- Luna, in the video game Shrek Super Slam
- Luna Snow, a Marvel character
- Luna, a character in Dead or Alive Xtreme Venus Vacation
- Luna, in the video game Animal Crossing
- Luna Girl, a child villain in PJ Masks
- Luna Inverse, in the anime, manga and novel series Slayers
- Luna Loud, in the American animated series The Loud House
- Marisol Luna, American Girl character, "Girl of the Year" for 2005
- Luna Maximoff, supporting character in the Marvel Comics universe
- Luna Mothews, in Monster High
- Lunafreya Nox Fleuret (also known simply as Luna), a key character in Final Fantasy XV
- Luna O'Neill (born Liam), the title character of the novel Luna
- Princess Luna in The Adventures of Peter Pan
- Princess Luna in My Little Pony: Friendship Is Magic
- Queen Luna, in Winx Club
- Luna Valente, the titular protagonist of the Argentine-Mexican Disney Channel Latin America telenovela Soy Luna
- Luna, a member of the fictional girl group The Hex Girls, from the Scooby-Doo series
- Luna the Moon from Let's Go Luna!
- Luna, the main character from the children's TV series Pupstruction
- Luna, a character in the film The Expendables 3 played by Ronda Rousey
- Luna, a silkwing in Wings of fire book series
- Luna Child from Touhou Sangetsusei in the Touhou Project video game series
- Alejandro 'Alex' Luna (Axo), a Marvel Comics character

== See also ==
- Luna (goddess), the ancient Roman divine personification of the Moon
- The Moon, Earth's only natural satellite, known as Luna in Latin and other languages
