= Rune (given name) =

- Gender: unisex

Origin
- Origin: Old Norse
- Meaning: "Rune", "Sun"
- Region of origin: Scandinavia

Other names
- Related names: Runa (feminine)

Rune is a unisex given name in English speaking nations as well as Thailand, though it is predominantly masculine in Europe. The name is derived from the Old Norse word rún, meaning "secret" or the "sun". It is earliest attested in a runestone as Runi. Culturally, the name Rune resonates with themes of mysticism and the arcane, often associated with Norse mythology and the broader Germanic tradition. It is a common name in Norway, Sweden, and Denmark, and popular in Belgium, where it ranked in top thirty names for baby boys in 2006 and was the tenth most popular name for boys in 2006 in the Flemish Region of Belgium. Rúni, a variant of the name, was among the ten most popular names given to baby boys in the Faroe Islands, Denmark, in 2007. The name Rune was first recorded in the United States in 2001 and has since been most popular in California, Ohio, Washington, Arizona, and Oregon. There were 623 people given the name Rune in the United States from 2001-2024. In the past 5 years the name Rune has been trending up compared to the previous 5 years with only a slightly higher percentage of boys claiming the name than girls. Notable people with the name include:

== Arts and entertainment ==
- Rune Johan Andersson (born 1945), Norwegian cartoonist, illustrator and children's writer
- Rune Andréasson (1925–1999), Swedish comics artist
- Rune Angell-Jacobsen (born 1947), Norwegian novelist
- Rune Christiansen (born 1963), Norwegian poet and novelist
- Rune Ericson (1924–2015), Swedish cinematographer
- Rune Eriksen (born 1975), Norwegian metal musician
- Rune Gustafsson (1933–2012), Swedish jazz guitarist
- Rune Halvarsson (1911–1969), Swedish actor
- Rune Hassner (1928–2003), Swedish photographer and film director
- Rune T. Kidde (1957–2013), Danish writer and musician
- Rune Klakegg (born 1955), Norwegian jazz pianist and composer
- Rune Klan (born 1976), Danish comedian and magician
- Rune Reilly Kölsch (born 1977), Danish techno musician
- Rune Kristoffersen (born 1957), Norwegian musician
- Rune Larsen (born 1948), Norwegian singer
- Rune Lindblad (1923–1991), Swedish composer
- Rune Lindstrøm (born 1963), Norwegian drummer
- Rune Lindström (screenwriter) (1916–1973), Swedish screenwriter and actor
- Rune Rebellion (born 1965), Norwegian rock guitarist
- Rune Rudberg (born 1961), Norwegian singer
- Rune Temte (born 1965), Norwegian actor
- Rune Waldekranz (1911–2003), Swedish film producer
- Rune Westberg (born 1974), Danish songwriter and producer

== Politics ==
- Rune Berglund (born 1939), Swedish politician
- Rune Bønnelykke (born 1972), Danish politician
- Rune Fredh (1945–2006), Norwegian politician
- Rune Gerhardsen (1946–2021), Norwegian politician
- Rune Gustavsson (1920–2002), Swedish politician
- Rune B. Johansson (1915–1982), Swedish politician
- Rune E. Kristiansen (born 1948), Norwegian politician
- Rune Lund (born 1976), Danish politician
- Rune Midtun (born 1973), Norwegian politician
- Rune Resaland (born 1956), Norwegian diplomat
- Rune Selj (born 1952), Norwegian politician
- Rune J. Skjælaaen (born 1954), Norwegian politician

== Sports ==
- Rune Åhlund (1930–2019), Swedish long-distance runner
- Rune Almén (born 1952), Swedish high jumper
- Rune Andersson (rower) (1930–2006), Swedish rower
- Rune Andersson (sport shooter) (1919–1992), Swedish sports shooter
- Rune Berger (born 1978), Norwegian footballer
- Rune Bratseth (born 1961), Norwegian footballer
- Rune Dahl (born 1955), Norwegian rower
- Rune Dahmke (born 1993), German handball player
- Rune Dalsjø (born 1975), Norwegian rally driver
- Rune Djurhuus (born 1970), Norwegian chess player
- Rune Emanuelsson (1923–1993), Swedish footballer
- Rune Erland (born 1968), Norwegian handball player
- Rune Ertsås (born 1987), Norwegian footballer
- Rune Flodman (1926–2014), Swedish sport shooter
- Rune Frantsen (born 1991), Danish footballer
- Rune Glifberg (born 1974), Danish professional skateboarder
- Rune Gulliksen (born 1963), Norwegian ice hockey player
- Rune Gustafsson (athlete) (1919–2011), Swedish middle-distance runner
- Rune Hagen (born 1975), Norwegian footballer
- Rune Hammarström (1920–1999), Swedish speed skater
- Rune Hastrup (born 1991), Danish footballer
- Rune Hauge (born 1954), Norwegian football agent
- Rune Haugseng (born 1970), Norwegian handball player
- Rune Hermans (born 1999), Belgian female gymnast
- Rune Herregodts (born 1998), Belgian racing cyclist
- Rune Holta (born 1973), Norwegian speedway rider
- Rune Høydahl (born 1969), Norwegian mountain biker
- Rune Jansson (1932–2018), Swedish wrestler
- Rune Jarstein (born 1984), Norwegian footballer
- Rune Jogert (born 1977), Norwegian racing cyclist
- Rune Johansson (1920–1998), Swedish sportsperson
- Rune Johnsson (born 1933), Swedish wrestler
- Rune Kristiansen (born 1964), Norwegian freestyle skier
- Rune Lange (born 1977), Norwegian footballer
- Rune Larsson (disambiguation), multiple people
- Rune Lindström (alpine skier) (born 1944), Swedish former alpine skier
- Rune Lorentsen (born 1961), Norwegian wheelchair curler
- Rune Ohm (born 1980), Danish handball player
- Rune Olijnyk (born 1968), Norwegian ski jumper
- Rune Ottesen (born 1954), Norwegian footballer
- Rune Pedersen (disambiguation), multiple people
- Rune Skarsfjord (born 1970), Norwegian football coach
- Rune Skjærvold (born 1974), Norwegian handball player
- Rune Sola (born 1985), Norwegian speedway rider
- Rune Stordal (born 1979), Norwegian speed skater
- Rune Ulsing (born 1984), Danish badminton player
- Rune Ulvestad (born 1957), Norwegian footballer

== Other ==
- Rune Elmqvist (1906–1996), Swedish inventor
- Rune Gjeldnes (born 1971), Norwegian adventurer
- Rune Ottosen (born 1950), Norwegian academic
- Rune Skarstein (born 1940), Norwegian radical economist
- Rune Slagstad (born 1945), Norwegian historian
