= List of PJ Masks episodes =

PJ Masks is an animated television series produced by Entertainment One, Hasbro, FrogBox, TeamTO, the Walt Disney Company EMEA, France Télévisions, and TF1 Group. The series is based on the Les Pyjamasques book series by Romuald Racioppo. The series debuted on Disney Channel and Disney Junior in the United States on 18 September 2015.

== Series overview ==
Series	Segments	Episodes	Originally released	
Series	Segments	Episodes	First released	Last released
1	52	26	18 September 2015	17 February 2017
2	50	26	15 January 2018	22 March 2019
3	48	26	19 April 2019	13 March 2020
4	48	26	15 May 2020	7 June 2021
5	44	25	13 August 2021	18 November 2022
6	39	23	19 April 2023	15 April 2024

== Episodes ==
=== Season 1 (2015–17) ===
No. overall	No. in season	Title	Directed by	Written by	Storyboard by	Original release date	U.S. viewers (millions)
1a	1a	"Blame it on the Train, Owlette"	Christian De Vita	Sascha Paladino; Head writer : Marc Seal	Christian De Vita	18 September 2015	0.89
By day, Amaya is excited to ride on a new train ride, and she has some trouble remembering to be composed. Then the children notice the train has been stolen. By night, it is revealed that Romeo has removed and transformed the train to catch his delinquent mobile lab. Owlette continues to rush into circumstances in order to make the team finish their mission faster, further complicating it.
1b	1b	"Catboy's Cloudy Crisis"	Christian De Vita	Lisa Akhurst; Head writer : Marc Seal	Edouard Charles	18 September 2015	0.89
By day, Connor, Greg, and Amaya play a game of tag, but then Greg and Amaya decide to play in the sprinklers instead. Due to Connor's aquaphobia, he won't approach them. The water pipes stop and clouds come out instead, making the weather cold. By night, Luna Girl uses her Luna-Magnet to summon clouds. Catboy has to overcome his aquaphobia in order to save the day.
2a	2a	"Owlette and the Flash Flip Trip"	Christian De Vita	Lisa Akhurst; Head writer : Marc Seal	Alexandre Hesse	18 September 2015	0.65
By day, Connor, Greg, and Amaya are getting ready for storytime in class, but Amaya is preoccupied with a comic novel protagonist named Flossy Flash. When Connor, Greg, and Amaya enter the classroom, they discover that all the books have images of Romeo. By nightfall, Romeo has replaced every book's pages and covers with pictures of himself, thanks to his new "servant": Robot. Owlette tries to use Flossy Flash's super skills to stop Romeo from entering the library and the city's most well-known books, but she makes the mission harder because she does not have Flossy Flash's powers.
2b	2b	"Catboy and the Pogo-Dozer"	Christian De Vita	Tom Stevenson; Head writer : Marc Seal	Alban Rodriguez	18 September 2015	0.65
By day, Connor, Greg, and Amaya visit the museum's science fair room and notice a crane game. Greg wants to play, but Connor always goes first. Amaya notices a crack in the wall, stating that they've been fixing up the museum for months. By night, Romeo tries to knock down the wall to get the jetpack to stink up the chimneys with his most current invention: the Sniff-O-Whiff. Gekko breaks off a piece of Romeo's bulldozer and makes a functioning pogo-stick out of it, calling it a Pogo-Dozer. Once Owlette gets stuck on Romeo's laboratory, Gekko attempts to ride the Pogo-Dozer to save her, but Catboy always uses it first, not giving Gekko a chance.
3a	3a	"Gekko and the Super Ninjalinos"	Christian De Vita	Simon Nicholson; Head writer : Marc Seal	Alexandre Hesse	25 September 2015	1.06
By day, Connor, Greg, and Amaya get ready to go to the playground for Sports Day. Greg wants to be powerful in the daytime. But when they went to the park, they discovered that the sports equipment was stolen. At night, Night Ninja had stolen the sports equipment to make his Ninjalinos super active. Gekko wants to get the material by himself. Catboy and Owlette tried to support him, but Gekko wants to demonstrate that he is super strong by defeating the Ninjalinos and getting the sports equipment by himself.
3b	3b	"Owlette's Terrible Pterodactyl Trouble"	Christian De Vita	Gerard Foster; Head writer : Marc Seal	Thomas Buron	25 September 2015	1.06
By day, the gang visits the museum to see the dinosaur exhibits. Connor scared Amaya with a T-Rex cutout. Amaya was very mad at him. Connor told Amaya that he was trying to be funny, but Amaya didn't think it was funny. Then Greg notices the pterodactyl figure was missing. By night, it was Romeo who stole it and made it fly. Catboy tries to get Owlette to accept his apology, but Owlette remains adamant that scaring her at the museum was mean, and not funny. Owlette proceeds to be hard on Catboy, but she only makes the mission harder.
4a	4a	"Catboy and the Shrinker"	Christian De Vita	Simon Nicholson; Head writer : Marc Seal	Edouard Charles	2 October 2015	1.52
By day, Connor, Greg, and Amaya were heading to the playground. Connor says he's finally tall enough to go on the big kids' stuff when Greg notices that the playground has been shrunk. The PJ Masks soon find out that Romeo and Night Ninja teamed up to shrink them. Catboy says that he's a big kid. But when Romeo and Night Ninja shorten him, Catboy makes the mission harder by complaining that he's so small and has to learn to use it to his advantage.
4b	4b	"Owlette and the Moon-Ball"	Christian De Vita	Gerard Foster; Head writer : Marc Seal	Thomas Buron	2 October 2015	1.52
By day, Connor, Greg, and Amaya play soccer against Cameron's team, Cameron says that Amaya is no good at soccer. Meanwhile, Amaya tries to score a goal; Connor and Greg become annoyed at her for not giving the ball to them and for showing off about how good she is at soccer. Amaya gets the soccer ball back when Luna Girl's "Moon-Ball" sucked up the soccer ball. The PJ Masks soon find out that Luna Girl's Moon-Ball sucked up all the playthings so she can deposit them to herself. Owlette makes the mission harder by showing off how good she is at soccer, and by getting sucked up in the Moon-Ball, then Catboy and Gekko had a plan to pop the Moon-Ball with the flagpole at the museum and free Owlette and all of the objects Luna Girl stole.
5a	5a	"Catboy and the Butterfly Brigade"	Christian De Vita	Tom Stevenson; Head writer : Marc Seal	Thomas Buron	9 October 2015	1.38
"Zoo Day" is today! Connor wants to see the lions and tigers, but Greg and Amaya want to see the butterfly gardens instead. Greg and Amaya think that Connor is acting really rough. Then they see that the zoo visitors are leaving the butterfly gardens because the butterflies are gone. By night, the PJ Masks try to get the butterflies back home to the zoo. Owlette uses gentle wind gusts and Gekko beckons them by changing colors. Catboy scares the butterflies by grabbing them in a net at "Super Cat Speed", which makes his teammates mad. Owlette says he's making them miserable, but then Gekko finds out that Luna Girl is using the stripped butterflies as her new "sidekicks" to substitute her moths.
5b	5b	"Owlette the Winner"	Christian De Vita	Ashley Mendoza; Head writer : Marc Seal	Celine Foriscetti	9 October 2015	1.38
By day, Connor and Amaya were playing basketball against Cameron's two teammates. Greg is the scorekeeper, and Cameron is the referee. Connor tries to score, but the other team blocked the ball to Amaya. Amaya started running with the ball, but then she makes a backward shot from the far side of the court. "Amaya's Team" wins! Cameron noticed that his whistle went missing after Amaya scored. By night, the PJ Masks noticed that Luna Girl took the whistle for her two moth teams to get every toy in the toy shop. But Owlette makes the mission harder by making everything into a competition.
6a	6a	"Speak Up, Gekko!"	Christian De Vita	Ross Hastings; Head writer : Marc Seal	Celine Foriscetti	16 October 2015	1.18
By day, Greg is telling a poem to his class, but he was so shy that he choke up the words. Greg tells Connor and Amaya that reading a poem out loud was not easy and embarrassing, and that he doesn't want to read another poem out loud again. But then, Greg finds a box and it took his voice. Greg then does a "victory dance" because he doesn't have to speak tomorrow's poem out loud. But by night, Romeo plans to steal all of the PJ Masks' voices so he can blame them for his crimes. Catboy and Owlette try to get Gekko to get the voice box, but he was so nervous about doing another poem tomorrow, that he was hesitant about getting his voice back.
6b	6b	"Catboy and Master Fang's Sword"	Christian De Vita	Sylvie Barro and Kathryn Walton Ward; Head writer : Marc Seal	Thomas Buron	16 October 2015	1.18
Connor has a poster of Master Fang above his headboard. He explains that his hero is the greatest kung fu master. Greg and Amaya arrive, and want to watch Master Fang on TV. They remind him that Master Fang never gets angry, but Master Fang announces that his sword was stolen last night. By night, they transform (although the poster is replaced with a shot of Catboy's poster of a Yellow-Clad-Cat-Man), and find Night Ninja with Master Fang's sword. Catboy keeps getting angry so they can get Master Fang's sword back from Night Ninja. But no matter how many times Gekko and Owlette try to tell Catboy to stop getting angry, he just wouldn't listen.
7a	7a	"Catboy vs. Robo-Cat"	Christian De Vita and Wilson Dos Santos	Justine Cheynet; Head writer : Marc Seal	Wilson Dos Santos	23 October 2015	1.35
By day, Connor, Greg, and Amaya were playing frisbee, but Connor's frisbee went into his garden. So once he got it, Greg and Amaya disappeared. By night, Catboy goes out to search for his friends, and thinks that they are being controlled by Romeo. He then discovers they are robot duplicates who Romeo calls "Robo-Owl" and "Robo-Gekko", while the real Greg and Amaya are being locked in hanging cages. They tried to get Catboy to get them out, but he is overprotective and claims that they don't stand a chance without their superpowers. The robots have all the powers of the originals, plus the added ability to fire energy beams out of their eyes. Robo-Gekko manages to steal the Cat Car away from Catboy. Meanwhile, Greg borrows one of Amaya's pink wing hairpins and uses it to remove the screws holding the cage together. Catboy tries to figure out how to get the pajamas back, which are necessary for accessing the PJ Mask powers, and thinks that Amaya and Greg can't help because they don't have their powers. It is unknown why the PJ's are required for the PJ Masks to activate their powers. Romeo does not explain how he got the pajamas, but this indicates that he is aware of their civilian identities and home locations. He mentions he spent years building a supercomputer to power the robots, but it is not clear if he has been battling the PJ Masks for that long or if he began building the computer for a different reason.
7b	7b	"Owlette and the Giving Owl"	Christian De Vita	Ross Hastings; Head writer : Marc Seal	Christian De Vita	23 October 2015	1.35
During school for show-and-tell, Amaya shares the Giving Owl, a sculpture that her aunt gave her. She wants to keep it after Greg tells her she's supposed to give it away. When all the other kids' stuff for show and tell is stolen, the PJ Masks discover that Luna Girl stole the stuff for her new Luna Lair. Luna Girl then breaks into Amaya's house and steals the "moon statue", as the Giving Owl is a statue of a blue owl perched atop a white orb that resembles a moon. Catboy and Gekko try to get Owlette to give the Giving Owl to Luna Girl, but Owlette wanted to keep it because it is special to her and works too hard to get it back.
8a	8a	"Catboy and the Great Birthday Cake Rescue"	Christian De Vita	Gerard Foster; Head writer : Marc Seal	Celine Foriscetti	30 October 2015	1.14
By day, on the night before June 1st Connor, Greg, and Amaya head to the library to celebrate Greg's 6th birthday. But when they arrive, all of the party supplies including the lizard cake was stolen. By night, it was Night Ninja and his Ninjalinos who has the party supplies to plan his birthday party. The PJ Masks try to get the lizard cake back, but the only thing that gets in the way of completing their mission was Catboy's love for the cake and decorations which are based on Master Fang, and his persuasion of Gekko to use them at the party instead.
8b	8b	"Gekko and the Snore-A-Saurus"	Christian De Vita	Tom Stevenson; Head writer : Marc Seal	Thomas Buron	30 October 2015	1.14
By day, Connor, Greg, Amaya, and Cameron were preparing for the school puppet show when Cameron smells cookies from the cafeteria. But the teacher announced that the puppets had gone missing. The PJ Masks were surprised when they saw Cameron sleepwalking! Gekko found out that Luna Girl took the puppets, but he got distracted by the moths' puppet moves.
9a	9a	"Looking After Gekko"	Christian De Vita	Christian De Vita; Head writer : Marc Seal	Thomas Buron	6 November 2015	1.20
By day, Greg told Connor and Amaya that they always look after him because he's the youngest, but he says that he can do things by himself. But when they're about to go home, the school bus is missing. By night, it is revealed that Night Ninja and his Ninjalinos have stolen the school bus and want to convert it into his Super-Vehicle. The team tries to get it back, but a stubborn Gekko insists on completing the mission by himself, only making Catboy and Owlette annoyed with him.
9b	9b	"Catboy and the Teeny Weeny Ninjalino"	Christian De Vita and Wilson Dos Santos	Tom Stevenson; Head writer : Marc Seal	Edouard Charles	6 November 2015	1.20
By day, Connor wants to be the first one in his classroom when he notices that his desk is a mess. Greg and Amaya want Cameron to help clean up Connor's desk, but Connor doesn't want Cameron's help. When Cameron sadly walks out of the classroom, Amaya gets angry at Connor for not letting Cameron help. Greg then notices tiny Ninjalino footprints on one of Connor's homework sheets. By night, the PJ Masks find the tiny Ninjalino, but Catboy keeps trying to catch it while the tiny Ninjalino messed up all 3 floors of HQ. Then, Catboy forces the tiny Ninjalino to leave, but it won't leave. Soon, the PJ Masks find Night Ninja and the rest of his Ninjalinos. Night Ninja gets very surprised when his "spy" (the tiny Ninjalino) wants to work with the PJ Masks.
10a	10a	"Catboy's Tricky Ticket"	Christian De Vita	Justine Cheynet; Head writer : Marc Seal	Edouard Charles	13 November 2015	0.97
By day, Greg and Amaya wanted to see Jayden Houston perform, but the concert was sold out. Connor ran up to them and told them that he only has one spare ticket, so he'll have to take Greg or Amaya to the concert. They begin to persuade Connor into giving them the spare ticket, but the concert was canceled when Jayden's golden microphone was missing. By night, Luna Girl took the golden microphone to have her concert. Gekko and Owlette tried to get Catboy to give them the spare ticket, but it keeps making the mission harder.
10b	10b	"Gekko and the Missing Gekko-Mobile"	Christian De Vita and Wilson Dos Santos	Tom Stevenson; Head writer : Marc Seal	Thomas Buron	13 November 2015	0.97
By day, Connor, Greg, and Amaya are at school waiting to make a "Record-Breaking" Omelette, but the teacher announces that there are no eggs to make it. By night, the PJ Masks find out that Romeo has "rotten-ated" all the eggs to stop them. Gekko hides his Gekko-Mobile with "Gekko-Mobile Camouflage", but he doesn't know where he left it at. So Gekko lies to Catboy and Owlette that he didn't lose the Gekko-Mobile, fearing that they will make fun of him for it.
11a	11a	"Catboy's Flying Fiasco"	Christian De Vita and Wilson Dos Santos	Ashley Mendoza; Head writer : Marc Seal	Frederic Carvalho	20 November 2015	1.05
By day, Connor was flying his toy helicopter, when Greg tells him about the Hot Air Balloon ride that he and Amaya are going to. Then, Connor trips over a giant present. He finds a new scooter inside the box that was "sent" by his great-aunt, Cynthia. Greg notices that Connor's new scooter looks familiar. Then, Connor, Greg, and Amaya were going to the Hot Air Balloon ride, when they notice that the rope was cut. By night, the PJ Masks find out that Luna Girl took the Hot Air Balloon so she can turn it into her very own "Moony Balloon". Catboy asks Luna Girl for the Hot Air Balloon back, but then Luna Girl controls Catboy's scooter with her Luna Magnet. Gekko finally notices what Catboy's scooter really is: A Disguised Luna Board! The Moon-Y Balloon finally flies away when Catboy accidentally cuts the rope with the Luna Board. Gekko catches up with the Moon-Y Balloon, but then he has his flying problem.
11b	11b	"Gekko's Stay-at-Home Sneezes"	Christian De Vita and Wilson Dos Santos	Tom Stevenson; Head writer : Marc Seal	Dorothee Robert	20 November 2015	1.05
By day on June 1st 2017 , Connor, Greg, and Amaya start to get the first issue of the Flossy Flash comic. On Greg's tablet on June 1st 2017 which is the day of his 7th Birthday on Amaya and Connor notice that Greg has some serious Sneezes and coughing, and has a high fever of 38.5 degrees Celsius but they insist and tell him to stay inside until he gets better. Then, they found out that the comic was stolen. But Greg wants to help, and states that a sneeze and fever won't stop me At night, Catboy says that now that he's Gekko, he got "super sneezes and his fever has worsen". Gekko always goes out of HQ to warn Catboy and Owlette about Luna Girl ignoring his super sneezes, but Catboy and Owlette are telling him to stay inside. Luna Girl states that she will take over PJ Masks HQ with Gekko out to warn Catboy and Owlette.
12a	12a	"Gekko Saves Christmas"	Christian De Vita	Justine Cheynet; Head writer : Marc Seal	Alexandre Hesse	4 December 2015	1.17
By day, Connor and Amaya were ice skating enjoying the fun, but Greg complains that he doesn't know how to skate, and that he'll never get it. They noticed that all the lights and decorations on the Christmas Tree were gone on Christmas Eve morning. By night, Luna Girl was stealing the presents, so that there would be no Christmas. Gekko must learn how to ride Luna Girl's Luna Board, and save Christmas.
12b	12b	"Gekko's Nice Ice Plan"	Christian De Vita	Lisa Akhurst; Head writer : Marc Seal	Céline Foriscetti	4 December 2015	1.17
By day, Connor woke up with a glass of ice in his hand, not knowing how it has frozen. When Amaya steps out of her house, she notices icicles on her roof. Once Connor, Amaya and Greg come outside, they notice that the whole town has been frozen. By night, it was Romeo who turns the streets of the city into an icy-roller coaster for his newest invention: the "Lab-oggan". Gekko learns that he can grip to the ice to prevent, but when he tries to tell Catboy and Owlette what his plan is, they repeatedly ignore him.
13a	13a	"Gekko and the Mighty Moon Problem"	Christian De Vita	Ashley Mendoza; Head writer : Marc Seal; Executive story editor : Craig Martin	Dominique Etchecopar	11 December 2015	1.23
By day, Greg was having trouble building his Solar System model for his class. Amaya tells Greg to take his project "one step at a time", but then Connor finds out that the school field trip to the observatory was cancelled because a giant telescope was stolen. By night, the PJ Masks find out that Romeo stole the telescope to amplify a laser in order to carve a portrait of him onto the moon. However, one of Luna Girl's moths found out about Romeo's plan. Romeo then drives to a different part of the town to fire his Space Laser, but then Gekko finds a furious Luna Girl telling him that she won't let Romeo shoot the moon. Gekko has 5 problems to deal with: Romeo, Robot, the Space Laser, Luna Girl and Luna Girl's moths. But then Gekko has a plan: he calls for Luna Girl to stop Romeo from shooting the moon.
13b	13b	"Clumsy Catboy"	Christian De Vita	Lienne Sawatsky and Dan Williams; Head writer : Marc Seal	Alexandre Hesse	11 December 2015	1.23
By day, Greg and Amaya get ready to show their volcano project, but they notice that Connor has become clumsy and nearly wrecked their project. They notice that Connor wasn't that only one that's clumsy. By night, it was Romeo that was making everyone in the city clumsy with a ray. Gekko and Owlette tried to get Catboy to admit that he's clumsy but he won't. Gekko and Owlette got surprised that Romeo said Catboy was the first one to be zapped on the night before. Now, Gekko and Owlette got zapped with Romeo's machine, and both are very clumsy. To stop Romeo's plan, the PJ Masks decide to use their clumsiness rather than trying to prevent it.
14a	14a	"Catboy and Gekko's Robot Rampage"	Christian De Vita and Wilson Dos Santos	Craig Martin; Head writer : Marc Seal; Executive story editor : Craig Martin	Alexandre Hesse	22 January 2016	1.30
By day, Connor and Greg were talking about playing Master Fang and Kick McGee. Amaya wants to play Flossy Flash, but Connor says that she's from a different show. Greg says that Amaya can play Sloppy the K9 Sidekick Dog, but Amaya doesn't want to. But then, Connor notices that the playground equipment was stolen. By night, the PJ Masks find out that Robot took all the equipment because Romeo made a new robot called "Robette". Robot says that he is making a "new best friend" out of the playground equipment because he is jealous. Owlette feels left out whenever Catboy and Gekko play as Master Fang and Kick McGee, as she still wants to play as Flossy Flash. One time, when Robette introduced herself, Owlette crashed into her, and she turned into an evil cyborg. Robette kept saying "take over the World!" while carrying Romeo. Robot sees this and decides to save Romeo.
14b	14b	"Owlette's Feathered Friend"	Christian De Vita	Lisa Akhurst; Head writer : Marc Seal	Bernard Portier	22 January 2016	1.30
By day, Connor, Greg, and Amaya were at Greg's house taking care of Greg's pet lizard, Lionel. Amaya wishes that she got a pet, and states that pets are fun as she plays with Lionel. Then their bracelet-rings are telling them that someone is invading HQ. They found out that there's no invader, and it's just a bird. The bird seems to like Owlette as she nuzzles her. Owlette asked if this bird can be her pet, and names her "Birdie". Gekko states that looking after a pet can be a lot of work, but Owlette said that taking care of a pet is easy. Then they saw Luna Girl at the museum taking something. Luna Girl then reveals that she is going to turn HQ into a giant Luna Magnet, and her Luna Crystals are inside being put by Birdie due to Owlette being a terrible pet owner.
15a	15a	"Owlette and the Battling Headquarters"	Christian De Vita	Dave Dias; Head writer : Marc Seal; Executive story editor : Craig Martin	Emmanuel Perez	29 January 2016	1.30
By night, Connor, Greg, and Amaya were talking through walkie-talkies, but then they see Ninjalinos stealing school buses. The PJ Masks find out that Night Ninja has made his HQ out of the stolen school buses. When Night Ninja shows the PJ Masks what his HQ can do, Owlette wishes for all the stuff that Night Ninja has on his HQ on their HQ.
15b	15b	"Gekko and the Mayhem at the Museum"	Christian De Vita and Wilson Dos Santos	Agnès Slimovici and Isabelle Bottier; Head writer : Marc Seal; Executive story editor : Craig Martin	Frédéric Carvalho	29 January 2016	1.30
By day, Greg wants to build a very awesome model rocket ship, but all the supplies to build one is gone. Connor cheers Greg up about the trip to the science museum, but the teacher said that the trip was cancelled because there was no electricity. By night, it is revealed that Romeo wants to take over the town with his latest invention, The Big Box of Bad. Robot says that Romeo is going to rename the town "Romeoville" or "Romeopolis" once the box is complete. Gekko gets mad, but then he finds out that Romeo booby-trapped all the tiles of the museum floor. Gekko's first trick is for Romeo to buy some ice cream, but then Gekko steps on another booby-trapped tile that spits out a gigantic boulder. Gekko gets steamed when the boulder crashes into his Gekko-Mobile, but then Catboy thinks of something: Stinky Cheese. When Romeo finds out about the Stinky Cheese, he stinks up the PJ Masks with "super, super stink". But then, Romeo's Big Box of Bad is finally complete, and "Romeopolis" is created.
16a	16a	"Catboy Takes Control"	Christian De Vita and Wilson Dos Santos	Story by : Patrick Granleese; Teleplay by : Lisa Akhurst; Head writer : Marc Seal	Bernard Portier	5 February 2016	1.21
By day, Connor, Greg, and Amaya were finished building their new remote control helicopter. But when Connor tried to fly it, he noticed that all the inside parts were stolen. By night, the PJ Masks find out that Romeo has taken the parts for his new remote that controls people to do whatever Romeo wants. Then, Romeo zaps Owlette because he wants Owlette to steal more remote controls. Gekko has a plan, but Catboy says that he's "in control", so he came up with a plan that Gekko can't do very well: jumping. Later, Romeo finishes a bigger remote that can control 3 people at once: The Radical Romeo Remote. Catboy understands that being controlled is a bad thing.
16b	16b	"Owlette's Two Wrongs"	Christian De Vita	Justine Cheynet; Head writer : Marc Seal	Thomas Buron	5 February 2016	1.21
By day, Connor, Greg, and Amaya were at the school showing their art projects. When they saw that Amaya's Flossy Flash sculpture is broken, that made Amaya really sad, but she will get revenge. By night, Night Ninja and his Ninjalinos are at the museum with the stolen art, and a giant statue of Night Ninja. The PJ Masks work to stop Night Ninja from destroying the museum when Owlette accidentally broke the hand of Night Ninja's statue while trying to dodge the Sticky Splats, making Night Ninja so mad at her. Now Owlette knows that revenge doesn't solve anything. The next day, Amaya uses some of Night Ninja's Sticky Splats to fix her Flossy Flash sculpture.
17a	17a	"Gekko Floats"	Christian De Vita	Story by : Jonah Stroh; Teleplay by : Stephen Senders; Head writer : Marc Seal	Dean Roberts	12 February 2016	1.53
By day, Connor, Greg, and Amaya were playing tag. When Greg started to hit HQ, it started to float. By night, Romeo was using his Anti-Gravity Machine to stop the PJ Masks, and to tries to send HQ to the moon. When Catboy and Owlette are hit by the Anti-Gravity machine, Gekko comes up with a plan to stop Romeo.
17b	17b	"Catboy's Two-Wheeled Wonder"	Christian De Vita	Lisa Akhurst; Head writer : Marc Seal	Céline Foriscetti	12 February 2016	1.53
By day, Connor, Greg, and Amaya were riding their bikes to the park when they noticed a stack of crushed cars. The PJ Masks soon find out that Romeo stole more cars, and their Super-Vehicles! But the PJ Masks won't give up. Romeo decides to fly the Owl Glider first, and Owlette comes up with a plan to stop him. But as soon as Gekko is ready, Catboy leaves to get his Cat Car back. As soon as Owlette and Gekko find Catboy, Romeo decides to drive the Gekko-Mobile. Gekko is angered, but Owlette comes up with another plan to stop Romeo. The PJ Masks are ready for their plan to work. But as soon as Owlette starts her part of the plan, Catboy leaves again to have another shot at getting his Cat Car back. Owlette got mad at Catboy for not helping her with the plan to stop Romeo. Catboy then sees Romeo drive his Cat Car, but he decides to stop Romeo on his own. Owlette and Gekko are amazed, but then Romeo says he's gonna crush all of the PJ Masks' Super-Vehicles!
18a	18a	"Catboy's Great Gig"	Christian De Vita and Wilson Dos Santos	Lisa Akhurst; Head writer : Marc Seal	Emmanuel Perez	18 March 2016	1.05
By day, Connor, Greg, and Amaya are preparing for a school concert, but Connor says he has stage fright. Greg and Amaya were going to get the instruments with the other kids, but they were stolen. The PJ Masks soon find out that Night Ninja took the instruments for his concert. But Catboy accidentally messes up each plan because Owlette reminds him of their concert, forgetting of his nervousness. Catboy makes the mission more difficult with his stage fright.
18b	18b	"Owlette's New Move"	Christian De Vita	Andrew Healey; Head writer : Marc Seal; Script editor : Simon Nicholson	Dean Roberts	18 March 2016	1.05
By day, Connor and Greg were making up a new Three-Way superhero move, but Amaya keeps messing it up during practice because she doesn't understand what her new move is. The PJ Masks find out that Romeo took over the world by using three machines instead of just one: his Robot, his Lab-oggan (from "Gekko's Nice Ice Plan"), and his Track-A-Whacker (the stolen train from "Blame It on the Train, Owlette").
19a	19a	"Supersonic Owlette"	Christian De Vita	Sylvie Barro and Kathryn Walton Ward; Head writer : Marc Seal	Dean Roberts	1 April 2016	1.43
By day, Connor and Greg were practicing some soccer tricks, when Amaya showed them her new tablet, and what cool features it could do. By night, the gang was video chatting when they find out someone broke into HQ. The PJ Masks were startled when they find Romeo in HQ. Romeo says he needs to know how to bring up the PJ Picture Player in "peace and quiet", so he teleported the PJ Masks outside of HQ. Later that night, Owlette messed everything up, and helped Romeo make HQ fly like a rocket. However, Catboy and Gekko know what HQ's "rocket function" is for, "ultimate disasters, and total emergencies only!"
19b	19b	"Catboy and the Sticky Splat Slingshot"	Christian De Vita	Ashley Mendoza; Head writer : Marc Seal; Script editor : Simon Nicholson	Miguel Gaban	1 April 2016	1.43
By day, Connor, Greg, and Amaya were looking at movie posters of a mysterious person, but they quickly realize it was Night Ninja. The PJ Masks find out that Night Ninja is doing his "baddest bad-guy move ever": the Sticky Splat Slingshot. However, Catboy wants the mission to be his biggest save yet. So, he helps Night Ninja prepare his bad guy move by trying to do the super save, but the PJ Masks end up on the slingshot. They quickly devise a plan to stop Night Ninja for a long time.
20a	20a	"Owlette of a Kind"	Christian De Vita	Amy Benham; Head writer : Marc Seal; Executive story editor : Craig Martin	Olivier Ducrest	22 April 2016	1.34
By day, Connor, Greg, and Amaya were practicing gymnastics at the school playground. Connor decides to do a forwards roll, but that makes Amaya mad because she says it's "her thing". Then, the teacher announces that the gym mats were missing, which is strange to him. By night, the PJ Masks find out that Romeo stole the gym mats because of his latest invention: the Power Copier. Romeo copies Owlette's powers, but Catboy and Gekko get in the middle of a big boom, and now THEY have Owlette's powers too! Every time Catboy and Gekko try to fly, Owlette gets mad at them for using "her powers". Romeo ends up getting the boys' powers too, and that's when Owlette realizes it's time to share her powers with her friends for the good.
20b	20b	"Beat the Drum, Catboy"	Christian De Vita	Tom Stevenson; Head writer : Marc Seal	Christian De Vita	22 April 2016	1.34
By day, Greg and Amaya notice that Connor is going to lead a big parade. Connor tells Greg and Amaya that he cannot lead the parade without his drum. But when some kids notice that part of a float has been painted purple, Connor realizes that his drum was stolen by a Ninjalino. By night, the PJ Masks soon find out that Night Ninja is taking over the parade, and he's renaming it the "Night Ninja Parade Spectacular". Catboy is worried about his drum so much that he has forgotten about Owlette and Gekko.
21a	21a	"Catboy Squared"	Christian De Vita	Justine Cheynet; Head writer : Marc Seal; Script editor : Simon Nicholson	Christian De Vita	24 June 2016	0.73
By the first night, the PJ Masks stop Romeo from using his new Multiplier. When the PJ Masks "all shout hooray", Romeo has decided to come back the next night. The next day, Connor wanted to play soccer, but Greg and Amaya don't agree. Then, Greg notices multiple soccer balls in the goal net. By the second night, the PJ Masks find out that Romeo was using his multiplier again (which meant Romeo had multiplied his multiplier). THIS time, Catboy multiplies himself to create a plan to stop Romeo. But instead of following the plans, the other Catboys have fun, and build a fort to stop Romeo. Now, the real Catboy knows that using his ideas was getting into more trouble. He starts to come up with a plan with his friends, involving the three other clones of him.
21b	21b	"Gekko's Super Gekko Sense"	Christian De Vita	Justine Cheynet; Head writer : Marc Seal	Christophe Ollivier Noborio	24 June 2016	0.73
By day, Connor, Greg, and Amaya were at the park, but Greg says he's not good at Capture The Flag. When they get to HQ, Amaya notices that there's a Night Ninja Flag on top of it. By night, the PJ Masks find out that Night Ninja has challenged them to a game of Capture the Flag. Then, Gekko makes up a new power called "Super Gekko Sense". But every time Gekko uses his "Super Gekko Sense", it fails. He learns to appreciate his powers and himself, and the trio beats Night Ninja at Capture the Flag.
22a	22a	"Owlette and the Owletteenies"	Christian De Vita and Wilson Dos Santos	Rachel Murrell; Head writer : Marc Seal	Emmanuel Perez	15 July 2016	0.96
By day, Amaya told Connor and Greg that their teacher had made her a leader for their group. Meanwhile, their field trip was canceled because someone has stolen the chariot. By night, the PJ Masks find out that Night Ninja was the one who had stolen the chariot. The Ninjalinos were tired of Night Ninja for always being mean to them and Owlette said that he was not a very good leader and she described what type of leader she would be like. Then, the Ninjalinos had decided that they wanted Owlette to be their leader (which meant they had betrayed Night Ninja), and Night Ninja went away. Owlette called the Ninjalinos, the "Owletteenies". But Owlette kept on making the mission harder by trying to get the Owletteenies (former Ninjalinos) to do what she wanted.
22b	22b	"Gekko's Blame Campaign"	Christian De Vita	Tom Stevenson; Head writer : Marc Seal	Bernard Portier	15 July 2016	0.96
By day, Connor and Amaya were at the Cafe when Greg showed up, telling Connor and Amaya about the car Cameron let him borrow for the day. But by the time they arrive at Greg's house, Cameron's car was not there because Greg had left it in front of his house all night. When Cameron overheard this, he blames Greg for losing his car which he didn't lose it. Greg said that it wasn't his fault, but Cameron doesn't believe him. By night, the PJ Masks find out that Luna Girl was the one who had stole Cameron's car and presumably framed him last night for losing it, so Gekko kept on blaming Luna Girl for the stuff that she did, when he (Gekko) did it himself.
23a	23a	"Owlette and the Moonflower"	Christian De Vita and Wilson Dos Santos	Gerard Foster; Head writer : Marc Seal; Script editor : Simon Nicholson	Florent Lagrange	19 August 2016	1.61
By day, the trio are working on sunflowers for the sunflower competition. Connor and Greg notice that Amaya's flower isn't so healthy, and they give her advice. But Amaya says she is a gardening natural, and she does not need help. When she goes to get gardening equipment, she sees that it's gone, and then Connor notices moths. By night, the PJ Masks see Luna Girl with a giant moonflower, or moon weed. Catboy and Gekko tell Owlette that the weed might not like what flowers like, but she ignores them and keeps trying to use gardening stuff. She ends up getting in bad situations and accidentally releases the moonflower's seeds, until she realizes what she's doing wrong. Owlette decides it's time to stop the weeds and be a hero.
23b	23b	"Slowpoke Gekko"	Christian De Vita and Wilson Dos Santos	Andrew Healey; Head writer : Marc Seal; Executive story editor : Craig Martin	Thomas Buron	19 August 2016	1.61
In the day, the trio discovers slow moving people and animals. As the PJ Masks, they discover that Romeo invented a slow motion ray so everyone will be too slow to stop him from conquering the world. But Gekko keeps getting distracted, causing him to be hit by the slow motion ray. He comes up with a plan for Catboy and Owlette to distract Romeo, while he slowly makes his way to destroy the slow motion machine.
24a	24a	"Catboy and the Lunar Dome"	Christian De Vita and Wilson Dos Santos	Justine Cheynet; Head writer : Marc Seal; Script editor : Simon Nicholson	David Lopez, Lila Peuscet	21 October 2016	0.98
At day, Connor is trying a new dance move called The Spinning Tornado except he messed up and ended up being laughed by the kids. Then, while Connor, Amaya, and Greg are walking back to their school, one of Luna Girl's moths gave the kids an invitation to her party, but they soon become suspicious of her plan and the trio transforms later at night. Luna Girl appears with the speakers and streamers for the party. She states that the PJ masks aren't really guests, but are victims of her Lunar Dome, and traps them. Luckily, the dome doesn't cover the whole HQ since it is only in a half circle so the PJ masks suggest that Catboy doing The Spinning Tornado at Super Cat Speed to tunnel underground is the only way out. But an embarrassed Catboy thinks of other ideas despite Owlette and Gekko telling him that the Spinning Tornado is the only key to escaping the dome.
24b	24b	"Gekko and the Rock of All Power"	Christian De Vita and Wilson Dos Santos	Ashley Mendoza; Head writer : Marc Seal; Script editor : Simon Nicholson	Emmanuel Perez	21 October 2016	0.98
When Greg, Connor, and Amaya were in the library reading books, Greg found a book about the strongest athletes in the world that won many medals and trophies. Greg wondered if he could win at least one medal to declare him being strong. By the time they went out of the library, they saw lamposts being bent. By night, they saw Night Ninja chasing a rock called the Rock of All Power. Amaya heard about the rock in her Kung Fu book that whoever breaks the rock will be awarded a medal. Gekko was so tempted to break the rock to get the medal since he has the power of strength instead of protecting his friends and their HQ. But while he tries to stop the rock, he breaks it, not meaning to. He says that he felt stronger than ever, and that true strength comes from caring for his friends.
25a	25a	"Super-Sized Gekko"	Christian De Vita and Wilson Dos Santos	Jonah Stroh; Head writer : Marc Seal	Frédéric Carvalho	2 December 2016	0.95
In the daytime, Greg has a messy room. He picks up his walkie-talkie to talk to his friends. Connor says that he and Amaya are going to HQ, to see if any villains are planning something. But Greg wants to go with them instead of cleaning his room. By night, the trio lands in Gekko's room, which is also messy. Owlette gets concerned that Gekko didn't put a couple of Romeo's machines away, and tells him to clean while she and Catboy are looking for villains. Gekko uses the small-sizer to shrink the mess, but he accidentally uses a super-size option on himself after stepping on a cactus that he had shrunken. His friends are frightened at what he had become, but he wants to use his size to stop a villain. They discover that Luna Girl stole all the parade floats. Gekko lets the super-size machine go to his head, and accidentally hits a moth with it. Luna Girl finds this handy, as she takes the machine from Gekko and uses it on a few of her moths. He is shrunk back to his original size, and he finally comes up with a plan, involving a giant bird, to stop Luna Girl.
25b	25b	"Take to the Skies, Owlette"	Christian De Vita	Story by : Jonah Stroh; Teleplay by : Lisa Akhurst; Head writer : Marc Seal	Stéphanie Russo	2 December 2016	0.95
The three friends are excited about the loop-the-loop airplane show, but two adults tell them it's been canceled because the planes were stolen. Amaya is confident that she'd stop the villain with her amazing flying skills. In the night, Night Ninja is flying around with the planes. Owlette tries to stop the planes with the Owl Glider, but Night Ninja makes her crash and breaks the Owl Glider. Catboy and Gekko try to convince their friend to go after him without her vehicle, but she doesn't have enough confidence because she thought she wasn't as good a flier as Night Ninja, due to her crash. When Catboy and Gekko borrow that plane from the museum, Owlette struggles to share a plan with Catboy and Gekko because she thought Night Ninja would beat them again, but her friends finally encourage her with support and they get the planes from Night Ninja.
26a	26a	"Slow Down, Catboy!"	Christian De Vita	Sylvie Barro and Kathryn Walton Ward; Head writer : Marc Seal	Olivier Thulliez "Güss"	17 February 2017	0.91
Connor, Greg, and Amaya are preparing for a school race, but the trophy was stolen. In the night, they find out Night Ninja took the trophy. He proposes a race between himself and Catboy, with Luna Girl as the referee. What she really wants is a trophy for herself. Catboy keeps messing up because he kept going too fast in each competition. Owlette and Gekko try to convince him to take his time, as slow and steady wins the race. Finally, he comes up with a plan and offers one last race with the two villains. This time, he slows down and wins the race, with the other two competetants losing. The PJ Masks return the trophy to where it belonged.
26b	26b	"Gekko's Special Rock"	Christian De Vita and Wilson Dos Santos	Justine Cheynet; Head writer : Marc Seal	Christophe Olliver Noborio	17 February 2017	0.91
Greg accidentally leaves his rock at the museum. He and his friends go back to get it, only to discover all the magnetic rocks are gone. By night, they find that Luna Girl stole the rocks for her Luna magnet to pick up bigger things, like vehicles. She uses them to try and destroy things, including the PJ Masks. But instead of trying to get the mission done, Gekko tries to go after his rock, and that causes the heroes to struggle to get the mission to success. His friends tell him that it's not important like the mission is, and he sacrifices his rock to stop Luna Girl.

=== Shorts (2017–20) ===
No.	Title	Original release date
1	"Super Cat Speed"	31 July 2017
2	"Super Gekko Muscles"	1 August 2017
3	"Owl Eyes"	2 August 2017
4	"Reinvention"	3 August 2017
5	"Moth's Day"	4 August 2017
6	"Super Moves Dance Party"	5 August 2017
7	"Super Gekko Camouflage"	11 August 2017
8	"Teamwork"	18 August 2017
9	"All Skills"	25 August 2017
10	"Determination"	1 September 2017
11	"Gekko Improvises"	8 September 2017
12	"Super Singing Heroes"	15 September 2017
13	"Team Night Ninja"	22 September 2017
14	"Super Cat Ears"	29 September 2017
15	"Owlette Improvises"	13 October 2017
16	"A Job for All"	27 November 2017
17	"Bravery"	28 November 2017
18	"Catboy Improvises"	29 November 2017
19	"Taking Turns"	30 November 2017
20	"Training with the PJ Masks"	1 December 2017
21	"It's a PJ Masks Christmas"	14 December 2018
22	"Moon Rocked"	23 December 2018
23	"Play Date on the Moon"	24 December 2018
24	"Space Race"	25 December 2018
25	"Cat Car Chaos"	26 December 2018
26	"Gekko Mobile Mischief"	27 December 2018
27	"Robots Wash Up"	4 January 2019
28	"Owl Glider Gliding"	25 January 2019
29	"Armadylan Style"	8 March 2019
30	"Wolfy Garden"	22 March 2019
31	"Bye Bye Bad Luna"	22 April 2019
32	"Catboy Power Up"	23 April 2019
33	"Owlette Power Up"	24 April 2019
34	"Gekko Power Up"	25 April 2019
35	"Masters of the Mountain"	26 April 2019
36	"Moon Cuddly"	27 April 2019
37	"PJ Rovers"	16 July 2019
38	"PJ Racing"	17 July 2019
39	"An Yu's Bird Rescue"	18 July 2019
40	"PJ Masks Surprise"	19 July 2019
41	"Ninjability"	2 August 2019
42	"HQ Tour"	14 August 2019
43	"Minding Motsuki"	31 August 2019
44	"Learning the Planets"	28 January 2020
45	"Attrape le microbe" (Note: This short was released exclusively on the France TV website. It was only released in French.)	3 September 2020

=== Season 2 (2018–19) ===
No. overall	No. in season	Title	Directed by	Written by	Storyboard by	Original release date	U.S. viewers (millions)
27a	1a	"Moonfizzle Balls"	Christian De Vita	Lisa Akhurst; Head writer : Brad Birch	David Vinicombe	15 January 2018	1.13
At day time, the kids were playing until they notice some new purple balls, however, when Cameron and the other kids touched them, they act strange and kept on saying "Moon". In the evening, Luna Girl was the one who created the Moonfizzle Balls and plans to take over the Earth together with the Moon-fizzled people. However, when Catboy fools around too fast with the Moonfizzle balls with the tennis rackets instead of collecting them, the balls hit Owlette and Gekko who also become moon-fizzled and Catboy must fix this himself.
27b	1b	"Soccer Ninjalinos"	Christian De Vita	Tim Bain; Head writer : Simon Nicholson	Christian Kuntz	15 January 2018	1.13
At day time, the kids are practicing their soccer skills until they noticed a toy store nearby has sticky splats all over it. At night, Night Ninja and his Ninjalinos are playing their style of soccer and plan to splat the entire city. When Owlette's feet are stuck in a splat ball, she still wants to play despite her disabled feet but that only makes the mission harder.
28a	2a	"Lionel-Saurus"	Christian De Vita	Jonah Stroh; Head writer : Simon Nicholson	Jean-François Galataud	19 January 2018	0.77
The kids are having a picnic in the park while Greg is playing with his pet Lionel until they noticed that Lionel has mysteriously disappeared. At night, it turns out Romeo was feeding Lionel some green pet treats that make him big and calls him Lionel-Saurus though he also has some red treats that make him shrink. He also suggests that making the treats took 365 bedtimes which is strange. Regrettably, Gekko keeps on being watchful on his favorite pet notwithstanding Lionel's big size which not only makes the mission harder but nearly jeopardized both the PJ Masks and the city.
28b	2b	"Catboy's Cuddly"	Christian De Vita	Gerard Foster; Head writer : Brad Birch	Eric Dragon	19 January 2018	0.77
At day time, the kids are going to school with their cuddly pets though Connor knows they're too adored already to have those until they noticed that Cameron's sibling is disconcerted that she has a speaking Romeo doll instead of her cuddly which makes the youngsters questionable. At night, Romeo and Robot were stealing all the cuddly dolls and plan to transform them into cuddly Romeo dolls. But Catboy wasn't the only one who feels humiliated for hiding his cuddly from his teammates, even Owlette and Gekko are also ashamed because their cuddly dolls are taken so they must stop Romeo at all costs notwithstanding existing kids.
29a	3a	"Night of the Cat"	Christian De Vita	Simon Nicholson; Head writer : Simon Nicholson	Pierre Violot	26 January 2018	0.53
The kids are in the museum looking at all the tabby advertisements and the teacher explains the legend about the Night of the Cat which inspires the kids (mostly Connor). At night, the PJ masks become curious about the cat-ability until Luna Girl shows up with her moon energy ball. While they're distracting Luna Girl by pretending to have fun, Catboy tries to unlock the cat-ability but his curiosity makes him forget about his teammates. It turns out to be a trick by Luna Girl because the writing was hers, the cat-ability is artificial and the 3 cat sculptures are moon statues who trap Catboy in a moon wheel until Catboy creates a plan to use the moon disk against Luna Girl.
29b	3b	"Catboy Does It Again"	Christian De Vita	Christian De Vita; Head writer : Brad Birch	Christian De Vita and Julien Ferry	26 January 2018	0.53
The kids noticed that everything was turning the opposite route (excluding the PJ Masks). At night, Romeo was the one who was rewinding the world after a glitch on his instrument. But before they could attack Romeo, they didn't think of a plan on how to obstruct him, which produces them to mess up. Catboy kept springing inside action rather than anticipating to come up with a plan. It takes about moiety a dozen courses for Catboy to belatedly agree to come up with a plan.
30a	4a	"Terrible Two-Some"	Christian De Vita	Ashley Mendoza; Head writer : Brad Birch	Christian Kuntz	2 February 2018	0.59
At day time, the kids were exercising their scooter moves until they noticed everyone even the teacher behaving like babies. At night, Romeo invented a baby beam and plans to take over the planet with the infant selves. When Catboy and Owlette get zapped, they behave like infants and Gekko is holding a hard time with the tiny two-some.
30b	4b	"Owlette's Luna Trouble"	Christian De Vita	Justine Cheynet; Head writer : Simon Nicholson	Jeremy Klein	2 February 2018	0.59
On the first night after Night Ninja's downfall, Owlette says there's gonna be an eclipse tomorrow which worries Luna Girl because she believes the moon will disappear. The next day, Amaya shows Connor and Greg the telescope and talks about the eclipse of the plants which the Luna moths were worried too about the moon being eclipsed by darkness. On the second night, Luna Girl is losing her lunar power due to the eclipse and Romeo plans to steal Luna Girl's board and her Luna-Magnet to have moon strength for his lab. The PJ Masks and Luna Girl try to stop Romeo, but Owlette and Luna Girl's quarrel only makes the mission harder.
31a	5a	"Ninja Moths"	Christian De Vita	Tom Stevenson; Head writer : Brad Birch	Momo Fang	9 February 2018	0.73
On the first night in the museum, Luna Girl and her moths teamed up with Night Ninja and his Ninjalinos to stop the PJ Masks, but failed and the twosome blamed their sidekicks. The subsequent day, the kids are shocked to see sticky splats all over the school and the school's jack is ripped. On the second night, the PJ Masks re-entered the museum and they saw Luna Girl and Night Ninja stuck on the glass windows and explains that their sidekicks turned against them and the sidekicks teamed up as Ninja Moths. After realizing that Luna Girl and Night Ninja accused each other of their mistakes, the PJ masks come up with a plan to get the sidekicks (Ninjalinos and Luna Girl's moths) reassemble with their masters.
31b	5b	"Who's Got the Owl Power?"	Christian De Vita	Ashley Mendoza; Head writer : Simon Nicholson	Jean-François Galataud	9 February 2018	0.73
At day time, the teacher is giving all the kids some clues on a game called Track the Treasure until they noticed a giant cut on the playground. At night, Night Ninja and his Ninjalinos were trying to find the ninja wealth and Owlette, even though Catboy and Gekko told her not to play Night Ninja's game, goes to find the 3 items(a Lotus blossom, an ancient monkey figure, and a dragon egg) unaware that those were the things Night Ninja needed to improve their sticky splat.
32a	6a	"PJ Pinball"	Christian De Vita	Brad Birch; Head writer : Brad Birch	Eric Dragon	23 February 2018	0.72
At day time, the kids were talking about their hero stuff until they noticed the crane's wrecking ball mysteriously disappeared. At night, Romeo was the one who took the wrecking ball and plans to turn the whole city into a monstrous pinball device. Regrettably, the PJ masks are having an obstinate time trying to stop all 3 destroying balls and undervalued Romeo until they created a plan on knocking him at his game.
32b	6b	"Bounce-a-Tron"	Christian De Vita	Ashley Mendoza; Head writer : Simon Nicholson	Jeremy Klein	23 February 2018	0.72
At daytime, the kids were walking around until Connor stepped on a bouncing splat which sends him flying into a bush and laughed at by Cameron much to his consternation. At night, the PJ masks were following a trail of splats and they spotted Romeo and Robot, who are unhappy because they lost their bounce-a-lot machine. It directs out Night Ninja was the one who took Romeo's machine and uses it to transform their sticky splat into a bouncy splat. The PJ Masks try to stop the scoundrels but Catboy keeps on showing off which makes the mission harder.
33a	7a	"Wacky Floats"	Christian De Vita	Christian De Vita; Head writer : Simon Nicholson	Emmanuel Perez	9 March 2018	0.77
At daytime, everyone is preparing for the carnival parade until they're shocked that the Candy Train has disappeared. At night, Night Ninja and his Ninjalinos were the ones who took the Candy Train and plan to take all the floats. But Night Ninja isn't the only villain they have to deal with, Romeo was the one who instructed Night Ninja to steal the floats and plans to convert them into evil cars. The PJ Masks try to stop them but they're having a hard time because Gekko keeps on being dependent on his favorite float, The Laughing Lizard.
33b	7b	"Romeo's Disguise"	Christian De Vita	Tom Stevenson; Head writer : Simon Nicholson	Pierre Violot	9 March 2018	0.77
While Gekko and Catboy are cleaning the HQ, Owlette gets lured outside by a Flossy Flash comic, only to be captured by Romeo, who uses a machine to disguise himself as Owlette and unblushingly tries to trick Catboy and Gekko into capturing Luna Girl, her Moths, Night Ninja and his Ninjalinos.
34a	8a	"PJ Robot"	Christian De Vita	Simon Nicholson; Head writer : Simon Nicholson	Momo Fang	6 April 2018	0.80
Romeo creates a little robot that he controls with remote control. The PJ Masks meet and befriend the little robot but then they find out that Romeo wants them to take him to their HQ so he can destroy it. The PJ Masks get the remote control away from Romeo and take the little robot back to their HQ just like Romeo planned. The little robot gets to know The PJ Masks and decides to be a hero, Meanwhile, Romeo makes a TREMENDOUS remote control that he claims can control the little robot. Owlette and Catboy eavesdrop this and decide to face Romeo head-on. They get Gekko and the little robot, who Gekko has dubbed PJ robot and the remote that they took from Romeo. When they find Romeo they find out that the remote that they saw Romeo building is a trap. They end up trapping themselves. Romeo grabs the PJ robot. But PJ Robot doesn't want to just be someone's hand puppet anymore, so it fights against and escapes Romeo's grasp, saves the PJ Masks and in doing so becomes the newest PJ Mask.
34b	8b	"PJ Power Up"	Christian De Vita	Lisa Akhurst; Head writer : Simon Nicholson	Jeremy Klein	6 April 2018	0.80
During the day Connor, Greg, and Amaya were watching PJ Robot in HQ and talking about how great an addition to their team he is, and then they spot a sticky splatted streetlight. That night they go to their HQ where PJ Robot has been hard at work, trying his best to be helpful from creating a means of communication to cleaning up the Cat-Car to trying to make a few modifications to the PJ Picture Player. But none of them are needed by The PJ Masks. They jump into the Owl-Glider and go to stop Night Ninja who is teaching the Ninjalinos how to make stuff levitate with an ancient Ninja art called "Ninja Fingers" and they start battling Night Ninja and the Ninjalinos, which is right about the time PJ Robot starts messing with the PJ Picture Player and finds a huge crystal statue of an Owl, a Cat, and a lizard. While calling Owlette he accidentally uses the statue to blind her, causing the Ninjalinos to take her, Catboy, and Gekko's powers, as they (the PJs) turn back into Amaya, Connor, and Greg, respectively. Without their powers they were no match for Night Ninja and the Ninjalinos, the latter of which has already left after they took their powers, so they ran away from Night Ninja to their HQ but without the crystal, in its place, there is no power whatsoever so they couldn't get into their HQ. They get pretty nasty towards PJ robot once they get to HQ but then they apologize to him shortly after. Then PJ robot used his energy to power the HQ so Connor, Greg, and Amaya can get in. And then they realize that PJ robot gave up most of his energy to let them in. Then they move the statue, which they have some sort of connection to, (they say that their arms start tingling,) to its proper place. Then they become Catboy, Gekko, and Owlette, and jump into the Cat-Car. They go to stop Night Ninja and find that they all have new powers, with Owlette getting Super Owl Feathers, Catboy getting Super Cat Strings, and Gekko getting Super Gekko Shields. They stop Night Ninja with their new powers and save the day.
35a	9a	"Moonstruck: Race to the Moon (Part 1)"	Christian De Vita	Brad Birch; Head writer : Brad Birch	Christian Kuntz	20 April 2018	0.72
During the day, the PJ Masks and their class go to the museum and learn about the harvest moon and figure that since Luna girl likes the moon she is going to plan something bad. That night they jump in the Cat-Car and find out that Luna is going to the moon and decide to go after her. Gekko is scared and tries to say that Luna Girl is bluffing, but Catboy and Owlette aren't willing to take a chance and decide to go to the moon in their HQ Rocket. Gekko reluctantly agrees to go. When they arrive on the moon Gekko offers to stay with PJ robot and help repair the HQ Rocket that got damaged by Luna Girl while going to the moon, but Owlette and Catboy say that they think that they should all go after Luna Girl and Gekko admits that he is scared not just of going to Space, but also of being so far from home. Owlette says that that's ok and that she felt the same way when she had her first sleepover. But Gekko asks if her first sleepover was on the moon. To which Catboy says no and that Gekko can stay and guard the ship while PJ robot fixes it. To which Gekko happily agrees. Catboy and Owlette follow Luna Girl to where a harvest moon crystal is that will boost her power, when they catch up with Luna Girl she has already found the crystal, when they try to stop Luna with their powers they find that they don't work the same on the moon as on earth. Luna grabs the crystal and the crystal turns her Luna Magnet into a Luna Wand and she creates a Luna Fortress and when Catboy and Owlette come in, she traps them in Luna crystals.
35b	9b	"Moonstruck: Lunar Fortress (Part 2)"	Christian De Vita	Brad Birch; Head writer : Brad Birch	Christian Kuntz	20 April 2018	0.72
Luna Girl captured Catboy and Owlette while they were talking to Gekko who stayed behind in the HQ rocket with PJ robot. Gekko can't contact the other PJ masks while they are trapped so after PJ Robot convinces him that it is safe he goes to rescue them. Meanwhile, it has just dawned on Luna that Gekko isn't there and she decides to search for him. Catboy and Owlette try to contact Gekko to warn him, but inside the fortress, no connection can get through. Gekko goes to help them but gets trapped too. Since their powers don't work the same way on the moon as they do on Earth, Catboy uses his Super Cat Speed to break their prisons while Luna goes to Earth to bring everyone to the moon. But unfortunately, her Luna Wand lets her know that the PJ Masks are escaping from the fortress. The PJ masks, to escape from Luna Girl, improvise since their powers don't work the same way there. And manage to get the Luna Wand away from Luna and get the harvest moon crystal out of the Luna Wand and turn it back into a Luna magnet. Then they take the harvest moon crystal back to earth, (where Gekko is ecstatic to be,) and put it in the PJ Vault. When Luna gets back to Earth she resolves to get the harvest moon crystal back, paving the way for a Moonstruck part 3. The PJ Masks and Gekko are glad to be back home after such an exciting mission.
36a	10a	"Robot's Pet Cat"	Christian De Vita	Brad Birch; Head writer : Brad Birch	Diane Fontaine	11 May 2018	0.56
At day time, the kids noticed a blue-collar which makes this curious if it either belongs to a dog or a cat. Then, they found out that the collar had written the word 'Catboy' on it. At night, Catboy hears a cat's meow which turns out to be a recorder and got transformed into a real cat thanks to Romeo's machine and plans to turn everyone into animals for his zoo and take over the world. When Robot realizes that Romeo's plan has gone too far, he turned on his master and tries to crush his machine and protect kitty Catboy from turning back to standard only for him and Romeo to be thwarted thanks to Gekko, Owlette and kitty Catboy.
36b	10b	"Gekko, Master of the Deep"	Christian De Vita	Justine Cheynet; Head writer : Simon Nicholson	Momo Fang	11 May 2018	0.56
Connor was playing with Greg's Toy Submarine until it got pulled underwater. At night, Romeo and Robot were the ones who stole all the mineral objects thanks to Robot's complicated robotic branches and named it Robotopus. Lamentably, Gekko becomes scared to go after Romeo and Robot inside the dark cave which makes the mission harder.
37a	11a	"May the Best Power Win"	Christian De Vita	Ashley Mendoza; Head writer : Simon Nicholson	Eric Dragon	15 June 2018	0.54
The PJ masks test out their new powers at night until they come face to face with Romeo who's been using his spy bot to spy on them earlier at day time and also at night time while they were discussing. After being defeated by their new powers, Romeo creates a power belt for Robot and successfully counters the PJ Masks' attacks and traps them in an unbreakable cage. The PJ Masks soon realized that their bragging is what caused them to be defeated until PJ Robot creates a plan for the team to stop Romeo once again.
37b	11b	"Moonbreaker"	Christian De Vita	Andrew Viner; Head writer : Brad Birch	Emmanuel Perez	15 June 2018	0.54
The kids were watching the moon on the polemoscope until they noticed a strange meteor heading towards the moon which makes the kids suspicious. At night, they were shocked that the moon is cracking and the PJ Masks prepare to go to the moon until Luna Girl shows up and says she can help them since the moon is her home although the PJ Masks doubt her at first, they let her join in. When they arrived at the moon, Romeo and Robot were there finding another lunar crystal unaware that Robot's digging only cracks the moon even more. However, the PJ masks are having difficulties with their mission because they keep on resisting Luna Girl's help even when she implores them to give the Luna Crystal they keep on their PJ vault to her to restore the moon.
38a	12a	"Race Up Mystery Mountain"	Christian De Vita	Tom Stevenson; Head writer : Brad Birch	Octavia Bauer	22 June 2018	0.70
At day time, Connor tells his friends about an ancient scroll of Mystery Mountain and says that on top of the mountain is a gold ring that whoever wears it becomes a powerful user of Ninja Villainy until they were shocked that the scroll is missing. At night, Night Ninja and the ninjalinos were the ones who stole the scroll and goes to the Mystery Mountain to get the ring with the PJ Masks and robot in pursuit.
38b	12b	"The Mountain Prisoner"	Christian De Vita	Lisa Akhurst; Head writer : Simon Nicholson	Emmanuel Perez	22 June 2018	0.70
The kids are in the museum looking for books about mountain legends until they noticed that the bookshelf is ransacked. At night, Night Ninja and the ninjalinos were reading the books they stole and the PJ Masks goes after them. However, while they're away, the Ninjalinos kidnapped PJ Robot and take him back to Mystery Mountain with the PJ Masks in pursuance. When they arrived, Night Ninja tells the PJ Masks to get the ring from the peak Pagoda in exchange for PJ Robot who's being held defendant in their cell which might not be obvious for the heroes due to the Pagoda filled with traps.
39a	13a	"The Wolfy Kids"	Christian De Vita	Simon Nicholson; Head writer : Simon Nicholson	Eric Dragon	6 July 2018	0.58
Catboy has to learn it's not all about him while trying to stop the new villains in town, the Wolfies.
39b	13b	"Wolf-O-Saurus"	Christian De Vita	Tim Bain; Head writer : Simon Nicholson	Christophe Malcombe	6 July 2018	0.58
Gekko's understanding of dinosaurs helps the team get back ancient bones from the Wolfy Kids.
40a	14a	"Catboy No More"	Christian De Vita	Justine Cheynet; Head writer : Brad Birch	Octavia Bauer	27 July 2018	0.63
Robot made a costume for Romeo, who steals Catboy's powers as well. In order to stop him, Catboy will have to learn to be a hero without any super power.
40b	14b	"Gekko vs. the Splatcano"	Christian De Vita	Andrew Viner; Head writer : Simon Nicholson	Christophe Malcombe	27 July 2018	0.63
When Night Ninja makes a volcano out of Sticky Splat, it's up to Gekko to preserve the day.
41a	15a	"Meet Armadylan"	Christian De Vita	Brad Birch; Head writer : Brad Birch	Emmanuel Perez	3 August 2018	0.53
The PJ Masks meet Armadylan and think he is a superhero like them until they find out that he's a villain because of how he intends to save the city and have to work collectively to defeat him before he defeats Night Ninja. In the end, however, he is a friend.
41b	15b	"Invisible Owlette"	Christian De Vita	Andrew Viner; Head writer : Brad Birch	Octavia Bauer	3 August 2018	0.53
Courtesy of Romeo's invisibility ray, Owlette becomes invisible. Gekko and Catboy try to reverse the process, but forget to include her in their plans. She has other ideas.
42a	16a	"Wolfy Mountain"	Christian De Vita	Simon Nicholson; Head writer : Simon Nicholson	Virginie Hanrigou	10 August 2018	0.66
Night Ninja teams up with the PJ Masks when the Wolfies try to take over Mystery Mountain.
42b	16b	"Romeo's Crystal Clear Plan"	Christian De Vita	Danny Stack; Head writer : Brad Birch	Jean-Charles André	10 August 2018	0.66
The Moon Crystal has been stolen from the PJ Masks. They are convinced Luna Girl is the culprit but little did they know that Romeo did it, so he can increase the crystal's powers.
43a	17a	"Nobody's Sidekick"	Christian De Vita	Danny Stack; Head writer : Brad Birch	Christophe Lefebure	17 August 2018	0.57
When the playground is stolen, The PJ Masks find out it was Romeo (who commanded Armadylan to take the playground and to use it as an HQ, At first, Armadylan becomes disturbed at the PJ masks, but when Owlette tries to tell him that Romeo is a bad chap and he is using him, he doesn't listen, until Romeo reveals that he was using him, Realising he was tricked, he becomes too angry and violent, and throws cars at him to get revenge on Romeo (who revealed that he was using Armadylan), as he continues to throw cars at Romeo as revenge, Owlette tries to calm him down by telling him to be a hero until he holds Romeo by his leg, lets him fall but Robot rescues him, Angry at Romeo for not being nice, Romeo apologizes to Robot and begs to be with him. In the day, they go to the Armadylan slide.
43b	17b	"Armadylan Menace"	Christian De Vita	Justine Cheynet; Head writer : Brad Birch	Christian Kuntz	17 August 2018	0.57
Night Ninja made Armadylan believe the PJ Masks stole all the new Flossy Flash comics to distract their attention from him stealing the city's food supplies.
44a	18a	"Power Pondweed"	Christian De Vita	Lisa Akhurst; Head writer : Simon Nicholson	Emmanuel Perez	21 September 2018	0.46
Gekko's powers are increased by the Power Pondweeds Romeo was after in an underwater mission.
44b	18b	"Owlette Comes Clean"	Christian De Vita	Tom Stevenson; Head writer : Brad Birch	Virginie Hanrigou	21 September 2018	0.46
While trying to stop Luna Girl from taking the museum's telescope, Owlette accidentally breaks the lens of the telescope and she becomes scared to tell Catboy and Gekko and lets Luna Girl take the blame. She tries to fess up several times but fails each time. In the day, Amaya becomes guilty but doesn't want to inform Connor and Greg what she did until in the second night. After they catch her in a faceoff with Luna Girl, she finally confesses. She tells Catboy and Gekko that she broke the lens of the telescope and that Luna Girl fixed it. While stopping Luna Girl from stealing all the things from the city by using her Moon Beam connected to the telescope, Luna Girl orders her moths to destroy it. Owlette doesn't want the telescope broken again, so she saves it. After Luna Girl flies away on her Lunaboard, Owlette apologizes for not speaking up when the accident happened. Catboy and Gekko forgive her and pull her into a group hug.
45	19	"Halloween Tricksters"	Christian De Vita	Ashley Mendoza; Head writer : Brad Birch	Emmanuel Perez	5 October 2018	0.62
The PJ Masks must protect the children Luna Girl, Night Ninja, and the Wolfy Kids who have teamed up to steal Halloween goody bags from the trick-or-treaters.
46a	20a	"The Wolfies Take HQ"	Christian De Vita	Ashley Mendoza; Head writer : Simon Nicholson	Jean-Charles André	12 October 2018	0.58
The Wolfies get into the HQ and transform it into their den!
46b	20b	"The Good Wolfy"	Christian De Vita	Justine Cheynet; Head writer : Simon Nicholson	Christopher Malcombe	12 October 2018	0.58
While the Wolfy Kids run amok, Gekko doubts he has what it takes to be good, and Kevin isn't sure he wants to be mean.
47a	21a	"The Wolfy Plan"	Christian De Vita	Tom Stevenson; Head writer : Simon Nicholson	Octavia Bauer	2 November 2018	0.46
Rip tries to gather wings from Owlette's wings to let the Wolfies fly.
47b	21b	"The Lizard Theft"	Christian De Vita	Ciaran Murtagh and Andrew Jones; Head writer : Simon Nicholson	Emmanuel Perez	2 November 2018	0.46
After skeletons are withdrawn from the museum, the PJ Masks think the Wolfies are the criminals!
48a	22a	"PJ Dylan"	Christian De Vita	Ashley Mendoza; Head writer : Brad Birch	Gilduin Couronné	16 November 2018	0.52
After stopping an asteroid from crashing into the city, Armadylan thinks he's one of the PJ Masks.
48b	22b	"Armadylan'd and Dangerous"	Christian De Vita	Justine Cheynet; Head writer : Brad Birch	Thomas Montels	16 November 2018	0.52
Romeo tries to use Armadylan's powers to improve his lab.
49a	23a	"Romeo's Action Toys"	Christian De Vita	Danny Stack; Head writer : Brad Birch	Andry Rakotoariasoa	25 January 2019	0.51
Romeo turns Owlette's Flossy Flash figure into a device that transforms the other PJ Masks into action figure toys!
49b	23b	"The Dragon Gong"	Christian De Vita	Justine Cheynet; Head writer : Brad Birch	Octavia Bauer	25 January 2019	0.51
Night Ninja steals an ancient gong to awaken an authentic Dragon!
50a	24a	"Flight of the Ninja"	Christian De Vita	Simon Nicholson; Head writer : Simon Nicholson	Stéphanie Russo	22 February 2019	0.33
After getting separated, Gekko must learn to face his mistakes to defeat Night Ninja and save the museum from getting sticky splatted.
50b	24b	"Romeocoaster"	Christian De Vita	Lisa Akhurst; Head writer : Simon Nicholson	Thomas Montels	22 February 2019	0.33
Romeo tricks the PJ Masks and the other villains when he stole all the technology and the PJ Masks' powers from the crystal.
51a	25a	"Gekko and the Opposite Ray"	Christian De Vita	Ciaran Murtagh and Andrew Jones; Head writer : Brad Birch	Andry Rakotoariasoa	8 March 2019	0.41
Romeo's newest device turns Owlette and Catboy into villains.
51b	25b	"PJ Masks vs. Bad Guys United"	Christian De Vita	Brad Birch; Head writer : Brad Birch	Christian Kuntz	8 March 2019	0.41
Romeo, Luna Girl, and Night Ninja join forces to defeat the PJ Masks forever. In the end, an unexpected Armadylan saves the PJ Masks.
52a	26a	"Easter Wolfies"	Christian De Vita	Tim Bain; Head writer : Simon Nicholson	Pierre Violot and Julien Ferry	22 March 2019	0.37
The PJ Masks need to protect the chocolate eggs for an Easter hunt from the Wolfies.
52b	26b	"Luna and the Wolfies"	Christian De Vita	Ciaran Murtagh and Andrew Jones; Head writer : Simon Nicholson	Eric Dragon	22 March 2019	0.37
Luna Girl works with the Wolfies to distract the PJ Masks while she steals the museum.

=== Season 3 (2019–20) ===
No. overall	No. in season	Title	Directed by	Written by	Storyboard by	Original release date	U.S. viewers (millions)
53	1	"Moon Madness"	Christian De Vita	Brad Birch; Head writer : Brad Birch	Emmanuel Perez	19 April 2019	0.71
Luna Girl steals the moon crystal to power up her Luna Fortress' Mega-Magnet, which creates a portal that pulls stuff up from the city. The PJ Masks go off to the moon to stop her!
54a	2a	"Armadylan and Robette Rule"	Christian De Vita	Danny Stack; Head writer : Simon Nicholson	Andry Rakotoarisoa	26 April 2019	0.38
Armadylan and potential sidekick Robette fight with Romeo over whose sidekick is better.
54b	2b	"Armadylan Zen"	Christian De Vita	Tony Cooke; Head writer : Simon Nicholson	Octavia Bauer	26 April 2019	0.38
After Armadylan loses his temper again, the PJ Masks take him on a Zen trip.
55a	3a	"Way of the Woofy"	Christian De Vita	Tim Bain; Head writer : Simon Nicholson	Julien Ferry	3 May 2019	0.43
When the Wolfies steal a dog, the PJ Masks must try to get it back.
55b	3b	"Werejalinos"	Christian De Vita	Justine Cheynet; Head writer : Simon Nicholson	Emmanuel Perez	3 May 2019	0.43
The PJ Masks team up with Night Ninja to stop the Wolfies from destroying Mystery Mountain.
56a	4a	"PJ Comet"	Christian De Vita	Lisa Akhurst; Head writer : Simon Nicholson	Florent Callai	10 May 2019	0.41
PJ Robot persuades the PJ Masks to journey towards a comet, because he thinks it'll give HQ extra power.
56b	4b	"Glowy Moths"	Christian De Vita	Sam Dransfield; Head writer : Simon Nicholson	Octavia Bauer	10 May 2019	0.41
Luna teases Romeo with her newly super-charged moths, and the PJ Masks have to stop her.
57a	5a	"Teacher Goes Ninja"	Christian De Vita	Simon Nicholson; Head writer : Simon Nicholson	Thomas Allart	31 May 2019	0.53
Night Ninja kidnaps the PJ Masks' Teacher.
57b	5b	"Robot Goes Wrong"	Christian De Vita	Justine Cheynet; Head writer : Simon Nicholson	Lucie Julliat	31 May 2019	0.53
After Robot gets damaged in battle, the PJ Masks decide to fix him.
58a	6a	"Lionel's Powers"	Christian De Vita	Vanina Marsot; Head writer : Simon Nicholson	Julien Ferry	7 June 2019	0.51
Lionel gets new powers, and Gekko trains him to be his super pet.
58b	6b	"Best Friends Forever"	Christian De Vita	Di Whitley; Head writer : Simon Nicholson	Emmanuel Perez	7 June 2019	0.51
Owlette becomes best friends with Luna Girl and lets her enter HQ.
59	7	"Meet An Yu"	Christian De Vita	Brad Birch; Head writer : Brad Birch	Thomas Allart	21 June 2019	0.44
Night Ninja heads to Mystery Mountain to unleash the mountain's magic, and the heroes team up with Dragon Girl to stop him.
60a	8a	"The Moon Prix"	Christian De Vita	Tim Bain; Head writer : Simon Nicholson	Christian Kuntz	5 July 2019	0.62
Catboy is tempted to cheat when he must race to win back his stolen Cat-Car.
60b	8b	"Pirates Ahoy!"	Christian De Vita	Christian De Vita; Head writer : Simon Nicholson	Emmanuel Perez	5 July 2019	0.62
When Gekko and Owlette's overconfidence plays right into Night Ninja's plan, they must learn to work together.
61a	9a	"The Secret of the Pagoda"	Christian De Vita	Lisa Akhurst; Head writer : Simon Nicholson	Florent Cellai	12 July 2019	0.43
While Catboy is too busy trying to impress An Yu, Night Ninja enters the pagoda.
61b	9b	"Storm of the Ninja"	Christian De Vita	Tony Cooke; Head writer : Simon Nicholson	Octavia Bauer	12 July 2019	0.43
An Yu tries to solve an ancient riddle to become a true Mountain Master.
62a	10a	"Arma-Leader"	Christian De Vita	Justine Cheynet; Head writer : Simon Nicholson	Florent Cellai	19 July 2019	0.44
Armadylan tries to prove he's a great leader by training the Wolfies to become heroes.
62b	10b	"Owlette Slips Up"	Christian De Vita	Clémentine Le Nai; Head writer : Simon Nicholson	Octavia Bauer	19 July 2019	0.44
After stealing Owlette's gadgets, the Wolfies go on a rampage.
63	11	"The Splat Monster"	Christian De Vita	Brad Birch; Head writer : Brad Birch	Julien Ferry	2 August 2019	0.56
Teeny Weeny Ninjalino turns into the Splat Monster and traps the PJ Masks on Mystery Mountain; while they are trapped, Night Ninja uses the Splat Monster to take over the night.
64a	12a	"Moth on the Moon"	Christian De Vita	Simon Nicholson; Head writer : Simon Nicholson	Christian Kuntz	30 August 2019	0.23
A new villain is hatched from a strange crystal on the moon.
64b	12b	"Fly Me To The Moon"	Christian De Vita	Di Whitley; Head writer : Simon Nicholson	Florent Cellai	30 August 2019	0.23
Gekko is forced to confiscate Luna Girl and Motsuki's powers.
65a	13a	"Luna's Cosmic Tantrum"	Christian De Vita	Ashley Mendoza; Head writer : Simon Nicholson	Octavia Bauer	6 September 2019	0.35
Motsuki decides to become Owlette's sidekick after a quarrel with Luna Girl.
65b	13b	"Motsuki the Best"	Christian De Vita	Vanina Marsot; Head writer : Simon Nicholson	Sophie Moulin	6 September 2019	0.35
Motsuki traps Luna Girl and the PJ Masks on the moon.
66a	14a	"Wheels of a Hero"	Christian De Vita	Henry Gifford; Head writer : Simon Nicholson	Julien Ferry	20 September 2019	0.40
Armadylan steals the PJ Masks' vehicles.
66b	14b	"Moonwolfy"	Christian De Vita	Lisa Akhurst; Head writer : Simon Nicholson	Florent Cellai	20 September 2019	0.40
Kevin turns full wolfy on a trip to the moon.
67a	15a	"Clash on Mystery Mountain"	Christian De Vita	Brad Birch; Head writer : Brad Birch	Emmanuel Perez	11 October 2019	0.36
Night Ninja tricks Armadylan into stealing An Yu's bo staff and takes control of the Mountain again.
67b	15b	"A Teeny Weeny Problem"	Christian De Vita	Tony Cooke; Head writer : Simon Nicholson	Julien Ferry	11 October 2019	0.36
An Yu tries to train Teeny Weeny to be the Mystery Mountain Guardian assistant.
68a	16a	"Take Romeo Off The Road"	Christian De Vita	Danny Stack; Head writer : Simon Nicholson	Octavia Bauer	18 October 2019	0.32
When the PJ Masks get locked in the lab, it's up to PJ Robot to rescue them.
68b	16b	"Mission: PJ Seeker"	Christian De Vita	Lisa Akhurst; Head writer : Simon Nicholson	Christian Kuntz	18 October 2019	0.32
Gekko is on the case when animals keep disappearing from the city.
69a	17a	"Wolfy Powers"	Christian De Vita	Henry Gifford; Head writer : Simon Nicholson	Thomas Allart	8 November 2019	0.39
After their powers are stolen and given to the Wolfies, the PJ Masks team up with them to vanquish Romeo.
69b	17b	"Do the Gekko"	Christian De Vita	Christian De Vita; Head writer : Simon Nicholson	Emmanuel Perez	8 November 2019	0.39
Night Ninja hypnotizes all of the school kids with his special ninja dance by playing the flute.
70a	18a	"Armadylan, Action Hero"	Christian De Vita	Tim Bain; Head writer : Simon Nicholson	Florent Cellai	15 November 2019	0.33
Night Ninja uses Armadylan's dream of becoming a kung fu movie star to break into a museum.
70b	18b	"Super Muscles Show Off"	Christian De Vita	Ashley Mendoza; Head writer : Simon Nicholson	Julien Ferry	15 November 2019	0.33
While Gekko and Armadylan guard the city, their watch turns into a contest of strength.
71a	19a	"The Prank Wheelz"	Christian De Vita	Tim Bain; Head writer : Simon Nicholson	Julien Ferry	22 November 2019	0.30
The Wolfies turn their Wolf Wheelz into Prank Wheelz.
71b	19b	"Where's The Wolf Wheelz?"	Christian De Vita	Danny Stack; Head writer : Simon Nicholson	Octavia Bauer	22 November 2019	0.30
Luna Girl uses the Wolf Wheelz to wreak havoc, causing the Wolfies and the PJ Masks to work together.
72a	20a	"Villain of the Sky"	Christian De Vita	Lisa Akhurst; Head writer : Simon Nicholson	Thomas Allart	6 December 2019	0.34
The PJ Masks discover Romeo's Sky Factory and send PJ Robot as a mole.
72b	20b	"Protector of the Sky"	Christian De Vita	Tom Livingstone; Head writer : Simon Nicholson	Thomas Allart	6 December 2019	0.34
When the Sky Factory creates a pollution cloud over the city, the PJ Masks have a hard time blowing it away.
73	21	"The PJ Masks Save Christmas"	Christian De Vita	Brad Birch; Head writer: Brad Birch	Emmanuel Perez	6 December 2019	0.23
When Romeo decides to ruin Christmas for everyone after discovering he's on the naughty list, the PJ Masks partner with Santa Claus to save Christmas.
74a	22a	"Romeo's Melody"	Christian De Vita	Justin Cheynet; Head writer : Simon Nicholson	Thierry Sapyn	10 January 2020	0.35
The PJ Masks create special sound-muffling helmets after Romeo writes a catchy song that turns listeners into his servants.
74b	22b	"PJ Robot Takes Control"	Christian De Vita	Tom Livingstone; Head writer : Simon Nicholson	Florent Cellai	10 January 2020	0.35
PJ Robot tries to turn Romeo's flying factory into a flying party.
75a	23a	"PJ Sky Pirates"	Christian De Vita	Justine Cheynet; Head writer : Simon Nicholson	Octavia Bauer	17 January 2020	0.32
When Night Ninja steals the pirate equipment from Pirate Day at school, Catboy jeopardizes the PJ Masks' rescue mission.
75b	23b	"The Disappearing Ninjas"	Christian De Vita	Christian De Vita; Head writer : Simon Nicholson	Thierry Sapyn	17 January 2020	0.32
The PJ Masks investigate Night Ninja when the Ninjalinos keep disappearing.
76a	24a	"Gekko Everywhere"	Christian De Vita	Justine Cheynet; Head writer : Simon Nicholson	Julien Ferry	24 January 2020	0.26
Gekko has a teleporting crystal power that can go anywhere and it turns out its powers are too strong.
76b	24b	"Gekko Takes Charge"	Christian De Vita	Lisa Akhurst; Head writer : Simon Nicholson	Thomas Allart	24 January 2020	0.26
While Gekko tries to stop the Ninjalinos on his own, Night Ninja tries to take over HQ.
77a	25a	"Big Sister Motsuki"	Christian De Vita	Simon Nicholson; Head writer : Simon Nicholson	Emmanuel Perez	7 February 2020	0.39
Motsuki steals Romeo's Baby Beam and turns Luna Girl, Romeo and the PJ Masks into bad-behaved babies.
77b	25b	"PJ Party Crasher"	Christian De Vita	Tim Bain; Head writer : Simon Nicholson	Florent Cellai	7 February 2020	0.39
Luna Girl takes her girl friends to the moon when she's not invited to Owlette's pyjama party.
78a	26a	"Master of the Moat"	Christian De Vita	Henry Gifford; Head writer : Simon Nicholson	Basile Zumer and Benaacher Chamekh	13 March 2020	0.31
Romeo fishes a special crystal from out of the moat and becomes Master of the Sky.
78b	26b	"PJ Robot vs. Romeo"	Christian De Vita	Justine Cheynet; Head writer : Simon Nicholson	Thierry Sapyn	13 March 2020	0.31
PJ Robot and Romeo must compete when the Flying Factory is damaged.

=== Season 4 (2020–21) ===
No. overall	No. in season	Title	Directed by	Written by	Storyboard by	Original release date	U.S. viewers (millions)
79	1	"Heroes of the Sky" (Note: This episode is 47 minutes long.)	Christian De Vita	Simon Nicholson and Christian De Vita; Head writer : Simon Nicholson	Emmanuel Perez and Thomas Allart	15 May 2020	0.45
When Owlette imperils a mission and loses her memory as a result, Catboy and Gekko give up on her; the PJ Masks learn that the heart of being a hero is being a good friend.
80a	2a	"Who Let the Moths In?"	Christian De Vita	Gerard Foster; Head writer : Simon Nicholson	Florent Cellai	29 May 2020	0.35
The moths infiltrate HQ, and Gekko won't admit that he let them in until it is too late.
80b	2b	"Commander Meow"	Christian De Vita	Lisa Akhurst; Head writer : Simon Nicholson	Thierry Sapyn	29 May 2020	0.35
Catboy realizes that a true Cat Explorer puts his team before the discovery.
81a	3a	"Motsuki's Missing Sister"	Christian De Vita	Tony Cooke; Head writer : Simon Nicholson	Emmanuel Perez	15 June 2020	0.35
The PJs offer to help Motsuki find Luna, but miss a plot by Night Ninja in the process.
81b	3b	"Not So Ninja"	Christian De Vita	Tim Bain; Head writer : Simon Nicholson	Christian Kuntz	15 June 2020	0.35
When the ninjalinos lose their ninja powers, the PJ Masks teach them alternative skills.
82a	4a	"PJ Party Mountain"	Christian De Vita	Ashley Mendoza; Head writer : Simon Nicholson	Sophie Moulin	6 July 2020	0.44
The PJ Masks are enticed by a fake An Yu to break all the rules and have a party on Mystery Mountain.
82b	4b	"Wolfies of the Pagoda"	Christian De Vita	Justine Cheynet; Head writer : Simon Nicholson	Julien Ferry	6 July 2020	0.44
An Yu tries to domesticate the wild Wolfies.
83a	5a	"Master Fang's Secret"	Christian De Vita	Danny Stack; Head writer : Simon Nicholson	Christian Kuntz	20 July 2020	0.43
Armadylan and Catboy compete over an exclusive Master Fang comic, thinking it contains a hero secret.
83b	5b	"Aerodylan"	Christian De Vita	Danny Stack; Head writer : Simon Nicholson	Florent Cellai	20 July 2020	0.43
Armadylan loses the PJs' PJ Air Jet to Night Ninja.
84a	6a	"Asteroid Accident"	Christian De Vita	Simon Nicholson; Head writer : Simon Nicholson	Emmanuel Perez	3 August 2020	0.42
Newton, a new night-time hero, causes an asteroid accident. While trying to make it right, the PJ Masks, who, especially Owlette, thinks she caused it, meet this new friend from outer space!
84b	6b	"All About Asteroids"	Christian De Vita	Omari McCarthy; Head writer : Simon Nicholson	Thierry Sapyn	3 August 2020	0.42
Newton likes the PJ Masks, but also likes his solitude.
85a	7a	"Romeo's Space Machine"	Christian De Vita	Gerard Foster; Head writer : Simon Nicholson	Camille Aigloz	17 August 2020	0.36
The PJ Masks help Newton stop Romeo's space machine.
85b	7b	"Newton and the Ninjas"	Christian De Vita	Lisa Akhurst; Head writer : Simon Nicholson	Sophie Moulin	17 August 2020	0.36
After his experience with Night Ninja, Newton has sworn off fighting villains.
86a	8a	"Missing Space Rock"	Christian De Vita	Tim Bain; Head writer : Simon Nicholson	Julien Ferry	31 August 2020	0.45
Newton thinks Owlette stole a precious asteroid - but she's been framed by Romeo.
86b	8b	"Flying Factory Out of Control"	Christian De Vita	Henry Gifford; Head writer : Simon Nicholson	Christian Kuntz	31 August 2020	0.45
Romeo needs the PJs' help bringing his Flying Factory under control, but they don't trust him.
87a	9a	"Munki-gu"	Christian De Vita	Marc Seal; Head writer : Simon Nicholson	Thierry Sapyn	14 September 2020	0.39
Gekko tries to train a naughty monkey.
87b	9b	"Munki-gu in the City"	Christian De Vita	Simon Nicholson; Head writer : Simon Nicholson	Florent Cellai	14 September 2020	0.39
The PJ Masks' team spirit falls apart when Munki-gu sabotages their mission with pranks.
88a	10a	"Mission Munki-gu"	Christian De Vita	Tim Bain; Head writer : Simon Nicholson	Emmanuel Perez	5 October 2020	0.46
Catboy enlists Munki-gu to go aboard the Flying Factory to distract Romeo.
88b	10b	"Legend of the Wolfy Bone"	Christian De Vita	Ashley Mendoza; Head writer : Simon Nicholson	Camille Aigloz	5 October 2020	0.46
Kevin doesn't think he'll ever be top dog; he's not wolfy enough to find the legendary bone.
89a	11a	"Gekko vs. Armavillain"	Christian De Vita	Gerard Foster; Head writer : Simon Nicholson	Julien Ferry	19 October 2020	0.46
Desperate to prove himself, Gekko recruits Armadylan for extra training.
89b	11b	"Super Super Cat Speed"	Christian De Vita	Gerard Foster; Head writer : Simon Nicholson	Thierry Sapyn	19 October 2020	0.46
Catboy wants to increase his speed but there are consequences.
90a	12a	"Munki-gu's Dragon"	Christian De Vita	Justine Cheynet; Head writer : Simon Nicholson	Florent Cellai	2 November 2020	0.47
Munki-gu enchants a dragon float, turning it into a menace.
90b	12b	"Gekko Loves Lionel"	Christian De Vita	Marc Seal; Head writer : Simon Nicholson	Emmanuel Perez	2 November 2020	0.47
Lionel wants to play with Munki-gu instead of Gekko.
91a	13a	"Octobella"	Christian De Vita	Simon Nicholson; Head writer : Simon Nicholson	Sophie Moulin	16 November 2020	0.54
There's a new octopus-girl in the city, who wants to be friends with the PJ Masks, but her actions tell a different story.
91b	13b	"Octo-Trouble"	Christian De Vita	Tim Bain; Head writer : Simon Nicholson	Thierry Sapyn	16 November 2020	0.54
Octobella shape-shifts into Gekko, ruining Gekko's hero reputation.
92a	14a	"Star Buddies"	Christian De Vita	Gerard Foster; Head writer : Simon Nicholson	Emmanuel Perez and Camille Aigloz	30 November 2020	0.44
PJ Robot wants to be Newton's space buddy, but first he needs to power up!
92b	14b	"To the Moon and Back"	Christian De Vita	Amy Waddell; Head writer : Simon Nicholson	Christian Kuntz	30 November 2020	0.44
Catboy wants to be able to teleport to the moon like Motsuki.
93a	15a	"Magnet in the Moat"	Christian De Vita	Danny Stack; Head writer : Simon Nicholson	Julien Ferry	7 December 2020	0.33
Luna and Motsuki drop Luna's magnet in the moat and are silly enough to accept Octobella's help getting it.
93b	15b	"Motsuki Bugs Out"	Christian De Vita	Ashley Mendoza; Head writer : Simon Nicholson	Sophie Moulin	7 December 2020	0.33
Motsuki gets angry at being told she's too "buggy" to be in charge.
94a	16a	"Octobella's Garden"	Christian De Vita	Henry Gifford; Head writer : Simon Nicholson	Camille Aigloz	11 January 2021	0.47
Armadylan jumps at the chance to help Octobella, unaware that she's just using him.
94b	16b	"Sploshy Splash"	Christian De Vita	Catherine Williams; Head writer : Simon Nicholson	Emmanuel Perez	11 January 2021	0.47
Owlette learns it's better to rely on your instincts after she's lured into an evil trap.
95a	17a	"Teeny Weeny Returns"	Christian De Vita	Simon Nicholson; Head writer : Simon Nicholson	Emmanuel Perez	25 January 2021	0.33
Teeny Weeny attempts to make up for his past actions as a ninja by using his monster powers to defeat the rest of the other ninjas.
95b	17b	"Robo-Wolf"	Christian De Vita	Tim Bain; Head writer : Simon Nicholson	Basile Zumer	25 January 2021	0.33
The Wolfies find themselves in for more than they bargained for after they get a robotic servant.
96a	18a	"The Labours of Armadylan"	Christian De Vita	Omari McCarthy; Head writer : Simon Nicholson	Sophie Moulin	8 February 2021	0.33
Armadylan tries to fix a museum artifact without telling the PJ Masks.
96b	18b	"Lost in Space"	Christian De Vita	Christian De Vita; Head writer : Simon Nicholson	Christian Kuntz	8 February 2021	0.33
Romeo wants to create the ultimate trap for the PJ Masks.
97a	19a	"The Power of Monkey Chatter"	Christian De Vita	Henry Gifford; Head writer : Simon Nicholson	Emmanuel Perez	22 February 2021	0.26
The PJs need to meditate seriously, but they can't when Munki-gu gets involved.
97b	19b	"The Secret of Monkey Goodness"	Christian De Vita	Justine Cheynet; Head writer : Simon Nicholson	Florent Cellai	22 February 2021	0.26
The PJs try to stop Munki-gu's shenanigans, but get played by Night Ninja instead.
98a	20a	"Pharaoh Boy"	Christian De Vita	Simon Nicholson; Head writer : Simon Nicholson	Julien Ferry	8 March 2021	0.27
PJ Robot is scared of a mystical villain, Pharaoh Boy, but when the PJ Masks need him, he faces his fear.
98b	20b	"By My Pharaoh Feathers"	Christian De Vita	Ashley Mendoza; Head writer : Simon Nicholson	Julien Ferry	8 March 2021	0.27
Owlette takes offense when Romeo scoffs at the power of her feathers.
99a	21a	"Pharaoh's Chariot"	Christian De Vita	Amy Waddell; Head writer : Simon Nicholson	Florent Cellai	15 March 2021	0.35
Catboy wants to help solve a mystery, but Owlette and Gekko are only interested in his Super Speed.
99b	21b	"PJ Robot Malfunction"	Christian De Vita	Justine Cheynet; Head writer : Simon Nicholson	Emmanuel Perez	15 March 2021	0.35
Romeo takes over PJ Robot so he can use him against the PJs.
100a	22a	"The Mysterious Masks"	Christian De Vita	Christian De Vita; Head writer : Simon Nicholson	Sophie Moulin	22 March 2021	0.26
Romeo plans to use everyone's obsession with the new Jaden concert to take over the world.
100b	22b	"Battle Of The Fangs"	Christian De Vita	Tim Bain; Head writer : Simon Nicholson	Camille Aigloz	22 March 2021	0.26
When the Wolfies start their band, their sonic howls create new levels of destruction.
101a	23a	"Catboy's Cat"	Damien Dipta Kuoh	Catherine Williams; Head writer : Simon Nicholson	Julien Ferry	29 March 2021	0.45
Catboy is taken by the idea of having a cat sidekick.
101b	23b	"Mad With Moon Power"	Christian De Vita	Amy Waddell; Head writer : Simon Nicholson	Florent Cellai	29 March 2021	0.45
The PJ Masks think Luna and Motsuki are causing moon trouble, but it's Pharaoh Boy.
102a	24a	"Pharaoh and The Ninjalinos"	Christian De Vita	Simon Nicholson; Head writer : Simon Nicholson	Emmanuel Perez	31 May 2021	0.25
Night Ninja needs the PJ's help, and the heroes can't help taking advantage of it.
102b	24b	"Pharaoh's Boomerangs"	Christian De Vita	Henry Gifford; Head writer : Simon Nicholson	Julien Ferry	31 May 2021	0.25
Pharaoh Boy absorbs the PJ's powers into his boomerangs.
103	25	"Bubbles Of Badness"	Christian De Vita	Tim Bain and Simon Nicholson; Head writer : Simon Nicholson	Sophie Moulin and Emmanuel Perez	7 June 2021	0.36
Catboy and Owlette build a new vehicle of discovery and exploration, the PJ Sub; Octobella's vendetta against Gekko builds to unseen heights.

=== Season 5 (2021–22) ===
No. overall	No. in season	Title	Directed by	Written by	Storyboard by	Original release date	U.S. viewers (millions)
104	1	"Ninja Power Up"	Christian De Vita	Simon Nicholson; Head writer : Simon Nicholson	Christian Kuntz and Sophie Moulin	13 August 2021	0.37
The PJ Masks easily defeat the Ninjas and become over-confident in their powers; Night Ninja secretly plots to acquire PJ powers for himself.
105a	2a	"Luna Goes Too Far"	Christian De Vita	Catherine Williams; Head writer : Simon Nicholson	Julien Ferry	20 August 2021	0.22
Luna deviously persuades the PJ Masks into helping her with her plan to disempower Motsuki.
105b	2b	"Owly Tricks"	Christian De Vita	Gez Foster; Head writer : Simon Nicholson	Emmanuel Perez	20 August 2021	0.22
Romeo makes a hologram copy of Owly and sends the PJ Masks on a wild chase.
106a	3a	"Newton the Destructor"	Christian De Vita	Jasmine Richards; Head writer : Simon Nicholson	Florent Cellai	27 August 2021	0.19
Newton turns bad due to a psychoactive asteroid.
106b	3b	"Luna Kazoomer"	Christian De Vita	Tim Bain; Head writer : Simon Nicholson	Thomas Allart	27 August 2021	0.19
After he accidentally causes an asteroid to fall to Earth, Newton loses faith in his abilities as a hero. Meanwhile, Luna Girl plots to get back to the moon and reclaim her fortress.
107a	4a	"Baddie Bots"	Christian De Vita	Paul McKeown; Head writer : Simon Nicholson	Nicolò Polverelli	3 September 2021	0.27
Romeo invents robotic animal powers.
107b	4b	"Newton and the Animals"	Christian De Vita	Robert Vargas; Head writer : Simon Nicholson	Sophie Moulin	3 September 2021	0.27
Newton leads the PJ Pets on a mission to rescue the PJ Masks.
108a	5a	"Octobella Strikes Again"	Christian De Vita	Justine Cheynet; Head writer : Simon Nicholson	Julien Ferry	10 September 2021	0.21
Gekko is so anxious about facing a bully, that he stays home one night to avoid her.
108b	5b	"Octobella on the Loose"	Christian De Vita	Tim Bain; Head writer : Simon Nicholson	Emmanuel Perez	10 September 2021	0.21
Octobella creates a powerful octopus crystal that makes her a bigger threat than ever.
109a	6a	"Teeny Weeny to the Rescue"	Christian De Vita	Henry Gifford; Head writer : Simon Nicholson	Gilles Moreau	17 September 2021	0.13
Night Ninja kidnaps An Yu.
109b	6b	"Invisible Munki-gu"	Christian De Vita	Ashley Mendoza; Head writer : Simon Nicholson	Marc Sierra	17 September 2021	0.13
Someone's causing mischief. The PJ Masks blame the villains; the villains blame each other - but it's actually Munki-Gu, who's stolen an invisibility ring.
110a	7a	"Orticia Blooms"	Christian De Vita	Ben Ward; Head writer : Simon Nicholson	Christian Kuntz	24 September 2021	0.31
Romeo attempts to make the most of a failed experiment to his advantage.
110b	7b	"Orticia and the Pumpkins"	Christian De Vita	Catherine Williams; Head writer : Simon Nicholson	Sophie Moulin	24 September 2021	0.31
Gekko frantically tries to stop Orticia from sending his pumpkins back.
111a	8a	"Pirate Robot"	Christian De Vita	Simon Nicholson; Head writer : Simon Nicholson	Emmanuel Perez	29 October 2021	0.17
Gekko wants to play a pirate but is overshadowed by a pirate villain. Gekko wants to catch the villain but also wants to be the best pirate!
111b	8b	"Owlette, The Pirate Queen"	Christian De Vita	Marc Seal; Head writer : Simon Nicholson	Julien Ferry	29 October 2021	0.17
Owlette accidentally helps Pirate Robot.
112a	9a	"Catboy's Magic Trick"	Christian De Vita	Tim Bain; Head writer : Simon Nicholson	Florent Cellai	12 November 2021	0.20
Determined to perform a magic trick, Catboy finds a teleporting sarcophagus.
112b	9b	"Gekko the Croc"	Christian De Vita	Jasmine Richards; Head writer : Simon Nicholson	Laila Petersen-Jama	12 November 2021	0.20
Gekko is forced to be a sneaky crocodile when Pharaoh Boy has taken his friends prisoner.
113a	10a	"The Camping Trip"	Christian De Vita	Christian De Vita; Head writer : Simon Nicholson	Emmanuel Perez	7 January 2022	0.28
Greg is scared on a camping trip and thinks his nighttime powers will help him, but Orticia has something else in store.
113b	10b	"Pondweed Party"	Christian De Vita	Justine Cheynet; Head writer : Simon Nicholson	Sophie Moulin	7 January 2022	0.28
Orticia is invited to Octobella's cave.
114a	11a	"A Percival Problem"	Christian De Vita	Julie Bioget; Head writer : Simon Nicholson	Florent Cellai	18 February 2022	0.24
Gekko won't help Octobella when her shrimp rebels. In fact, he makes it worse!
114b	11b	"Luna Girl's Sleepover"	Christian De Vita	Justine Cheynet; Head writer : Simon Nicholson	Julien Ferry	18 February 2022	0.24
Amaya's friends, Marie and Jenny, get entranced and imperiled by Luna Girl.
115a	12a	"Dragon Dance"	Christian De Vita	Clémentine Le Nai; Head writer : Simon Nicholson	Sophie Moulin	18 March 2022	0.16
An Yu won't show Munki-gu how to do the dragon dance, but Night Ninja will.
115b	12b	"An Yu and the Cave Stones"	Christian De Vita	Jasmine Richards; Head writer : Simon Nicholson	Emmanuel Perez	18 March 2022	0.16
An Yu needs to find a magic stone in the city.
116a	13a	"Midnight Snack Attack"	Christian De Vita	Tim Bain; Head writer : Simon Nicholson	Amanda Sun	8 April 2022	0.12
Gekko tries to get Pirate Robot to be a chef instead of a pirate.
116b	13b	"The Voyage of the Golden Asteroid"	Christian De Vita	Ben Ward; Head writer : Simon Nicholson	Laura Pannetier	8 April 2022	0.12
Newton is desperate to study a rare asteroid, but Pirate Robot has seen it too and he is planning a hijack!
117	14	"Carly and Cartoka"	Christian De Vita	Simon Nicholson; Head writer : Simon Nicholson	Kévin Roussel and Florent Cellai	15 April 2022	0.19
Catboy wants to outspeed new villains Carly and Cartoka.
118a	15a	"The PJ Riders"	Christian De Vita	Tim Bain; Head writer : Simon Nicholson	Paul-Henri Ferrant	22 April 2022	0.25
The PJs are desperate to get their vehicles back, but are having trouble taming their Crystal Animals.
118b	15b	"Flashcar in the Sky"	Christian De Vita	Henry Gifford; Head writer : Simon Nicholson	Julien Ferry	22 April 2022	0.25
The PJs get caught up in a battle between Romeo and the Twins.
119a	16a	"Luna's Mega Moth"	Christian De Vita	Justine Cheynet; Head writer : Simon Nicholson	Christian Kuntz	6 May 2022	0.14
Luna Girl wants to get back at Motsuki and get to the moon by badness and deviousness.
119b	16b	"Captain Pirate Robot"	Christian De Vita	Baptiste Renard; Head writer : Simon Nicholson	Emmanuel Perez	6 May 2022	0.14
To get his ship back from Octobella, Pirate Robot becomes the captain of the PJ Masks.
120a	17a	"Crash Track Trick"	Christian De Vita	Catherine Williams; Head writer : Simon Nicholson	Sophie Moulin	17 June 2022	N/A
Catboy wants to try out his Wildstripes' incredible speed.
120b	17b	"Gekko's Speedy Lizard"	Christian De Vita	Marc Seal; Head writer : Simon Nicholson	Laura Pannetier	17 June 2022	N/A
Gekko wants to stop a speedy Night Ninja.
121a	18a	"Night Ninja's School of Ninja Naughtiness"	Christian De Vita	Christian De Vita; Head writer : Simon Nicholson	Florent Cellai	8 July 2022	0.17
Night Ninja sets up a school for villains.
121b	18b	"The Jolly Ninjalino"	Christian De Vita	Ben Ward; Head writer : Simon Nicholson	Emmanuel Perez	8 July 2022	0.17
Pirate Robot seeks help when Night Ninja steals his hat.
122	19	"The Power of Mystery Mountain"	Christian De Vita	Christian De Vita and Simon Nicholson; Head writer : Simon Nicholson	Christian Kuntz and Octavia Bauer	26 August 2022	0.18
Mystery Mountain breaks out of its dimension and floats over the city.
123a	20a	"Slow and Sneaky"	Christian De Vita	Tim Bain; Head writer : Simon Nicholson	Julien Ferry	9 September 2022	0.15
Romeo challenges Carly and Cartoka to a race, but it's all part of a sneaky plan to steal speed crystals.
123b	20b	"The PJ Riders Save the Day"	Christian De Vita	Tim Bain; Head writer : Simon Nicholson	Sophie Moulin	9 September 2022	0.15
The PJ Riders get jealous when the PJs plan to restore their vehicles.
124a	21a	"Moon Marooned"	Christian De Vita	Ben Ward; Head writer : Simon Nicholson	Laura Pannetier	16 September 2022	0.15
After not listening to the warnings, Pirate Robot gets himself and Newton captured.
124b	21b	"Newton and the Star Splat"	Christian De Vita	Julie Bioget; Head writer : Simon Nicholson	Florent Cellai	16 September 2022	0.15
Newton creates a powerful Star Splat.
125	22	"Trick or Treat"	Christian De Vita	Catherine Williams; Head writer : Simon Nicholson	Christian Kuntz	25 September 2022	0.33
Romeo has tricked Orticia to prank the PJ Masks on Halloween night.
126	23	"Heroes of the Road"	Christian De Vita	Simon Nicholson and Christian De Vita; Head writer : Simon Nicholson	Sophie Moulin and Emmanuel Perez	21 October 2022	0.18
The PJ Masks wanted to race with Carly and Cartoka in order to get the ultimate zoom crystal that they did not listen to Newton Star and the PJ riders so they have fallen into a trap set by Romeo, Luna Girl and Night Ninja.
127a	24a	"Newton's Discovery"	Christian De Vita	Jasmine Richards; Head writer : Simon Nicholson	Julien Ferry	11 November 2022	0.16
Romeo has taken Newton Star's Power and has captured the PJ Masks.
127b	24b	"Romeo's Pirate Trap"	Christian De Vita	Tony Cooke; Head writer : Simon Nicholson	Laura Pannetier	11 November 2022	0.16
Pirate Robot has collected the machinery trash from the Flying Factory to upgrade the Spinner of the Sky but was fallen into a trap set by Romeo.
128	25	"Luna's Moon Attack"	Christian De Vita	Justine Cheynet; Head writer : Simon Nicholson	Florent Cellai	18 November 2022	N/A
Luna Girl has taken Motsuki's power to get back to the moon and stole Newton Star's asteroids while Catboy and Gekko did not trust Owlette and Newton Star that it is a plan of Luna Girl.

=== Season 6: Power Heroes (2023–24) ===
No. overall	No. in season	Title	Directed by	Written by	Storyboard by	Original release date	U.S. viewers (millions)
129	1	"Heroes Everywhere"	Christian De Vita	Simon Nicholson and Christian De Vita; Head writer : Simon Nicholson	Emmanuel Perez, Julien Ferry and Florent Cellai	19 April 2023 (Note: This episode made its international premiere on TF1 in France on 9 April 2023.)	0.19
An asteroid heads for Earth, with the power to turn our heroes into villains. But help arrives from an unexpected source.
130a	2a	"The Whiff of Badness"	Christian De Vita	Lady Aria Grey; Head writer : Simon Nicholson	Olivier Renard	29 April 2023 (Note: This episode was released on Disney+ on 19 April 2023.)	0.12
Ice Cub smells something fishy in the air, but it quickly disappears. Ice Cub persists, eager to prove his amazing sense of smell.
130a	2b	"An Yu's Birthday"	Christian De Vita	Catherine Williams; Head writer : Simon Nicholson	Octavia Bauer	29 April 2023	0.12
Night Ninja tries to trick An Yu into destroying the museum on her 2,001st birthday.
131a	3a	"Newton's New Asteroid"	Christian De Vita	Romain Van Liemt; Head writer : Simon Nicholson	Barbara Palmitesta	6 May 2023	0.16
Newton Star discovers a seemingly new asteroid and decides to inspect it alone. It turns out to be a trap set up by Romeo.
131b	3b	"Moon Music"	Christian De Vita	Ella Greenhill; Head writer : Simon Nicholson	Basile Zumer	6 May 2023	0.16
Luna Girl swaps voices with Amaya, putting the latter's performance during the next day's school concert in jeopardy.
132a	4a	"I Scream for Wolfies"	Christian De Vita	Tim Bain; Head writer : Simon Nicholson	Julien Ferry	13 May 2023	0.20
Catboy encourages Ice Cub to show off his powers. The Wolfies take advantage of Ice Cub's snowballs.
132b	4b	"An Yu and the Gekkos"	Christian De Vita	Jasmine Richards; Head writer : Simon Nicholson	Olivier Renard	13 May 2023	0.20
When things aren't the way she is used to, An Yu finds it hard to concentrate.
133a	5a	"Pirate Ice Storm"	Christian De Vita	Tony Cooke; Head writer : Simon Nicholson	Octavia Bauer	20 May 2023	0.15
133b	5b	"Lilyfay"	Christian De Vita	Catherine Williams; Head writer : Simon Nicholson	Serge Tanguy	20 May 2023	0.15
134	6	"Iceworld"	Christian De Vita	Simon Nicholson; Head writer : Simon Nicholson	Basile Zumer and Octavia Bauer	27 May 2023	0.12
135a	7a	"It's a Cat Thing"	Christian De Vita	Jasmine Richards; Head writer : Simon Nicholson	Olivier Renard	3 June 2023	0.13
135b	7b	"The Dance of Two Cats"	Christian De Vita	Liz Daramola; Head writer : Simon Nicholson	Luc Blanchard and Sylvie Sanna	3 June 2023	0.13
136a	8a	"Space Fairy Hero"	Christian De Vita	Catherine Williams; Head writer : Simon Nicholson	Serge Tanguy	8 July 2023	N/A
136b	8b	"Lilyfay and the Lake"	Christian De Vita	Lady Aria Grey; Head writer : Simon Nicholson	Barbara Palmitesta	8 July 2023	N/A
137a	9a	"Luna the Sun Girl"	Christian De Vita	Ben Ward; Head writer : Simon Nicholson	Basile Zumer	19 August 2023	0.16
137b	9b	"Cats on Wheels"	Christian De Vita	Simon Raynaud; Head writer : Simon Nicholson	Julien Ferry	19 August 2023	0.16
138	10	"Heroes of Iceworld"	Christian De Vita	Simon Nicholson and Christian De Vita; Head writer : Simon Nicholson	Florent Cellai, Julien Ferry and Emmanuel Perez	20 September 2023	0.18
139	11	"Gloop the Third"	Christian De Vita	Simon Nicholson; Head writer : Simon Nicholson	Olivier Renard and Serge Tanguy	14 October 2023	0.12
140a	12a	"Wolfy Riders"	Christian De Vita	Lady Aria Grey; Head writer : Simon Nicholson	Octavia Bauer	11 November 2023	0.18
140b	12b	"Gekko Muscles In"	Christian De Vita	Justine Cheynet; Head writer : Simon Nicholson	Barbara Palmitesta	11 November 2023	0.18
141	13	"The Christmas Ninjalinos"	Christian De Vita	Justine Cheynet; Head writer : Simon Nicholson	Octavia Bauer and Damien Dipita Kuoh	2 December 2023	0.14
On the night of December 22nd, Night Ninja ventures into Iceworld and forces Santa Claus to do what he says. If Santa isn't freed soon enough, the children of the world may not get their requested presents!
142a	14a	"The Super Gloopster"	Christian De Vita	Tim Bain; Head writer : Simon Nicholson	Damien Dipita Kuoh	30 December 2023 (Note: This episode was released on Disney+ on 13 December 2023.)	0.10
142b	14b	"Gloop in the Moat"	Christian De Vita	Ella Greenhill; Head writer : Simon Nicholson	Serge Tanguy	30 December 2023	0.10
Gloop the Third has glooped the moat. Gekko and Octobella have to set aside their vendetta in order to defeat Gloop the Third and undo the gloopy mess.
143a	15a	"Pharaoh's Mountain"	Christian De Vita	Catherine Williams; Head writer : Simon Nicholson	Julien Ferry	6 January 2024	0.10
143b	15b	"Robot the Hero"	Christian De Vita	Simon Raynaud; Head writer : Simon Nicholson	Olivier Renard	6 January 2024	0.10
144	16	"Heroes of Space"	Christian De Vita	Simon Nicholson and Christian De Vita; Head writer : Simon Nicholson	Emmanuel Perez and Florent Cellai	15 January 2024	0.15
145a	17a	"Let it Howl"	Christian De Vita	Elisa Létrilliart; Head writer : Simon Nicholson	Octavia Bauer	27 January 2024	0.13
145b	17b	"Wolfy Treasure Hunt"	Christian De Vita	Liz Daramola; Head writer : Simon Nicholson	Serge Tanguy	27 January 2024	0.13
146a	18a	"Bastet by the Book"	Christian De Vita	Justine Cheynet; Head writer : Simon Nicholson	Damien Dipita Kuoh	10 February 2024	0.17
Bastet finds a book about the secrets of desert magic. Little does she know that the book is a trap set up by Pharaoh Boy!
146b	18b	"Romeovision"	Christian De Vita	Ben Ward; Head writer : Simon Nicholson	Julien Ferry	February 10, 2024	0.17
Romeo traps Night Ninja and the PJ Masks in a television.
147a	19a	"Moth Boy"	Christian De Vita	Tim Bain; Head writer : Simon Nicholson	Olivier Renard	24 February 2024	0.10
After over a year of absence, Armadylan returns. He reflects his past clumsy self and attempts to reinvent himself into someone new: Moth Boy.
147b	19b	"The Curse of Armadylan"	Christian De Vita	Tim Bain; Head writer : Simon Nicholson	Octavia Bauer	24 February 2024	0.10
Bastet mistakenly believes Armadylan is an identical ancient villain.
148a	20a	"Flashcar to the Moon"	Christian De Vita	Joël Maitrot; Head writer : Simon Nicholson	Serge Tanguy	9 March 2024	0.15
148b	20b	"Catboy's Tiny Problem"	Christian De Vita	Elisa Létrilliart; Head writer : Simon Nicholson	Damien Dipita Kuoh	9 March 2024	0.15
149a	21a	"The Sun Factory"	Christian De Vita	Julie Bioget; Head writer : Simon Nicholson	Julien Ferry	23 March 2024	0.11
149b	21b	"Catboy Does It All"	Christian De Vita	Justine Cheynet; Head writer : Simon Nicholson	Olivier Renard	23 March 2024	0.11
After a failed mission with the expanded Power Heroes team, Catboy doubts his ability to lead the team and decides to tackle his next mission solo.
150a	22a	"The Catastrophe Stone"	Christian De Vita	Vanina Marsot; Head writer : Simon Nicholson	Octavia Bauer	6 April 2024	N/A
150b	22b	"The Legend of Moon Pirate"	Christian De Vita	Simon Raynaud and Simon Nicholson; Head writer : Simon Nicholson	Damien Dipita Kuoh	6 April 2024	N/A
151	23	"Return to Planet Gloop"	Christian De Vita	Tony Cooke; Head writer : Simon Nicholson	Serge Tanguy and Julien Ferry	15 April 2024	0.12
With all of his former plans foiled by the PJ Masks, rather rookie villain Gloop the Third accepts help from evil mastermind Romeo!
