= Emerico Luna =

Emerico Luna (16 January 1882 – 4 December 1963) was an Italian anatomist and professor at the University of Palermo. His studies included histology, embryology, and development of mitochondria, histology of the nervous system and connective tissues and was a founder of the Italian Anatomical Society. He was a pioneer of clinical radiology.

Luna was born Palermo to Giovanni and Rosalia Mallina. He went to the University of Palermo to study medicine and graduated in 1906. He became an assistant to Versari at the institute of human anatomy. In 1912 he became a lecturer in histology and taught anatomy when Giuseppe Levi moved to Turin in 1919-20. He became a professor in 1922. His students included Ignazio Fazzari (1889-1986), Alberto Monroy, and Arcangelo Pasqualino. He published a treatise on neurology in collaboration with Dante Bertelli in 1931 as part of the series Trattato di anatomia umana.
