= Rune Larsson =

Rune Larsson may refer to:

- Rune Larsson (athlete), Swedish sprinter and hurdler
- Rune Larsson (referee), Swedish football referee
- Rune Larsson (footballer), Swedish football, ice hockey and bandy player
