= PJ Masks =

Animated children's television series

- Also known as: PJ Masks: Power Heroes (season 6)
- French: Pyjamasques
- Genre: Action-adventure; Superhero; Science fiction; Science fantasy; Comedy
- Created by: Olivier Dumont
- Based on: Les Pyjamasques by Romuald Racioppo
- Directed by: Christian De Vita; Wilson Dos Santos (S1)
- Voices of: Jacob Ewaniuk; Jacob Ursomarzo; Roman Lutterotti; Evan O'Donnell; Kai Harris; Addison Holley; Kyle Harrison Breitkopf; Benjamin Hum; Rain Janjua
- Theme music composer: Eric Renwart; David Freedman
- Composers: Fabrice Aboulker; Jean-Francois Berger
- Countries of origin: France; United Kingdom
- Original languages: French; English
- No. of seasons: 6
- No. of episodes: 151 (and 45 shorts) (list of episodes)

Production
- Executive producers: Olivier Dumont; Laura Clunie; Beth Gardiner (S2–6)
- Producers: Guillaume Hellouin; Corinne Kouper; Caroline Souris (S2–6); Jean-Pierre Quenet (S2–6); Stanislas Renaudeau d'Arc (S5–6)
- Running time: 24 minutes 47 minutes (4-part episodes)
- Production companies: Entertainment One; Hasbro Entertainment (S6); Frog Box Productions; TeamTO; Walt Disney EMEA Productions Limited

Original release
- Network: Disney Channel/Disney Junior/Disney+ (worldwide); France 5 (France; S1–5); TF1 (France; S6)
- Release: 18 September 2015 – 15 April 2024

PJ Masks (French: Pyjamasques) is an animated superhero children's television series based on the Les Pyjamasques book series by Romuald Racioppo. Produced by Frog Box and Hasbro Entertainment in collaboration with TeamTO and Walt Disney EMEA Productions Limited, its production has the participation of France Télévisions during the first five seasons and TF1 Group from the sixth season and onwards. The series is broadcast worldwide on Disney Branded Television's Disney Channel and Disney Junior channels; in its home country of France, it airs on France 5 and TF1.

In the United States, the series was broadcast on Disney Junior for six seasons, beginning on 18 September 2015 and concluding on 15 April 2024.

On 30 December 2019, Hasbro acquired Entertainment One for a $3.8 billion deal, making it the first Disney Junior program under the ownership of Hasbro.

== Premise ==
In the town of Tarabiscoville, Amaya, Greg, and Connor become the superhero team PJ Masks when night falls in order to fight their many enemies and rivals. The team consists of animal-themed heroes. Amaya becomes Owlette (an owl), Greg becomes Gekko (a lizard), and Connor becomes Catboy (a cat).

The team's regular rogues' gallery includes Romeo, Luna Girl, Night Ninja, The Wolfy Kids, Motsuki, Octobella, Pharaoh Boy, Munki-gu, Orticia (former), Pirate Robot (former), The Speedy Twins and Gloop the Third (former).

== Characters ==
=== PJ Masks ===
The main characters as they appear in the series (from left to right): Gekko, Catboy, and Owlette.

PJ Masks (known as "PJs" for short) is the titular superhero team that fights crime at night to keep it from ruining people's days.

- Connor / Catboy (voiced by Jacob Ewaniuk in Season 1, Jacob Ursomarzo in Season 2–"Best Friends Forever", Roman Lutterotti in "Meet An Yu"–Season 4, Evan O'Donnell in Season 5, and Kai Harris in Season 6) – Connor is a blue-eyed boy with brown hair. When he transforms, he wears a blue cat costume. His powers include super speed, enhanced hearing, enhanced jumping ability, throwing furballs, and throwing stripes that can be used as ropes.
- Amaya / Owlette (voiced by Addison Holley) – Amaya is a brown-eyed bespectacled girl. She has dark brown hair with a pink, wing-shaped hair clip. When she transforms she wears a red owl costume. Her powers include nighttime vision, the ability to fly, the ability to make a strong gust of wind from her wings, and super feathers.
- Greg / Gekko (voiced by Kyle Harrison Breitkopf in Seasons 1–3 and the shorts, Benjamin Hum in "HQ Tour" and Seasons 4–5, and Rain Janjua in Season 6) – Greg is a green-eyed, blonde-haired boy. When he transforms, he wears a green lizard costume with a thick reptilian tail and fins on top of his head. His powers are super strength, invisibility (though some may see him by noticing irregularities in the background), sticking on walls for scaling, and shields.
- PJ Robot (voiced by Juan Luis Bonilla) – A robot who is in charge of the PJ Masks' HQ. Originally created by Romeo to spy on the heroes, it defected and switched sides.
- PJ Pets - The pets of the PJ Masks. In the episode "Ninja Power Up", the PJ Pets gained the same abilities as their owners.
  - Alley Cat - The pet cat of Connor.
  - Owly - The pet owl of Amaya.
  - Lionel - The pet lizard of Greg.
- PJ Riders - The PJ Riders are spirit animals who reside in the PJ Masks' totem. They gain physical forms to serve as the PJ Masks' mode of transportation after the Speedy Twins destroyed their vehicles.
  - Cat Stripe King - Connor's blue panther-like spirit animal.
  - Eagle Owl - Amaya's red owl-like spirit animal.
  - Power Lizard - Greg's Komodo dragon-like spirit animal.

=== Power Heroes ===
In Season 6, the PJ Masks form a new superhero team: the Power Heroes, to increase crime fighting. The team includes the original PJ Masks (Catboy, Owlette, Gekko and PJ Robot), some of their superhero allies and their new allies introduced in the season.

- Dylan / Armadylan (voiced by Max Calinescu in Season 2–"Armadylan Zen", Cristian Perri in "Arma-Leader"–"Gekko Everywhere", Avery Esteves in "Master Fang's Secret"–"Gekko vs Armavillain", TBA in "Octobella's Garden", and Vin Volpe in Season 6) – A strong armadillo-like boy who wants to be a hero, but his inexperience causes him to mess up, especially when he cannot control his anger. His abilities include super-strength, producing earthquakes, and transforming into a ball to roll on surfaces or travel underground. He temporarily becomes a member of the Power Heroes in the Season 6 episode "Moth Boy". In "The Curse of Armadylan", he decides to continue working alone but still promises to help out whenever the others need him.
- An Yu (voiced by Kari Wong) – A Chinese dragon who can also take the form of a young samurai girl, and was trapped inside the Dragon Gong for 1,000 years before being freed by Night Ninja. She wields a bo staff that can also turn into a magic flute, and lives in an Oriental-themed forest which can only be entered through portals.
- Newton / Newton Star (voiced by Shomoy James Mitchell in Seasons 4–5 and Housten Daghighi in Season 6) – A space boy who emerged from a freak asteroid accident. The PJ Masks first met him in space. He also appears in the daytime as a bespectacled boy who often hangs out in the Museum's Library. His powers include shields, surfing with asteroids, creating white orbs, and the ability to fly and breathe in space without any special gear.
- Ivan / Ice Cub (voiced by Nylan Parthipan) – A paraplegic classmate of Connor, Amaya and Greg who is newly moved to the city. He is nice to everyone. Ivan gained powers from an asteroid shard, turning him into the polar bear-themed hero Ice Cub. During the day, Ivan moves around in a wheelchair and sometimes with crutches. As Ice Cub, he has power over ice and uses leg braces and a snowboard for mobility.
- Lilyfay (voiced by Zoe Hatz) – A space fairy who met Newton Star after he helped her escape from Luna Girl and Motsuki and joined the Power Heroes only three episodes later. She studies asteroids and guards them from being stolen by villains and used for evil. Similar to Newton Star, her powers include creating white orbs, flight, surfing with asteroids and breathing in space, but she can also create stellar snow and charge crystals with her power.
- Bastet (voiced by Michaela Mohamud) – Also known as "The Sun Cat", an ancient Egyptian serval-themed heroine that was magically created to fight Pharaoh Boy. She joined the Power Heroes after Catboy and An Yu (mostly Catboy) mistook her for a villain working with Pharaoh Boy, but the three worked together to defeat him. Her main power is the Sun Disc, a weapon made of light that can be used as shield, teleportation, throwing disc and for heat.

=== Allies ===
- Teeny Weeny Ninjalino (voiced by Robert Tinkler) – A tiny and cute ninja who was supposed to spy on the PJ Masks, but won Owlette and Gekko's affection.
- Santa Claus (voiced by Ron Pardo) – Santa is the jolly man who appeared in "The PJ Masks Save Christmas", where he teamed up with the PJ Masks.
- Orticia (voiced by Markeda McKay) - A humanoid plant girl who can control and grow plants. The ancient seed that she came out of was stolen and planted by Romeo, who intended to make her his henchman. However, Orticia defected and decided to go her own way. As of "Pondweed Party", Orticia learned the true meaning of friendship, reformed, and became friends with the PJ Masks.
  - Baby Pumpkins - Three pumpkins that work for Orticia after she stole them from Gekko's garden.
- Pirate Robot (voiced by Wyatt White) - A robot accidentally created by Romeo to find fabulous treasures like a real pirate ever since some of Night Ninja's pirate props fell on in. Prior to this incident, Romeo wanted it to be his chef as he was getting sick of the cooking that Robot does. He refers to Owlette as his pirate queen. As of "Owlette, the Pirate Queen", he shifted from villain to hero.

=== Villains ===
- Romeo (voiced by Emily Thorne in Season 1, Carter Thorne in the shorts and Season 2–"Owlette Slips Up", Simon Pirso in "Motsuki the Best"–Season 4, and Callum Shoniker in Seasons 5–6) – A mad scientist who plans on world domination with all the inventions he creates. He is depicted as a genius.
  - Robot (voiced by Ron Pardo) - A robot who is Romeo's henchman.
  - Robette (voiced by Kirrilee Berger) - A female counterpart of Robot.
  - Toolbox – A walking toolbox who works with Romeo, and in case of making inventions Toolbox carries Romeo's tools.
  - Spy-Bot – A cubical bot that works for Romeo, who often used Spy-Bot to spy on the PJ Masks.
  - Fly Bots – Small, flying robots which resemble PJ Robot before he reformed and guard Romeo's Sky Factory.
  - Naughty Bots - Naughty Bots are robots disguised as presents, but they destroy everything related to Christmas like presents and Christmas decorations
  - Robo-PJ Masks - As the robotic versions of the PJ Masks, they all have the same powers but with the addition of paralyzing laser eyes.
- Luna Girl (voiced by Brianna D'Aguanno) – A moon-themed villain with platinum blond hair who lives in a palace on the moon. In "Best Friends Forever", it is revealed that her Luna Magnet powers give her the power to breathe in space. Her main weapons are her Luna Magnet and Luna Board which she uses as a mode of transportation.
  - Motsuki (voiced by Hattie Kragten) - An anthropomorphic moth whom Luna Girl regards as a little sister. Originally unnamed and one of Luna Girl's army of small moths, Motsuki was granted a special position among her fellow minions as well as a name by her big sister. She was later cocooned in crystal and evolved into a more humanoid form capable of speech.
  - The Moths (voice actors unknown in Seasons 1–2, Hattie Kragten in Seasons 3–6) - The minions of Luna Girl.
- Night Ninja (voiced by Trek Buccino in Season 1, Devan Cohen in the shorts and Season 2–"Do the Gekko" and Jacob Soley in "Armadylan, Action Hero"–Season 6) – A ninja. He uses partially-dried latex balls called Sticky Splats to trap his opponents and smoke bombs to teleport from one place to another. He is also acrobatic and can perform telekinesis.
  - Ninjalinos (vocal effects provided by Rob Tinkler) - The foot soldiers of Night Ninjas.
- The Wolfy Kids - Usually referred to as "the Wolfies", Rip (voiced by Shechinah Mpumlwana), Howler (voiced by Kaden Stephen in Season 2–"Wolfies of the Pagoda" and Matthew Mucci in "Munki-gu in the City"–Season 6), and Kevin (voiced by Ethan Pugiotto) are a trio of werewolf siblings who like to cause mischief. They can shoot out red energy rings which would blow away things in a gale-like fashion. The Wolfy Kids often make plans to become full wolves, which Kevin does achieve for a short time. In "Good Wolfy", Kevin becomes a good wolfy, and naturally he is different from the other two.
- Octobella (voiced by Michela Luci) – An octopus-themed girl who lives in her lair in the moat. Upon meeting the PJ Masks at first, she appears interested in becoming friends with them. But when she learned that Gekko obtained a crystal from her abode and develop some powers, she sees them as thieves and becomes their enemy. Her abilities include throwing underwater tornadoes, invisibility, making various spells using crystals, hypnotizing people to play using glowing orbs, and sonic screams, and giving others the ability to breathe underwater.
  - Percival (voiced by Rob Tinkler) - A mumbling lobster who is Octobella's henchman.
- Munki-gu (voiced by Daniel Pathan) – A mischievous little monkey who loves to cause trouble, play, and prank on others. He was previously transformed into a stone statue for 1,000 years by a sorcerer as a punishment for being too naughty. In the present day, Munki-gu was freed by Gekko after he patted his head three times by accident. His powers include imitating other people's voices, flying with his magical boots, and pulling an infinite amount of bananas out of nowhere.
- Pharaoh Boy (voiced by Logan Nicholson) - The mummy of a mystical young pharaoh who came through a portal discovered on a Sphinx statue at the museum that comes from "The World Beyond". When he first met the PJ Masks, he started to be bossy towards them and take control of their powers and do what he wants them to do using his Staff of Ra.
- The Speedy Twins - Carly (voiced by Emma Ho) and Cartoka (voiced by Ian Ho) are a duo of twin speedy siblings from the world of Zoomzania and are the arch-enemies of Catboy. They have a Flashcar combined with PJ Mask's original three vehicles that they stole in "Carly and Cartoka" and they had them until the PJ Riders helped them retrieve them.
- Gloop the Third

== Episodes ==
| Series | Segments | Episodes | Originally released | |
| Series | Segments | Episodes | First released | Last released |
|---|---|---|---|---|
| 1 | 52 | 26 | 18 September 2015 | 17 February 2017 |
| 2 | 50 | 26 | 15 January 2018 | 22 March 2019 |
| 3 | 48 | 26 | 19 April 2019 | 13 March 2020 |
| 4 | 48 | 26 | 15 May 2020 | 7 June 2021 |
| 5 | 44 | 25 | 13 August 2021 | 18 November 2022 |
| 6 | 39 | 23 | 19 April 2023 | 15 April 2024 |

== Production ==
PJ Masks is a French/British/Canadian co-production by Entertainment One, Frog Box, and TeamTO. The series was renewed for a second season consisting of 52 11-minute segments in June 2016; it premiered on 15 January 2018. The series was renewed for a third season on 22 January 2018; originally meant to premiere in June 2019, it instead premiered on 19 April that same year. The series was renewed for a fourth season on 5 June 2019; originally meant to premiere sometime in April 2020, it instead premiered on 15 May 2020 (possibly due to the COVID-19 pandemic). The series was renewed for a fifth season on 18 January 2020, which premiered on 13 August 2021. The series was renewed for a sixth season on 18 June 2021, which premiered on 9 April 2023 in France and April 19, 2023 in the U.S.

== Streaming services ==
Seasons of PJ Masks are currently available worldwide on the Disney+, Netflix, and HBO Max streaming services.

| Streaming service | Content | Initial availability |
|---|---|---|
| Disney+ | | Seasons 1 & 2: 12 November 2019 (launch); Season 3: 12 April 2020; Season 4: 25 June 2021; Season 5: 20 October 2021; Season 6: 19 April 2023 |
| Netflix | Seasons 2–4 | Season 2: 15 January 2020; Season 3: 19 April 2021; Season 4: 15 May 2022 |
| HBO Max (Latin America only) | Season 1 | Season 1: 29 September 2025 |
