= Les Pyjamasques =

Children's picture book series

- Author: Romuald Racioppo
- Country: France
- Language: French
- Genre: Action; Superhero; History; Fantasy
- Publisher: Éditions Gallimard
- Published: 2007–2021

Les Pyjamasques (English: The PJ Masks) is a children's book series by French author Romuald Racioppo. The series first started with Les Pyjamasques et le Grogarou on March 29, 2007, and is published by Éditions Gallimard. The series is intended for children between three and six years old.

== Premise ==
Three 6-year-old friends, Sacha, Greg, and Amaya, lead regular lives during the day, but in the night they transform into superheroes and have amazing adventures. Sacha becomes Yoyo with a cat-like costume and powers, Greg becomes Gluglu with a lizard-like costume and powers, and Amaya becomes Bibou with an owl-like costume and powers and live in a Totem Pole-like fortress.

== Books ==
- Les Pyjamasques et le Grogarou (2007)
- Les Pyjamasques au zoo (2007)
- Les Pyjamasques et Roméo Mécano (2007)
- Les Pyjamasques et Lilifée (2007)
- Les Pyjamasques et Utupë, l'esprit de la forêt (2008)
- Le secret des Pyjamasques (2008)
- Les Pyjamasques et les mascrapules (2009)
- Les Pyjamasques et le père Noël rebelle (2009)
- Les Pyjamasques et le marchand de sable (2010)
- Les Pyjamasques et la machine à bisous (2010)
- Les Pyjamasques et la soupe à la citrouille (2011)
- La petite soeur des Pyjamasques (2011)
- Les Pyjamasques et le sablotin (2012)
- Les Pyjamasques et le croque-chaussettes (2012)
- Les Pyjamasques et le rêveur de l'arc-en-ciel (2013)
- Les Pyjamasques et Magistère la sorcière (2014)
- Les Pyjamasques et Energuman (2014)
- Les Pyjamasques et le robot-blizzard (2015)
- Les Pyjamasques et l'opération zéro (2016)
- La Légende des Pyjamasques (2016)
- Les Pyjamasques et le cadeau de Sorceline (2016)
- Les Pyjamasques et la graine d'Orticia (2017)
- L'école des Pyjamasques (2018)
- Les Pyjamasques et la momie d'Apophis, Tome 1 (2018)
- Les Pyjamasques et la momie d'Apophis, Tome 2 (2019)
- Les Pyjamasques sauvent la nature (2019)
- Le grand livre d'Apophis (2020)
- Le cristal des Pyjamasques (2020)
- Les Pyjamasques fêtent Noël (2021)

== TV adaptation ==
The series has been adapted for television under the title PJ Masks, which premiered on September 18, 2015, on Disney Channel & Disney Junior in the US, and first aired on December 12, 2015, on France 5 for the first five seasons and TF1 for the sixth on April 9, 2023, in France.
