= Rune Pedersen =

Rune Pedersen may refer to:

- Rune Pedersen (referee) (born 1963) Norwegian football referee, who officiated at the 1994 FIFA World Cup
- Rune Pedersen (footballer) (born 1979) Danish football goalkeeper
- Rune Pedersen (Norwegian footballer) (born 1952) who played for SK Brann
