= Deluna =

Deluna

- Marisol Deluna, American fashion designer

DeLuna

- Carlos DeLuna (1962–1989), executed (Texas, USA) after controversial conviction
- Kat DeLuna, American pop/R&B singer

De Luna

- Celeste De Luna (born 1974), American printmaker, educator

de Luna

- Álvaro de Luna (c. 1389–1453), Spanish politician
- Jeff de Luna (born 1984), Filipino pool player
- Pedro de Luna (1328–1423), Avignon Pope Benedict XIII
- Tristán de Luna y Arellano (1519–1571), Spanish Conquistador

Translated from Spanish to English, "De" means "Of" and "Luna" means "Moon".
