= List of Vampire: The Masquerade books =

Game books for Vampire: The Masquerade

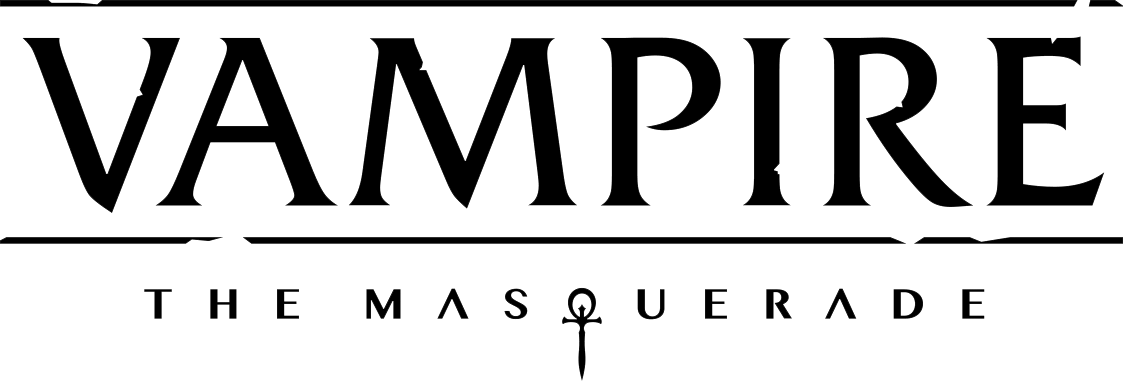
Vampire: The Masquerade fifth edition logo

Vampire: The Masquerade is a tabletop role-playing game in the World of Darkness series, in which players take the roles of vampires. It was originally released by White Wolf Publishing in 1991, and with new editions released in 1992 (second edition), 1998 (Revised Edition), 2011 (20th Anniversary Edition), and 2018 (fifth edition), each of which updated the game rules. These have been supported with supplementary game books, expanding the game mechanics and setting.

The books from the game's original run were mostly published by White Wolf Publishing, sometimes under their imprint Black Dog Game Factory for books considered more adult. Supplements for the 20th Anniversary Edition were published by Onyx Path Publishing, a company formed by ex–White Wolf Publishing staff; books for the fifth edition are published by Renegade Game Studios together with series owner Paradox Interactive, and by collaborators including Modiphius Entertainment and Onyx Path Publishing.

The supplements include the By Night series, each covering a city as portrayed in the setting; the Clanbook series, covering the vampire clans; guides to the game; sourcebooks for sects and factions; and various other books. The supplements often introduce gradual change to the game's setting, advancing the overarching narrative. Adventure modules have been released, but only rarely, as White Wolf Publishing has preferred to let storytellers (Note: The person leading the game is called the "storyteller" in World of Darkness games, a role called "gamemaster" or "dungeon master" in other role-playing games.) construct their own adventures, an uncommon choice in tabletop role-playing games that they could afford due to the World of Darkness series' success and longevity. In the mid-1990s, new World of Darkness books were often top sellers, and by 2001, Vampire: The Masquerade was the second best selling tabletop role-playing game after TSR, Inc.'s Dungeons & Dragons.

== Books ==
=== First edition (1991–1992) ===
Game books for Vampire: The Masquerade's first edition
Title	Original release	ISBN	Publisher	Notes
Vampire: The Masquerade	July 1991	0-96277-906-7	White Wolf Publishing	Core rulebook for the game's first edition
Blood Nativity	July 1991	1-887801-29-4	Atlas Games	Adventure set in Cleveland. A short introductory story. Written pseudonymously by White Wolf Publishing staff. Published simultaneously with the core rulebook.
Ashes to Ashes	Q3 1991	0-9627-790-7-5	White Wolf Publishing	Adventure set in Chicago. Follow-up to story in the first edition's rulebook.
Alien Hunger	1991	1-56504-015-5	White Wolf Publishing	Adventure set in Denver, Colorado, featuring a vampiric Louis Pasteur
Blood at Dawn	1991	0-9627790-9-1	White Wolf Publishing	Adventure set in Gary, Indiana. Bundled with storyteller screen.
Blood Bond	1991	1-56504-020-1	White Wolf Publishing	Adventure set in Chicago. A short follow-up to Ashes to Ashes.
Chicago by Night	1991	1-56504-000-7	White Wolf Publishing	Sourcebook for Chicago
The Succubus Club	1991	1-56504-011-2	White Wolf Publishing	Sourcebook for the Succubus Club, a vampire club in Chicago
The Player's Guide	February 1992	1-56504-012-0	White Wolf Publishing	Guide for players. Introduces the clans Assamite, Setite, Giovanni, and Ravnos, and the bloodline Salubri.
Milwaukee by Night	March 1992	1-56504-017-1	White Wolf Publishing	Sourcebook for Milwaukee
Awakening: Diablerie Mexico	April 1992	1-56504-018-X	White Wolf Publishing	Adventure set in Mexico
The Storytellers Handbook	May–July 1992	1-56504-024-4	White Wolf Publishing	Guide for storytellers on leading games
The Hunters Hunted	July 1992	1-56504-020-1	White Wolf Publishing	Sourcebook for vampire hunters
Mummy	August 1992	1-56504-026-0	White Wolf Publishing	Sourcebook for mummies. Followed by a second edition in 1997 for the World of Darkness series in general, and by the game Mummy: The Resurrection in 2001.

=== Second edition (1992–1998) ===
Game books for Vampire: The Masquerade's second edition
Title	Original release	ISBN	Publisher	Notes
Vampire: The Masquerade	August 1992	1-56504-029-5	White Wolf Publishing	Core rulebook for the game's second edition
The Players Guide to the Sabbat	December 1992	1-56504-042-2	White Wolf Publishing	Guide for players on the Sabbat
Clanbook: Brujah	January 1993	1-56504-038-4	White Wolf Publishing	Sourcebook for clan Brujah
Who's Who Among Vampires: Children of the Inquisition	February 1993	1-56504-039-2	White Wolf Publishing	Sourcebook containing character biographies
Clanbook: Gangrel	March 1993	1-56504-046-5	White Wolf Publishing	Sourcebook for clan Gangrel
The Anarch Cookbook	April 1993	1-56504-048-1	White Wolf Publishing	Sourcebook for the Anarch Movement
Under a Blood Red Moon	June 1993	1-56504-049-X	White Wolf Publishing	Adventure about the tension between vampires and werewolves in Chicago. Crossover with Werewolf: The Apocalypse.
Chicago by Night	July 1993	1-56504-051-1	White Wolf Publishing	Sourcebook for Chicago. Second edition. Updated to account for events in the setting since the first edition, such as the character Prince Lodin's death in Under a Blood Red Moon.
Clanbook: Malkavian	August 1993	1-56504-052-X	White Wolf Publishing	Sourcebook for clan Malkavian
Storytellers Handbook to the Sabbat	August 1993	1-56504-054-6	White Wolf Publishing	Guide for storytellers on leading games with Sabbat characters
Dark Alliance: Vancouver	October 1993	1-56504-059-7	White Wolf Publishing	Sourcebook for Vancouver, and the relations between vampire and werewolf communities there. Crossover with Werewolf: The Apocalypse.
Clanbook: Nosferatu	December 1993	1-56504-064-3	White Wolf Publishing	Sourcebook for clan Nosferatu
Dark Colony	December 1993	1-56504-056-2	White Wolf Publishing	Sourcebook for New England
Contacts and Victims	1993	1-56504-055-4	White Wolf Publishing	Booklet with characters. Bundled with a storyteller screen.
The Vampire Players Guide	1993	1-56504-053-8	White Wolf Publishing	Guide for players. Introduces the clans Assamite, Followers of Set, Giovanni, and Ravnos, and the bloodlines Salubri, Daughters of Cacophony, and Samedi, to the second edition. Update of The Players Guide.
Bloody Hearts: Diablerie Britain	January 1994	1-56504-074-0	White Wolf Publishing	Sourcebook for Great Britain and diablerie – drinking of another vampire's blood. Initially planned to be titled Diablerie England.
Clanbook: Toreador	February–April 1994	1-56504-095-3	White Wolf Publishing	Sourcebook for clan Toreador
Clanbook: Tremere	April–June 1994	1-56504-115-1	White Wolf Publishing	Sourcebook for clan Tremere
New Orleans by Night	May 1994	1-56504-096-1	White Wolf Publishing	Sourcebook for New Orleans
Berlin by Night	August–October 1994	1-56504-075-9	White Wolf Publishing	Sourcebook for Berlin
Clanbook: Ventrue	August 1994	1-56504-124-0	White Wolf Publishing	Sourcebook for clan Ventrue
The Kindred Most Wanted	August 1994	1-56504-124-0	White Wolf Publishing	Sourcebook for characters on the Camarilla's most wanted list
Los Angeles by Night	September 1994	1-56504-130-5	White Wolf Publishing	Sourcebook for Los Angeles
Elysium	October–December 1994	1-56504-155-0	White Wolf Publishing	Sourcebook for vampire elders
Dirty Secrets of the Black Hand	December 1994	1-56504-142-9	White Wolf Publishing	Sourcebook for the Black Hand
Necropolis: Atlanta	1994	1-56504-164-X	White Wolf Publishing	Sourcebook for the land of the dead in Atlanta. Crossover with Wraith: The Oblivion.
Clanbook: Assamite	February 1995	1-56504-214-X	White Wolf Publishing	Sourcebook for clan Assamite
D.C. by Night	April–June 1995	1-56504-225-5	White Wolf Publishing	Sourcebook for Washington, D.C.
Giovanni Chronicles: The Last Supper	June–August 1995	1-56504-250-6	White Wolf Publishing	Adventure about clan Giovanni, set in the Carpathians in 1444. Crossover with Vampire: The Dark Ages. Published under the Black Dog Game Factory imprint.
The Inquisition	June 1995	1-56504-228-X	White Wolf Publishing	Sourcebook for the modern Inquisition
Clanbook: Setites	August–October 1995	1-56504-215-8	White Wolf Publishing	Sourcebook for clan Setite
Clanbook: Tzimisce	December 1995	1-56504-216-6	White Wolf Publishing	Sourcebook for clan Tzimisce
Prince's Primer	March–April 1996	1-56504-201-8	White Wolf Publishing	Sourcebook for vampiric rule over cities
Book of the Kindred	May 1996	1-56504-869-5	White Wolf Publishing	Introduction to the setting for new players. Tie-in product for the Vampire: The Masquerade television series Kindred: The Embraced.
Giovanni Chronicles II: Blood & Fire	May 1996	1-56504-251-4	White Wolf Publishing	Adventure about clan Giovanni, set in 1666 in Italy. An independent sequel to Giovanni Chronicles: The Last Supper. Published under the Black Dog Game Factory imprint.
Clanbook: Lasombra	June 1996	1-56504-211-5	White Wolf Publishing	Sourcebook for clan Lasombra
Die Stadt, Das Blut, Der Tod: Frankfurt bei Nacht	1996	3-93161-211-2	Feder & Schwert	Sourcebook for Frankfurt, by the game's German publisher. Title translates to "The City, the Blood, the Death: Frankfurt by Night".
Montreal by Night	January 1997	1-56504-224-7	White Wolf Publishing	Sourcebook for Montreal. Published under the Black Dog Game Factory imprint.
Clanbook: Ravnos	February 1997	1-56504-217-4	White Wolf Publishing	Sourcebook for clan Ravnos
Ghouls: Fatal Addiction	June–July 1997	1-56504-230-1	White Wolf Publishing	Sourcebook for ghouls
Clanbook: Giovanni	July 1997	1-56504-218-2	White Wolf Publishing	Sourcebook for clan Giovanni
Kindred of the East	February 1998	1-56504-232-8	White Wolf Publishing	Major rulebook for Asian vampires, requiring another World of Darkness rulebook to be played. Supported with its own line of supplements. Updated for Vampire: The Masquerade Revised Edition with Kindred of the East Companion.
Giovanni Chronicles III: The Sun Has Set	May 1998	1-56504-258-1	White Wolf Publishing	Adventure about clan Giovanni, set in London in 1848 and in Egypt in 1882. Published under the Black Dog Game Factory imprint.

=== Revised Edition (1998–2004 and 2011) ===
Game books for Vampire: The Masquerade Revised Edition
Title	Original release	ISBN	Publisher	Notes
Introductory Kit	August 1998	—N/a	White Wolf Publishing	Short introduction to the game
Vampire: The Masquerade Revised Edition	October 1998	1-56504-249-2	White Wolf Publishing	Core rulebook for the game's Revised Edition
Wiener Blut: Wien bei Nacht	1998	3-93161-235-X	Feder & Schwert	Sourcebook for Vienna, by the game's German publisher. Title translates to "Viennese Blood: Vienna by Night".
Guide to the Camarilla	February 1999	1-56504-261-1	White Wolf Publishing	Sourcebook for the Camarilla and guide to using them in campaigns
Guide to the Sabbat	March 1999	1-56504-263-8	White Wolf Publishing	Sourcebook for the Sabbat and guide to using them in campaigns
Children of the Night	May 1999	1-56504-244-1	White Wolf Publishing	Sourcebook containing character biographies.
Giovanni Chronicles IV: Nuova Malattia	June 1999	1-56504-252-2	White Wolf Publishing	Adventure about clan Giovanni, set in 1929, 1959, 1972, and 1999. Published under the Black Dog Game Factory imprint.
Time of Thin Blood	June–August 1999	1-56504-245-X	White Wolf Publishing	Sourcebook for the thin-blooded vampires of the 14th and 15th generations
Transylvania Chronicles III: Ill Omens	August–October 1999	1-56504-292-1	White Wolf Publishing	Collection of adventures. Third in a series connecting Vampire: The Dark Ages and Vampire: The Masquerade.
Encyclopædia Vampirica	October 1999	3-931612-87-2	Feder & Schwert	Encyclopedia over the Vampire: The Masquerade and Vampire: The Dark Ages setting. Produced by the German publisher Feder & Schwert as Encyclopædia Vampyrica, and later published by White Wolf Publishing in English on July 15, 2002 (ISBN 1-58846-227-7).
Vampire Storytellers Companion	1999	1-56504-259-X	White Wolf Publishing	Sourcebook for bloodlines not included in the core book, including the Daughters of Cacophony, Salubri, and Samedi, and for new skills and equipment. Bundled with storyteller screen
Vampire Storytellers Handbook	January 2000	1-56504-264-6	White Wolf Publishing	Guide for storytellers, and a companion to the core rulebook. Update of The Storytellers Handbook for Revised Edition.
Blood Magic: Secrets of Thaumaturgy	February 2000	1-56504-246-8	White Wolf Publishing	Sourcebook for blood magic
Transylvania Chronicles IV: The Dragon Ascendant	March 2000	1-56504-293-X	White Wolf Publishing	Collection of adventures. Fourth in a series connecting Vampire: The Dark Ages and Vampire: The Masquerade.
Nights of Prophecy	April 2000	1-56504-229-8	White Wolf Publishing	Collection of five adventures
Clanbook: Nosferatu	May 2000	1-56504-266-2	White Wolf Publishing	Sourcebook for clan Nosferatu. Update of Clanbook: Nosferatu for Revised Edition.
Clanbook: Malkavian	June 12, 2000	1-56504-268-9	White Wolf Publishing	Sourcebook for clan Malkavian. Update of Clanbook: Malkavian for Revised Edition.
Clanbook: Brujah	June 26, 2000	1-56504-267-0	White Wolf Publishing	Sourcebook for clan Brujah. Update of Clanbook: Brujah for Revised Edition.
Clanbook: Gangrel	July 10, 2000	1-56504-265-4	White Wolf Publishing	Sourcebook for clan Gangrel. Update of Clanbook: Gangrel for Revised Edition.
Blood Treachery	July 24, 2000	1-56504-409-6	White Wolf Publishing	Sourcebook for the feud between the Order of Hermes and clan Tremere. Crossover with Mage: The Ascension.
Clanbook: Toreador	September 2000	1-56504-269-7	White Wolf Publishing	Sourcebook for clan Toreador. Update of Clanbook: Toreador for Revised Edition.
Clanbook: Tremere	October 2000	1-56504-254-9	White Wolf Publishing	Sourcebook for clan Tremere. Update of Clanbook: Tremere for Revised Edition
Clanbook: Ventrue	October 2000	1-56504-255-7	White Wolf Publishing	Sourcebook for clan Ventrue. Update of Clanbook: Ventrue for Revised Edition.
Clanbook: Assamite	November 2000	1-56504-256-5	White Wolf Publishing	Sourcebook for clan Assamite. Update of Clanbook: Assamite for Revised Edition.
Clanbook: Tzimisce	March 5, 2001	1-58846-202-1	White Wolf Publishing	Sourcebook for clan Tzimisce. Update of Clanbook: Tzimisce for Revised Edition.
Clanbook: Followers of Set	April 2, 2001	1-58846-204-8	White Wolf Publishing	Sourcebook for clan Followers of Set. Update of Clanbook: Setites for Revised Edition.
Clanbook: Giovanni	April 16, 2001	1-58846-207-2	White Wolf Publishing	Sourcebook for clan Giovanni. Update of Clanbook: Giovanni for Revised Edition.
Clanbook: Ravnos	May 2001	1-58846-209-9	White Wolf Publishing	Sourcebook for clan Ravnos. Update of Clanbook: Ravnos for Revised Edition.
Midnight Siege	June 2001	1-58846-219-6	White Wolf Publishing	Sourcebook for conflicts between members of the Camarilla and the Sabbat
Gilded Cage	July 2001	1-58846-216-1	White Wolf Publishing	Sourcebook for vampires' economical and political influence on human society
Sins of the Blood	August 20, 2001	1-58846-217-X	White Wolf Publishing	Sourcebook for forms of heresy within vampire society
New York by Night	November 12, 2001	1-58846-218-8	White Wolf Publishing	Sourcebook for New York City
Cairo by Night	December 3, 2001	1-58846-215-3	White Wolf Publishing	Sourcebook for Cairo and Egypt in general
Clanbook: Lasombra	2001	1-58846-201-3	White Wolf Publishing	Sourcebook for clan Lasombra. Update of Clanbook: Lasombra for Revised Edition.
Archons & Templars	April 2002	1-58846-224-2	White Wolf Publishing	Sourcebook for the enforcers of the Camarilla (archons) and the Sabbat (templars and inquisitors)
San Francisco by Night	June 3, 2002	1-58846-231-5	White Wolf Publishing	Sourcebook for San Francisco. Crossover with Kindred of the East. Initially announced ten years earlier in 1992.
Mexico City by Night	August 2002	1-58846-228-5	White Wolf Publishing	Sourcebook for Mexico City
State of Grace	November 25, 2002	1-58846-234-X	White Wolf Publishing	Sourcebook for vampires' faiths and beliefs
Blood Sacrifice: The Thaumaturgy Companion	2002	1-58846-222-6	White Wolf Publishing	Sourcebook for blood magic. Companion book to Blood Magic: Secrets of Thaumaturgy.
Guide to the Anarchs	2002	1-58846-223-4	White Wolf Publishing	Guide to the Anarch Movement
Havens of the Damned	2002	1-58846-225-0	White Wolf Publishing	Sourcebook for vampires' shelters, where they sleep during the day
Caine's Chosen: The Black Hand	January 2003	1-58846-236-6	White Wolf Publishing	Sourcebook for the Black Hand
Counsel of Primogen	March 3, 2003	1-58846-237-4	White Wolf Publishing	Sourcebook for Camarilla politics and primogen counsels
Kindred of the Ebony Kingdom	April 28, 2003	1-58846-239-0	White Wolf Publishing	Vampire: The Masquerade sourcebook and standalone game about African vampires
The Succubus Club: Dead Man's Party	June 2, 2003	1-58846-240-4	White Wolf Publishing	Sourcebook for social interactions in vampire society, and for the Succubus Club, a traveling vampire club in the United States
Chaining the Beast	July 2003	1-58846-241-2	White Wolf Publishing	Sourcebook for alternative paths of morality for vampires
Lair of the Hidden	August 11, 2003	1-58846-242-0	White Wolf Publishing	Sourcebook for a group of vampires from the Inconnu. Part of the Time of Judgment series.
Vampire Players Guide	September 29, 2003	1-58846-243-9	White Wolf Publishing	Guide for players
The Red Sign	October 2003	1-58846-245-5	White Wolf Publishing	Sourcebook for campaigns involving vampires and mages. Crossover with Mage: The Ascension. Part of the Time of Judgment series.
The Ventrue Chronicle	November 24, 2003	1-58846-244-7	White Wolf Publishing	Adventure about clan Ventrue, set in the Dark Ages, in the Victorian era, and in modern times
Vampire: Gehenna	January 14, 2004	1-58846-246-3	White Wolf Publishing	Collection of adventures about Gehenna, an apocalyptic event for vampires. Part of the Time of Judgment series, and an ending to Vampire: The Masquerade.
Vampire Translation Guide	May 2011	—N/a	White Wolf Publishing	Guide for porting elements between Vampire: The Masquerade and Vampire: The Requiem

=== 20th Anniversary Edition (2011–2018) ===
Game books for Vampire: The Masquerade 20th Anniversary Edition
Title	Original release	ISBN	Publisher	Notes
Vampire: The Masquerade 20th Anniversary Edition	September 15, 2011	—N/a	White Wolf Publishing	Core rulebook for the game's 20th Anniversary Edition.
Dust to Dust	November 11, 2011	—N/a	White Wolf Publishing	Adventure set in Gary, Indiana. Follow-up to Ashes to Ashes.
V20 Companion	August 23, 2012	—N/a	Onyx Path Publishing	Sourcebook for titles, technology, game mechanics, and the World of Darkness setting. Financed through crowdfunding.
Children of the Revolution	October 26, 2012	—N/a	Onyx Path Publishing	Sourcebook containing character biographies. Financed through crowdfunding.
The Hunters Hunted II	July 17, 2013	—N/a	Onyx Path Publishing	Sourcebook for vampire hunters. Follow-up to The Hunters Hunted. Financed through crowdfunding.
Anarchs Unbound	June 23, 2014	—N/a	Onyx Path Publishing	Sourcebook for the Anarch Movement. Financed through crowdfunding.
Rites of the Blood	July 9, 2014	—N/a	Onyx Path Publishing	Sourcebook for vampiric rituals
Dread Names, Red List	June 24, 2015	—N/a	Onyx Path Publishing	Sourcebook for characters on the Camarilla's most wanted list. Update of The Kindred Most Wanted. Financed through crowdfunding.
Lore of the Clans	December 23, 2015	—N/a	Onyx Path Publishing	Sourcebook for the thirteen vampire clans
The Black Hand: A Guide to the Tal'Mahe'Ra	April 16, 2016	—N/a	Onyx Path Publishing	Sourcebook for the Black Hand
Ghouls & Revenants	June 1, 2016	—N/a	Onyx Path Publishing	Sourcebook for ghouls and revenants
Vampire: Ready Made Characters	July 6, 2016	—N/a	Onyx Path Publishing	Sourcebook containing playable characters and story hooks. Financed through crowdfunding.
Lore of the Bloodlines	April 26, 2017	—N/a	Onyx Path Publishing	Sourcebook for nine vampire bloodlines. Follow-up to Lore of the Clans. Financed through crowdfunding.
Beckett's Jyhad Diary	January 10, 2018	—N/a	Onyx Path Publishing	Sourcebook for the World of Darkness setting, bridging the gap between the 20th Anniversary and fifth editions of Vampire: The Masquerade. Financed through crowdfunding.

=== Fifth edition (2018–present) ===
Game books for Vampire: The Masquerade's fifth edition
Title	Original release	ISBN	Publisher	Notes
Vampire: The Masquerade	August 2, 2018	978-1-912200-93-1	White Wolf Publishing	Core rulebook for the game's fifth edition. Distributed by Modiphius Entertainment.
The Monster(s)	September 2018	—N/a	Modiphius Entertainment	Adventure serving as introduction to the game. Released digitally.
Anarch	November 7, 2018	978-1-912200-99-3	White Wolf Publishing	Sourcebook for the Anarch Movement. Distributed by Modiphius Entertainment. Recalled and edited due to references to the anti-gay purges in Chechnya, after which series owner Paradox Interactive no longer let White Wolf Publishing develop the series in-house.
Camarilla	November 7, 2018	978-1-912200-98-6	White Wolf Publishing	Sourcebook for the Camarilla. Distributed by Modiphius Entertainment. Recalled and edited due to references to the anti-gay purges in Chechnya, after which series owner Paradox Interactive no longer let White Wolf Publishing develop the series in-house.
New Blood Starter Pack	January 2020	—N/a	Modiphius Entertainment	Introduction to the game, with an adventure, brief rules, and pre-made characters. Released digitally.
Chicago by Night	February 19, 2020	978-1-950082-42-1	Onyx Path Publishing	Sourcebook for Chicago and clan Lasombra. Third edition. Financed through crowdfunding.
Fall of London	March 2020	978-1-912743-53-7	Modiphius Entertainment	Adventure set in London in 2012 during a vampire hunter attack
The Chicago Folios	April 1, 2020	—N/a	Onyx Path Publishing	Sourcebook for vampire mysteries, story hooks, character biographies, and blood sorcery rituals. Follow-up to Chicago by Night.
Let the Streets Run Red	November 18, 2020	978-1-957311-10-4	Onyx Path Publishing	Sourcebook containing four adventures, coverage of Chicago, Milwaukee, Indianapolis, and Gary, and characters
Vampire: The Masquerade Companion	December 16, 2020	—N/a	Paradox Interactive	Sourcebook introducing the clans Ravnos, Salubri, and Tzimisce to the fifth edition, as well as rules for ghouls and mortal humans. Released digitally for free.
Cults of the Blood Gods	January 13, 2021	978-1-952531-04-0	Onyx Path Publishing	Sourcebook for clan Hecata and vampiric religions, cults, and philosophies. Financed through crowdfunding.
Children of the Blood	May 19, 2021	978-1-957311-09-8	Onyx Path Publishing	Sourcebook containing characters. Financed through crowdfunding.
Trails of Ash and Bone	June 23, 2021	—N/a	Onyx Path Publishing	Collection of four adventures set in Copenhagen, Atlantic City, Florence, and Birmingham, and pre-made characters. Financed through crowdfunding.
Sabbat: The Black Hand	October 27, 2021	978-1-735993-88-1	Renegade Game Studios	Sourcebook for the Sabbat, the Gehenna War, and paths of enlightenment
Auld Sanguine	December 8, 2021	—N/a	Renegade Game Studios	Adventure set on New Year's Eve. Released digitally for free.
Forbidden Religions	January 26, 2022	—N/a	Renegade Game Studios	Sourcebook for vampiric cults. Financed through crowdfunding.
Storyteller's Toolkit	February 2022	978-1-735993-85-0	Renegade Game Studios	Booklet with advice for storytellers on leading games
Second Inquisition	March 16, 2022	978-1-735993-89-8	Renegade Game Studios	Sourcebook for hidden organizations of vampire hunters
Boston by Night	May 19, 2022	—N/a	Nacon	Sourcebook for Boston. Released digitally together with the video game Vampire: The Masquerade – Swansong.
Midnight Kiss	December 21, 2022	—N/a	Renegade Game Studios	Adventure set on New Year's Eve. Released digitally for free.
Player's Guide	June 2023	978-1-737496-23-6	Renegade Game Studios	Compilation and expansion of all the vampire clans
Blood Sigils	October 2023	978-1-957311-22-7	Renegade Game Studios	Sourcebook for blood sorcery and thin-blood alchemy
Blood-Stained Love	January 9, 2024	978-1-957311-42-5	Renegade Game Studios	Sourcebook for tools, techniques and advice on how to bring romance to the game
The Crimson Gutter	May 2024	978-1-957311-46-3	Renegade Game Studios	Starter chronicle containing 21 stories designed to help novices
Gehenna War	August 2024	978-1-957311-56-2	Renegade Game Studios	Sourcebook for creating action-focused characters and chronicles
In Memoriam	May 2025	978-1-957311-70-8	Renegade Game Studios	Sourcebook for crafting older vampire characters
Tattered Facade	November 2025	978-1-957311-73-9	Renegade Game Studios	Sourcebook for expanding the systems to deepen the horror within the game
Live from the Succubus Club	March 2026	978-1-957311-78-4	Renegade Game Studios	Sourcebook for vampires in the entertainment industry and nomadic vampires
Courts of the Damned	October 2026	978-1-957311-91-3	Renegade Game Studios	Sourcebook for portraying vampire politics

== Compilations ==
Vampire: The Masquerade game book compilations
Title	Original release	ISBN	Publisher	Notes
Chicago Chronicles Volume 1	June–July 1996	1-56504-219-0	White Wolf Publishing	Compilation of Chicago by Night's first edition and The Succubus Club
Chicago Chronicles Volume 2	July–September 1996	1-56504-220-4	White Wolf Publishing	Compilation of Chicago by Night's second edition and Under a Blood Red Moon
Chicago Chronicles Volume 3	September–October 1996	1-56504-221-2	White Wolf Publishing	Compilation of Ashes to Ashes, Blood Bond, and Milwaukee by Night
Rage Across the World Volume 2	1996	1-56504-320-0	White Wolf Publishing	Compilation of Dark Alliance: Vancouver and the Werewolf: The Apocalypse book Rage Across Australia
Diablerie	March–April 1997	1-56504-238-7	White Wolf Publishing	Compilation of Awakening: Diablerie Mexico and Bloody Hearts: Diablerie Britain
Cities of Darkness Volume 1	May–June 1997	1-56504-233-6	White Wolf Publishing	Compilation of D.C. by Night and New Orleans by Night
Cities of Darkness Volume 2	September–October 1997	1-56504-234-4	White Wolf Publishing	Compilation of Berlin by Night and Los Angeles by Night
Cities of Darkness Volume 3	January 1998	1-56504-235-2	White Wolf Publishing	Compilation of Alien Hunger and Dark Colony
War of Ages	August 1998	1-56504-243-3	White Wolf Publishing	Compilation of The Anarch Cookbook and Elysium
Giovanni Saga I	2000	1-56504-253-0	White Wolf Publishing	Compilation of Giovanni Chronicles: The Last Supper and Giovanni Chronicles II: Blood & Fire. Published under the Black Dog Game Factory imprint.
