= Runa =

Runa may refer to:

== People ==
=== American ===
- Runa Lucienne (born 1988), model and actress

=== Bengali ===
- Runa Islam (born 1970), artist
- Runa Laila (born 1952), singer
- Runa Basu, cricketer

=== Canadian ===
- Runa Reta (born 1980), squash player

=== Japanese ===
- Runa Akiyama (1954-2014), actress
- Runa Imai (born 2000), swimmer
- Runa Takamura (1952–2004), J-pop singer, actress, and dancer

=== Nepalese ===
- Runa Pradhan (born 1984), swimmer

=== Norwegian ===
- Runa Førde (born 1933), painter, illustrator and graphic artist
- Runa Vikestad (born 1984), footballer

=== Fictional characters ===
- Runa, an Utgar Minion Kyrie character from the HeroScape miniature wargame
- Rūna, a Valkyrior in Marvel Comics
- Runa Rindo from Fairy Navigator Runa
- Runa Kuribayashi, a second managers of Jōzenji High School Volleyball in Haikyū!!
- Runa Tokisaka, from the anime The SoulTaker
- Runa Yomozuki from the manga/anime series Kakegurui
- Runa Sasaki (佐々木瑠奈, Sasaki Runa) is one of the characters in Loving Yamada at Lv999! series, written and illustrated by Mashiro.
- The alternate name of Luna from the Casshan/Casshern series
- The alternate name of Luna Platz from Mega Man Star Force

== Places ==
- Runa, Portugal, a freguesia in Torres Vedras, Portugal
- Runa, West Virginia

== Other uses ==
- Runa (given name), the origins of the name
- Runa (band), a Celtic-music band from Newtown, PA
- SS Runa, a British cargo ship in service 1949–64
- Runa LLC, an American and Ecuadorian beverage company
- A person who speaks Quechua

== See also ==
- Rune (disambiguation)
- Rune (given name)
