= Second Inquisition =

2022 role-playing game supplement

- Cover art
- Illustrators: Mark Kelly (cover artist and interiors)
- Publishers: Renegade Game Studios
- Publication: March 16, 2022
- Genres: Tabletop role-playing game supplement
- Parent games: Vampire: The Masquerade (5th edition)
- Series: World of Darkness
- Website: Official website
- ISBN: 978-1-735993-89-8

Second Inquisition is a tabletop role-playing game supplement released on March 16, 2022, by Renegade Game Studios, for use with the game Vampire: The Masquerade, and is part of the larger World of Darkness series. It describes globally connected groups of vampire hunters in the game's setting, and how to create antagonists belonging to them for game campaigns.

== Overview ==
Second Inquisition is a sourcebook for use with the fifth edition of the horror tabletop role-playing game Vampire: The Masquerade, where players take the roles of vampires. It describes the Second Inquisition and its backgrounds – globally connected churches and agencies in the setting that hunt vampires, including the American black project Firstlight and the Society of Leopold – with information for storytellers (Note: The person leading the game is called the "storyteller" in World of Darkness games, a role called "gamemaster" or "dungeon master" in other role-playing games.) to use to create antagonists from the Second Inquisition for their game campaigns. The book also describes artifacts and coterie tactics that players can use to fight the organization.

== Production ==
Second Inquisition was originally announced in December 2018 by Modiphius Entertainment; World of Darkness series owner Paradox Interactive had licensed Vampire: The Masquerade to them after restructuring their subsidiary and the series' former publisher White Wolf Publishing a month prior due to White Wolf's portrayal of the anti-gay purges in Chechnya in an earlier book. Modiphius Entertainment estimated that the book would be released in mid-2019, a window that was missed. When Paradox Interactive again reorganized their handling of World of Darkness in November 2020, they partnered with another publisher, Renegade Game Studios, who took over publishing duties for Second Inquisition and re-announced the book in June 2021.

Like with the previous Vampire: The Masquerade book Sabbat: The Black Hand, Second Inquisition is produced through a different development process compared to older World of Darkness books, which involves working together with diversity consultants and diversity readers to ensure that themes and topics are depicted respectfully. The book is seen by the production staff as a follow-up to both the core Vampire: The Masquerade rule book, which handles the titular organization abstractly, and to the adventure module Fall of London, which portrays their activities in London.

Second Inquisition was released by Renegade Game Studios on March 16, 2022, as a 140-page hardcover book, following several delays.
