= Dark Alliance =

Dark Alliance may refer to:

- Dark Alliance: Vancouver, a 1993 table-top role-playing game supplement book
- "Dark Alliance" series, a 1996 Mercury News newspaper investigative series by Gary Webb on the origins of the cocaine epidemic in Los Angeles
  - Dark Alliance (book), a 1998 book by Gary Webb expounding on the series
- Baldur's Gate: Dark Alliance, a 2001 video game
- Baldur's Gate: Dark Alliance II, a 2004 video game
- Dungeons & Dragons: Dark Alliance, a 2021 video game
