= Under a Blood Red Moon =

Role-playing game supplement

- Cover art by Tony Harris
- Designers: Bill Bridges; Andrew Greenberg
- Illustrators: Tony Harris, Jeff Rebner, Dan Smith, Richard Thomas, Joshua Gabriel Timbrook, Ron Spencer
- Writers: Steven C. Brown
- Publishers: White Wolf Publishing
- Publication: June 1993
- Genres: Tabletop role-playing game supplement
- Systems: Storyteller System
- Parent games: Vampire: The Masquerade; Werewolf: The Apocalypse
- Series: World of Darkness
- ISBN: 1-56504-049-X

Under a Blood Red Moon is an adventure module released in June 1993 by White Wolf Publishing for use with either of their tabletop role-playing games Vampire: The Masquerade and Werewolf: The Apocalypse, and is a part of the World of Darkness series. It is set in and around Chicago, and follows the conflict between the local vampire and werewolf communities; players take the roles of werewolves, or vampires belonging to the Camarilla or Sabbat sects.

The book was developed by Bill Bridges and Andrew Greenberg and written by Steven C. Brown, and is an early example of a cross-over between different role-playing games. It was well received by critics for its role-playing opportunities and writing, but retrospectively criticized for how the game mechanics of vampire and werewolf characters do not work perfectly together. It also performed well commercially, and like with other Werewolf: The Apocalypse books, part of the profits from sales were donated toward environmental protection.

== Overview ==
Under a Blood Red Moon is a cross-over adventure module intended to be used with the World of Darkness tabletop role-playing games Vampire: The Masquerade and Werewolf: The Apocalypse. It is set in and around Chicago, where players role-play as either vampires or werewolves in a conflict between the local vampire and werewolf communities. The book is split into chapters, each of which contains three viewpoints: werewolves, and members of two vampire sects – the Camarilla and the Sabbat, who in turn are in conflict with each other. The book also contains information for how to play the scenario as human vampire hunters or as the mummies of the book Mummy.

The story begins differently depending on what roles the players take: for werewolves, it begins with a meeting about vampire activity in Chicago; for Camarilla vampires, it begins with a werewolf attack on the Succubus Club, a vampire club in Chicago, after which the local Camarilla prince Lodin calls for a blood hunt on werewolves; and for Sabbat vampires, it begins with their sect sending an envoy to collaborate with the Black Spiral Dancers, a fallen werewolf faction. Following this, the werewolves hunt vampires and sabotage escape routes from the city to keep them trapped, while the Sabbat tries to get Camarilla vampires killed. Attacks and counter-attacks continue, including the killing of Lodin, and the outcome of the adventure is affected by the players' actions.

In addition to the scenario, the book contains information on sacred places to werewolves around Chicago for storytellers (Note: The person leading the game is called the "storyteller" in World of Darkness games, a role called "gamemaster" or "dungeon master" in other role-playing games.) to use in their campaigns, details about intrigues in Chicago, and game mechanics and rules for werewolves who have been embraced by a vampire and turned undead, referred to as "abominations".

== Production ==
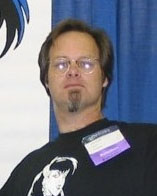
The art team for the book included interior artist Dan Smith.

Under a Blood Red Moon was developed by Bill Bridges and Andrew Greenberg, and written by Steven C. Brown, with art direction by Richard Thomas, interior art by Jeff Rebner, Dan Smith, Joshua Gabriel Timbrook, and Ron Spencer, and cover art by Tony Harris. It was designed with war as the main theme, exploring topics such as loyalty, fear, chaos, power, and death; the staff intended for players to see their characters as smaller and less important in the larger picture, while still being at great risk, and for them to question what their loyalty and lives are worth and what it means to die or kill for a cause.

It was among the first cross-overs between different role-playing games, preceded only by a few supplements such as TSR, Inc.'s Spelljammer (1989); writer Shannon Appelcline noted in his book Designers & Dragons that White Wolf Publishing was in a rare position in that all their games at the time were set in the same fictional universe, making cross-over books more feasible to produce. Despite this and how it is compatible with Vampire: The Masquerade, the production staff primarily designed it with Werewolf: The Apocalypse in mind.

The book was originally released by White Wolf Publishing in June 1993 as a 96-page softcover book. It was reprinted in unaltered form together with the second edition of the Vampire: The Masquerade setting book Chicago by Night in July–September 1996 as part of the second volume of the Chicago Chronicles line of compilations. Both the stand-alone book and the compilation have since been re-released as e-books. Like other Werewolf: The Apocalypse books, 3% of profits from sales of the book were donated toward environmental protection.

The events of the book affected later World of Darkness books, advancing the series' overarching narrative: Chicago by Night's second edition was released the same year as Under a Blood Red Moon, and updated the Chicago setting to reflect the events that occur in the module, depicting the Chicago vampire community trying to recover from the werewolf attack. Under a Blood Red Moon was followed by other cross-over books, both mechanical and thematical, which were used to introduce players of one World of Darkness game to others.

== Reception ==
Under a Blood Red Moon was well received by critics, and performed well commercially, having sold out by 1996 and prompted the Chicago Chronicles reprint. Critics enjoyed the writing, calling it interesting and high-quality; French gaming magazine Casus Belli recommended it, and wished that it would have gotten a French translation. Magia i Miecz liked the book's scenario and its dark tone, and considered it a good introduction to the World of Darkness series and its setting. Lider recommended the book, and thought that it, although not essential for a Chicago-based campaign, worked well together with the second edition of Chicago by Night, as did Dragón.

The role-playing opportunities were well received: Saga appreciated the option to play as both vampire and werewolf characters, and Magia i Miecz enjoyed getting to take the roles of werewolves and battle against vampires. Appelcline did find one major problem with the adventure's gameplay, in that Vampire: The Masquerade and Werewolf: The Apocalypse work differently on a mechanical level, and do not go perfectly well together. He thought that this was a problem with later World of Darkness books featuring mechanical cross-overs, too, and found that only thematic cross-overs in the series worked truly well.

Berin Kinsman reviewed Under a Blood Red Moon in White Wolf #38 (1993), rating it a 4 out of 5 and stated that "The big revelation here [...] is in the final appendix. The oft-pondered question of what happens to a werewolf when it's Embraced by a vampire has finally been answered. Undead Garou, called 'Abominations,' are fascinating and well thought out."
