= Rune (disambiguation) =

A rune is a letter in a set of related alphabets.

Rune or Runes may also refer to:

== People ==
- Rune (given name), a Scandinavian given name
- Holger Rune (born 2003), Danish tennis player
- Michael Rune, Danish 21st century saxophonist
- Rune Naito, pen name of Japanese artist, illustrator, writer and designer Isao Naito (1932–2007)
- Rune RK (born 1979), record producer and DJ from Denmark

== Arts and entertainment ==
=== Fictional characters ===
- Rune (comics), a Malibu Comics vampire-like villain - see List of Ultraverse characters
- Rune, in the film Jungle Emperor Leo (1997)
- Rune Haako, a Separatist in the prequel era of the Star Wars universe

=== Films ===
- Rune (film), a 2006 feature film, the first to premiere on Apple's Video iPod

=== Games ===
- Rune (role-playing game), a 2001 pen-and-paper role-playing game
- Rune (video game), a 2000 third-person action video game
- A system of customization for League of Legends (2009)
- Runite, a type of fictional metal from RuneScape (2001)

=== Music ===
- Runes, a nickname for Led Zeppelin IV, a 1971 album
- Runes (album), Bury Tomorrow's third album, released in 2014

== Other uses ==
- IF Rune, a sports club in Kungsör, Sweden
- Rune, programming jargon meaning a Unicode code point, represented as a 32-bit integer
- Valkyrie Rune, a version of Honda Gold Wing motorcycles

== See also ==
- Ruin (disambiguation)
- Rouen (disambiguation)
