= Kindred of the East =

1998 role-playing game book

- Cover art by Lawrence Snelly, depicting the Chinese character 氣 (qi)
- Designers: Robert Hatch
- Illustrators: Lawrence Snelly
- Publishers: White Wolf Publishing
- Publication: February 1998
- Systems: Storyteller System
- Parent games: Vampire: The Masquerade
- Series: World of Darkness
- Website: Official website
- ISBN: 1-56504-232-8

Kindred of the East is a tabletop role-playing game book and game line. It was released by White Wolf Publishing in February 1998 for use with their horror game Vampire: The Masquerade. It is a part of the World of Darkness series, and is the first and main entry in the Year of the Lotus line of Asia-themed books released throughout 1998.

The book covers Asia as it is portrayed in the series' setting, with a focus on China, and introduces Asian vampires called kuei-jin as player characters. These subsist on chi, and are created from humans who have done evil during their lives and return to their bodies after death. Following paths of enlightenment in the hopes of attaining a higher state of being, they participate in kuei-jin courts and oppose the demonic Yama Kings who are anticipated to rule the world in the coming sixth age.

The game was designed by Robert Hatch, with art direction by Lawrence Snelly, who took visual inspiration from manga. It was supported by a line of supplementary books which further describe kuei-jin society and paths, and was adapted into other media including a short story, comics, and a live-action role-playing game; the kuei-jin were also featured in the video game Vampire: The Masquerade – Bloodlines in 2004. Kindred of the East was generally well received by critics, who liked its gameplay, setting, mood, and artwork, but was criticized as portraying Asian people and cultures in a stereotypical way.

== Overview ==
Kindred of the East is a major rulebook and game line for the tabletop role-playing game Vampire: The Masquerade, where players take the roles of vampires. It covers Asia as it is portrayed in the setting – primarily China – and introduces Asian vampires called kuei-jin (Note: "Kuei-jin" is a term invented for Kindred of the East as a combination of the Chinese kuei (鬼, "ghost") and the Japanese jin (人; "person").) or "the hungry dead". While still undead, they differ from the vampires of Vampire: The Masquerade: they do not originate from the biblical Caine – who in the World of Darkness series is reinterpreted as the first vampire – and were instead originally created by the divine August Personage of Jade during the second age, chosen from the most virtuous humans. Their purpose was to protect humanity from the Yama Kings and their demonic followers, but during the third age, they discovered that they could not only sustain themselves through the vital essence (chi) of the world, but also through chi stolen from living beings. As punishment, the August Personage of Jade returned them to their dead bodies from their mortal lives and cut them off from the chi of the world, forcing them to survive on stolen chi.

The game is primarily set during the fifth age, in modern times, after the August Personage of Jade has turned away from the world. New kuei-jin are still created – referred to as attaining the second breath – but only from humans who have done evil and are weighed by karmic debts during their lives, and who crawl back from hell. Sometimes they return to someone else's dead body rather than their own, but a new kuei-jin does in any case begin as a zombie-like chih-mei, whose mind is clouded by a hunger for chi and who attacks mortals for it until taken in and taught to control themselves by an older kuei-jin.

Led by a storyteller, (Note: The person leading the game is called the "storyteller" in World of Darkness games, a role called "gamemaster" or "dungeon master" in other role-playing games.) players create and take the roles of newly-made kuei-jin, and role-play actions whose outcomes are in part determined through character attributes and rolling of dice. The player characters undergo training by the character who saved them from their chih-mei state, and learn about existence as a kuei-jin and their society. After this, they can be introduced to a kuei-jin court – their primary social group – and become part of a blood family (wu), which typically is made up of the players' characters. Kuei-jin follow one of several philosophical paths called dharmas, and the progression thereof is measured in levels, which affect the character's powers and their place in society; their ultimate goal is progressing through their dharma and attaining enlightenment and a higher state of being. The dharmas are based on different virtues, and a character must try to maintain the right balance between yin and yang, and between their rational mind (hun) and the evil spirit they carry within (p'o), to make progress: these include the Devil-Tiger dharma, based on p'o; Resplendent Crane, based on hun; Song of the Shadow, based on yin; Thrashing Dragon, based on yang; and Thousand Whispers, based on balance.

Kuei-jin need to absorb chi to survive, which for young kuei-jin often is done by drinking mortals' blood, whereas older kuei-jin may draw it from the environment. Absorbed chi is distilled into black and scarlet varieties, respectively linked to yin and death, and to yang and life. These can be used to fuel various supernatural powers called disciplines, such as fire-breathing, phasing through walls, or flying, which are powerful but affect the chi flow of the environment, and are thus detectable by other kuei-jin. A character's balance between black and scarlet chi will also affect their disposition and appearance. In addition to the Yama Kings and their followers, who are anticipated to rule the world in the coming sixth age, the antagonists and rivals of the game include kuei-jin following heretical dharmas, Cainite vampires, hengeyokai shapeshifters, hsien changelings, ghosts, and demon hunters.

== Production and release ==
The art direction drew inspiration from manga. Pictured: a kuei-jin of the Rising Phoenix dharma.

Kindred of the East was designed by Robert Hatch, with additional design by Phil Brucato, Jackie Cassada, Mark Cenczyk, and Nicky Rea. It was made after the publisher had kept details on Asian vampires vague since the series began with Vampire: The Masquerade in 1991, having only discussed them as the Cainite bloodlines Gaki and Bushi, which after Kindred of the East were written out of the continuity. The game was written with suggested themes including balance versus imbalance, tradition versus new ways of thinking, the group versus the individual, east versus west, hierarchy, and redemption versus damnation. The lore of Kindred of the East was initially intended to be compatible with Exalted, another of White Wolf Publishing's role-playing games, but the two ended up diverging. The art team included art director and cover artist Lawrence Snelly, logo designer Ash Arnett, calligraphy artist Andy Lee, and several interior artists, who among other sources drew inspiration from manga.

After a delay from November 1997, Kindred of the East was published by White Wolf Publishing in February 1998 as the first and main entry in their Year of the Lotus line of Asia-themed World of Darkness books, which introduced Asian supernatural beings to the games in the series, including Hengeyokai: Shapeshifters of the East for Werewolf: The Apocalypse and Land of Eight Million Dreams for Changeling: The Dreaming. Kindred of the East was based on Vampire: The Masquerade, and was published as a supplement that requires the Vampire rulebook to be played, following the model of the publisher's Mummy Second Edition from the year prior. This was done as the game could attract attention in the same way as a new, standalone game, while not being the start of a new line that would require further publisher support.

Despite this, the game did receive its own line of supplements, starting with the Kindred of the East Companion book in 1999, which updates the game to bring it in line with the rules of the 1998 Revised Edition of Vampire: The Masquerade, as well as further detailing kuei-jin society and adding new gameplay mechanics and background information. The game was also released in other languages, including Brazilian Portuguese, French, Polish, and Spanish. White Wolf Publishing eventually ended the Kindred of the East narrative in 2004 as part of the Time of Judgment event – a finale to the World of Darkness series – with adventures published in the book World of Darkness: Time of Judgment. Bruce Baugh, one of the writers on the Kindred of the East line, later said that if he had been able to write one more World of Darkness book, it may have been one expanding the Kindred of the East cosmology to make the second breath happen not only to Asian characters. In 2019, White Wolf Publishing retrospectively described Kindred of the East as written from a very Western perspective, and urged people making fan works based on it to be conscious of orientalism and essentialism.

=== Books ===
Game books for Kindred of the East
Title	Original release	ISBN	Notes
Kindred of the East	February 1998	1-56504-232-8	Core rulebook
Kindred of the East Companion	April 1999	1-56504-223-9	Book updating the game for Vampire: The Masquerade Revised Edition, and adding mechanics and lore
The 1000 Hells	May 1999	1-56504-226-3	Sourcebook for the Yomi Worlds, the home of the Yama Kings
Dharma Book: Devil-Tigers	1999	1-56504-239-5	Sourcebook for the Devil-Tiger dharma
Shadow War	1999	1-56504-227-1	Sourcebook for warfare between kuei-jin, and kuei-jin activity in California
Dharma Book: Bone Flowers	January 2000	1-56504-240-9	Sourcebook for the Bone Flower dharma
Blood & Silk	2000	1-56504-242-5	Sourcebook for the setting in 1197, just before the fifth age. Crossover with Vampire: The Dark Ages.
Half-Damned: Dhampyr	2000	1-56504-247-6	Sourcebook for dhampyrs, the children of one kuei-jin and one mortal human
Dharma Book: Thousand Whispers	January–March 2001	1-58846-200-5	Sourcebook for the Thousand Whispers dharma
Killing Streets	May 2001	1-58846-208-0	Sourcebook for organized crime and its connections to the kuei-jin courts
Dharma Book: Thrashing Dragons	September 4, 2001	1-58846-211-0	Sourcebook for the Thrashing Dragon dharma
San Francisco by Night	June 3, 2002	1-58846-231-5	Sourcebook for San Francisco. Crossover with Vampire: The Masquerade.
Heresies of the Way	September 30, 2002	1-58846-232-3	Sourcebook for heretical dharmas
Sunset Empires	December 2002	1-58846-233-1	Sourcebook for kuei-jin in the Victorian Age: Vampire setting
Dharma Book: Resplendent Cranes	2002	1-58846-221-8	Sourcebook for the Resplendent Crane dharma

== Reception ==
Reception
Review scores
Source	Rating
Backstab	8/10
Casus Belli	5/5 stars
Dosdediez	4/5 stars
Magia i Miecz	154/200 (Note: The score consists of two sub-scores: 74% for execution and 80% for content.)
Poltergeist	75%
Rollespilsmagasinet Fønix	2/5 stars

Kindred of the East and its supplements were critically well received at release: Dosdediez, Dragão Brasil, and Dragon called it among their favorite World of Darkness games; Casus Belli called it an excellent game that shows the publisher at its best; and Poltergeist recommended it to anyone who wants to play an urban-fantasy role-playing game set in Asia. Retrospectively, Backstab compared it favorably to Kindred of the Ebony Kingdom, a 2003 Vampire: The Masquerade supplement about African vampires.

Critics generally liked the gameplay mechanics, with Backstab much preferring them to those of Vampire: The Masquerade, although conceding that they were a bit complicated to use; Magia i Miecz thought that the game may require some modifications to simplify the rules. Dosdediez liked the chi mechanics for adding a unique flavor and opening up possibilities, while Poltergeist considered the risk of using p'o disciplines so unbalanced that they never feel worth using, the dharmas' descriptions too brief to role-play as characters following them, and the p'o archetypes often indistinctive. Sci-Fi Universe liked the game for standing out from Vampire: The Masquerade, finding it to facilitate many new story ideas and role-play opportunities related to intrigue and politics. Casus Belli, Dragon, and SF Site criticized the game for requiring one to learn a lot of terminology and concepts before playing, although the latter thought this was partially mitigated by Kindred of the East Companion.

The game's mystical setting and writing were well received for their mood and atmosphere, (Note: See Backstab, Dragão Brasil, Rollespilsmagasinet Fønix, and SF Site) and for feeling fresh compared to previous World of Darkness games, although Dragão Brasil did not find it dark enough for the series. Rollespilsmagasinet Fønix, while calling the setting coherent and interesting, thought it deviates far too much from what had been established in previous World of Darkness games, whereas Backstab thought it was a better game for the differences. The player characters were mostly well received at release: Dosdediez preferred them to the Cainite vampires of Vampire: The Masquerade for having higher aspirations, while Dragão Brasil considered them potentially too different, although making for interesting allies or antagonists in cross-over play with other World of Darkness games. Casus Belli agreed, and appreciated the kuei-jin's similarities to the wraiths of Wraith: The Oblivion, making the game feel simultaneously new and familiar.

Critics generally liked the game's artwork and presentation, (Note: See Casus Belli, Dosdediez, Dragão Brasil, and Magia i Miecz) with Casus Belli calling it a beautiful and well-designed book, and Dosdediez calling it visually above average for the publisher. The layout, lettering, and printing were also generally well received, although Poltergeist criticized its use of black text on dark backgrounds, making reading at times tiring. The illustrations were well received and considered to match the standards set by previous World of Darkness games, and were described by Dragão Brasil as "exceptional"; Poltergeist also liked the cover art for making the game stand out.

The portrayal of Asia and Asian people in the game saw mixed responses. Sci-Fi Universe and SF Site called the game well researched and fascinating, the latter finding it a good platform for exploring Asian cultures and themes of Westernization, while Casus Belli found the descriptions of Asia lacking, and Poltergeist found it absurd to even attempt to describe China and major religions in only a few pages. Dosdediez thought it was nice to finally see coverage of Asia in World of Darkness, but found its use of stereotypes excessive, saying that if a White Wolf Publishing book set in Spain does not feature an entire cast of bullfighters, it makes little sense that meditative and spiritual martial artists would be so prevalent in Kindred of the East. Poltergeist similarly criticized the portrayal of Asian characters as excessively xenophobic, and TheGamer, describing the kuei-jin as stereotypical, wrote in 2019 that unless they were reworked, they did not expect the kuei-jin to return to the series.

=== Sales ===
Kindred of the East debuted as the fourth highest-selling tabletop role-playing game in France during the January–February 1998 period, and peaked at number 2 behind Deadlands in March–April 1998, before falling off the top 10 chart by July–August 1998. In Spain, it debuted as the fourth highest-selling new tabletop role-playing game in the December 1999–January 2000 period, and remained on the top 30 chart for an entire year.

== Related media ==
Laws of the East, a Kindred of the East adaptation for the live-action role-playing game Mind's Eye Theatre, was developed by Cynthia Summers and written by Peter Woodworth, and released in 2000. In 1998, video game publisher Activision acquired the rights to develop video games based on Kindred of the East, along with Vampire: The Masquerade and Vampire: The Dark Ages. The kuei-jin were eventually featured in the 2004 video game Vampire: The Masquerade – Bloodlines, where Ming Xiao, a kuei-jin woman controlling Los Angeles's Chinatown, is one of the antagonists. Kuei-jin are also featured in the Vampire: The Masquerade tabletop game book Nights of Prophecy (2000), and events involving them are hinted at in Beckett's Jyhad Diary (2018). As of Vampire: The Masquerade's fifth edition (2018), they are no longer officially part of the series' setting.

Manga-inspired comics based on the game were published as part of several of the books in the game line. Kevin Andrew Murphy's Kindred of the East short story "The Lotus of Five Petals" was published in 1998 as part of the fiction anthology The Quintessential World of Darkness, which was edited by Anna Branscome and Stewart Wieck.
