= Clanbook: Assamite =

Role-playing game supplement

Clanbook: Assamite is a 1995 role-playing game supplement published by White Wolf Publishing for Vampire: The Masquerade.

== Contents ==
Clanbook: Assamite is a supplement in which the Assamite clan's history is explored, along with signature powers, and ready‑to‑use character templates for players and storytellers.

== Reviews ==
- Świat Gier Komputerowych (Nov 1999)
- Backstab #27
- Valkyrie
- Dragão Brasil #42 (Sep 1998) p. 4
- Envoyer #10 (Aug 1997)
- Envoyer #51 (Jan 2001)
- Magia i Miecz #1999-10 p. 36
- Dosdediez V2 #13 (Apr 2000) p. 20
- Dosdediez V2 #24 (Jun 2003) p. 17
- RPG Magazine #6 (May 2003) p. 4
- D20 #1 p. 12-13
