= The Players Guide to the Sabbat =

- Publisher: White Wolf Publishing
- Publication date: 1992
- ISBN: 1-56504-042-2

The Players Guide to the Sabbat is a 1992 role-playing supplement for Vampire: The Masquerade published by White Wolf Publishing.

== Contents ==
The Players Guide to the Sabbat is a supplement in which the inhuman Sabbat and their preference for the Beast within are detailed. The sourcebook was the first to detail the Paths of Enlightenment used by the Sabbat instead of Humanity, and the alternate Virtues underpinning their morality.

The book describes two new clans, the Lasombra and Tzimisce, as well as the antitribu or "anti-clan" counterparts of the common Camarilla and Independent clans. The latter are those vampires who have turned their backs on their parent clans to join the Sabbat and oppose the Antediluvians. The book also features three new Disciplines, and new paths of Thaumaturgy, Merits and Flaws.

== Reception ==
Berin Kinsman reviewed The Player's Guide to the Sabbat in White Wolf #37 (July/Aug., 1993), rating it a 3 out of 5 and stated that "This is a must-have, not just for Storyteller System players, but any horror-genre fans who want detailed, truly nasty vampires in their games." According to reviewer Don Bassingthwaite, The Players Guide to the Sabbat and its follow-up, The Storyteller's Handbook to the Sabbat, "allowed players to taste the forbidden fruits of Sabbat unlife and brought some of the first deep mysteries of the World of Darkness into the game". Deird'Re Brooks describes the book as "one of the better products to see the (ahem) light of day".

== Reviews ==
- Australian Realms #10
- The Last Province (Issue 3 - 1993)
- Backstab #11 (Sep-Oct 1998) p. 50
- Casus Belli V1 #75 (May-Jun 1993) p. 26
- Casus Belli V1 #93 (Apr 1996) p. 36-38
- Casus Belli V1 #115 (Aug-Sep 1998) p. 26
- Dragão Brasil #33 (Dec 1997) p. 2
- Dragão Brasil #35 (Feb 1998) p. 5
- Dragão Brasil #36 (Mar 1998) p. 56-58
- Envoyer #28 (Feb 1999)
- Magia i Miecz #1999-05 p. 7
- Świat Gier Komputerowych #5/1999 p. 92-93
- Dosdediez #8 (Jul 1996) p. 25
- Dosdediez V2 #13 (Apr 2000) p. 18
- Lider 52 (Mar 1996) p. 16
