= Clanbook: Nosferatu =

Game supplement

Clanbook: Nosferatu is a 1993 role-playing game supplement published by White Wolf Publishing for Vampire: The Masquerade.

== Contents ==
Clanbook: Nosferatu is a supplement in which the clan's hidden history and its subterranean kingdoms beneath every city are detailed, and ten ready‑to‑use character templates are included for players and storytellers.

== Reviews ==
- Rue Morgue #16
- Envoyer
- Dragon (German Issue 13 - Mar/Apr 2001)
- Valkyrie
- Player.it
- Envoyer #43 (May 2000)
- Masters of Role Playing (Matt Fitt)
- Casus Belli V2 #5 (Dec 2000) p. 61
- Magia i Miecz #2000-06 p. 18
- Dosdediez #3 (Mar-Apr 1994) p. 23
- Dosdediez V2 #16 Nov 2000) p. 21
- Dosdediez V2 #20 (Apr 2002) p. 19
- Dosdediez V2 #22 (Jan 2003) p. 18
