= The Hunters Hunted =

The Hunters Hunted is a 1992 role-playing supplement for Vampire: The Masquerade published by White Wolf Publishing.

== Contents ==
The Hunters Hunted is a supplement in which rules are provided to create vampire hunter characters.

== Publication history ==
Shannon Appelcline noted that "White Wolf began to push crossovers much harder in 1995, with 'The Year of the Hunter'. Expanding upon the idea of Vampire's The Hunters Hunted (1992), White Wolf produced five sourcebooks, one for each of their games. Each detailed the background for a group hunting the game's title characters. It was a clever way to encourage collectors to look at all of White Wolf's lines and to encourage cross-fertilization from one game to another."

== Reception ==
Steve Crow reviewed The Hunters Hunted in White Wolf #33 (Sept./Oct., 1992), rating it a 3 out of 5 and stated that "Overall, Hunters is a good buy for fleshing out your Vampire campaign, or creating a new hunters-oriented campaign."

== Reviews ==
- Casus Belli V1 #73 (Jan-Feb 1993) p. 23
- Casus Belli V1 #93 (Apr 1996) p. 36-38
- Dragão Brasil #28 (Jul 1997) p. 56-57 (as "Os Caçadores Caçado")
- Dragão Brasil #30 (Sep 1997) p. 5
- Saga #16 (Sep 1992) p. 20
- Saga #15 (Aug 1992) p. 4-5
- Magia i Miecz #1999-12 p. 15
- Dosdediez V2 #14 (Jun 2000) p. 20
- Lider #46 (Mar 1995) p. 12
- Dragón (Spain) #18 (Mar-Apr 1995) p. 63
