= Ashes to Ashes (Vampire: The Masquerade) =

Tabletop role-playing game supplement

- Cover art
- Writers: Stewart Wieck
- Publishers: White Wolf Publishing
- Publication: Q3 1991
- Genres: Tabletop role-playing game supplement
- Systems: Storyteller System
- Parent games: Vampire: The Masquerade
- Series: World of Darkness
- ISBN: 0-9627-790-7-5 (Note: Misprinted as 0-96627-790-7-5)

Ashes to Ashes is an adventure module published in Q3 1991 by White Wolf Publishing for use with their tabletop role-playing game Vampire: The Masquerade.

== Plot summary ==
Ashes to Ashes is an adventure module connecting to the story included in the first edition of the game's corebook. The vampire prince of their city orders the player characters to appear before Lodin, the Prince of Chicago, and but before they can find him they become involved in deadly vampire intrigue between two competing groups.

== Publication history ==
Ashes to Ashes was the first adventure module published by White Wolf Publishing for Vampire: The Masquerade, released in Q3 1991. The 80-page adventure was written by Stewart Wieck. In 1996, it was re-released as part of the compilation Chicago Chronicles Volume 3, together with the supplements Milwaukee by Night and Blood Bond. A French edition of the adventure was published by Hexagonal in January 1993.

== Reception ==
Reception
Review scores
Source	Rating
Arcane	8/10

Dragon's Rick Swan called this "an excellent first adventure for the quirky Vampire game." Swan thought the adventure "packed a lot of punch into 80 pages", but found that "the investigations are more successfully staged than the action scenes, and the finale is a bit underwhelming." Nonetheless, he recommended the product, saying that the author had served up "a gallery of the creepiest non-player characters this side of Chaosium's Call of Cthulhu." Saga thought it was a good introductory story, and appreciated how it helps introduce players to the vampire community in Chicago.

Looking back on it in 1997, Backstab called Ashes to Ashes one of the three most essential Vampire: The Masquerade supplements, along with The Players Guide and Chicago by Night, and Dragon called it the best of the early Vampire: The Masquerade material. Casus Belli thought it would be particularly useful together with the books Chicago by Night and The Succubus Club.
