= Storytellers Handbook to the Sabbat =

Storytellers Handbook to the Sabbat is a 1993 role-playing game supplement published by White Wolf Publishing for Vampire: The Masquerade.

== Contents ==
Storytellers Handbook to the Sabbat is a supplement in which gamemasters are provided with guidance for Sabbat campaigns, offering chronicles, sample stories, new bloodlines, details on ghoul families, and an in‑depth exploration of the sect's Infernal corruption through the Path of Evil Revelations.

== Reviews ==
- Casus Belli #117
- Backstab #12 (as "Le Sabbat - Manuel du conteur")
- Casus Belli V1 #93 (Apr 1996) p. 36–38
- Magia i Miecz #1999-05 p. 7
