= World of Darkness: Mummy =

World of Darkness: Mummy is a 1992 role-playing supplement for Vampire: The Masquerade published by White Wolf Publishing.

== Contents ==
World of Darkness: Mummy is a supplement in which the mummy is presented as a potential opponent or ally for vampire characters.

== Publication history ==
Shannon Appelcline noted that after White Wolf "used a new model that they had played with when they put out Mummy Second Edition (1997) [...] As a single major rulebook - but one that required another World of Darkness rulebook to play".

== Reception ==
Steve Crow reviewed Mummy in White Wolf #34 (Jan./Feb., 1993), rating it a 3 out of 5 and stated that "Overall, Mummy is a good buy for fleshing out your Vampire campaign, and Werewolf as well. It should also prove useful for gamemasters of future White Wolf games such as Mage and Ghost."

Adam Tinworth reviewed Mummy Second Edition for Arcane magazine, rating it a 7 out of 10 overall, and stated that "There is potential for a very interesting game here. But the limited space it's been given means that a lot of work will have to go into making the most of it."

== Reviews ==
- The Last Province (Issue 1 - Oct 1992)
- Casus Belli (Issue 72 - Nov 1992)
- Casus Belli V1 #93 (Apr 1996) pp. 36–38
- Saga #16 (Sep 1992) p. 20
- Chroniques d'Outre-Monde #28 pp. 14–15
- Backstab #2 (Mar-Apr 1997) p. 54
- Casus Belli V1 #101 (Jan 1997) p. 14
- Dragão Brasil #27 (Jun 1997) p. 7
- Dragão Brasil #31 (Oct 1997) pp. 42–47
- Magia i Miecz #1998-07/08 p. 6
- Świat Gier Komputerowych #1998/7 pp. 90–91
- Dosdediez V2 #7 (Dec 1998) p. 17
- Shadis #32 p. 80
