= Dirty Secrets of the Black Hand =

Supplement for horror role-playing game

- Cover art by Ken Meyer Jr.
- Designers: Steven C. Brown
- Illustrators: Dave Allsop; Stuart P. Beel; Jason Felix; David Ferber; Leif Jones; Nikolai Ruskin; Joshua Gabriel Timbrook
- Publishers: White Wolf Publishing
- Publication: 1994
- Genres: Horror RPG

Dirty Secrets of the Black Hand is a supplement published by White Wolf Publishing in 1994 for the modern-day horror role-playing game Vampire: The Masquerade that explores the bloody practices and history of an ancient Sabbat subsect.

== Contents ==
Dirty Secrets of the Black Hand explores the Sabbat subsect known as the Black Hand, and its history and goals. It introduces the Tal'mahe'Ra, an ancient cult at the center of the Black Hand, and its attempts to subvert the Black Hand for its own purposes, as well as its influence among the Camarilla, Inconnu and independents.

The book is divided into chapters:

1. "You Are One of Us Now": Explains the facade and reality of the subcult.
2. "Unlife Within the Black Hand": The cult's ideology.
3. "The Blood of Our Own": The clans and bloodlines of the cult.
4. "Building Better Bastards": Generating characters that belong to the cult. Also included are descriptions of new new spells and powers.
5. "Enoch, The City Caine Built ": The citadel that acts as the cult's headquarters.
6. "Templates": Ten character archetypes, including spies, conspirators, and assassins.

The book also includes two appendices:

- "Those You Should Fear ": Ten notable non-player characters.
- "The Hidden Agenda": Creatures of the cult.

== Publication history ==
White Wolf Publishing released the horror role-playing game Vampire: The Masquerade (V:TM) in 1991. It proved popular, and White Wolf followed up with many supplements. One of these was 1994's Dirty Secrets of the Black Hand, a 128-page softcover book created by Steven C. Brown, with cover art by Ken Meyer Jr., and interior art by Dave Allsop, Stuart P. Beel, Jason Felix, David Ferber, Leif Jones, Nikolai Ruskin, and Joshua Gabriel Timbrook.

This supplement stirred considerable controversy upon its release due to its revelations of strange, previously unseen bloodlines. In the second edition of V:TM, it was subsequently revised as a chapter in The Storyteller's Handbook. In the Revised Edition of V:TM, material about the Black Hand appeared in the supplement Caine's Chosen: The Black Hand.

== Reception ==
In Issue 223 of Dragon, Rick Swan commented, "Grisly and humorless, Black Hand is the role-playing equivalent of a splatter movie — hard-core players should take that as a recommendation."

Stu Horvath, writing for Vintage RPG, suggested the book was an attempt to create opportunities to play in games that mixed different supernatural creatures (such as vampires, werewolves and mages), but the result was incoherent.

In Issue 93 of the French game magazine Casus Belli, Fabrice Colin and Tristan Lhomme commented, "This supplement contains a number of unexpected revelations that may well shatter the players' perception of the World of Darkness." They warned that it was "Intended for the most experienced players."

In Issue 47 of the French game magazine Backstab, Cyril Pasteau commented, "Though sometimes dismissed as 'munchkin' nonsense, Dirty Secrets remains popular because it provides answers, unafraid to cite specific facts, dates, and names." Pasteau concluded, "the sect lurking behind it all serves as a reminder of a fundamental rule in Vampire: the manipulators themselves are being manipulated."

== Other reviews and commentary ==
- Magia i Miecz #2000-02 p. 17 (in Polish)
- Magia i Miecz #1999-05 p. 7 (in Polish)
- Dosdediez V2 #10 (Jul 1999) p. 16 (in Spanish)
