= The Storytellers Handbook =

- Publisher: White Wolf Publishing
- Publication date: 1992
- ISBN: 1-56504-024-4

The Storytellers Handbook is a 1992 role-playing supplement for Vampire: The Masquerade published by White Wolf Publishing.

== Contents ==
The Storytellers Handbook is a supplement in which Storytellers are given information on how to set up and run a campaign.

== Reception ==
Steve Crow reviewed The Storytellers Handbook in White Wolf #34 (Jan./Feb. 1993), rating it a 4 out of 5 and stated that "Gamemasters for other systems might not find a lot of value, as most of the material relates to the specific setting of Vampire. The advice on storytelling is useful to anyone."

== Reviews ==
- The Last Province (Issue 1 - Oct 1992)
- Casus Belli (Issue 72 - Nov 1992)
- Casus Belli V1 #93 (Apr 1996) p. 36-38
- Valkyrie
- Magia i Miecz #2000-02 p. 17
- Dosdediez V2 #13 (Apr 2000) p. 21
- Lider 56 (Nov 1996) p. 14
- Chroniques d'Outre-Monde #28 p. 15
