= Clanbook: Gangrel =

1993 role-playing game supplement

Cover art by Timothy Bradstreet and Grant Goleash

Clanbook: Gangrel is a supplement published by White Wolf Publishing in 1993 for the horror role-playing game Vampire: The Masquerade that describes player characters that belong to the clan known as Gangrels.

== Contents ==
In the World of Darkness setting, gangerels are vampires who live solitary lives in the wild, only occasionally gathering together for evenings of storytelling. Clanbook: Gangrel is a supplement that provides information about how to create and play a gangrel character. Ten sample characters take up about half of the book. The book also contains stories about the clan, their friendship with werewolves — unusual for vampires in the World of Darkness setting — and the clan's connection with gypsies.

A Revised Edition published in 2000 includes a history of the clan, how the clan left the Camarilla during the split that happened in the third edition of Vampire: The Masquerade, and descriptions of several prominent members of the clan.

== Publication history ==
In 1991, White Wolf released the horror role-playing game Vampire: The Masquerade, which proved to be very popular. In January 1993, White Wolf published the second edition of Vampire: The Masquerade, as well as a series of "clanbooks" that detailed the various lifestyles and personalities of vampires belonging to each of the thirteen clans. The second of these was Clanbook: Gangrel, a 72-page softcover book written by Brad Freeman, with cover art by Timothy Bradstreet and Grant Goleash, and interior art by John Bridges and Joshua Timbrook. (Although White Wolf published their English-language supplements in alphabetical order, when they released Portuguese translations in Brazil, the first clanbook was Gangrel rather than Brujah, which had run into production issues.)

In 1998, White Wolf published the Revised Edition of Vampire: The Masquerade, and re-issued updated editions of all the clanbooks. This included a new edition of Clanbook: Gangrel, now a 104-page softcover book designed by James and Ellen Kiley, with new cover art by John Van Fleet and interior art by Mike Danza, Richard Kane Ferguson, Michael Gaydos, Leif Jones, and Christopher Shy.

== Reception ==
Berin Kinsman reviewed Clanbook: Gangrel in White Wolf #38 (1993), rating it a 5 out of 5 and stated that "My only major disappointment was the complete lack of information on the Gangrel antitribu. There's not so much as a mention of the antitribu anywhere in the book, which is a shame, as the clan's counterparts were one of the highest points of the Player's Guide to the Sabbat.."

In Issue 6 of the French games magazine Backstab, Christophe Jouane reviewed the French-language version and pointed out "The Gangrel clan is no longer one of the players' favorites. It's not easy to play a seemingly solitary vampire who prefers to roam the woods rather than get involved in city politics." Jouane suggested the way to change this would be to provide a supplement that would "provide cultural references, models of behavior, in short, material to enrich the character." However, Jouane found Clanbook: Gangrel fell short of this objective. "The presentation in the form of dialogues (which is, moreover, poorly written) does not tell us much." Jouane concluded by giving this book a poor rating of only 3 out of 10.

The German games magazine Envoyer liked the ten sample characters, but found that "after reading the book, you don't get the feeling that you have really gotten to know the 'numerous secrets' of the 'mysterious clan' (as it is announced on the cover)." Another area of concern was the poor copyediting, with as many as three spelling errors on each page.

== Other reviews and commentary ==
- Valkyrie
- Player.it
- Magia i Miecz #1999-10 (in Polish) p. 35
- Dosdediez #8 (Jul 1996, in Spanish) p. 16
- Dosdediez V2 #18 (Jun 2001, in Spanish) p. 19
- Roleplayer Independent (Volume 1, Issue 6 - May 1993)
