= Nights of Prophecy =

Nights of Prophecy is a 2000 role-playing game adventure published by White Wolf Publishing for Vampire: The Masquerade.

== Plot summary ==
Nights of Prophecy is an adventure in which major upheavals across the world—Baba Yaga's fall, Sabbat losses, Kuei‑jin conquests, the Assamite schism, and more—are told through five linked adventures that place player characters at the center of the events leading toward Gehenna.

== Reviews ==
- Backstab #21
- Realms of Fantasy
- Envoyer #43 (May 2000)
- Magia i Miecz #2000-05 p. 18-19
- DXP #2 (Apr 2000) p. 5
- Dosdediez V2 #15 (Aug 2000) p. 21
- Dosdediez V2 #19 (Feb 2002) p. 20
- D20 #3 p. 16-17
