= Chicago by Night =

Role-playing game supplement

- First edition cover art by Clark Mitchell
- Designers: Andrew Greenberg (ed. 1–2); Mark Rein-Hagen (ed. 1); Matthew Dawkins (ed. 3)
- Publishers: White Wolf Publishing (ed. 1–2); Onyx Path Publishing (ed. 3)
- Publication: 1991 (ed. 1); July 1993 (ed. 2); February 19, 2020 (ed. 3)
- Genres: Tabletop role-playing game supplement
- Parent games: Vampire: The Masquerade
- Series: World of Darkness
- Website: Official website
- ISBN: 1-56504-000-7 (ed. 1): 1-56504-051-1 (ed. 2); 978-1-950082-42-1 (ed. 3)

Chicago by Night is a tabletop role-playing game supplement originally released by White Wolf Publishing in 1991 for use with the first edition of their game Vampire: The Masquerade, and released in updated versions for the game's second and fifth editions in 1993 and 2020. As a sandbox-style setting sourcebook for storytellers (Note: The person leading the game is called the "storyteller" in World of Darkness games, a role called "gamemaster" or "dungeon master" in other role-playing games.) to use in campaigns, Chicago by Night describes the city of Chicago as it is portrayed within the game's setting, reinterpreted as having a large population of vampires.

The supplement was originally developed by Andrew Greenberg and Mark Rein-Hagen; Greenberg returned to develop the second edition, and Matthew Dawkins developed the third, which was released by Onyx Path Publishing. Chicago by Night was well received by players and critics, who considered it among the best Vampire: The Masquerade books, and among the best role-playing game settings. Its style and format were influential on later role-playing games and supplements, and it was followed by a series of By Night books for other cities.

== Overview ==
Chicago by Night is a setting sourcebook for the tabletop role-playing game Vampire: The Masquerade, where players take the roles of vampires. The book describes Chicago and gives storytellers information to build a campaign set there, with its history and geography reinterpreted for the setting as one of the cities with the largest populations of vampires, and home to some of the most powerful. The vampires and other supernatural beings inhabiting Chicago, and the relationships between them, are detailed as non-player characters for storytellers to use in their campaigns, along with descriptions of the local vampire politics and hierarchies; characters include recurring ones from the story "Forged in Steel" in the Vampire: The Masquerade first-edition rulebook and from the adventure module Ashes to Ashes. Chicago by Night has a sandbox-style design, with encounters, intrigues, local urban legends and story hooks for storytellers to use. Characters from the Vampire mythos are woven into real-life Chicago, including their involvement with landmarks such as Meigs Field, the Biograph Theater, and the UIC campus, as well as how the Kindred have influenced the history of the city and its geography.

The setting is updated between editions to account for the passage of time and for events that have occurred in the overarching narrative in Vampire: The Masquerade: for example, the character Lodin is killed in a werewolf attack on the Chicago vampire community in the 1993 book Under a Blood Red Moon, which is reflected in the second edition of Chicago by Night, which depicts the local vampire community trying to recover. The third edition advances the setting further to account for the time that has passed since the previous editions, and covers the vampire clan Lasombra's entry into the Camarilla sect in the Vampire: The Masquerade continuity. It also adds Lasombra vampires as playable characters to Vampire: The Masquerade's fifth edition (abbreviated V5), with rules for their game mechanics, including their Oblivion discipline.

== Production ==
=== First and second editions ===
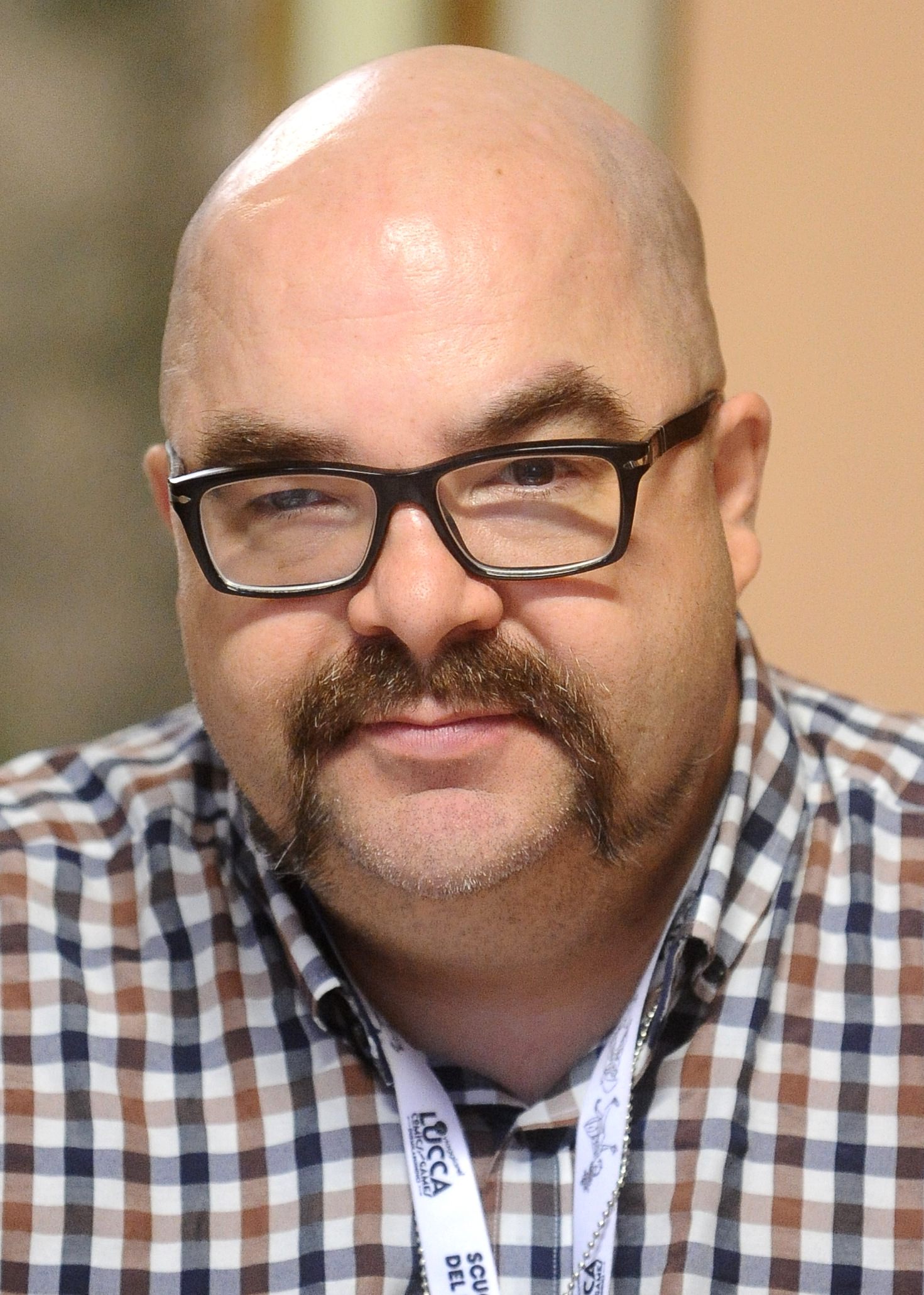
Mark Rein-Hagen (pictured, 2015) and Andrew Greenberg developed the first edition.

The first edition of Chicago by Night was developed by Mark Rein-Hagen, the designer of Vampire: The Masquerade, and Andrew Greenberg, the Vampire: The Masquerade line developer at the time. Rein-Hagen also wrote the introduction for the supplement; Greenberg wrote the history chapter, and co-wrote the chapter on the characters with Stewart Wieck, and the chapter on encounters with Josh Timbrook, Travis Lamar Williams, and Chris McDonough. The geography chapter was written by Steve Crow, with maps by McDonough, Rob Dixon, and Margaux Schaffer; other artists include Tim Bradstreet, Josh Timbrook, Richard Thomas, Ron Spencer, and Craig Cartwright, and cover artist Clark Mitchell. Crow describes the cover art by an uncredited Mitchell as "a 'Watchman'-like shot [...] of a vampire plunging to his death from a skyscraper window." Several of the vampire characters appearing in the first edition were based on characters from Upton Sinclair's novel The Jungle (1906).

Greenberg returned as developer and writer for the second edition, Crow again handled the geography, and McDonough, Dixon and Schaffer returned to make the maps. They were joined by René Lilly, who worked as a consultant for the Chicago setting. The art team again included Thomas, who this time served as art director, and Bradstreet and Timbrook, but also Steve Casper, Jesper Myrfors, and Robert McNeil; the cover art was created by Doug Gregory.

=== Third edition ===
Tomas Arfert's cover segues into the third edition's take on the V5 visual format.

The third edition was developed by Matthew Dawkins, with art direction by Mike Chaney, and was Onyx Path Publishing's third time pitching a Chicago by Night book: they had previously pitched one for the 20th Anniversary Edition of Vampire: The Masquerade, and one for the canceled Onyx Path Publishing-made Vampire: The Masquerade 4th Edition. Dawkins aimed to make the book a useful tool, and, taking influence from the book's first edition, included a section dedicated to story hooks, something that Onyx Path Publishing would continue with the V5 books they produced after that; Dawkins liked how it made it possible to start playing more quickly. He also aimed to create a book that evoked particulars of Chicago, reflecting its diverse range of culture, politics, people, and not just make a generic By Night book. At the same time, a goal was to create a book that was universal and could be used by storytellers to construct other city settings for their own Vampire: The Masquerade campaigns. The book was also written to be a good context for clan Lasombra's introduction in V5.

The characters contributed in large part to the book's length, nearly doubling it from its originally planned 100,000 words: this was in part as the staff felt a need to portray more characters from each vampire clan in a setting as large as Chicago, and in part because V5 focuses more on vampires' former mortal lives than previous Vampire: The Masquerade editions, necessitating expansion of each vampire character's biography. The character Kevin Jackson was written with the character Stringer Bell from the television series The Wire (2002–2008) as an inspiration; Dawkins felt that Jackson's portrayal in the previous editions was stereotypical – a Black man with ties to criminal gang activity – and that he needed more depth. As such, he was turned into more of a white-collar criminal, based on the archetype of "a politician who donates to the right charities".

Klara Horskjær Herbøl, one of the writers on the book, took inspiration from Grigori Rasputin for the Lasombra vampire Aleksandr Malenkov, portraying him as a charismatic but "filthy" and unlikable person. She also wrote him as a counterpoint to Sierra Van Burrace, another Lasombra vampire, having Malenkov represent the argument for why Lasombra should not join the Camarilla, while Sierra represents why they should. Eddy Webb, another writer, wrote the Lasombra character Michalis Basaras as a rabbi: the clan had often been portrayed as linked to faith in previous Vampire: The Masquerade books, but almost always Catholicism, and so he wanted to portray it as more spiritually diverse.

The book was produced to match the visual format of previous V5 books, something new for Onyx Path Publishing, who did not have a photography or costuming department; they ended up using illustrations, with a modified photograph as the cover art used as a segue into their take on the visual format, created by the art director Tomas Arfert at series owner Paradox Interactive. Arfert also gave Onyx Path Publishing advice on the interior art, to make it fit into the format.

== Release ==
Chicago by Night was originally published by White Wolf Publishing in 1991 for Vampire: The Masquerade's first edition, as a 192-page hardcover book; they released a second edition of the supplement, for the second edition of Vampire: The Masquerade, in July 1993, as a 200-page softcover. The Succubus Club, a supplement whose scenarios are largely connected to Chicago by Night, followed the first edition in 1991. The first two Chicago by Night editions were reprinted in unaltered form from their original releases in 1996 as part of the Chicago Chronicles line of Vampire: The Masquerade compilations: the first edition was re-released together with The Succubus Club in volume 1, and the second edition together with Under a Blood Red Moon in volume 2. The first and second editions have since been released as e-books, as have the Chicago Chronicles compilations. The first edition was released in French by Hexagonal in September 1993 and in Italian by Das Production in 1994, and the second edition was released in Spanish by La Factoria de Ideas in 1996.

The third edition of Chicago by Night was announced at the gaming convention Gen Con in August 2018, as Onyx Path Publishing's first V5 book. Its production, and a print run of it for retail stores, was financed through a crowdfunding campaign on Kickstarter, which reached its goal of US$40,000 within 24 hours; by the end of the campaign, on November 29, 2018, it had raised over $119,000. The book was released by Onyx Path Publishing as a full-color, hardcover book on February 19, 2020, and was also released as an e-book and in a print-on-demand version. The third edition was released in Italian by Need Games on April 3, 2020, at the Modena Play 2020 trade show, and is planned to be released in French by Arkhane Asylum Publishing in 2022.

White Wolf Publishing followed Chicago by Night with a series of By Night setting sourcebooks describing various cities, such as Milwaukee by Night (1992) and Los Angeles by Night (1994). The third edition of Chicago by Night was followed by the book The Chicago Folios, which was released by Onyx Path Publishing on April 1, 2020, and contains mysteries, story hooks, character biographies, and blood sorcery rituals.

== Reception ==
Reception
Review scores
Source	Rating
Arcane	9/10 (ed. 1)
Dosdediez	(ed. 2)
Dragon	(ed. 1)

Chicago by Night is the most popular setting book for Vampire: The Masquerade, and was described by Tom's Hardware as a beloved and historical sourcebook; Arcane called it a classic, and among the best and most complete settings for any role-playing game system, recommending it "unreservedly". In 1996, Casus Belli called the first and second editions the best books in the By Night series, in 1997, Backstab called Chicago by Night one of the three most essential Vampire: The Masquerade supplements, along with The Players Guide and Ashes to Ashes; and in 1998, Backstab called it the standard that other Vampire: The Masquerade books should be compared to. By 1999, Casus Belli still considered Chicago by Night the most important Vampire: The Masquerade supplement, and recommended new players to begin with it. In 2000, Dosdediez called it a "must-have", considering it an exemplary book reminding one of the flavor of early Vampire: The Masquerade books. ICv2 and Tom's Hardware considered it an iconic and influential sourcebook, that established a format, style and look that later supplements and role-playing games followed.

Arcane found the cast of characters strong, and enjoyed how their complex relations together with the political intrigue opened possibilities for stories to tell and mysteries for players to explore; they wished that the Chicago Chronicles reprint would have corrected the errors in it and updated it for Vampire: The Masquerade's second edition, considering the supplement otherwise "perfect". Saga called it a "brilliant" book, finding its cast, setting and encounters intriguing. The Games Machine found the first edition "very interesting"; Computer + Videogiochi called it a masterful work that continues to surprise, with well crafted stories and situations in a detailed setting. Casus Belli called it a model work, praising the detail of the characters, plots, and maps, and particularly recommended it to French players due to how most Vampire: The Masquerade materials published in French at the time were set around the Chicago region; they thought it would be particularly useful together with the supplements The Succubus Club and Ashes to Ashes. They liked the second edition as well, and wished that it, too, would have received a French translation. Dragon was more critical, considering the first edition's visuals to look "borderline amateur" in retrospect, compared to later supplements like Constantinople by Night (1996), but still found the writing highly imaginative. They also thought that the second edition was slightly "bloated". Lider liked the second edition, appreciating its characters and descriptions of the geography and the vampire history, and thought that it worked particularly well together with Under a Blood Red Moon, and Dragón thought the scenario it presents of a power vacuum left behind after Lodin's death was interesting.

Nerdist considered the third edition brilliantly written, and thought that its writing and amount of content made it "no wonder" that the crowdfunding campaign was as successful as it was. Casus Belli called it "beautiful", and liked its cast of characters and amount of story hooks. By mid-December 2020, the third edition was the highest selling horror role-playing game book of the year on DriveThruRPG, one of the largest online stores for tabletop role-playing games.
