= Heroscape =

Miniature wargaming system

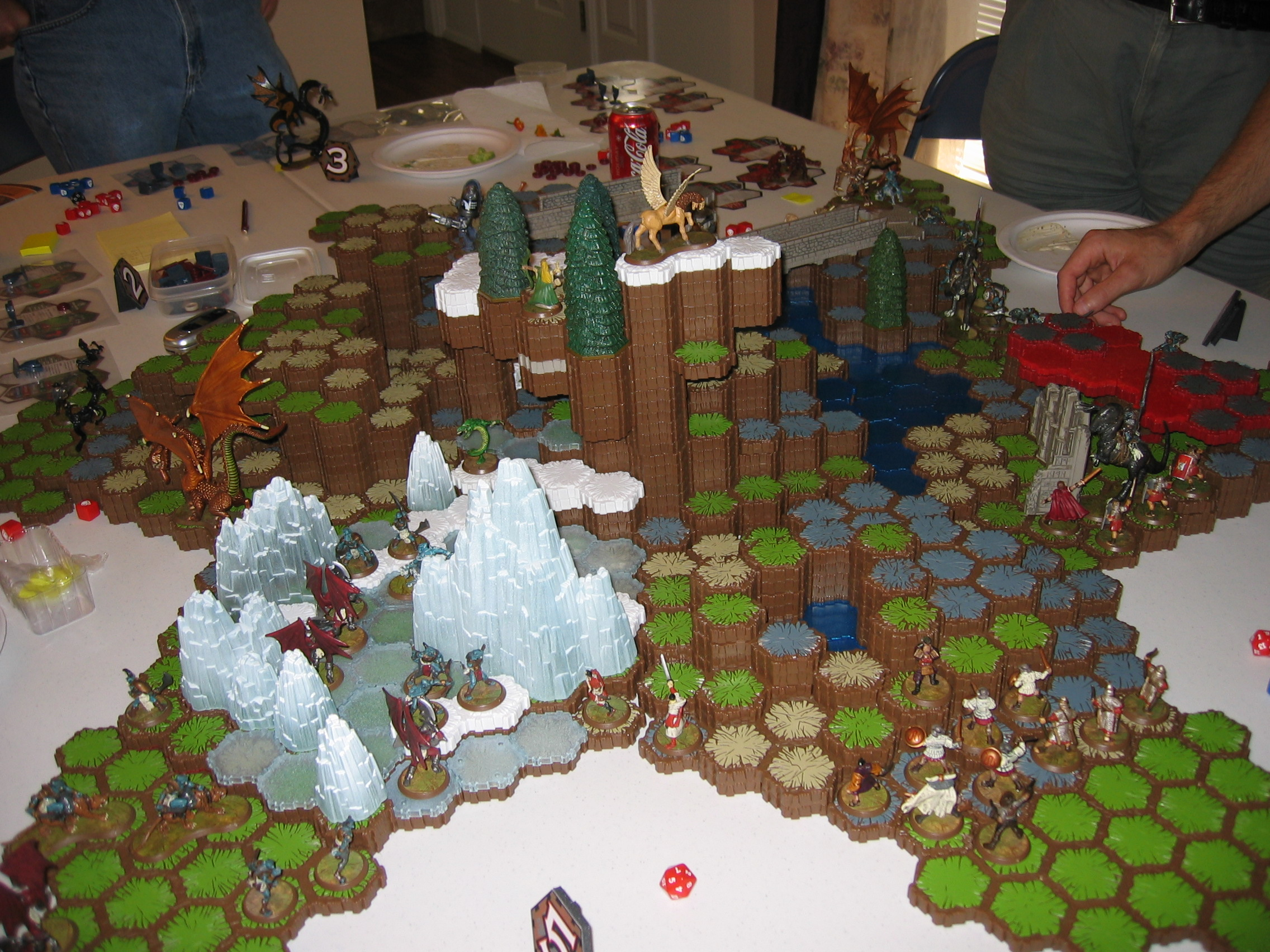
- A six-person game of Heroscape using multiple Master Sets and Expansion Sets.
- Publishers: Milton Bradley (2004–2008); Wizards of the Coast (2008–2010); Renegade Game Studios (2024–present)
- Players: 2 or more
- Setup time: 20'
- Playing time: 20' – 1+ hours
- Chance: Medium
- Age range: 8 and up
- Skills: Dice rolling, Strategy

Heroscape (stylized as "heroScape" or "HeroScape") is an expandable turn-based miniature wargaming system originally manufactured by Hasbro subsidiaries from 2004 until its discontinuation in November 2010. Geared towards younger players, the game is played using pre-painted miniature figures on a board made from interlocking hexagonal tiles, allowing for the construction of an interchangeable and variable 3D landscape. This system and the production quality of the game materials have been lauded by fans even after its discontinuation, eventually leading to its revival in 2024.

== History ==
Heroscape was first released in 2004 by game designers Craig Van Ness, Rob Daviau, and Stephen Baker through the Milton Bradley Company under Hasbro. The first master set was entitled Rise of the Valkyrie, featuring thirty plastic figures and corresponding cards, eighty-five terrain pieces of various sizes, and two ruins structures. From 2004 to 2008, releases included another master set (Swarm of the Marro), ten small-figure expansions, three large-figure expansions, and four large terrain expansions, alongside various exclusive sets and figures through partnerships with Walmart, Toys "R" Us, and Gen Con.

In 2007, a master set based on Marvel Comics was released, entitled The Conflict Begins. Hasbro had recently acquired the license to produce Marvel-themed toys and merchandise. Featuring ten comic book characters and urban-style terrain, the Marvel expansion is still compatible with the regular game.

In 2008, Hasbro shifted the Heroscape brand away from Milton Bradley to Wizards of the Coast (WOTC). At the time, WOTC was also responsible for the development and distribution of Dungeons & Dragons (D&D). From 2008 to 2010, another master set (Battle for the Underdark) and three small-figure expansions were released featuring D&D-themed characters and concepts. These behind-the-scenes changes were reportedly intended to reduce production costs, but players also interpreted it as an attempt to convert players away from Heroscape to the more popular D&D line of products. On November 3, 2010, Wizards of the Coast announced that they would be discontinuing production of Heroscape products in favor of focusing on developing their core games: Dungeons & Dragons and Magic: The Gathering. This announcement included the cancellation of various expansions already in development, such as a second wave of Marvel content. An immediate backlash occurred within the Heroscape community, including petitions and threats of boycotts. Despite the lack of official production for over a decade, the game remained popular with a strong community, regular tournaments, and user-created content.

In 2015, Wizards of the Coast published Magic: The Gathering – Arena of the Planeswalkers, incorporating the rules and terrain based on Heroscape, but with the addition of spell cards, summoning, and select creatures and spells from the Magic: The Gathering universe. Two expansions were later released: Battle for Zendikar, which featured additional figures, updates, and combinations; and Shadows Over Innistrad, which adds a battlefield obstacle called the cryptolith. Some considered Arena of the Planeswalkers to be the spiritual successor to Heroscape, while others still disagreed. The game was discontinued in 2016.

During the August 2022 Gen Con, Hasbro announced that another of their subsidiaries, Avalon Hill, would be attempting to release a new expansion entitled Heroscape: Age of Annihilation, showcasing a teaser trailer featuring new figures and terrain. Original co-designer Craig Van Ness was involved with the project, along with other dedicated members of the Heroscape community. A HasLab crowdfunding campaign ran from October to November 2022, but it did not reach the required number of backers by the deadline.

In June 2023, Renegade Game Studios announced that it was taking responsibility for the reboot after reaching a licensing deal with Hasbro. In March 2024, Renegade revealed that the first wave would include the master set Age of Annihilation, along with expansion sets Battle for the Wellspring and The Grove at Laur's End.

== Gameplay ==
=== Game modes and terrain ===
Designed for two or more players ages 8 and older, the game can also be easily adapted for a large group of players, particularly if multiple master sets and expansion sets are used.

The game comes with two sets of rules: the basic rules create a simpler and shorter game accessible to younger players, while the advanced rules are designed for a longer and more complicated game for older and more experienced players. Regardless of the game mode, each miniature figure or squad of figures has a corresponding card, called an army card, with the basic game mode printed on one side and advanced game mode on the other. For the basic game, only the factors of movement, range, attack, and defense are used, while the advanced game considers these factors, plus point value, health, species, class, personality, size, and special abilities.

To play the game, a master set is required, which contains enough tiles to build a battlefield large enough for more than two players, but experienced players often combine multiple sets to create larger and more elaborate playing surfaces. Over the course of production, four total master sets were released. The original, Rise of the Valkyrie, includes grass, rock, sand, and water pieces of various tile sizes, plus two ruins to diversify the playing surface. Various expansions and the other master sets add molten lava, lava field, snow, ice, swamp grass, swamp water, dungeon, shadow, road, concrete, and asphalt tiles, in addition to ruins, trees, glaciers, jungle vegetation, rock outcrops, a bridge system, and even a castle structure, complete with walls, turrets, and a gate.

=== Building the scenario ===
Heroscape requires players to construct the three-dimensional playing surface for the game. Scenarios from the master set or some of the larger expansions include detailed instructions for board setups, but many players enjoy designing their own. While the original master set Rise of the Valkyrie was released in 2004, two more master sets were released in 2007. Continuing the story from the first set, The Swarm of the Marro was released in August and features two alternate models of characters from Rise of the Valkyrie, plus new characters. The previous month, the Marvel Comics Master Set called The Conflict Begins was released, containing five heroes and five villains from the Marvel Comics universe. Following the transition to Wizards of the Coasts, a master set based on the Dungeons & Dragons franchise was released in 2010, entitled Battle for the Underdark.

There are also separate smaller expansions that contain a new set of themed terrain along with a new unit(s) that takes advantage of said terrain. Volcarren Wasteland contains lava and volcanic rock tiles; Thaelenk Tundra contains ice and snow tiles, plus large glaciers; Road to the Forgotten Forest contains roads, bridge pieces, and trees of varying sizes; and Ticalla Jungle features more trees and jungle vegetation.

=== Selecting armies ===
Each player selects one or more "units," where a unit may be a unique and distinct hero or an entire squad of generic figures. Army cards explain the various attributes and special abilities are packaged with each unit. There are four types of units in the original game: Unique Hero, Common Hero, Unique Squad, and Common Squad. Hero cards are associated with a single figure and squad cards are associated with a set of two or more figures. In their army, a given player may only have one of a unique hero or squad, but there is no limit on how many copies of a common hero or squad may be selected. D&D Heroscape introduced a fifth type of unit: Uncommon Hero. These play just like Unique Heroes, but a player can have more than one in his army and one must keep track of which one belongs to which card since they can take damage (as opposed to Common units, which only have one hit point). The idea proved to be unpopular, as most players simply played with them as if they were just Unique Heroes.

All basic game scenarios and some advanced game scenarios specify the units for each player. Most advanced game scenarios allow players to choose units based on the points values printed on the army card. Usually, scenarios have a different number of points that you can use to buy characters. Depending on the scenario, players may be required to place their team in a specific location, or they may randomly select where each player begins.

Playable units in Heroscape are divided between Archkyrie Generals, fighting on the fictional planet of Valhalla. All started as Valkyrie who discovered and drank from mythical Wellsprings, which granted them the ability to manipulate spacetime to gather massive armies from numerous planets, dimensions, and time periods. Five generals (Jandar, Ullar, Vydar, Einar, and Utgar) appeared in the original game; Aquilla was introduced in 2007; and Valkrill was introduced in 2010 as part of D&D Heroscape.

Despite this backstory, players are free to draft any combination of characters without regard for the in-game alliances or hostilities, unless a group specifically wants to play through the events of the story. Only a few characters' army cards have special abilities that specifically reference the generals.

- Jandar is considered an archetypical "heroic general," fighting to stop Utgar from using the wellsprings to conquer all of Valhalla, the universe, and possibly time itself. His army includes the Sentinel faction of Kyrie, Sgt. Drake Alexander and his Airborne Elite from an alternate version of World War II, Vikings, knights, yetis, robotic Omnicron Snipers, the cowboy Johnny "Shotgun" Sullivan, Scottish warriors, and the white dragon Nilfheim. Jandar's army cards have a blue and white color scheme.
- Ullar consistently allies with Jandar, with his army consisting of species often referenced in the fantasy genre with an overall "good nature" theme. His army consists of elves, reptilian assassins called Vipers, Shaolin monks, the giant Jotun, the gryphillin Theracus, the Protector faction of Kyrie, the green dragon Charos, and the cowboy sniper "Deadeye" Dan. Ullar's army cards have a dark green and brown color scheme.
- Vydar is the only "true-neutral" of the neutral generals, aiding either Jandar or Utgar as it suits his own mysterious agenda. His army is very futuristic and technological, mainly consisting of advanced humans and robots, while also incorporating the gun-wielding gorilla-like Primadons, a dog-like alien creature called Dünd, the undead queen Sudema, and the black dragon Braxas. Vydar's army cards have a grey and navy blue color scheme.
- Einar first allied with Utgar, but later shifted his alliance to join Jandar. His army consists almost entirely of humans from the history of Earth, including warriors from Ancient Rome, Ancient Greece, the American Revolutionary War, and feudal Japan. Exceptions to this include the Imperium faction of Kyrie, the red dragon Zelrig, and a cyclops-like ogre named Gurei-Oni. Einar's army cards have an orange and purple color scheme.
- Utgar is the archetypical "conqueror/overlord," a villainous figure fighting to take control of the mysterious wellsprings in order to use their power to conquer Valhalla, and then the rest of time and space. His army consists of dark forces including the Minion faction of Kyrie, the hive-controlled skeletal Marro, orcs with dinosaur mounts, robots, the undead (ghosts, zombies, and vampires), wolves, werewolves, ogres, and the dragons Mimring, Othkurik, and Moltenclaw, among a scattering of other creatures and beings. Utgar's army cards have a red and black color scheme.
- In 2007, Aquilla was the first new general to be introduced, as well as the only female general. Little is known about this mysterious general, except that she is allied with Jandar. Aquilla's army is made up of a darker fantasy/nature theme, with squads of Fyorlag spiders and other giant bugs, Native Americans, and fantasy dwarves. Aquilla's army cards have a black and gold color scheme.
- In 2010, Valkrill was introduced in later expansions for D&D Heroscape as an initial ally of Utgar who turned and formed his own evil and chaotic faction. As Heroscape would be canceled shortly after his introduction, Valkirill possesses the smallest army, consisting of demons, goblins, orcs, and the undead. Valkrill's army cards have a dark olive-green and rusty bronze color scheme.
- In 2022, Revna was revealed in the Avalon Hills announcements regarding Heroscape: Age of Annihilation. After the game transferred subsidiaries, Renegade Game Studios maintained Revna's status as a new general effectively replacing Valkrill's macabre theming and having similarly gray-colored army cards.
- In 2022, Volarak was also revealed in the Avalon Hills announcements, leading a chaotic steampunk style army with lime green army cards.

The Marvel expansion entitled The Conflict Begins includes ten Marvel superheroes and villains that are not allied with any particular general, though they are still fully compatible with the other characters. Each card has a unique color scheme reflecting the comic book origins of the specific hero or villain.

=== Structure of a round ===
The flow of play in Heroscape is broken up into rounds and turns. The terms are often used interchangeably in other board games, but there is a key distinction in Heroscape with each round including 3 turns for each player.

At the beginning of the round, each player must place order markers on their armies. Order markers determine which armies will be used during that round and what order they will be utilized. These markers indicate the turn in which each unit will be activated, but the numbers are hidden from the table. A fourth "dummy" marker may also be placed to add some ambiguity as to which units one will be activating. The same unit may be activated multiple times in a single round by placing multiple order markers on it.

After order markers have been placed, each player rolls a twenty-sided initiative die. The highest roller takes the first turn and play passes to the left.

The player with the highest initiative roll begins his first turn by revealing which unit contains his first order marker. A turn usually consists of moving and then attacking. For squads, each figure in the squad is moved before any may attack. The number of hexes that each figure may move is listed on its card. Typical movement amounts range from 4 to 8 and normally moving one hex costs one point movement. Certain types of terrain are dangerous (e.g. lava), impassable (e.g. glaciers), slow you down (e.g. snow) or speed you up (e.g. roads). Moving up in elevation also costs additional movement points for each level, but not for moving down. Some figures' special abilities, such as flying, may also affect movement.

After movement has been completed, each surviving figure in the unit may attack any figure within its range and line of sight. Melee units are those with a range of one, and ranged units typically have a range of four or more.

The number of dice rolled for offense is listed on the army card, but may be improved by various bonuses, including terrain bonuses, elevation bonuses, or special abilities. The attack dice contain skulls on three surfaces (in 1st edition) giving a 50% chance at scoring a hit for each die. The defender likewise calculates how many defense dice he may roll, based on his unit's natural defense value and any other bonuses (terrain, elevation, special abilities, etc.). The defense dice contain only two shields, giving a statistical advantage to the attacker. In the second edition the defense and attack dice are combined into one white dice, with three chances for attack, two chances for defense, and one chance for a blank roll.

If the defender rolls a number of shields equal to or higher than the number of skulls rolled by the attacker, nothing happens. If the number is lower, the defender receives a number of wound markers equal to the difference. Once a unit receives a number of wound markers equal to its total life points, it is destroyed and removed from the playing surface immediately. Heroes usually have multiple life points; squads always have one life point per figure in the squad. In the basic rules version of the game the wound marker system is not used, and each unit simply has one life point; hero units usually have exaggerated defense to compensate.

Various abilities by specific units may modify these rules to some degree (e.g., the samurai may counterattack and inflict damage while defending), but this move/attack/defense flow is typical of a turn.

Once the player has finished all of his attacks, play passes to the left, and that player then reveals his first order marker and takes his turn. Play continues in this manner until the final player has completed his first turn, and then play resumes with the first player, who reveals his second order marker and takes a turn with that unit. This process is repeated for the third order marker, and then the round is completed. Sometimes a player will lose a turn if the unit he had placed an order marker on was destroyed on a previous player's turn.

=== Victory ===
The conditions for victory vary based on the scenario. Time limits, round limits, holding certain locations, quest-like goals, or "last man standing" variants are all common. In tournament settings, there is often a "Fractional Scoring" system used when time expires. In this case, the player with the most points remaining at the end of the time limits wins.

== Reception ==
Heroscape's interlocking hexagonal system and the relatively high production quality of the game materials have been lauded by fans years after the game was discontinued.

In a review of Heroscape in Black Gate, Howard Andrew Jones said "Two thumbs way up for both the game and the expansion. Sometimes the products I buy are really neat and I read and enjoy them... then put them on the shelf. This is one that my whole family can enjoy for many years to come. If you used to love the idea of the original Risk but grew frustrated at the way blind dumb luck could overrule actual tactical planning, you're likely to enjoy this game. A lot."

In a 2022 retrospective review, Comic Book Resources ranked Heroscape as the best discontinued board game, noting the ambition of "combining the fun of Lego with the excitement of miniature games." They also discussed how the modern-day costs of plastics indicate that a game of such scope and scale could never be replicated today, hence the interest in buying second-hand.

== Reviews ==
- Family Games: The 100 Best

== Fan-generated content and tournaments ==
=== Fan-generated content ===
Heroscape players have created much fan-generated content and material, including custom terrain, jungle pieces made out of aquarium plants, battle boards, ruins, buildings, and sci-fi terrain. Custom figures are also created in a variety of ways: some create cards for figures from other miniature games, and some 3D print their own using online software. Groups of players have formed to create and play-test custom figures.

- The Classic Customs Creators of Valhalla (C3V) attempts to keep continuity with the official Heroscape characters, backstories, and themes by play-tested against official figures.
- The Soldiers of Valhalla (SoV) reviews existing customs created by members for inclusion into "Fanscape."
  - Valhalla Customs (VC) is the collective name for the C3V and the SoV, whom work very closely together.
- The Comics Customs Creators Guild (C3G) releases superhero customs, mostly using HeroClix figures play-tested against the canon Marvel Heroscape figures, as well as updated versions of latter to balance their abilities.
- Various groups have come together to play-test figures from a number of different franchises such as Star Wars, Middle-Earth, and Teenage Mutant Ninja Turtles using previously existing figures or creating new 3D printed versions using a number of different software systems.

Although fan-generated content may be posted at various online outlets, the most prominent community of custom creators and their creations is found on forums of the fan-site Heroscapers.com.

=== Tournaments and events ===
Hasbro and Wizards of the Coast never held nor supported officially sanctioned events such as they had with Magic: The Gathering, Pokémon or Axis & Allies; however, a fan-run tournament scene started up soon after the release of Heroscape. The biggest tournaments have been held at major gaming conventions such as Gen Con or multi-genre conventions such as Comic-Con, but various local and regional tournaments are run regularly.

=== Revival ===
In August 2022 (twelve years after the original game's discontinuation), another Hasbro subsidiary, Avalon Hill, announced that they would be attempting to revive Heroscape by releasing a HasLab crowdfunding campaign for a new expansion, entitled Heroscape: Age of Annihilation. The HasLab ran from October to November 2022, and they did not receive enough backers to justify the production of the new master set. In June 2023, Renegade Game Studios announced that it was taking responsibility for the reboot after reaching a licensing deal with Hasbro.

On March 1, 2024 Renegade Game Studios announced that Wave 1 would be released in August 2024, with the first wave including a master set and two expansions. As a first, Renegade Game Studios gave the option to buy these new sets and expansions with the choice of either unpainted or pre-painted miniature figures at different retail price points dependent upon players' personal preference and/or financial situation. In addition, Renegade Game Studios announced a new Heroscape Play Network that will help local game stores run regular tournaments for Heroscape.
