= Kindred of the Ebony Kingdom =

Role-playing game supplement

- Cover art
- Designers: Justin Achilli, Voronica Whitney-Robinson, Will Hindmarch, Jason Feldstein, Joddie Gray, James Lowder
- Publishers: White Wolf
- Publication: 2003
- Genres: Personal horror
- Systems: Storyteller System

Kindred of the Ebony Kingdom is a source book, alternative setting, and stand-alone pen-and-paper role-playing game (RPG) designed for Vampire: The Masquerade, Vampire: The Dark Ages, and other games set in the Old World of Darkness universe. It was developed by White Wolf Game Studios and released in 2003. The setting focuses on vampires in the continent of Africa.

== Overview ==
The Kindred of the Ebony Kingdom, known as the Laibon, are fictional European vampires native to Africa in the Old World of Darkness. Despite sharing roots with the Western Kindred (traditional vampires) and being afflicted with the same curse, the Laibon have existed in relative isolation from the Western Kindred for some time and have become distinct from traditional vampires. They do not consider themselves to be descended from Caine (the first vampire), but rather view their existence as related to various African myths and legends.

Unlike Kindred, who are most commonly defined in-game by their adherence to or violation of "Humanity", the Laibon owe a dual loyalty to their mortal counterparts (called Aye) and to the spirit world (called Orun). Failure of these loyalties leads to monstrous degeneration and feral predatory behavior. High levels of Aye causes a Laibon to appear alive while high levels of Orun causes a Laibon to appear unearthly and often demonic. Those few Laibon who manage to maintain high levels of Aye and Orun simultaneously appear angelic, possibly even transcendent.

== Tenets of the Ebony Kingdom ==
In the RPG, the Tenets have been handed down for millennia and represent the conservative status quo of Laibon society. Recently brought into question by the rapid change of the modern world, they are nevertheless fiercely upheld by the Guruhi and the Shango.

1. The Guruhi Are The Land: As the oldest Legacy, the Guruhi have a natural right to rule.
2. Those Who Endure Judge: Leadership and status are naturally assumed to derive from age and experience.
3. Belonging Grants Protection: More cynically, "citizenship implies fealty".
4. The Secret Must Be Kept: This ensures that mortals are not acutely aware of the existence of the undead.
5. No Secrets From The Magaji: This Tenet is enforced to keep the Magaji (ruler) "in the know."
6. Sires Command, Children Inherit: In other words, just as age determines leadership, lineage determines fealty.
7. The Eldest Command Undeath: A reinforcement of the rulership by the eldest.
8. Travelers Obey The Tenets: This twofold rule requires that Laibon away from home adhere to the Tenets, as do outsiders in the Ebony Kingdom.
9. The Eldest Are Kholo: This Tenet allows some flexibility in any given area's power structure, as traveling elders (particularly among the Kinyonyi) are granted due respect despite their not belonging.

== Legacies ==
Unlike the highly political clans of the western Kindred, Laibon can be divided into legacies, which are more akin to extended familial relations than unified factions. These legacies are bound by a common lineage and curse but hold no full loyalty to one another. They include the Akunanse, Children of Damballah, Guruhi, Ishtarri, Kinyonyi, Mla Watu, the Naglopers, Nkulu Zao, Osebo, Shango, and the Xi Dundu.

== Other factions ==
Other major players in the World of Darkness setting also have interactions with the Ebony Kingdom legacies, including the Ghiberti bloodline of the clan Giovanni, the Malkavians, and the Ventru.

== Laibon Bloodline ==
When first introduced in Vampire: The Dark Ages, the Laibon were presented as a bloodline of wandering wise men and shaman from Africa. Since the publication of Kindred of the Ebony Kingdom, Laibon has become the blanket term for all African Kindred who belong to one of several different lineages. Although the Laibon remain an option for Dark Ages game settings, in such a case they are probably meant to represent the wandering Akunanse Lineage.

Bloodline	Founder	Parent Clan	Faction	Disciplines	Nicknames	Weakness
Laibon	Fakir Al Sidi	Gangrel	Independent	Abombwe, Animalism, Fortitude	Sphinxes, Watchers	If a Laibon expends or ingests Blood Points, the "Beast" automatically consumes a point, or two points for an ingestion / expenditure of five or greater in a scene. Laibon grow hungry much quicker than other Kindred.

== Reception ==
Reception
Review scores
Source	Rating
Backstab	2/5 stars
Casus Belli	4/6 stars

Backstab was critical of the sourcebook, saying that while it had a good concept, it was poorly implemented and written, with information often being hard to find and embedded in pieces of short fiction. They compared it unfavorably to an earlier sourcebook, Kindred of the East. Meanwhile, French RPG magazine Casus Belli gave Kindred of the Ebony Kingdom mixed reviews.
