= New York by Night =

New York by Night is a 2001 role-playing game supplement published by White Wolf Publishing for Vampire: The Masquerade.

== Contents ==
New York by Night is a supplement in which New York City is presented as a newly reclaimed but unstable Camarilla domain—its history, geography, and key Kindred laid out as a volatile backdrop.

== Reviews ==
- Backstab #36
- Realms of Fantasy
- Dosdediez V2 #23 (Mar 2003) p. 18
