= Guide to the Camarilla =

Guide to the Camarilla is a 1999 role-playing game supplement published by White Wolf Publishing for Vampire: The Masquerade.

== Contents ==
Guide to the Camarilla is a supplement in which the sect's history, secrets, traditions, and new clans, bloodlines, disciplines, and rituals are detailed.

== Reviews ==
- Backstab #14
- Realms of Fantasy
- Casus Belli V1 #119 (Apr-May 1999) p. 72
- Player.it
- Dragão Brasil #47 (Feb 1999) p. 6
- Dragão Brasil #62 (May 2000) p. 12-13
- Envoyer #37 (Nov 1999)
- Envoyer #38 (Dec 1999)
- Envoyer #43 (May 2000)
- Envoyer #28 (Feb 1999)
- SF Site
- Rollespilsmagasinet Fønix #25 (May 1999) p. 36-37
- Dosdediez V2 #9 (May 1999) p. 22
- Dosdediez V2 #13 (Apr 2000) p. 18
- Dosdediez V2 #13 (Apr 2000) p. 22
