= Rouen (disambiguation) =

Rouen is the historical capital city of Normandy, France.

Rouen may also refer to:

== Family name ==
- Charles Rouen (born 1838), Belgian military historian
- Tom Rouen (born 1968), American football punter

== Other ==
- Rouen Mountains, Antarctica
- Rouen Duck, a heavyweight breed of domesticated duck
- PS Rouen, a paddle steamer
