= Who's Who Among Vampires: Children of the Inquisition =

Role-playing game supplement

Who's Who Among Vampires: Children of the Inquisition is a 1992 role-playing supplement for Vampire: The Masquerade published by White Wolf Publishing.

== Contents ==
Who's Who Among Vampires: Children of the Inquisition is a supplement in which Dracula and 12 other vampires are detailed and illustrated.

== Reception ==
Berin Kinsman reviewed Who's Who Among Vampires: Children of the Inquisition in White Wolf #35 (March/April, 1993), rating it a 4 out of 5 and stated that "The bad news, folks, is that there aren't any game mechanics included. For this, you should feel fortunate; you don't WANT to run into these vampires. Besides, it maintains the air of mystery when you can't nail down for certain what these Kindred are capable of."

== Reviews ==
- Casus Belli V1 #74 (Mar-Apr 1993) p. 22
- Dragão Brasil #34 (Jan 1998) p. 18-23
- Flames Rising
- Game Creation and Careers p. 633
- Saga #19 (Feb 1993) p. 5
- Australian Realms #10 (Mar-Apr 1993) p. 44
- Dosdediez V2 #3 (Dec 1997) p. 14
