= The Player's Guide =

The Player's Guide is a 1991 role-playing supplement for Vampire: The Masquerade published by White Wolf Publishing.

== Contents ==
The Player's Guide is a supplement in which rules are presented to help players develop their characters.

== Reception ==
Steve Crow reviewed Player's Guide in White Wolf #31 (May/June, 1992), rating it a 4 out of 5 and stated that "Overall, Player's Guide is an excellent buy. When it deals purely with Vampire player characters and how to develop them, it is exceedingly useful. Peripheral material, such as Equipment and World of the Kindred, are less useful, but entertaining if your interests lie in that area."

== Reviews ==
- Abyss Quarterly #50
- Saga #12 (Jan 1992) p. 5
