= Clanbook: Tzimisce =

1995 role-playing game supplement

Clanbook: Tzimisce is a 1995 role-playing game supplement published by White Wolf Publishing for Vampire: The Masquerade.

== Contents ==
Clanbook: Tzimisce is a supplement in which the Tzimisce vampire clan is detailed.

== Reviews ==
- Backstab #29 (Apr 2001) p. 85
- Backstab #40 (Aug–Sep 2002) p. 72
- Envoyer #20 (Jun 1998)
- Envoyer #13 (Nov 1997)
- Rollespilsmagasinet Fønix (Issue 12 – March/April 1996) p. 61
- Dosdediez V2 #11 (Nov 1999) p. 16
- D20 #6 p. 15
- D20 #7 p. 14
