= Sabbat: The Black Hand =

2021 tabletop role-playing game supplement

- Cover art by Mark Kelly, depicting the vampire Lucita
- Illustrators: Tomas Arfert (art director)
- Writers: Justin Achilli; Alan Alexander; Khaldoun Khelil; Karim Muammar
- Publishers: Renegade Game Studios
- Publication: October 27, 2021
- Genres: Tabletop role-playing game supplement
- Parent games: Vampire: The Masquerade (5th edition)
- Series: World of Darkness
- Website: Official website
- ISBN: 978-1-735993-88-1

Sabbat: The Black Hand is a tabletop role-playing game supplement released on October 27, 2021 by Renegade Game Studios, for use with the game Vampire: The Masquerade, and is part of the larger World of Darkness series. It describes the Sabbat, an antagonistic and apocalyptical sect of vampires who follow the mythical first vampire Caine, and their relationships to other factions in the game's setting.

== Overview ==
Sabbat: The Black Hand is a sourcebook for use with the fifth edition of the horror tabletop role-playing game Vampire: The Masquerade, where players take the roles of vampires. It describes the Sabbat, an antagonistic, apocalyptical sect of vampires following the mythical first vampire Caine and his teachings, awaiting his return. As such, the sect members revel in their vampiric nature and follow alternate codes of morality – paths of enlightenment – involving their relationship with the beast inside each vampire, and see it as their mission to help bring the end of unworthy vampires in Caine's name. The book also describes the Sabbat's relationship with other groups, such as the Camarilla, which shuns the Sabbat's teachings, and the Antediluvians, whom the Sabbat see as their enemy.

In addition to the lore and fiction, the book contains additions to the gameplay mechanics, with new discipline powers and rites for characters to use. The book is intended to be used by storytellers (Note: The person leading the game is called the "storyteller" in World of Darkness games, a role called "gamemaster" or "dungeon master" in other role-playing games.) in their campaigns, both as part of new campaigns and as extensions of on-going ones.

== Production ==
Sabbat: The Black Hand was written by Justin Achilli, the series' creative lead, together with Alan Alexander, Khaldoun Khelil, and the series' editor Karim Muammar, based on the original Sabbat concept by Steven C. Brown and Andrew Greenberg from earlier Vampire: The Masquerade books. In addition to working on the book's graphic design, layout, and interior art, Tomas Arfert was the project's art director, and worked with several artists including cover artist Mark Kelly.

The book is published by Renegade Game Studios, one of the World of Darkness series owner Paradox Interactive's publishing partners following their reorganization of the handling of the series in 2020. Along with this reorganization is a different development process compared to prior books, which involves working together with diversity consultants and diversity readers to ensure that themes and topics are depicted respectfully; Sabbat: The Black Hand is the first book in the series to be developed through that process.

Achilli had been working on the project even before he joined Paradox Interactive, and had thought about how to incorporate the sect in the fifth edition of the game. The idea of Sabbat vampires as player characters were seen as counter to the fifth edition's theme of humanity for vampires, formulated as the riddle "a beast I am, lest a beast I become", which led to the decision to portray them primarily as antagonists and as a cautionary tale showing what happens to vampires who do not care about their humanity. The sect was treated similarly to how it had been in Vampire: The Masquerade's first edition (1991), where it is portrayed as a mysterious group in the shadows, as opposed to how it had been depicted in later editions. Achilli compared this to how he considered A Nightmare on Elm Street's Freddy Krueger to be the scariest in the first film in the series, where less was known about him. One of the hardest parts of the design process involved making the Sabbat vampires come across as alien and stand out from other vampires in the setting.

The book was designed to be usable in any Vampire: The Masquerade campaign, with the intention that the Sabbat should be possible to insert into campaigns as a new conflict for the players, and shake the status quo. Its structure differs from the previous sect books for the game's fifth edition, Anarch and Camarilla: whereas those were conceived as and structured as similar to coffee table books, Sabbat: The Black Hand is formatted primarily as a game book, with advice on how to use each part of the book in a game campaign.

Sabbat: The Black Hand was released by Renegade Game Studios on October 27, 2021, following a delay from August, both as a hardcover 140-page print book and as an e-book. It was planned to be released in Italian by Need Games, in Polish by Alis Games, and in Spanish by Biblioteca Oscura.

== Reception ==
Sabbat: The Black Hand was nominated for the 2021 ioGioco awards for Best Role-Playing Supplement, but lost to the Dungeons & Dragons book Brancalonia.
