= Runa, West Virginia =

- Unincorporated community
- Location within West Virginia Location within the United States
- Coordinates: 38°08′34″N 80°51′04″W
- Country: United States
- State: West Virginia
- County: Nicholas
- Elevation: 2,215 ft (675 m)
- Time zone: UTC-5 (Eastern (EST))
  - Summer (DST): UTC-4 (EDT)
- Area codes: 304 & 681
- GNIS feature ID: 1555539

Runa is an unincorporated community in Nicholas County, West Virginia, United States. Runa is 9.5 miles (15.3 km) south of Summersville.

The community was named after Runa McClung, the sister of an early settler.
