= Clanbook: Brujah =

1992 role-playing game supplement

- Publisher: White Wolf Publishing
- Publication date: 1992

Clanbook: Brujah is a 1992 role-playing supplement for Vampire: The Masquerade published by White Wolf Publishing.

== Contents ==
Clanbook: Brujah is a supplement in which the history and traditions of the Brujah clan is detailed.

== Publication history ==
Shannon Appelcline commented on that with Vampire: The Masquerade supplements, "no one had before put out splatbooks as consistently and in such volume as White Wolf did. Clanbook: Brujah (1992) was the first. It focused on a single vampire clan, leaving room for another dozen splatbooks in the same line. White Wolf would go on to produce splatbooks for all of their initial lines except Wraith and the term 'splatbook' was eventually coined for White Wolf's releases."

== Reception ==
Berin Kinsman reviewed Clanbook: Brujah in White Wolf #35 (March/April, 1993), rating it a 4 out of 5 and stated that "The BIG problem is that this book has a few four-letter words in it, used in cultural context. For some reason, people feel threatened by words. Words convey ideas, and ideas fuel change and revolution. The irony of it all is, THAT's what the Brujah are about."

== Reviews ==
- Casus Belli V1 #74 (Mar-Apr 1993) p. 22
- Valkyrie
- Saga #17 (Dec 1992) p. 5
- Australian Realms #10 (Mar-Apr 1993) p. 44
- Dosdediez #8 (Jul 1996) p. 17
- Dosdediez V2 #18 (Jun 2001) p. 19
- Lider #46 (Mar 1995) p. 12
