= Clanbook: Ravnos =

1997 role-playing game supplement

Clanbook: Ravnos is a 1997 role-playing game supplement published by White Wolf Publishing for Vampire: The Masquerade.

== Contents ==
Clanbook: Ravnos is a supplement in which the Ravnos clan is explored beyond being known as nomadic tricksters. This supplement offers a look at Ravnos culture, rooted in Rom traditions but expanded to include diverse, modern interpretations. The book explores their values of freedom and familial loyalty, and explains how these seemingly lawless vampires might still cooperate within broader Kindred society. The guide delivers extensive lore, practical mechanics, and suggestions for integrating Ravnos into campaigns.

== Reception ==
Mark Barter reviewed Clanbook: Ravnos for Arcane magazine, rating it an 8 out of 10 overall, and stated that "Packed with lots of new information on Ravnos legend and history, the different gypsy families, Ravnos justice and additional abilities and disciplines, this book is essential if you want to do justice to Ravnos characters. With the usual high-quality artwork and an entertaining and easy-to-read style, this is yet another winner from White Wolf. Bring on the Giovannis!"

== Reviews ==
- Backstab #3
- Backstab #31
- Ringbote (Issue 13 - Jul/Aug 1997)
- Player.it
- Dosdediez V2 #13 (Apr 2000) p. 18
- D20 #1 p. 11-12
