= Alien Hunger =

Alien Hunger is a 1991 role-playing adventure for Vampire: The Masquerade written by Jeff Berry and published by White Wolf Publishing.

== Plot summary ==
Alien Hunger is an adventure in which the player characters are newly turned vampires in Denver with no memory of how they became vampires.

== Reception ==
Steve Crow reviewed Alien Hunger in White Wolf #32 (July/Aug., 1992), rating it a 4 out of 5 and stated that "Alien Hunger works best as exactly what is says it is: a jump-start adventure that gets new Storytellers and players into the spirit of the game."

== Reviews ==
- Casus Belli V1 #93 (Apr 1996) p. 36-38
- Saga #16 (Sep 1992) p. 20
- Dosdediez #5 (Jul-Aug 1994) p. 21
