= Milwaukee by Night =

- Publisher: White Wolf Publishing
- Publication date: 1992

Milwaukee by Night is a 1992 role-playing supplement for Vampire: The Masquerade published by White Wolf Publishing.

== Contents ==
Milwaukee by Night is a supplement in which Milwaukee must contend with Werewolves coming into the city, and its own erratic Prince.

== Reception ==
Steve Crow reviewed Milwaukee by Night in White Wolf #32 (July/Aug., 1992), rating it a 3 out of 5 and stated that "Milwaukee by Night is an excellent sourcebook and an above-average adventure. The only reason I gave it a 3 is because, despite the heavy promotion of werewolves and their role in the city, the Lupines are poorly detailed, and their role varies wildly."

== Reviews ==
- Windgeflüster (Issue 27 - Oct 1994)
- Casus Belli V1 #93 (Apr 1996) p. 36-38
- Dragon (France) #4 p. 74
- Casus Belli V1 #70 (Jul-Aug 1992) p. 17
- Saga #16 (Sep 1992) p. 20
- PC Joker #1994-9 (Sep 1994) p. 88-89
- Dosdediez #8 (Jul 1996) p. 23
- Lider V1 #55 p. 14
