= The Anarch Cookbook: A Friendly Guide to Vampire Politics =

1993 role-playing game supplement

The Anarch Cookbook: A Friendly Guide to Vampire Politics is a 1993 role-playing supplement for Vampire: The Masquerade published by White Wolf Publishing.

== Contents ==
The Anarch Cookbook is a supplement in which the Anarch Movement is detailed.

== Reception ==
Berin Kinsman reviewed The Anarch Cookbook in White Wolf #38 (1993), rating it a 3 out of 5 and stated that "Overall, the material in The Anarch Cookbook is fair, but strays far afield from the atmosphere that (in my opinion) makes Vampire: The Masquerade special."

== Reviews ==
- Só Aventuras #7 p. 32-35
- Dosdediez V2 #21 (Nov 2002) p. 19
