= Book of the Kindred =

1996 supplement for Vampire: The Masquerade

Book of the Kindred is a 1996 role-playing game supplement published by White Wolf Publishing for Vampire: The Masquerade.

== Contents ==
Book of the Kindred is a supplement that provides a summary of the World of Darkness, consisting of brief chapters on a variety of topics.

== Reception ==
Martin Klimes reviewed Book of the Kindred for Arcane magazine, rating it a 3 out of 10 overall. Klimes comments that "The material is of good quality, with descriptions of the Camarilla, of the language of the damned, some short stories set in White Wolf's beloved San Francisco, and even an extract of the Book of Nod. However, it's all window dressing to convert a channel-hopping TV audience into a gameplaying mass readership. There is nothing here that the Vampire: The Masquerade rulebook doesn't offer. If you know what Vampire is about, then you have no use for this book. If you don't then maybe you can justify buying it, even without seeing the series to get you interested. Maybe. Frankly, if you're a roleplayer then you will know if you're interested in roleplaying, and a glance through the rulebook will impart just as much information. Buy that instead, and Book of the Kindred be damned."

== Reviews ==
- Casus Belli V1 #93 (Apr 1996)
- Australian Realms #29
