= Dark Alliance: Vancouver =

Role-playing game supplement

- Cover by Tony Harris
- Designers: Nigel Findley; Geoff McMartin
- Illustrators: Jeff Rebner; Dan Smith; Joshua Gabriel Timbrook
- Publishers: White Wolf Publishing
- Publication: October 1993
- Genres: Tabletop role-playing game supplement
- Systems: Storyteller System
- Parent games: Vampire: The Masquerade; Werewolf: The Apocalypse
- Series: World of Darkness
- ISBN: 1-56504-059-7

Dark Alliance: Vancouver is a tabletop role-playing game supplement published by White Wolf Publishing in October 1993. It is part of the World of Darkness series, and is intended to be used with the games Vampire: The Masquerade and Werewolf: The Apocalypse.

== Contents ==
Dark Alliance: Vancouver details the tribes of werewolves found in Vancouver, and their war with the local vampires. If the gamemaster desires, this sourcebook can be used as a crossover between Werewolf: The Apocalypse and Vampire: The Masquerade.

The book also covers the city of Vancouver, and includes an 11-page scenario, "War and Peace", which sets up a civil war between werewolves and vampires.

== Production and release ==
Dark Alliance: Vancouver was designed by Nigel Findley and Geoff McMartin, with illustrations by Jeff Rebner, Dan Smith, and Joshua Gabriel Timbrook, and cover art by Tony Harris. The book was released by White Wolf Publishing in October 1993 as a 125-page softcover book, and reprinted in 1996 as part of the second volume of Rage Across the World, a line of Werewolf: The Apocalypse compilations, together with Rage Across Australia. Both the stand-alone version and the compilation have since been re-released as e-books.

== Reception ==
Reception
Review scores
Source	Rating
Dosdediez	4/5 stars
Dragon	3/6 stars

Rick Swan of Dragon was not a fan of the book. Although he liked the section on the area tribes, "Too much of the book, however, looks like it was cranked out by the Department of Tourism, a dreary run-down of hotels, nightclubs, and landmarks whose descriptions rarely rise above the superficial [...] Little of this is told from a Garou’s perspective, and most of it’s available in any good reference book, so what’s the point?" Swan also wasn't sure about the cross-over aspect of the book, wondering how the referee would simultaneously handle a group of werewolves in one part of the city and a group of vampires in another part of the city. "What's Group A supposed to do while the referee is busy with Group B?"
