= Renegade Game Studios =

American game company

- Type: Game company
- Founded: 2014
- Founder: Scott Gaeta.
- Headquarters: Escondido, California, United States
- Products: Board games, card games, jigsaw puzzles, role-playing games
- Website: renegadegamestudios.com

Renegade Game Studios is an American game company based in Escondido, California, that creates and publishes board games, card games, and role-playing games. In 2020, the company also began producing jigsaw puzzles using art from their games.

== History ==
In 2014, Scott Gaeta, a former Colorado games store owner and co-founder of Cryptozoic Entertainment, founded Renegade Game Studios.

From 2014 to 2017, RGS used traditional industry methods to finance the publication of their games. Starting in 2018, RGS used Kickstarter community funding to finance some larger licensed game projects such as Power Rangers: Heroes of the Grid, Scott Pilgrim Miniatures the World, and most recently Vampire: The Masquerade Rivals Expandable Card Game.

The company partnered with Paradox Interactive in 2020 and together created supplemental materials for games like Vampire: The Masquerade and Werewolf: The Apocalypse.

In October 2022, Renegade announced the extension of its partnership with Hasbro, in place since 2018. With the partnership, new versions of old games have been released, such as Transformers, Power Rangers, and G.I. JOE.

== Games published ==
Games published by RGS between 2014–2025.

- Aggretsuko Work/Rage Balance
- Altiplano
- Apotheca
- Artisans of the Splendent Vale
- Atlas: Enchanted Lands
- The Aquicorn Cove Board Game
- Arboretum
- Architects of the West Kingdom
- Artsee
- Axis & Allies
- Bargain Quest
- Battle for the Deep: Powered by Axis & Allies
- The Blood of an Englishman
- Brick Party
- Bubble Tea
- Bullfrogs
- Byzanz
- Castell
- Castles of Caladale
- Circadians First Light
- Circus Puppy
- Clank! A Deck-Building Adventure
- Clank! In! Space! A Deck-Building Adventure
- Clank! Legacy: Acquisitions Incorporated
- ClipCut Parks
- Covert
- Crimes & Capers
- Dicey Goblins
- Diplomacy
- Doggy Go!
- Dokmus
- The Doom That Came to Atlantic City
- Double Feature
- Dragon's HOard
- Embarcadero
- Eternal: Chronicles of the Throne
- Ex Libris
- Explorers of the North Sea
- Fireworks
- FLATLINE
- Flip Ships
- Flip The Bird
- The Fox in the Forest
- The Fox in the Forest Duet
- FUSE
- Gates of Delirium
- Ghostbusters: The Card Game
- GI JOE: Battle for the Arctic Circle
- GI JOE: Deck-Building Game
- GI JOE: Mission Critical
- GI JOE: Roleplaying Game
- Gloomy Graves
- Gravwell: Escape from the 9th Dimension
- Gunkimono
- Gudetama: The Tricky Egg Card Game
- Gudetama: The Tricky Egg Card Game Holiday Edition
- Heroscape
- Hex Roller
- Hokkaido
- Honshu
- Hunter: The Reckoning Roleplaying Game
- Icarus
- Junk Orbit
- Kepler-3042
- Kids on Bikes
- Kitty Paw
- Knee Jerk
- Lanterns: The Harvest Festival
- Lanterns Dice: Lights in the Sky
- Lotus
- Lucidity Six-Sided Nightmares
- My Father's Work
- My Little Pony: Adventures in Equestria Deck-Building Game
- My Little Pony: Festival of Lanterns
- My Little Pony: Roleplaying Game
- The North Sea Runesaga
- The North Sea Epilogues RPG
- Outbreak: Undead
- Overlight RPG
- Paladins of the West Kingdom
- Prowler's Passage
- Passing Through Petra
- Pie Town
- Power Rangers: Deck-Building Game
- Power Rangers: Heroes of the Grid
- Power Rangers: Roleplaying Game
- Proving Grounds
- Raiders of the North Sea
- Revolution of 1828
- Reykholt
- Risk 2210 A.D.
- Risk GI JOE: Special Missions
- Risk Godstorm
- RoboRally
- Scott Pilgrim Miniatures The World
- Scott Pilgrim's Precious Little Card Game
- Shipwrights of the North Sea
- The Search for Planet X
- Sentient
- Slap It
- Space Battle Lunchtime Card Game
- Spell Smashers
- Spy Club
- Stellar
- Subastral
- Succulent
- Sundae Split
- The Tea Dragon Society Card Game
- Teens in Space
- Terror Below
- Time Chase
- Topiary
- Trajan
- Transformers: Deck-Building Game
- Transformers: RoboRally
- Transformers: Roleplaying Game
- The Vale of Eternity
- Vampire: The Masquerade - Rivals Expandable Card Game
- Vampire: The Masquerade Roleplaying Game
- Wardlings Roleplaying Game Campaign Guide
- Welcome to Night Vale Roleplaying Game
- Wendake
- Werewolf: The Apocalypse Roleplaying Game
- World's Fair 1893

== Notable awards ==
A number of RGS games have been nominated for or have won awards. The most prominent include:

=== ENnie Awards ===
- Kids on Bikes was awarded the Gold Medal as the "2019 Best Family Game"

=== SXSW Game Awards ===
- Lanterns: The Harvest Festival was a finalist for "2016 Tabletop Game of the Year".
- Clank! In! Space! A Deck-Building Adventure was a finalist for "Tabletop Game of the Year"
- Paladins of the West Kingdom was the winner of "2020 Tabletop Game of the Year"

=== Spiel des Jahres ===
- Raiders of the North Sea was nominated for the Kennerspiel des Jahres 2017
- Fox In The Forest was listed as recommended by the Spiel De Jahres 2020 Jury

=== Mensa International ===
- Both Architects of the West Kingdom and Gunkimono were named as "2019 Mensa Select Winners"
