= Adventure (role-playing games) =

Playable scenario in a tabletop role-playing game

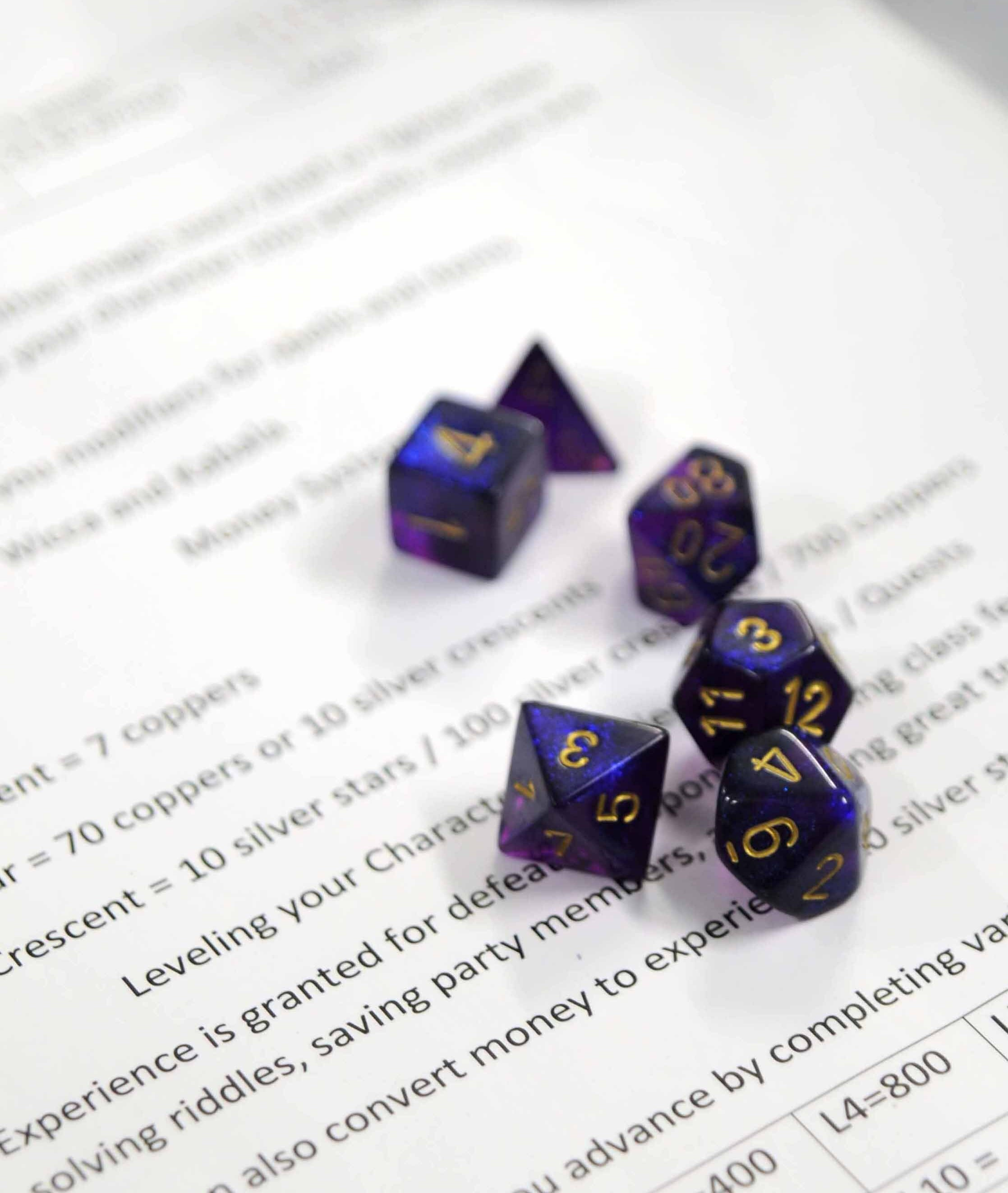
Polyhedral dice on the reference paperwork for a role-playing game adventure

An adventure is a playable scenario in a tabletop role-playing game. These can be constructed by gamemasters (Note: The role of the person leading the game is variously called the "gamemaster", "storyteller", or "dungeon master" in different role-playing games.) for their players, and are also released by game publishers as pre-made standalone adventure modules, as part of other supplements, or in magazines. Different types of designs exist, including linear adventures, where players move between scenes in a predetermined order; non-linear adventures, where scenes can go in multiple directions; and solo adventures, which are played alone, without a game group.

== Overview ==
An adventure is a playable scenario in a tabletop role-playing game which a gamemaster leads the players and their characters through. Various types of designs exist, including linear adventures, where players need to progress through each predetermined scene in turn; and non-linear adventures, where each situation can lead in multiple directions. The former is more restrictive, but is easier to manage, whereas the latter is more open-ended but more demanding for the gamemaster. A series of adventures played in succession are collectively called a campaign. Adventures meant to be played alone, without a game group, are called solo adventures.

Adventures can be created by gamemasters, but are also released by game publishers in the form of modular, supplementary books for role-playing games, sometimes combined with additional game mechanics or background information on the game's setting. Pre-written adventure modules have the advantage of being easier to run for new gamemasters, especially linear ones. Still, it is most common for groups to play adventures they have made up themselves, and even when playing published adventures, it is common for alterations to be made.

== History ==
Published adventure modules began in 1975 with Dave Arneson's The Temple of the Frog, released for the Dungeons & Dragons setting Blackmoor, and have since then become commonplace in the role-playing game industry; White Wolf Publishing, a major role-playing game publisher in the 1990s and 2000s, stood out by rarely publishing adventure modules, preferring to let gamemasters construct their own adventures. Solo adventures rose in popularity in 2020, as a result of the COVID-19 pandemic preventing people from playing role-playing games together in person.

== See also ==
- Expansion pack
