= Magia i Miecz =

Polish magazine

- Publisher: Wydawnictwo MAG (1993–2002); Kuźnia Gier Michał Stachyra (since 2014)
- Country: Poland
- Language: Polish
- Website: magiaimiecz.eu

Magia i Miecz (Polish pronunciation: [ˈmaɡja i ˈmjɛt͡ʂ]; Magic and Sword) was a Polish magazine dedicated to RPG games. It was published in 1993–2002 by Wydawnictwo MAG. It was a precursor of RPG in Poland and was influential in propagating and popularizing RPGs in the state. In 2014 the rights for the name was bought by Kuźnia Gier publisher and the magazine as again available for a few years.

== Years 1993–2002 ==
The founders and first editors of the magazine were people related to Nowa Fantastyka - Jacek Rodek and Darosław j. Toruń. The graphics inside were a responsibility of Jarosław Musiał.

Because of a lack of Polish-language RPG games at the time, the first issues were dedicated to RPG system Kryształy Czasu (pol. Crystals of Time) - unpublished, but popular at the time in the community. It was created by Artur Szyndler.

The focus of the magazine shifted over the years, gradually extending to the news from RPG games market, wargames, collectible card games, LARPs, short stories, reviews of games and books, historical articles and connect loosely related to RPGs. The list of people related to Magia i Miecz includes Artur Szyndler, Andrzej Sapkowski and Tomasz Kołodziejczak, and it featured texts written by Krzysztof Piskorski, Anna Brzezińska, Jacek Komuda, Michał Studniarek, Ignacy Trzewiczek and others.

Until the issue 71, the magazine was published in a format A4, since issue 72 in format C5. The most thick issue had 208 pages (nr. 91–92) and its cost was 15 PLN. Until 2002 there were 104 issues of Magia i Miecz (some of them double).

== Reactivation (2014) ==
On 18 March 2014, Michal Stachyra, the owner of Kuźnia Gier Publishing, announced the reactivation of the magazine in cooperation with a crowdfunding platform Wspieram.to. as part of the initiative Fajne RPG (pol. Cool RPGs). The crowdfunding ended on 18 June 2014 with 98 733 PLN, almost 4 times the minimum amount needed for the reactivation (25 000 PLN)). It was announced that the magazine would appear every 3 months, at lest in a number of 8 issues, each counting circa 130 pages in a b=B5 format. There were also electronic version of the magazine for E-book readers and tablets (formats .pdf, .mobi., .epub), and in a form of an audiobook.

The first issue, planned at first for August was finally available on 25 September 2014 as PDF and on 11 October 2014 in printed version.

Around 2018 there were at least 6 issues of the magazine and next 2 were planned.

== Editors-in-chief ==
The position of editor-in-chief, after the first editor-in-chief, Darosław J. Toruń, was held by Tomasz Kołodziejczak (June–November 1995), Artur Marciniak (December 1995-September 1997), Andrzej Miszkurka (October 1997-September 1998), Rafał Nowocień (October 1998-August 1999) and, as the last one, until the end of the magazine's existence, Tomasz Kreczmar.

== See also ==
- List of magazines in Poland
