= Mica Burton =

American actress, cosplayer and host

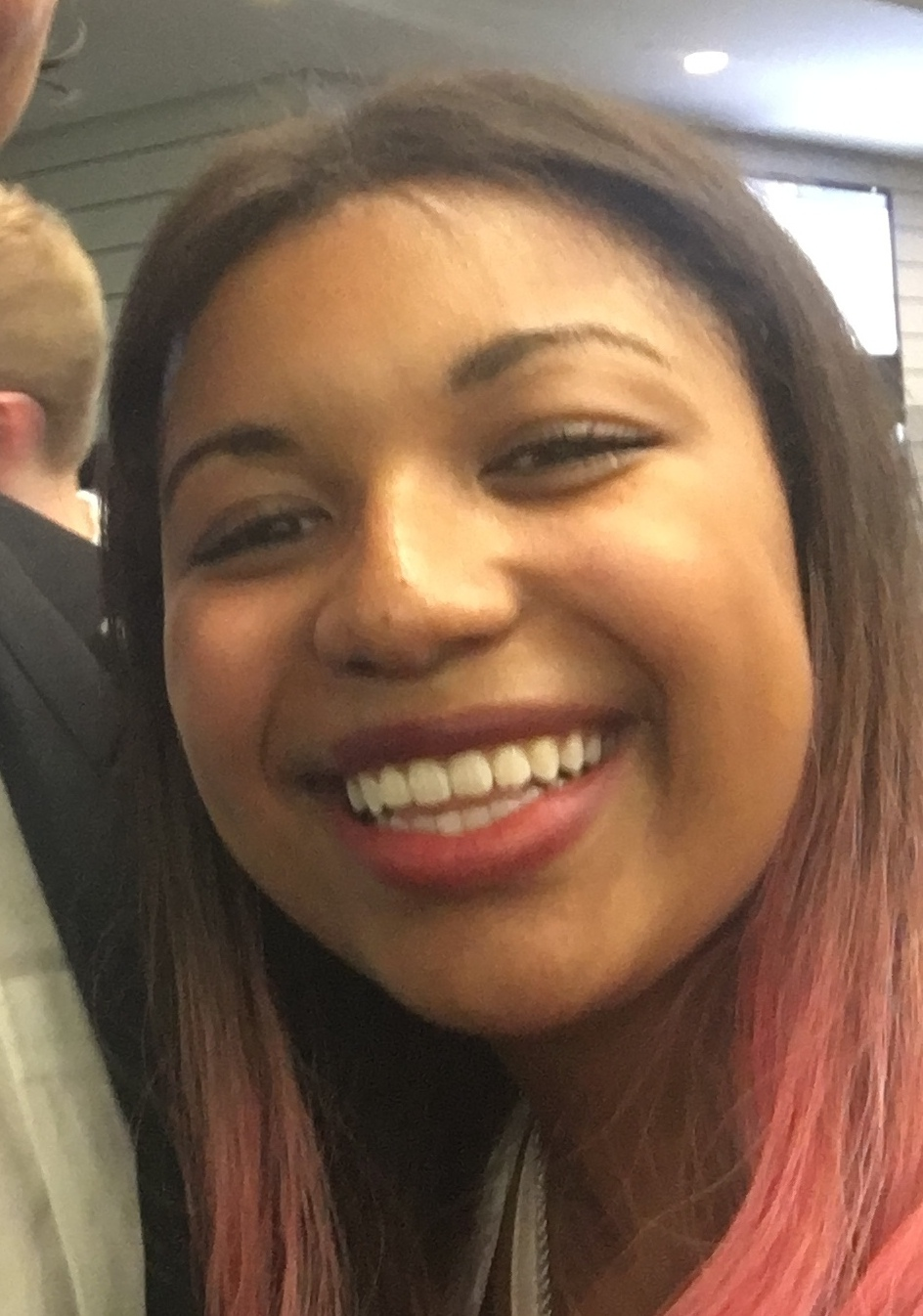
- Burton in 2016
- Born: Michaela Jean Burton
- Education: University of Michigan (BFA)
- Occupations: Actress; cosplayer; host
- Years active: 2015–present
- Father: LeVar Burton

Michaela Jean Burton is an American actress, cosplayer and host. She is known for her contributions in the gaming space, having hosted for Achievement Hunter, The Know, the Overwatch League and voicing a character in 100ft Robot Golf.

Burton has been referred to as a "nerd renaissance woman" by The New York Times and has been noted as one of only a few professional black cosplayers by Essence.

== Career ==
=== Acting ===
In 2015, Burton portrayed the role of Jules in the film Lazer Team (2015). She also briefly appeared in The Eleven Little Roosters (2017).

She voiced Vahni in 100ft Robot Golf (2016). Burton is known for her roles in actual play RPG web shows such as Wizards of the Coast's Destiny & Doom (2017) and Nights of Eveningstar (2020). Burton also guest starred in Critical Role's second campaign and in L.A. by Night.

Burton plays ensign Alandra La Forge, the daughter of Burton's father's character, Geordi La Forge, in the third season of Star Trek: Picard.

=== Cosplay ===
Burton began cosplaying in high school after attending a convention with a friend. She was commissioned by Riot Games to create League of Legends cosplay in 2019. She has also received praise for cosplays of characters from The Legend of Zelda.

=== Hosting ===
Burton, who had been a fan of the company since she was a child, joined Rooster Teeth in 2016 after meeting the founders and other employees. She began as a host in the gaming division Achievement Hunter, but later moved to the entertainment news division The Know. She left Rooster Teeth in 2018, stating in 2020 that this was due to racial issues at the company.

In 2019, Burton joined the Overwatch League as a "League Insider", conducting interviews with the players. She left in 2020.

Burton has hosted multiple Dungeons & Dragons events for Wizards of the Coast such as D&D Live 2019: The Descent and D&D Live 2021. Burton began cohosting the web series Critter Hug in 2020 for Critical Role Productions.

She was a speaker at Ubisoft's monthly Black Game Pros event in 2020. She hosted a cosplay competition at Glitchcon 2020. Burton was a cohost for a Star Trek anniversary stream in 2020 and multiple Star Trek streams on Paramount+ in 2021.

Burton hosted The PC Gaming Show during E3 2021 and during Summer Game Fest 2022. She cohosted an episode of 10 Minute Power Hour (10MPH) with the Game Grumps, entitled “HEDBANZ but it's making us doubt our sense of self...w/ Mica Burton!” The episode was published on March 18, 2024.

== Personal life ==
Burton is the daughter of makeup artist Stephanie Cozart-Burton and actor LeVar Burton.

Burton graduated from the University of Michigan in 2016 with a BFA in acting.

She is bisexual .

== Filmography ==
=== Live-action filmography ===
List of live-action performances
Year	Title	Role(s)	Notes	Source
Film and television
2005	Reading Rainbow	Self	Film	
2015	Lazer Team	Jules	Film	
2018	"Danny Don't You Know"	Concert Fan	Music Video; Ninja Sex Party	
2023	Star Trek: Picard	Ensign Alandra La Forge	TV series; recurring role	
2023	The Ready Room	Herself	Episode: "The Bounty"	
Web series and podcasts
2016–2017	Achievement Hunter	Herself	Cast and host	
2017–2018	The Know	Herself	Co-host	
2017	Destiny & Doom	Freyja Varondal	Actual play series; main role	
2018–2019	Game the Game	Herself	Guest role; 3 episodes	
2019	Critical Role (Campaign 2)	Reani	Actual play series; guest role; 3 episodes	
2019	Pub Draw	Herself	Episode: "Draw Reani with Mica Burton!"	
2020–2021	L.A. by Night	Delilah	Actual play series; guest role; 2 episodes	
2020–2021	Narrative Telephone	Herself	Guest role; 2 episodes	
2020–2021	Critter Hug	Herself	Co-host	
2020–2022	Nights of Eveningstar	Azara Mithras	Actual play series; main role	
2021	Critical Role (one-shots)	Indra	Actual play event for BlizzCon; Episode: "Diablo One-Shot"	
2021	D&D Strixhaven - Curriculum Of Chaos		Actual play event for Roll20Con	
2024	Dirty Laundry	Herself	Episode: "Who Blamed Their Sex Noises on a Videogame?"	

=== Voice-over filmography ===
List of voice-over performances
Year	Title	Role(s)	Notes	Source
2016	100ft Robot Golf	Vahni	Video game	
2025	Date Everything!	Fantina	Video game	
