= Dungeons & Dragons: The Twenty-Sided Tavern =

Dungeons & Dragons stage production

- Company: Hasbro; Curious Hedgehog; Showpath Entertainment; Wizards of the Coast
- Genre: Actual play, improv, immersive theater
- Date of premiere: May 5, 2024
- Location: Stage 42

Creative team
- Director: Michael Fell
- Carriers of Chaos: David Carpenter; David Andrew Laws; Sarah Davis Reynolds
- The Tomb of Havoc: David Carpenter; Michael Fell; Conner Marx

Other information
- Characters: Dungeon Master; Tavern Keeper; The Warrior; The Mage; The Trickster
- Setting: Forgotten Realms
- Based on: Dungeons & Dragons

Dungeons & Dragons: The Twenty-Sided Tavern is a stage production which combines actual play, improv, and immersive theater as the player cast navigate a Dungeons & Dragons adventure set in the Forgotten Realms. Audience participation ranges from select members joining the cast on stage to browser-based voting software to determine cast actions. The first adventure scenario, Carriers of Chaos, was created by David Carpenter, David Andrew Laws and Sarah Davis Reynolds. The show's second adventure, The Tomb of Havoc, was created by Carpenter and director Michael Fell with additional writing by Conner Marx.

The production opened off-Broadway at Stage 42 in May 2024 and closed in May 2025. It ran in the studio venue at Sydney Opera House from December 2024 to April 2025. The U.S. national tour began in July 2025.

== Premise ==
Dungeons & Dragons: The Twenty-Sided Tavern is set in the Forgotten Realms, an official Dungeons & Dragons campaign setting. The show combines actual play, improv, and immersive theater with the Dungeon Master, supported by the Tavern Keeper, running an adventure for the player characters. The player characters consist of various archetypes. The audience selects different versions of these characters "from a shortlist pulled from 33 total characters designed for the show". The adventure outcome is impacted by audience voting, improv by the onstage performers, and Dungeons & Dragons game mechanics.

== Production ==
Dungeons & Dragons: The Twenty-Sided Tavern is the first licensed Dungeons & Dragons theatrical production. The show was created by David Carpenter, David Andrew Laws (also known as DAGL) and Sarah Davis Reynolds. It utilizes Gamiotics software for audience participation. Reynolds explained that the split between the Dungeon Master and the Tavern Keeper puts one "in charge of the story" and the other "in charge of the game". She also commented that it allows the Dungeon Master "to be playfully antagonistic" while "the Tavern Keeper can come in and" state the exact mechanics, adding that "puppy dog eyes" will not change the game rules.

Both the New York City and Sydney productions were directed by Michael Fell. The first adventure, Carriers of Chaos, was created by Carpenter, Laws, and Reynolds. The second adventure, The Tomb of Havoc, was created by Carpenter and Fell with additional writing by Conner Marx.

=== Development ===
The Twenty-Sided Tavern was first performed at the Philadelphia Fringe Festival in 2021, prior to a run Off-Off-Broadway at Asylum NYC. At the time, it was marketed as a "Dungeons and Dragons-style" production, due to lacking an official license. Reynolds explained that during the COVID-19 pandemic, as a game designer with DAGL as a writer, they worked on "Zoom shows" that utilized "interactive technology to be a little bit more engaging than watching another Shakespeare reading on Zoom". They also requested that one of these shows feature Dungeons & Dragons, as both of them were long-time players of the game, and the concept "immediately clicked". From there, they "started doing development in front of an audience at the Philadelphia Fringe Festival" followed by "a lot of development here in New York". The full production premiered at the Pittsburgh Civic Light Opera in 2022, followed by runs in Chicago and at Edinburgh Festival Fringe.

It then became an official production by Hasbro, Curious Hedgehog, Showpath Entertainment, and Wizards of the Coast. Brisbane Times explained that the show's "earliest iteration was unlicensed, and was unable to tap into the game's cultural and geographical references", however, the deal with Hasbro "means the script, such as it is, is peppered with namechecks like Waterdeep, Baldur's Gate and the Sword Coast". In May 2024, after previews began in April, the off-Broadway show opened as Dungeons & Dragons: The Twenty-Sided Tavern at Stage 42 with a new adventure; it closed on May 11, 2025. In December 2024, the show opened at the Sydney Opera House, in the Studio venue, with a local cast under the direction of Michael Fell; it closed on April 6, 2025. The U.S. national tour began in July 2025.

=== Set design ===
The set features a tavern bar which hides various monitors and other technical controls for the Tavern Keeper and Dungeon Master to use during the show. This includes a "script monitor with pages of potential beats to follow" as a guide and a "sequence chart" monitor with "a branching list of possible scenarios that can play out dependent on each decision or dice roll". Christopher Cruz of Rolling Stone explained that "what begins with a simple flowchart rapidly expands as the game progresses" and becomes "a dizzying web of hundreds of potential outcomes for the narrative". In addition to the physical set, there is a video wall which provides various backgrounds and overlays along with character and item cards. The Tavern Keeper and Dungeon Master can use this wall to depict the adventure and include dynamic information such as "hit point meters and visualizations of the combat effects onscreen".

== Original casts ==
| Character | Original Off-Broadway Cast | Original Sydney Cast | U.S. National Tour Cast |
|---|---|---|---|
| Dungeon Master | David Andrew Laws | William Kasper | Conner Marx |
| Tavern Keeper | Sarah Davis Reynolds | Zoë Harlen | Alex Stompoly |
| The Warrior | Tyler Nowell Felix | Atlas Adams | Madelyn Murphy |
| The Mage | Madelyn Murphy | Trubie-Dylan Smith | RJ Christian |
| The Trickster | Diego F. Salinas | Eleanor Stankiewicz | Will Champion |

=== Guest stars ===
The Off-Broadway show rotated in various guest stars as players: Felicia Day (September 2024), Aabria Iyengar (September–October 2024, and February-March 2025), Travis McElroy (November 2024 and March 2025), Erika Ishii (December 2024), Jack Lepiarz (January 2025), Neil Newbon (February 2025), Darin De Paul (March 2025), and Anjali Bhimani (April 2025). Iyengar was also the show's first guest Dungeon Master. During the national tour, Bhimani, Iyengar, and Ishii, as well as Damien Haas (September 2025), were guest stars in Chicago.

== Critical reception ==
=== Chicago (2022) ===
Catey Sullivan of the Chicago Sun-Times said that Tavern "could work as a brief comedy sketch or an improv class warmup [but] cannot sustain a two-hour show". Rating the production one star of four, she described it as "a series of repetitive, one-note jokes told by one-dimensional characters, interspersed with meaningless audience interaction that ultimately adds up to a nothing-burger of a plot salad".

=== Off-Broadway (2024–2025) ===
Professional ratings
Review scores
| Source | Rating |
|---|---|
| Time Out | 4/5 stars |
| IGN | 6/10 |

Elisabeth Vincentelli of The New York Times noted that the off-Broadway show is not a "straightforward fantasy tale" as it "is basically a play session" of Dungeons & Dragons where "three actors try to pull off a mission by reacting to prompts, solving riddles and, naturally, engaging in fights"; however, she did not feel that was a "restrictive" format since Dungeons & Dragons "has been undergoing a startling renaissance". Shaye Weaver of Time Out wrote that the audience does not "need to have played D&D to enjoy or understand the show" but Dungeons & Dragons fans would "get a kick out of the gamer tropes peppered throughout the show and the Easter eggs that scenic designer K.C. McGeorge has built into his set". Vincentelli commented that "as with the tabletop version, the show relies heavily on a combination of scripted shenanigans, chance (those dice rolls!) and improvisation – getting into the plot details of the mission I saw makes little sense here as each performance is different". Weaver highlighted that the show "puts the audience in control of where the story goes" leading to different performances and that the three player characters are each "controlled by a third of the audience" for "decisions" and "support at critical junctures". Joey Sims, for IGN, noted that audience participation – such as "Mario Party-esque fast-tap challenges" – is "strictly volunteer-only basis" and that the "browser-based voting software, designed by Gamiotics, is smoothly integrated and thankfully bug-free". Sims opined that the show "coasts on creative design, strong performances, and stimulating crowd work for most of its running time" but that it "forgets" the "key element of both a great D&D game (and great theater): a meaningful story" which left him "feeling ultimately unsatisfied".

On the improv aspect of the show, Vincentelli thought "the lively, quick-thinking [Madelyn] Murphy clearly stood out, but all four actors threw themselves into the ambient silliness". Weaver similarly highlighted Murphy as "a standout among the talented improvisers". However, she thought DAGL, as the Dungeon Master, "was perhaps the best of them all—reacting quickly and humorously to the crowd's crazy decisions and call-outs, with new character voices at the ready to go along with whatever disheveled wig he may have on his head at any given moment. He was adept at keeping the crowd in line and on task while also making it feel like we were all in it together—the mark of a good DM". Sims stated DAGL was both an "endearing guide" and a "commanding storyteller", Reynolds was "enjoyably wry" and a "grounding presence" as the Tavern Keeper, and the players "are charming and likable". However, he felt that "energy tends to dip during the actual gameplay" and "without enough reasons to invest in the characters or the outcome of their quest, these portions of The Twenty-Sided Tavern suffer further".

=== Sydney (2024–2025) ===
Professional ratings
Review scores
| Source | Rating |
|---|---|
| The Guardian | 4/5 stars |
| The Sydney Morning Herald | 4/5 stars |
| Time Out | 5/5 stars |

Cassie Tongue of The Guardian called The Twenty-Sided Tavern a "perfect summer activity" with an "all-are-welcome-here vibe". Alice Ellis of Time Out explained that no "prior knowledge of D&D" is required "to get swept up in the magic that is Dungeons and Dragons The Twenty-Sided Tavern. If anything, this show is probably the best way I've found so far to get a better grasp on the complex game that is D&D". Michael Idato of The Sydney Morning Herald stated that "this isn't just watching people play the Dungeons & Dragons game, though there is dice-rolling, nail-biting thrills and gasps galore. It's more akin to an improv comedy show in which the cast play D&D character archetypes, the outcomes are decided by dice roll (and audience intervention), and the cast share the stage with a 'dungeon master' (William Kasper) and a 'rules lawyer' Zoe Harlen". Ellis called Kasper "charismatic" and that the player actors "are likeable, funny and sharp". In particular, Ellis commented that Eleanor Stankiewicz "commands the stage, holding the audience's gaze even at times when she's not the focal point". Tongue thought Harlen "delightfully performed" as the Tavern Keeper.

Tongue stated that the show is "an uncomplicated and boisterous good time that isn't afraid to be silly" and that "the options are too wonderfully ridiculous to be spoiled but expect big choices, dubious accents and charmingly lo-fi props". Tongue highlighted that the Dungeon Master and Tavern Keeper "grant the audience, at critical moments, chances choose our own unique adventure with the press of a button" with the Tavern Keeper taking "on some of the rules-explaining and game-running of a traditional Dungeon Master". Idato noted that The Twenty-Sided Tavern is "very much for the mainstream, though there are small details to tickle the hardcore fans", and called it an "unpredictable hoot" and "delightfully bonkers" with "some curious creative notes". Ellis stated that she had "never seen anything like" The Twenty-Sided Tavern and that "the magic of this show" comes from the "unexpectedness and chaos of dice play". Ellis also highlighted other aspects that made the show a "very immersive experience" such as "amazing digital artwork displays of the buildings or landscapes the characters were in" and "changing lighting and runes that lit up around the stage when characters perform certain actions".
