= Jorus =

Jorus may refer to:

- Jorus C'Baoth, a Star Wars Legends character
- Jorus Azuremantle, a character in the Silver Marches supplement to Dungeons & Dragons
