= Jason Carl =

Game designer

- Occupations: Game designer, brand manager
- Known for: Game design on Dungeons & Dragons and World of Darkness

Jason Carl is a game designer who has worked on a number of roleplaying games for companies such as White Wolf, TSR and Wizards of the Coast, Kenzer & Company, and Exile Game Studio. He is the former Brand Marketing Manager of Paradox Interactive's World of Darkness property.

== Career ==
Carl recalls his introduction to role-playing games: "Some junior high buddies back in my home state of Maine first introduced me to roleplaying in 1980... we played Keep on the Borderlands. From that moment on, I was totally and irreversibly hooked." Years later, he began doing freelance design for White Wolf Publishing and Dungeon magazine.

=== Wizards of the Coast ===
After working as the Policy Director for Organized Play for the Magic: The Gathering game, Carl became a member of the Wizards of the Coast R&D team, designing adventures and modules for the Dungeons & Dragons game: "Both careers have their rewards... but I've wanted to be involved in RPG design since I was fourteen - after all, I still remember rolling my first d20. So I couldn't pass up the opportunity to make the switch." When the D&D third edition was released in 2000, Carl was the designer chosen to begin the process of adding detail to the character classes in the supplement Sword and Fist (2001); he felt that this book "is important because it establishes the model for those that will follow it".

=== World of Darkness ===
Carl was the CEO of By Night Studios from 2010 to 2018; By Night Studios is the official licensed publisher of new Mind's Eye Theatre products for White Wolf’s World of Darkness setting. In 2019, he transitioned to the publisher's advisory board.

In early 2018, Carl was a game producer on the 5th edition of Vampire: The Masquerade (part of the World of Darkness series), and an "executive vice president of community" at White Wolf, a subsidiary of Paradox Interactive. Later in 2018, Paradox dissolved White Wolf as an independent entity. In 2019, the 5th edition of Vampire: The Masquerade won the Origins Award for Best Roleplaying Game of the Year and won the Origins Fan Favorite Award.

From 2019 to 2025, Carl was the Brand Marketing Manager of Paradox's World of Darkness. He was also the storyteller of multiple canon World of Darkness actual play web series including L.A. by Night (2018), Seattle by Night (2019), and L.A. by Night's sequel NY by Night (2022). Em Friedman, for Polygon, stated that L.A. by Night "survived Geek & Sundry's decline [...] in no small part to the masterful work of storyteller and series creator Jason Carl". On NY by Night, Friedman commented that "Carl has a deft hand for scene-setting, creating lyric love letters to real-world locations both famous and obscure" and that "Carl and the players have always been innovators, working toward high production values, costuming, and even creating prerecorded interstitial scenes".

=== 2025–present ===
In December 2025, Carl left Paradox and joined Tabletop Vacations as the dean of its Dungeon Master University program. Tabletop Vacations are the creators of the tabletop gaming retreat program D&D in a Castle. In May 2026, Carl is scheduled to appear as a special guest at Darkness Emergent: Los Angeles, a World of Darkness themed LARP event from By Night Studios.

== Works ==
Dungeons & Dragons 2nd edition

- The Apocalypse Stone (2000)
- The Dungeon of Death (2000)

Dungeons & Dragons 3rd edition

- Player's Handbook (2000)
- Monster Manual (2000)
- Dungeon Master's Guide (2000)
- Dungeons & Dragons Adventure Game (2000)
- Lords of Darkness (2001)
- Magic of Faerûn (2001)
- Sword and Fist (2001)
- Diablo II: To Hell Back (2001)
- Silver Marches (2002)
- Kingdoms of Kalamar Player's Guide (2002)

Dungeons & Dragons 3.5 edition

- Monster Manual (2003)
- Races of Faerûn (2003)

Exile Game Studio

- Hollow Earth Expedition (2006)
- Mysteries of the Hollow Earth (2009)

World of Darkness

- Liege, Lord and Lackey (1997)
- Laws of Elysium (1998)
- Laws of the Night Revised (1999)
- Laws of the Hunt Revised Edition (2002)
- Mind's Eye Theater: Vampire The Masquerade (2013)
- Mind's Eye Theatre: Blood & Betrayal (2013)
- Mind's Eye Theatre: Vampire The Masquerade Storyteller Secrets (2014)
- Mind's Eye Theatre: Pickering Lythe (2015)
- Mind's Eye Theatre: Werewolf The Apocalypse (2016)
- Vampire: The Masquerade 5th edition (2018)
