= Erika Ishii =

American voice actor (born 1987)

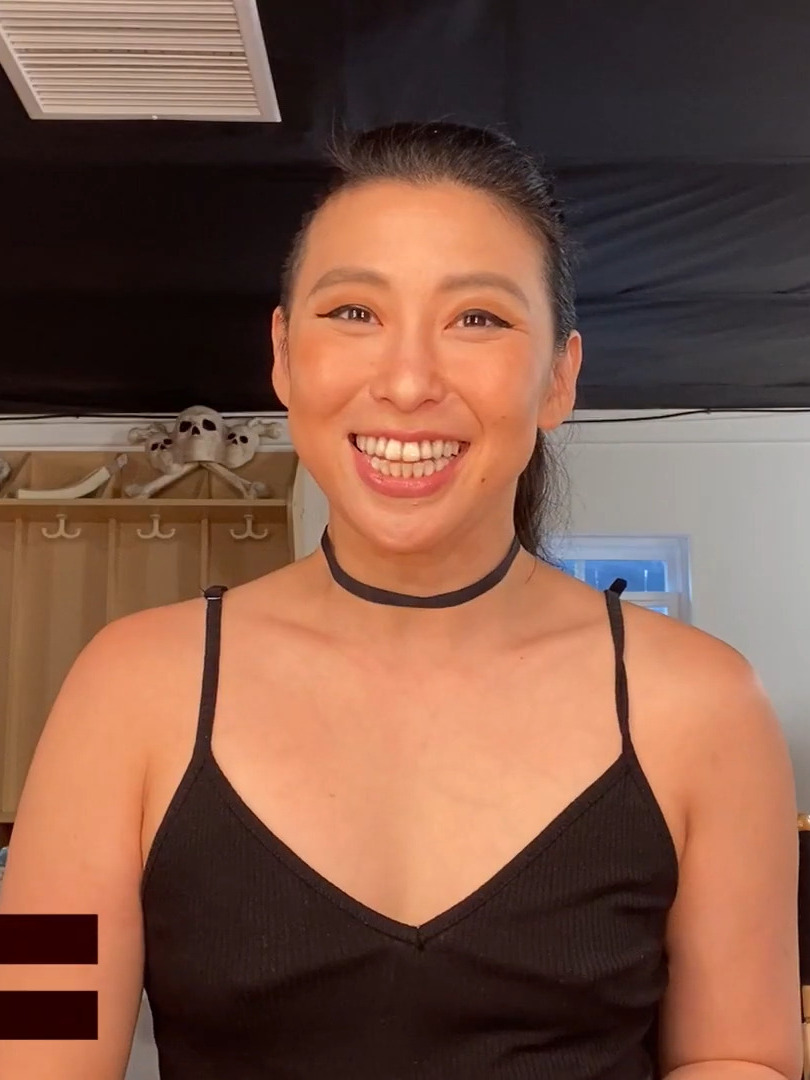
- Ishii in 2021
- Born: March 7, 1987 (age 39)
- Occupations: Voice actor, host
- Years active: 1992–present
- Relatives: Adena Ishii (sister)

Erika Mari Ishii (ee-shee-EE; born March 7, 1987) is an American voice actor and host. They (Note: Ishii uses all personal pronouns. This article uses the singular they for consistency.) are best known as the voice of video game characters such as Valkyrie in Apex Legends (2019) and Atsu in Ghost of Yōtei (2025), as well as for their appearances in actual play web series including L.A. by Night and Dimension 20.

== Career ==
Ishii's work in acting started at a young age, with a guest appearance on Full House.

=== Voice acting ===
In an interview with Bungie, Ishii stated that playing The Last of Us (2013) inspired them to enter voice acting in video games. From the late 2010s, Ishii performed voice roles in numerous video games, including The Last of Us Part II in 2020. During their early career, Ishii was advised to conceal their sexuality and political views to avoid losing work. Later they became more open about their orientation and identity. Ishii indicated that doing so was a positive step, as it allowed them to be part of a community, and to take on relevant roles. "The industry is beginning to recognize the value of authenticity and inclusion. It makes for better art and it's what the majority of the world wants to see." Ishii spoke positively about their role as the mixed-Japanese lesbian character Valkyrie in Apex Legends, stating that "None of it was tokenism ... She's one of the most real characters I've ever had the honour of portraying."

Ishii was a narrator for the audiobook Walk Among Us (2020), "an audio-first trio of horror novellas set in Vampire: The Masquerade's World of Darkness". In September 2021, Ishii was a featured artist on the acoustic version of the song "Can You Feel My Love" by the music group Juniper Vale.

In 2024, they were one of the voice actors for the lead character Rook in Dragon Age: The Veilguard. Ishii won "Best LGBTQ+ Voice Actor of the Year" at the 2025 Gayming Awards; additionally, Rook won "Best LGBTQ+ Character". In 2025, they were the lead character Atsu in Ghost of Yōtei, the sequel to Ghost of Tsushima.

=== Actual play ===
Ishii is known for their roles in actual play role-playing web shows such as L.A. by Night and Dimension 20. In January 2023, it was announced that Ishii, with Brennan Lee Mulligan, Aabria Iyengar, and Lou Wilson, would star in the creator-owned actual play podcast Worlds Beyond Number; the show premiered in March 2023.

In December 2024, Ishii guest starred in the stage production of Dungeons & Dragons: The Twenty-Sided Tavern which combines actual play, improv, and immersive theater at Stage 42 in New York City. They later guest starred in the production's national tour in Chicago in September 2025. In May 2026, Ishii reprised their role as Annabelle from L.A. by Night at Darkness Emergent: Los Angeles, a World of Darkness themed LARP event from By Night Studios. At San Diego Comic-Con 2026, Dark Horse Comics announced a new ongoing series titled Dungeons & Dragons. Issues will feature back matter by "RPG personalities"; Ishii will contribute an essay for the first issue which is scheduled to be released in November 2026.

=== Hosting ===
Ishii was a host and producer for Geek & Sundry. They have also hosted other events such as the 2018 Crunchyroll Anime Awards and the 2021 Acceleration Japan showcase.

== Personal life ==
Ishii was born to Christopher S. Ishii and Carolyn Abe-Ishii, who both worked in the film industry. Their grandfather Chris K. Ishii was a Walt Disney Company animator. Ishii has two siblings, including Berkeley, California Mayor Adena Ishii. Ishii and their family are of Japanese descent.

Ishii identifies as queer, bisexual, or pansexual with no preference between labels, and genderfluid. They have been vocal in their opposition to transphobia, and have raised funds for LGBTQ supporting charities such as The Trevor Project.

== Awards and nominations ==
| Year | Award | Category | Work | Result | Ref. |
|---|---|---|---|---|---|
| 2024 | Gayming Awards | Best LGBTQ+ Voice Actor of the Year | Dragon Age: The Veilguard | Won | |
| 2024 | Gayming Awards | Best LGBTQ+ Character | Dragon Age: The Veilguard | Won | |
| 2025 | Golden Joystick Awards | Best Lead Performer | Ghost of Yōtei | Nominated | |
| 2025 | The Game Awards | Best Performance | Ghost of Yōtei | Nominated | |
| 2026 | D.I.C.E. Awards | Outstanding Achievement in Character | Ghost of Yōtei | Won | |
| 2026 | BAFTA Games Awards | Performer in a Leading Role | Ghost of Yōtei | Nominated | |

== Acting credits ==
=== Film ===
| Year | Title | Role(s) | Notes | Source |
|---|---|---|---|---|
| 2018 | Mobile Suit Gundam Narrative | Michelle Luio | Voice | |
| 2018 | Big Fish & Begonia | Tingmu's Mom, Leizu | Voice; English dub | |
| 2021 | And Then | Mana | Short film | |
| 2021 | Pretty Guardian Sailor Moon Eternal | JunJun / Sailor Juno | Voice | |
| 2023 | Dragonfly | Miyoko | Voice, short film | |
| 2024 | Justice League: Crisis on Infinite Earths | Kimiyo Hoshi / Doctor Light, Helena Wayne / Huntress of Earth-Two | Voice; direct-to-video | |
| 2024 | Pretty Guardian Sailor Moon Cosmos | JunJun / Sailor Juno | Voice | |
| 2025 | The Traveler & The Troll | The Traveler | Short film | |
| 2026 | The Last Fifteen Minutes | Kaiju | Voice, short film | |

=== Television ===
| Year | Title | Role(s) | Notes | Source |
|---|---|---|---|---|
| 1992 | Full House | "Pocahontas" | Season 6, episode 8: "The Play's the Thing" | |
| 2021 | Shaman King | Ludsev | Voice | |
| 2021–2022 | Young Justice | Child, Mary Bromfield / Sergeant Marvel | Season 4 | |
| 2022 | The Mighty Ones | Lindsay | 10 episodes | |
| 2022 | Oddballs | Jenna / Liv | | |
| 2023 | Strange Planet | New Friend / Hottie #2 / Customer | Season 1, episode 7: "Adolescent Limbshake" | |
| 2024 | Moon Girl and Devil Dinosaur | Michiko Musashi / Turbo | Season 2, episode 14: "Family Matters" | |
| 2024 | Zombies: The Re-Animated Series | Harely | Season 1, episode 6: "Youngins & Dragons" | |
| 2025 | Pokémon Horizons – The Search for Laqua | Rika | | |
| 2026 | X-Men '97 | Yuriko Oyama / Lady Deathstrike | Season 2, episode 5: "Weapon X, Lies and DVDs" | |
| 2026 | Avatar: Seven Havens | Various voices | | |

=== Video games ===
| Year | Title | Voice role(s) | Notes | Source |
|---|---|---|---|---|
| 2017 | Crypt of the NecroDancer: Amplified | | | |
| 2017 | Master X Master | six characters | | |
| 2017 | Dream Daddy: A Dad Dating Simulator | Amanda | | |
| 2017 | Battlestar Galactica: Deadlock | | | |
| 2017 | Fire Emblem Heroes | Loki | | |
| 2018 | Sprint Vector | Kai | | |
| 2018 | Monster Prom | Valerie | | |
| 2018 | Shining Resonance Refrain | Beatrice | English version | |
| 2018 | Maple Story 2 | Additional voices | English version | |
| 2018 | Fallout 76 | Cindy Holloway, Chelsea | | |
| 2019 | Vacation Simulator | Vacation Bot | | |
| 2019 | Shenmue III | Additional voices | | |
| 2019 | Shantae and the Seven Sirens | Zapple | | |
| 2019 | River City Girls | Martha | | |
| 2019 | Daemon X Machina | Rigid | | |
| 2019 | Code Vein | Female player character voice 1 | | |
| 2020 | Final Fantasy VII Remake | Additional voices | | |
| 2020 | The Last of Us Part II | Additional voices | | |
| 2020 | Rogue Company | Ronin | | |
| 2020 | Marvel's Avengers | Maddy Cho, AIM PA | | |
| 2020 | Destiny 2 | Ana Bray, Kridis | Added in 2020 update | |
| 2020 | Fortnite | Radio DJ, Ghost Pistol, Mari | | |
| 2020 | World of Warcraft: Shadowlands | Domina Venomblade | | |
| 2020 | Call of Duty: Black Ops Cold War | Kaori "Kitsune" Tanaka | | |
| 2020 | Cyberpunk 2077 | Ruth Dzeng, Red Menace | | |
| 2021 | Cookie Run: Kingdom | Angel Cookie | | |
| 2021 | The Big Con | Ali | | |
| 2021 | Apex Legends | Valkyrie | Added in 2021 update | |
| 2021 | Psychonauts 2 | HQ Maintenance Brianne | | |
| 2021 | Deathloop | Dr. Wenjie Evans | | |
| 2021 | Halo Infinite | LUMU/Teardrop | | |
| 2022 | Rune Factory 5 | Misasagi | English version | |
| 2022 | We Are OFK | Various voices | | |
| 2022 | Guild Wars 2: End of Dragons | Yu Joon | | |
| 2022 | Wylde Flowers | Kim | | |
| 2023 | Crash Team Rumble | Catbat | | |
| 2023 | Stray Gods: The Roleplaying Musical | Hermes | | |
| 2023 | Call of Duty: Modern Warfare III | Captain Amy Fang | Zombies mode | |
| 2024 | Suicide Squad: Kill The Justice League | Mrs. Freeze/Victoria Frias | "Season of Freeze" Update | |
| 2024 | Dragon Age: The Veilguard | Rook | | |
| 2024 | Mortal Kombat 1 | Sektor | "Khaos Reigns" expansion | |
| 2025 | Rift of the NecroDancer | Nocturna | | |
| 2025 | MindsEye | Lin Xiao Fei | | |
| 2025 | Date Everything! | Ben-hwa | | |
| 2025 | Ghost of Yōtei | Atsu | | |

=== Web series ===
| Year | Title | Role(s) | Notes | Source |
|---|---|---|---|---|
| 2015 | Extra Life D&D with Saving Throw Show | Penelope Lightfoot | A charity-fueled liveplay produced by Saving Throw Show. | |
| 2016 | Natural 20 | Garmungus | Actual play web series produced by Transplant Films | |
| 2016–2019 | Game Engine | Host | Gaming web series by Geek & Sundry | |
| 2017 | Sagas of Sundry: Madness | Selina Tsukiyama | Cast member; RPG web limited series by Geek & Sundry | |
| 2017 | Starcade Marathon | Host | Web special by Geek & Sundry | |
| 2017 | Vast | Kraya Yikjaal Gorumon | Episode: "The Great Experiment - Part 1 & 2"; actual play web series by Geek & Sundry | |
| 2017–2018 | ForeverVerse | | Actual play web series by Geek & Sundry | |
| 2018 | A Magic Moment with Joseph Gordon-Levitt | Host | Web special by Geek & Sundry | |
| 2018 | The Neon Noir | Shirley Kent | Audio drama podcast created by Jack Delaney | |
| 2018–2021 | L.A. by Night | Annabelle | Cast member; actual play web series based on Vampire: The Masquerade | |
| 2019 | Dimension 20: Escape from the Bloodkeep | Lilith | Cast member; actual play web limited series based on Dungeons & Dragons | |
| 2019 | Into Carnival Row | Moonshadow Foxglove | Cast member; actual play web limited series by Nerdist based on Carnival Row | |
| 2019 | Pub Draw | Themself | Episode: "Drawing Hana with Erika Ishii" | |
| 2019–2020 | Critical Role (one-shots) | Hanako Hayashi | Episode: "Call of Cthulhu: Shadow of the Crystal Palace" | |
| 2019–2020 | Critical Role (one-shots) | Sasha Murasaki | Episode: "Cinderbrush: A Monsterhearts Story" | |
| 2020 | The Calyx | Winter Solstice | Episode: "Saturnine Chalice - Part 1 & 2"; actual play web series by Good Time Society | |
| 2021, 2024 | Dimension 20: Misfits and Magic | Dream (a.k.a. K Keiko Tanaka) | Cast member; actual play web limited series based on the Kids on Brooms role-playing system | |
| 2021 | Dimension 20: The Seven | Danielle Barkstock | Cast member; actual play web limited series based on Dungeons & Dragons | |
| 2021 | The Auction with Becca Scott | | Actual play web special by Good Time Society based on Call of Cthulhu | |
| 2021 | Battle for Beyond | Leila | Cast member; Actual play web limited series by D&D Beyond based on Dungeons & Dragons | |
| 2022 | Critical Role (campaign 3) | Yu Suffiad | Guest star, 6 episodes; actual play web series by Critical Role Productions | |
| 2022 | Dimension 20: Coffin Run | May Wong | Cast member; actual play web limited series based on Dungeons & Dragons | |
| 2022 | The Adventure Zone: Dust | Louise "Lulu" Kagiyama | Season 2; actual play web series by The McElroy Family | |
| 2022 | NY by Night | Annabelle | Episode: "Avoided and Exploited" | |
| 2022–present | Game Changer | Themself | Guest star, 5 episodes; comedy game show by Dropout | |
| 2022–present | Dirty Laundry | Themself | Guest star, 2 episodes; comedy game show by Dropout | |
| 2023 | Make Some Noise | Themself | Episode: "The Wicked Switch of the West" | |
| 2023 | Dimension 20: Burrow's End | Ava | Cast member; 10 episodes | |
| 2023–present | Worlds Beyond Number | Ame | Cast member; creator-owned actual play podcast | |
| 2024 | The Adventure Zone: Abnimals | JJ August | Episode: "Bunny Heist!" | |

=== Stage ===
| Year | Title | Role | Venue | Ref. |
|---|---|---|---|---|
| 2024 | Dungeons & Dragons: The Twenty-Sided Tavern | Warrior | Stage 42 | |
| 2025 | Dungeons & Dragons: The Twenty-Sided Tavern | Might | Broadway Playhouse at Water Tower Place | |
