= The Dungeon of Death =

Dungeons & Dragons adventure module

- Authors: Jason Carl
- First published: 2000

The Dungeon of Death is an adventure module for the 2nd edition of the Advanced Dungeons & Dragons fantasy role-playing game.

== Plot summary ==
The Dungeon of Death is part of the "Dungeon Crawl" series, which provides stand-alone adventures reminiscent of the old style of dungeon adventure. While the adventures in this series are set in the Forgotten Realms, they are designed to be easy to place in other campaigns with minimal effort.

The Dungeon of Death has a connection to the events depicted in the Hellgate Keep scenario. The plot involves a mining complex abandoned by the dwarves, and taken over long ago by evil inhabitants who are now attempting to lure the player characters into the complex.

== Publication history ==
The Dungeon of Death was published by Wizards of the Coast in May 2000 and written by Jason Carl.

== Reception ==
The Dungeon of Death was reviewed by the online version of Pyramid on June 23, 2000. The reviewer felt that the adventure "easily stands on its [own]" despite its loose connection to Hellgate Keep. The reviewer felt that the production value was "very good, like most of the recent Wizard releases. Where other companies of late seem to be using larger typefaces and bigger margins, Wizards has moved in the opposite direction, allowing them to put more information into smaller books while keeping the price down. The maps are clean and easy to read, the text is well-edited with no glaring typos, and the few pieces of art are relevant to the story and not mere filler." The reviewer added that while the plot is "nothing terribly new or inventive, it works as a default motivation".

== Reviews ==
- Envoyer (German) (Issue 46 - Aug 2000)
