= L.A. by Night =

American web series

- Genre: Horror; Urban fantasy; Actual play
- Based on: Vampire: The Masquerade 5th edition
- Starring: Jason Carl; Alexander Ward; Cynthia Marie; B. Dave Walters; Erika Ishii; Xander Jeanneret; Josephine McAdam
- Country of origin: United States
- Original language: English
- No. of seasons: 5
- No. of episodes: 63

Production
- Production locations: Los Angeles, California
- Production companies: Geek & Sundry (2018–19); Paradox Interactive (2020–21)

Original release
- Network: Twitch; YouTube; Alpha (2018–19)
- Release: September 14, 2018 – October 29, 2021

Related
- Vampire: The Masquerade – Bloodlines; NY by Night (2022); Seattle by Night (2019); Vein Pursuit (2020)

L.A. by Night is an American actual play web series where the cast plays as vampires using the fifth edition Vampire: The Masquerade ruleset. It is set canonically in the World of Darkness series after the events of Vampire: The Masquerade – Bloodlines and focuses on Kindred society in Los Angeles. It premiered in September 2018; the show's current storyline concluded with its fifth season in 2021. A sequel series, titled NY by Night, started in July 2022.

== Cast ==
=== Main ===
- Jason Carl as the storyteller
- Alexander Ward as Jasper
- Cynthia Marie as Nelli G.
- B. Dave Walters as Victor Temple
- Erika Ishii as Annabelle
- Xander Jeanneret as X
- Josephine McAdam as Eva

=== Guest ===
- Mark Meer as Chaz Price
- Taliesin Jaffe as Carver
- Bex Taylor-Klaus as Ramona
- Ash Minnick as Fiona
- Satine Phoenix as Miranda
- Jason C. Miller as Strikes a Chord
- Jessica Chobot as Victoria Ash
- Kelly Lynne D'Angelo as Diane
- Becca Scott as Chloe Hudson
- Vincent Caso as Gregory Demetrios
- Noura Ibrahim as Ib
- Marisha Ray as Ellenore
- Hector Navarro as Juan
- Whitney Moore as Baron Therese Voerman and Jeanette Voerman
- Luis Carazo as Nines Rodriguez
- Amelia Rose Blaire as Suzanne Rochelle
- Bryan Dechart as Vannevar Thomas
- Trisha Hershberger as Kasey
- Ladee Danger as Sycorax
- Amy Dallen as Sarah
- Stefanie Woodburn as Maggie
- Aliza Pearl as Chelsea
- Amy Vorphal as Amethyst
- Josh Dempster as Mark
- Ivan Van Norman as Robert Garrick
- Shayne Eastin as Katya
- Juliet Landau as Hester
- Faye Mata as Kyoko
- Kendra Vaughan as Violet Luna
- Mica Burton as Delilah
- Brennan Lee Mulligan as Adrian Clairmont
- Matthew Mercer as Cuthbert Beckett
- Alex Frew as Agent Handler
- Bryan Forrest as Agent Stillwater

== Premise ==
L.A. by Night is a sequel to Vampire: The Masquerade – Bloodlines and deals with the fallout from the game for Kindred society in Los Angeles, however, the events of the show center on a different group of characters. The show focuses on an Anarch coterie when a vampire fledgling, Annabelle, joins the group. Victor and Nelli attempt "to establish baronies of their own while fending off human Hunters and the Second Inquisition". Success then places "the coterie in the path of the Camarilla. That meant having to ensure their ties to fellow barons around L.A. were solid enough that an Anarch revolt could stand a chance, only none of it turned out the way anyone expected. Matters were complicated, not just by the political squabbles in L.A. itself, but by greater events such as the Beckoning".

== Production ==
L.A. by Night debuted as a production of Geek & Sundry in September 2018, with the company ultimately producing the first three seasons. These remain available on Geek & Sundry's YouTube channel. The company, then approximately at its peak in terms of Twitch subscriptions and viewership, launched several shows under a "Nerdoween" moniker for Halloween 2018, including L.A. by Night. The show was in part intended to promote Legendary Digital Networks' streaming platform Alpha, premiering there as well as on Geek & Sundry's Twitch channel. The first three seasons featured many guest characters portrayed primarily by actors from other LDN shows- including Marisha Ray and Taliesin Jaffe of Critical Role, Jessica Chobot and Hector Navarro of Mothership, and Jason C. Miller of Starter Kit.

Alpha would shut down in the wake of Critical Role's 2019 departure from the service, with the closure taking effect on March 31. This occurred only six days before the finale of L.A. by Night's second season was due to air, with the final epilogue Dark Hallways instead broadcasting on Twitch exclusively on April 5. In June, Geek & Sundry adapted the first two seasons of the show as a podcast for distribution via Spotify. The podcast also included a special that had been recorded live at Wondercon, set in between the second and third season. The third season aired on Twitch from June until September that year.

With Geek & Sundry in decline and facing major layoffs in 2020, production of the show was taken over by Paradox Interactive (owner of World of Darkness intellectual property such as Vampire: The Masquerade). Seasons 4 and 5 aired "exclusively on the World of Darkness Twitch channel" before being added to the official World of Darkness YouTube channel as VOD. Xander Jeanneret and Josephine McAdam joined the main cast for seasons 4 and 5. In August 2021, it was announced that the fifth season would conclude the current storyline of the show. Jason Carl, Brand Marketing Manager for World of Darkness and Storyteller for the show, stated that season 5 "is not the end of L.A. By Night". In June 2022, World of Darkness announced that Carl is the Storyteller of a sequel series, titled NY by Night, which is scheduled to premiere on July 1, 2022.

== Episodes ==
=== Series overview ===
Season	Production	Episodes	Originally released		
Season	Production	Episodes	First released	Last released	Network
1	Geek & Sundry	12	September 14, 2018	December 21, 2018	Twitch, YouTube, Alpha, Spotify
2	Geek & Sundry	13	January 11, 2019	April 5, 2019	Twitch, YouTube, Alpha, Spotify
S	Geek & Sundry	1	June 28, 2019		Spotify
3	Geek & Sundry	15	June 1, 2019	September 13, 2019	Twitch, YouTube
4	Paradox; Interactive	13	January 31, 2020	April 24, 2020	Twitch, YouTube
5	Paradox; Interactive	9	September 3, 2021	October 29, 2021	Twitch, YouTube

=== Season 1 ===
Episode	Title	Original release date	Notes
1	"Mortal Stakes"	September 14, 2018	–
2	"Instruments of Darkness"	September 21, 2018	Mark Meer guest stars
3	"Fear No Monsters"	September 28, 2018	Xander Jeanneret guest stars
4	"Happy Families"	October 5, 2018	Xander Jeanneret guest stars
5	"What I Am"	October 12, 2018	Taliesin Jaffe and Bex Taylor-Klaus guest star
6	"Immortal Longings"	October 19, 2018	Ash Minnick and Satine Phoenix guest star
7	"Tooth And Claw"	October 26, 2018	Jason Charles Miller guest stars
8	"Who Can You Trust?"	November 2, 2018	Jessica Chobot guest stars
Epilogues
9	"Keep Us Apart"	November 30, 2018	Kelly Lynne D'Angelo, Xander Jeanneret, and Becca Scott guest star
10	"Black Magic"	December 7, 2018	Vince Caso guest stars
11	"Uneasy"	December 14, 2018	Noura Ibrahim and Ash Minnick guest star
12	"Find My Home"	December 21, 2018	Xander Jeanneret and Marisha Ray guest star

=== Season 2 ===
Episode	Title	Original release date	Notes
1	"Unnatural Troubles"	January 11, 2019	Xander Jeanneret and Becca Scott guest star
2	"Eye For An Eye"	January 18, 2019	Kelly Lynne D'Angelo and Hector Navarro guest star
3	"Gentle Manners"	January 25, 2019	Xander Jeanneret, Josephine McAdam and Whitney Moore guest star
4	"Teardrop"	February 1, 2019	Vince Caso, Mark Meer, and Whitney Moore guest star
5	"Duel"	February 8, 2019	Josephine McAdam, Ash Minnick and Becca Scott guest star
6	"The Warning"	February 15, 2019	Luis Carazo, Mark Meer, Ash Minnick, Whitney Moore and Satine Phoenix guest star
7	"Red Flags"	February 22, 2019	Vince Caso and Alex Frew guest star
8	"Innocent Monsters"	March 1, 2019	Amelia Rose Blaire, Luis Carazo, Bryan Dechart, Trisha Hershberger, Ladee Danger, Ash Minnick and Becca Scott guest star
9	"Embrace the Dark"	March 8, 2019	Luis Carazo, Xander Jeanneret, Trisha Hershberger, Ladee Danger, and Mark Meer guest star
Epilogues
10	"The Devil's Garden"	March 15, 2019	Amy Dallen, Xander Jeanneret and Stefanie Woodburn guest star
11	"Watch the Night"	March 22, 2019	Trisha Hershberger, Xander Jeanneret, Ladee Danger and Whitney Moore guest star
12	"Save the Darkness"	March 29, 2019	Vince Caso, Noura Ibrahim, Xander Jeanneret and Aliza Pearl guest star
13	"Dark Hallways"	April 5, 2019	Xander Jeanneret, Josephine McAdam, Ash Minnick and Becca Scott guest star. This episode did not air on Alpha due to the shutdown of the service on March 31.

=== Specials ===
Episode	Title	Original release date	Notes
1	"The Happiest Place On Earth"	June 28, 2019	This episode occurs between seasons 2 and 3. On March 30, 2019, it was filmed in front of a live audience at WonderCon and later released as a podcast. Vince Caso, Noura Ibrahim, Xander Jeanneret, Josephine McAdam, and Amy Vorphal guest star

=== Season 3 ===
Episode	Title	Original release date	Notes
1	"Dead Road"	June 1, 2019	–
2	"Love and Fear"	June 7, 2019	Josh Dempster, Alex Frew and Josephine McAdam guest star
3	"Dancing with the Devil"	June 13, 2019	Vince Caso, Alex Frew and Aliza Pearl guest star
4	"Swimming with the Sharks"	June 20, 2019	Josh Dempster, Alex Frew, Ash Minnick and Aliza Pearl guest star
5	"Play the Devil"	June 27, 2019	Amelia Rose Blaire, Bryan Dechart, Alex Frew, Noura Ibrahim, Ivan Van Norman, Ash Minnick and Whitney Moore guest star
6	"Beauty and Decay"	July 5, 2019	Amelia Rose Blaire and Bryan Dechart guest star
7	"Hollywood Ending"	July 12, 2019	Vince Caso, Bryan Dechart, Josephine McAdam and Whitney Moore guest star
8	"Blood Divides"	July 19, 2019	Trisha Hershberger and Josephine McAdam guest star
9	"Into the Night"	July 26, 2019	Josephine McAdam guest stars
Epilogues
10	"Set Me Free"	August 9, 2019	Noura Ibrahim guest stars
11	"Break the Silence"	August 16, 2019	Vince Caso guest stars
12	"Shattered Faith"	August 23, 2019	Shayne Eastin and Josephine McAdam guest star
13	"Captain of My Soul"	August 30, 2019	–
14	"Witching Time"	September 6, 2019	Juliet Landau, Faye Mata, and Kendra Vaughan guest star
15	"Silence in Heaven"	September 13, 2019	Xander Jeanneret and Becca Scott guest star

=== Season 4 ===
Episode	Title	Original release date	Notes
1	"More Than Human"	January 31, 2020	Taliesin Jaffe, Mica Burton, and Faye Mata guest star
2	"Darkness Divide"	February 7, 2020	Faye Mata and Vince Caso guest star
3	"Voice of the Dead"	February 14, 2020	Faye Mata guest stars
4	"The Darkest Places"	February 21, 2020	Luis Carazo and Joshua Dempster guest star
5	"Pressure Lines"	February 28, 2020	Shayne Eastin guest stars
6	"Hollywood Forever"	March 6, 2020	Shayne Eastin guest stars
7	"Dead Ecstasies"	March 13, 2020	Bryan Dechart, Amelia Rose Blaire, Noura Ibrahim, and Shayne Eastin guest star
8	"And All the Sinners Saint"	March 20, 2020	–
Epilogues
9	"Compelled to Injure"	March 27, 2020	Luis Carazo guest stars
10	"A Thousand Masquerades"	April 3, 2020	–
11	"In Praise of Ladies Dead"	April 10, 2020	Ash Minnick guest stars
12	"With One Wish"	April 17, 2020	Juliet Landau guest stars
13	"The Last Resort"	April 21, 2020	Taliesin Jaffe guest stars

=== Season 5 ===
Episode	Title	Original release date	Notes
1	"Tower of Glass"	September 3, 2021	Bryan Dechart, Amelia Rose Blaire, Noura Ibrahim and Shayne Eastin guest star
2	"Another Broken Heart"	September 10, 2021	Vince Caso and Aliza Pearl guest star
3	"Night Flowers"	September 17, 2021	Shayne Eastin and Becca Scott guest star
4	"Live on the Moon"	September 24, 2021	Marisha Ray, Taliesin Jaffe, and Brennan Lee Mulligan guest star
5	"Isolated"	October 1, 2021	Whitney Moore and Faye Mata guest star
6	"Cry Havoc"	October 8, 2021	Brennan Lee Mulligan and Noura Ibrahim guest star
7	"Sharpen Your Knife"	October 15, 2021	Noura Ibrahim guest stars
8	"Reign in Hell"	October 22, 2021	Mica Burton, Noura Ibrahim, Brennan Lee Mulligan and Matthew Mercer guest star
9	"Valediction"	October 29, 2021	Alex Frew guest stars

== Reception ==
Amanda Farough, VentureBeat, highlighted that L.A. by Night is an example of an actual play show sponsored by a TTRPG publisher. Farough wrote that the show "was created to give Vampire: The Masquerade and its community more visibility among a wider roleplaying audience, thanks in part to a partnership with Geek & Sundry. The publisher isn't interested in utilizing 'L.A. By Night' to drive sales, even though the show has hit over a million impressions per season between streaming and video-on-demand. Instead, World of Darkness leans into actual play shows to spread brand awareness, continue to build a global audience with players from across a spectrum of experience [...], and create positive communities that can share their experiences in safe, respectful ways".

L.A. by Night was included in TNW's "The podcasts that got us through 2020" roundup — the article states that "LA By Night is pure escapism. It's a TV show that looks like a Zoom meeting of a group of professional actors playing Vampire: The Masquerade. It's a surreal experience. If you've never played Dungeons & Dragons or other tabletop roleplaying games, it's an excellent way to see how it's done by people who are really good at doing it. But the best part is that it only takes a few minutes to get past the fact that these are actors dressed up to sit at a dinner table and roll dice while describing scenes [...]. Once you're immersed, the effect is reminiscent of old-timey radio shows where a cast of characters would react as a narrator weaved a tale of adventure, mystery, or science fiction". Tristan Greene, in a separate article for TNW, stated that L.A. by Night is his favorite part of the extended World of Darkness universe and his "favorite vampire TV show ever". Greene highlighted that the show acts as an entry point to both tabletop gaming and the World of Darkness universe. Greene wrote that the cast manages "to seamlessly explain the rules and the gameplay as they go, so it's helpful for those trying to figure what a good game of Vampire should look like. Watching an actual world of characters and intrigue get improvised into existence in front of you is a fantastic motivation for newcomers to start telling their own stories in the World of Darkness. What's more important is that it's not a brand-placement advertisement gussied up to look like a game. It's evident LA By Night is a work of passion. [...] It's the sincerity of LA By Night, that is to say the genuine glee with which its cast members play the game, that makes it special. The main cast is exquisite and the guests have done an amazing job of fleshing out the other denizens of the chronicle".

The show was also on Screen Rant's 2021 "RPG Actual Plays Like Critical Role To Check Out For Halloween" list — the article states that "as a campaign where players are the monsters, much of the horror, tension, and humor in LA By Night stems from the player characters themselves and the harsh choices they make to appease their thirst for blood, advance their status in the cutthroat politics of vampire society, and the danger they face from the vampire-hunting forces of the Second Inquisition (should they flaunt their vampire status overmuch)". Colin Kerford, in a separate article for Screen Rant, highlighted that over the course of the show it has "brought together a star-studded cast of actors" and that "while it is at its core a live-play of a tabletop RPG, the series sets itself apart with higher production values than many others, including detailed makeup and costume work as well as special effects. Over the course of its five seasons, the show has functioned as a sort of sequel to Vampire: The Masquerade, telling the story of two of the game's factions set some years after the plot detailed in the book".
