= Vampire: The Masquerade =

Tabletop role playing game

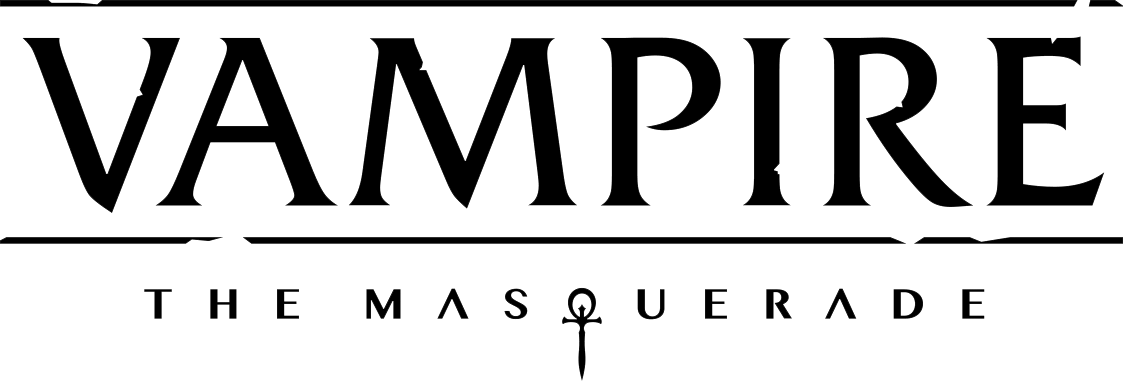
- Fifth edition logo

- Second edition cover
- Designers: Mark Rein•Hagen, Graeme Davis, Tom Dowd, Lisa Stevens, Stewart Wieck
- Publishers: White Wolf Publishing; Onyx Path Publishing; Modiphius Entertainment; Renegade Game Studios; By Night Studios
- Publication: 1991 (first edition); 1992 (second edition); 1998 (Revised Edition); 2011 (20th Anniversary Edition); 2018 (Fifth Edition)
- Genres: Personal horror
- Systems: Storyteller System
- Series: World of Darkness

Vampire: The Masquerade is a tabletop role-playing game, created by Mark Rein•Hagen and released in 1991 by White Wolf Publishing, as the first of several Storyteller System games for its World of Darkness setting. It is set in a fictionalized "gothic-punk" version of the modern world, where players assume the role of vampires, referred to as Kindred or Cainites, who struggle against their own bestial natures, vampire hunters, and each other.

Upon its release, Vampire: The Masquerade was a commercial and critical success, becoming one of the most influential tabletop RPGs of all time. It distinguished itself from many contemporary RPGs through its emphasis on narrative, drama, character development, and "personal horror," encouraging players to explore the moral and psychological consequences of immortality. Its modern Gothic-Punk setting, emphasis on political intrigue and social interaction, and the Storyteller System shifted attention away from tactical combat and heroic adventure found in many RPGs of the era, towards collaborative storytelling. The game's success led to the creation of the World of Darkness franchise, which expanded the setting with other similar games centered on supernatural creatures, such as Werewolf: The Apocalypse and Mage: The Ascension. White Wolf also released a number of spinoff games, such as the Asia-themed Kindred of the East and the historical Vampire: The Dark Ages.

In 2004, the game's publishing was discontinued in favor of the reboot Vampire: The Requiem, set in White Wolf's Chronicles of Darkness setting. Publication of Vampire: The Masquerade resumed in 2011 with the 20th Anniversary Edition, followed by a fifth edition in 2018.

Several associated products were produced based on Vampire: The Masquerade, including live-action role-playing games (Mind's Eye Theatre), dice, collectible card games (The Eternal Struggle), video games (Redemption, Bloodlines, Swansong, Bloodlines 2 and Bloodhunt), and numerous novels. In 1996, a short-lived television show loosely based on the game, Kindred: The Embraced, was produced by Aaron Spelling for the Fox Broadcasting Company.

== Development ==
Vampire was inspired by role-playing games (RPGs) such as Call of Cthulhu, RuneQuest, and Nightlife, as well as the writings of Joseph Campbell and vampire films such as The Lost Boys. Rein•Hagen felt that hunting vampires would get boring as a game premise, so he came up with the idea of a game wherein the players played vampires instead of hunting them. Rein•Hagen said he purposefully did not read Anne Rice's Vampire Chronicles until "very late" in the development process but admitted she was probably an influence on the vampire films that inspired the game. He wanted to go beyond what Anne Rice made to create a whole secret vampire society and culture.

Some of Vampire's central themes of the power of belief developed out of Rein•Hagen's religious upbringing. Inspired by a comic book given to him by White Wolf business partner Stewart Wieck, Rein•Hagen developed the idea that the Biblical Cain was the original vampire. Rein•Hagen has said the idea of Cain (spelled Caine in the game) as the progenitor of all vampires was a "big turning point." After initially "trying to shy away from religion", this encouraged him to lean into the religious themes.

Vampire was conceived as a dark urban fantasy game, with a gothic feel similar to TSR's Ravenloft. It would also be the first of a series of linked games sharing the same game world. Shannon Appelcline suggests that its visual style was considered striking at the time – its simple cover featured a photo of a rose on green marble. The game also focused on plots, intrigue, and character as opposed to more straightforward dungeon scenarios. While the RPG industry in general had been trending towards a more narrative approach, Vampire is considered one of the first mainstream games to focus on these elements. The vampires, or Kindred, were also given an extensive list of broad supernatural powers called Disciplines, which included superior strength, speed, and toughness, as well as other powers such as mystic senses, mind control, and blood magic. This helped the game appeal to fans of the superhero genre, which was more marketable at the time than horror. The 13 clans, based on vampiric archetypes, were added late in the development process, after a suggestion by Chris McDonough that players needed greater structure, similar to the character classes of other games. This system proved very popular with players and led to the popularization of the splatbook.

For the game's mechanical elements, Rein•Hagen turned to Tom Dowd, co-designer of Shadowrun (1989). Vampire's system of "comparative" dice pools drew on the mechanics innovated by Shadowrun, changing only the type of dice rolled from six-sided to ten-sided. Players rolled a number of dice determined by their skills, similar to games like Champions, but rather than adding the results of the dice together, Vampire counted the number of dice which met or exceeded a target number or difficulty. Skill levels were relatively low, ranging usually from one to five, and were represented with dots rather than numbers, which was the standard of its contemporaries. Players could quickly calculate their dice pool and roll against the assigned difficulty rating. Appelcline suggests this system aided a style of play which emphasized story over mechanics, as it was easy for new players to quickly grasp, though it sometimes produced unexpected results, such as a highly skilled character being more likely to fumble.

== Publication history ==
The original 1991 version was superseded by a second edition in 1992 and the Revised Edition in 1998. The Vampire: The Masquerade game line was discontinued in 2004, at which point it was superseded by Vampire: The Requiem. In mid-2010, White Wolf switched exclusively to a print-on-demand model via online role playing game store DriveThruRPG, starting with a number of formerly out of print Vampire: The Masquerade books and gradually making more titles available as they were ready for print.

=== 20th Anniversary Edition ===
On March 17, 2011, White Wolf announced Vampire: The Masquerade, 20th Anniversary Edition, which was published during the Grand Masquerade event in New Orleans on September 15–17, 2011, and released to the attendees. Customers not attending The Grand Masquerade were offered a limited time preorder option. The 20th Anniversary Edition (or V20) contains revisions of rules and is a compendium of information previously provided in supplemental material in the game's earlier life. V20 officially revived Vampire: The Masquerade as part of White Wolf Publishing's shift to a print-on-demand business model, and multiple new Masquerade products were subsequently announced. After White Wolf ceased publishing books directly, the licences to its tabletop roleplaying games, including Vampire, were transferred to Onyx Path Publishing, founded by former White Wolf Art Director Rich Thomas. White Wolf's live-action Mind's Eye Theatre products were published by By Night Studios.

=== Fifth edition ===
In August 2015, Onyx Path Publishing announced its intention to create a fourth edition of Vampire. Two months later, Paradox Interactive purchased White Wolf and all of its intellectual properties from CCP Games. It was announced that White Wolf would move ahead with a new edition of the game instead of Onyx Path, and White Wolf would remain a subsidiary of Paradox Interactive. With game designer Kenneth Hite as lead developer, Vampire: The Masquerade, Fifth Edition (also known as V5) was subsequently released in early 2018. It was distributed by Modiphius Entertainment, with production of supplements licensed to multiple publishers, including Modiphius and Onyx Path. After the release of the Anarch sourcebook in November 2018, Paradox Interactive announced it would no longer allow White Wolf to develop the series in-house due to references in the sourcebook to the anti-gay purges in Chechnya and other controversies surrounding White Wolf. In December 2018, Paradox announced that Modiphius Entertainment would continue the development of the series with final approval by Paradox Interactive.

In November 2020, Paradox Interactive announced that Renegade Game Studios would become the publishing partner for the entire World of Darkness brand and they would release all future Vampire: The Masquerade products. The company also announced it would bring IP development back in-house under the World of Darkness team, hiring former lead developer Justin Achilli as the World of Darkness Creative Lead. In 2021, the core rulebook and several other products were revised and updated to "meet new ethical standards enforced by the team at Paradox". V5 was released on Roll20 in June 2021. In July 2021, Renegade Game Studios released the updated versions of Vampire: The Masquerade, Fifth Edition books for retail distribution. The online toolset World of Darkness Nexus, which supports Vampire: The Masquerade and other games in the series, was launched in June 2022. Nexus includes bundles of both physical and digital game products, and contains a rules and lore compendium, character creation and management tools, matchmaking, and video chat functionality.

== Gameplay ==
=== Storyteller System ===
Vampire is based on the Storyteller System. The actions taken during gameplay are expressed using ten-sided dice. The number of dice used correspond to the player's current skill level, often based on two different skills that together represent the player's ability. For example, to land a punch, the character's dexterity and brawl skill are combined. The resulting number is the number of dice rolled to perform the task. The Storyteller then sets a target number or difficulty (usually 6) which must be achieved on at least one die to succeed. The more dice which meet or exceed the difficulty, the more successful the action is.

=== Vampire-specific systems ===
In addition to the general Storyteller rules, Vampire uses a number of specific mechanics aimed towards simulating the vampiric existence.

Vampires in the World of Darkness, known as Kindred or Cainites, make use of several familiar tropes of vampires in myth and legend such as immortality and a powerful thirst for blood. They are undead, so their hearts do not beat, they do not require food or drink, they do not age, their skin is cold and pale, and the only sustenance they require is blood. While they are ordinarily very difficult to kill, sunlight causes them to burn (and is consequently extremely dangerous), and a stake through the heart will paralyze them. Other tropes or weaknesses are described as mere legends or superstitions, such as a vampire's inability to cross running water or weakness to garlic. There is a system of merits and flaws that allow these other folkloric weaknesses and characteristics to come into play.

==== Vitae ====
The Kindred refer to their own supernatural blood as vitae, which they gain by feeding on humans. In-game, vitae is measured in blood points, which can be spent to fuel supernatural powers called Disciplines, to heal wounds, or to increase their physical strength, agility, or stamina.

A vampire's vitae can be fed to others to inspire false feelings of love and obsession, creating a dependency called the Blood Bond. In most cases, a victim must drink three times from the same vampire on three separate nights to become bonded to them. Once bonded, the victim also becomes more susceptible to mind control powers by that vampire and are willing to do anything, even risk their own life, to aid them. Mortals, animals, and even other vampires may also be bound.

A bound mortal or animal is called a Ghoul. Ghouls age very slowly and have limited access to some vampiric powers.

The Sabbat practice a form of group blood bonding called the Vaulderie, which inspires loyalty among the sect. It will also instantly break conventional blood bonds if performed correctly by a trained vampire, typically a Pack Priest. Blood bonds can usually only be negated with time and effort, depending on how strong the bond is and whether the victim can avoid the vampire for long enough.

==== The Embrace ====
Vampires create more of themselves by draining a human to the point of death and then feeding the victim some of their blood, in an act known as the Embrace. The creator vampire is known as a sire and the newly created vampire a childe.

A vampire's relative power is limited by their generation, which is their relative distance from the mythical first vampire, Caine. A ninth generation Kindred is eight steps removed from Caine by descent; their own progeny would always be nine steps removed, and hence of the tenth generation. Characters can only lower their generation by committing diablerie—the consumption of the soul of a vampire of lower generation. Most Kindred see diablerie as a criminal act.

In some sects, such as the Camarilla, the creation of new Kindred is tightly controlled. Among the Sabbat or the Anarchs, the norms are much looser. Individual clans, especially the independent clans, have different norms, rituals and restrictions surrounding the Embrace.

== Setting and Society ==
The setting is a gloomy and exaggerated version of the real world in which vampires and other monsters exist, called the World of Darkness. Vampire: the Masquerade focuses on the parts of the World of Darkness which pertain to vampires. Other types of supernaturals rarely interact with vampires.

Vampires in the World of Darkness have a complex and diverse secret society with a range of ideologies, goals, and backgrounds. The primary social divisions among vampires are a vampire's "clan", which is inherited from their sire, and "sect", a social grouping which is roughly akin to mortal governments. There are 13 major clans and three sects: the Camarilla, the Anarchs, and the Sabbat.

=== The Masquerade ===
In Vampire, the Masquerade refers to an organized conspiracy, primarily maintained by the Camarilla, to convince the general public that vampires do not exist. The Camarilla believes the Masquerade is the cornerstone survival strategy for Kindred and fear that without it the kine (humans) would rise up and exterminate them. Prohibitions against exposing the existence of Kindred existed prior to the Camarilla's formation in a set of ancient laws known as the Traditions. However, the First Tradition which establishes the Masquerade was not as strictly enforced before the formation of the Camarilla in the 15th century.

The Masquerade is largely enforced through self-policing, but it is primarily the job of the Prince in Camarilla controlled cities to enforce it. When breaches do occur, the Camarilla takes great pains to repair them. This could include anything from erasing a mortal's memories using supernatural powers to manipulating mortal pawns in order to keep events out of the media.

The Masquerade is one of the main in-game points of contention between the two major factions of vampires in the World of Darkness. While many vampires see the pragmatism in the Masquerade, some do not agree with it. The Sabbat do not uphold the Tradition that justifies the enforcement of the Masquerade but behind closed doors even they take some steps to contain breaches.

=== Clans ===
A clan is the character's vampire family. All members of a clan allegedly descend from the same founder, most of which are a class of especially ancient vampire known as an Antediluvian (since they existed "before the Flood"). Clans may have a social or political component to them, but a clan is something a vampire is Embraced into rather than choosing. Some vampires, especially younger vampires, fail to inherit the clan characteristics of their sire's clan. These vampires are known as Caitiff, and are considered outsiders.

Most clans are associated with a sect. Members of the clan that are not in their clan's sect are known as "antitribu" (i.e. anti-clan). For instance, a Ventrue who was a member of the Sabbat would be known as a "Ventrue antitribu" because clan Ventrue is normally part of the Camarilla.

Each clan has a unique set of powers called Disciplines, and their own set of weaknesses. Two of the original clans, the Salubri and Cappadocians, were usurped by newer bloodlines—the Tremere and Giovanni, respectively. The 13 major clans are:

- Banu Haqim: Formerly known as the Assamites before Fifth Edition, the Banu Haqim (lit. 'Children of Haqim') are undead assassins paid in Vitae for use in a special ritual that bring them closer to their Antediluvian, Haqim. Originally they were independent of the sects, but joined the Camarilla in Fifth Edition.
- Brujah: The Brujah were noble philosophers and warrior-poets at the time of Carthage, but have degenerated to a clan of rebels, rogues, and anti-authoritarians. Brujah possess great passion that makes it harder for them to resist the Beast. The Brujah are one of the seven founding clans of the Camarilla, though most joined the Anarch Movement in Fifth Edition.
- Gangrel: The Gangrel are animalistic shape-shifters who shun the cities for the wilderness beyond. When Gangrel frenzy, they resemble the Beast, taking on animal features. Gangrel are one of the founding clans of the Camarilla, although their leadership officially became independent at the end of the 1990s. Some Gangrel remain in the Camarilla while others are found in the Anarchs.
- Hecata: The Hecata formed from the ashes of several, mostly related bloodlines of necromancers, after the leader of the largest faction, Augustus Giovanni, was slain in Fifth Edition. The Giovanni descend from a Venetian merchant family whose patriarch usurped clan Cappadocian, an older lineage with a more scholarly bent. The clan's weakness means that their bite (which in other vampires is pleasurable to the victim) causes excruciating pain. The Hecata, like the Giovanni before them, actively remain independent.
- Lasombra: Historically associated with religion and rulership, the Lasombra see power over others and themselves as their noblesse oblige. As one of the two founding clans of the Sabbat, they gained notoriety for allegedly destroying their Antediluvian founder. They control shadows and study the Abyss, and they do not appear in mirrors. In Fifth Edition, around half of the Lasombra join the Camarilla.
- Malkavian: The Malkavians are lunatics whose madness grants them strange insights. Their Discipline of Dementation allows them to spread their insanity like a plague, but they are respected for their oracular abilities. They appear connected to a hive-mind they call the Malkavian Madness Network, and are one of the founding clans of the Camarilla.
- The Ministry: Formerly known as the Followers of Set, this clan of cultists once worshipped their Antediluvian progenitor, the Egyptian god Set. Now they worship the metaphorical "Set within". They are masters of forbidden lore and spread corruption and temptation through the world. Setites are especially sensitive to light. As the Followers of Set, they were independent of the sects. In Fifth Edition, they have rebranded as the Ministry, and have allied themselves with the Anarchs.
- Nosferatu: At the Embrace, every Nosferatu turns into a hideous monster, forcing them to dwell in the shadows. Their place on the margins inspires the clan to present a unified front, and their stealth allows them to learn (and trade) secrets others would rather keep hidden. Prior to Fifth Edition, this included maintaining the vampire "internet", ShreckNet. They are one of the founding members of the Camarilla.
- Ravnos: The Ravnos are seen as outcasts, vagabonds, and charlatans. Many of them follow complicated rules concerning the nature of illusion and reality. The Ravnos are thrillseekers who are subject to intense vices and virtues, making it hard for them to stay in one place for too long. After their Antediluvian awoke and was destroyed, the clan was temporarily overcome with madness. Now the Ravnos are greatly depleted in number, and many remain independent.
- Toreador: Toreador are sensitive, artistic, and sometimes debauched hedonists fascinated by the mortal world. Toreador often Embrace for beauty or to preserve artistic talent. They are enthralled by beauty, and suffer when deprived of it. They are one of the founding clans of the Camarilla.
- Tremere: The Tremere are descended from a house of mortal mages who stole immortality through experiments with Tzimisce Vitae. Their founder diablerized the Antediluvian of the former clan Salubri, solidifying the Tremere's clan status. Until Fifth Edition, the Tremere were intensely hierarchical, with every member partially blood bound to their ruling elders. Now the clan is fractured, with its four houses aligned to different sects: House Tremere (Camarilla), House Carna (independent), House Ipsissimus (Anarch), and House Goratrix (formerly Sabbat, currently unknown). The Tremere are one of the founding clans of the Camarilla.
- Tzimisce: Otherworldly and scholarly, the Tzimisce ruled over their lands in Eastern Europe for centuries, forming deep spiritual connections with it. Like the Lasombra, the Tzimisce claim to have destroyed their founder and are pillars of the Sabbat. The Tzimisce are known for their pursuit of metamorphosis, sculpting flesh and bone like clay, and making horrific war-ghouls. In Fifth edition, some Tzimisce have joined the Anarchs.
- Ventrue: The Ventrue traditionally play the roles of aristocrats and kings, seeking power and wealth to support their rule over Kindred and Kine. The Ventrue are picky eaters who may only feed from a specific kind of vessel (e.g. virgins, blondes, youngest siblings). They are one of the founding clans of the Camarilla.

==== Bloodlines ====
Bloodlines cannot trace their lineage to an Antediluvian founder or are too few in number to be considered a major player in the Jyhad. Some bloodlines are considered to be offshoots of existing clans, while others have no known origin—and in some cases, they are remnants of "true" clans who were replaced or usurped by another bloodline (such as the Salubri, who were usurped by the Tremere). All bloodlines are exceptionally rare in the game, leaving most of the interactions and storylines centered around the clans.

=== Sects ===
While many factions and sub-sects exist in the game, the main focus is the conflict between the Camarilla, the Sabbat and the Anarchs. These sects are divided based on their laws and norms, feeding, the treatment of vessels, vampiric morality, secrecy, feeding grounds, Gehenna, and the distribution of power. A sect is something a character may choose in-game, though this decision is often chosen for them by their sire. Defection to one side or the other comes with great risk, as much of what motivates the Jyhad are the ideological differences between the Camarilla and the Sabbat.

=== Age ===
An important means of social distinction among vampires in this setting is through age. Younger vampires wanting respect and power must prove themselves to their elders. While ambition can provide a degree of upward mobility among immortals, oftentimes respect comes to those who can prove they can survive. Characters are loosely divided into several age groups. Ages are not titles or jobs but rather loose descriptions to describe a vampire's development and the social expectations that come with aging.

- Fledgling: Newly Embraced vampires who have yet to formally enter vampire society. Fledglings are still too ignorant and weak to survive on their own and are dependent on their sires for protection and education.
- Neonates: Though still young, a neonate has proved that they can survive on their own and is seen as a full-fledged member of their society.
- Ancillae: An ancilla has survived a few decades or perhaps a few centuries. They have also likely accomplished something in their time for their sect or clan.
- Elder: A relative term that could indicate a vampire is anywhere between 200 and 1,000 years old. They generally have a great deal of wealth, influence, or power to leverage in the Jyhad.
- Methuselah: Methuselahs range between 1,000 and 2,000 years old. At this age, vampires begin to retreat from society and many do not survive the profound changes brought on by surviving this long.
- Antediluvian: Antediluvians are believed to be those vampires of the Third Generation who are, in effect, Caine's grandchildren. There are rumored to be only thirteen of them.

== Myths and origins ==
Vampires in the World of Darkness believe their race originates from the Biblical figure of Cain, or Caine, Caine was said to have been cursed by God with a vampiric state for murdering his brother. The vampires of this canon believe themselves to be descended from this Biblical progenitor. Caine passed on his cursed state to others, thereby making them like himself, only somewhat weaker. These first childer, known as the second generation, were made to keep him company, and they in turn made the third generation, known as the Antediluvians. There were supposedly 13 Antediluvians, who are the semi-legendary founders of the 13 original clans. According to in-game legend, all of these vampires lived in peace under Caine's rule in the legendary city known as Enoch, or the First City. When God caused the Great Flood, the city was destroyed and Caine disappeared, leaving his children to fend for themselves. The third generation eventually rose up and slew their sires. Caine, upon discovering this, cursed them, giving each clan its own unique weakness. These myths are collected in an in-game document of dubious reliability known as the Book of Nod. Those who study the mythical vampire origins are called Noddists. Noddists claim Caine will return at the end of time to judge his descendants: the Antediluvians and all vampires descended from them. This event is known as Gehenna, the end of all vampires. Others claim that Gehenna is simply the awakening of the Antediluvians who have returned to feed on the blood of their descendants.

Differing interpretations of the myths divide vampire society. The Sabbat take the myths quite literally and believe it is their purpose to defend vampires from the ancients. The Camarilla is more dismissive, either claiming that Caine is a myth or metaphor, or outright suppressing the myths and their study. Contentions between the different societies surrounding the origins of vampires and Gehenna are important in-game motivations for the Jyhad that color each character's understanding of their world. According to the game's creators, the myth of Caine represents several important themes in the game's metaplot, such as sins of the father coming back upon his children, the threat of apocalypse, questions of faith, conspiracies, and the war between the young and old. In contrast to Gehenna, Golconda is a fabled state of enlightenment which offers Kindred a release from their struggle with the Beast. Golconda is presented as an elusive and mysterious state, and there is very little information in-game or out as to how to achieve it.

== Reception ==
When released in 1991, Vampire: The Masquerade was one of the top ten best selling tabletop role-playing games of the year in the United States. Martin Wixted reviewed Vampire: The Masquerade in White Wolf #29 (October/November 1991), rating it 5 out of 5, and said: "Vampire: The Masquerade is a game which will leave you thirsting for campaign-style play. Its character development elements are particularly rich and satisfying over a period of extended adventuring. But with pregenerated characters and the possibility for mayhem that the power of a vampire persona offers, don't forget to try a simple night out."

In the November 1991 edition of Dragon (Issue 175), Allen Varney said the production values were unprofessional, including "amateurish" artwork and poor copy-editing. Varney also found the rules lacking in sufficient detail. However, he applauded the wide-ranging campaign advice, saying: "There are whole chapters on how to plot stories, maintain suspense, handle players, and so on." He concluded, "If you're up for a potent and even passionate role-playing experience, look for this game." Steve Crow reviewed Vampire: The Masquerade (2nd edition) in White Wolf #34 (January/February 1993), rating it 5 out of 5, and said: "The layout has been cleaned up, the text is crisp, clear and fully intact from the original, and the MOOD! Yow!"

In a 1996 reader poll by Arcane magazine, Vampire: The Masquerade was ranked 6th on a list of the 50 most popular roleplaying games of all time. Editor Paul Pettengale said that, although it had a tendency to take itself a little too seriously, Vampire's success was due to "the continuing appeal of the vampire itself, and to the structure and design of the game". He said that while the game was often hard to get right, "it can be an immensely interesting and thought-provoking game, and one of the most effective horror RPGs around" with the right group.

Scott Taylor for Black Gate in 2013 rated Vampire: The Masquerade as #10 in the top ten role-playing games of all time, saying, "I don't like vampires, be they shiny or horrific, this game has to be given its props as it propelled White Wolf into a full-fledged gaming company when gaming companies were in the process of dying in droves."

=== Awards ===
- In 1992, Vampire: The Masquerade won the Origins Award for Best Roleplaying Rules of 1991.
- In 1993, the second edition of Vampire: The Masquerade won Casus Belli's awards for the best role-playing game of 1992, and for the best French translation of a role-playing game of 1992
- In 2007, the game was inducted into the Origins Awards Hall of Fame.
- In 2019, the 5th edition of Vampire: The Masquerade won the Origins Award for Best Roleplaying Game of the Year and won the Origins Fan Favorite Award. It is the "second RPG to win Best-Roleplaying Game twice".
- In 2023, interactive novel Vampire: The Masquerade – Sins of the Sires by Natalia Theodoridou was nominated for the Nebula Award for Best Game Writing.

=== Reviews ===
- Shadis #9
- Shadis #29
- Dragão Brasil #1 (1994) (Portuguese)
- Dosdediez (no. 7 – February/March 1995)
- Realms of Fantasy

== Tie-ins and adaptations ==
=== RPG adaptions and spinoffs ===
- Steve Jackson Games published an adaptation of Vampire: The Masquerade using their popular GURPS generic table-top roleplaying system. They followed this book up with a supplement called GURPS: Vampire Companion. Both books were produced for use with the Third Edition of the GURPS rules and are no longer in print. The Steve Jackson company also produced GURPS conversions of Werewolf: The Apocalypse, and Mage: The Ascension.
- Werewolf: The Apocalypse, Mage: The Ascension, Wraith: The Oblivion, Changeling: The Dreaming, Hunter: The Reckoning, Mummy: The Resurrection, Kindred of the East, and Demon: The Fallen are other RPG titles set in the World of Darkness, a setting which Vampire: The Masquerade first established.
- Vampire: The Requiem is a spiritual successor to the game, introduced when the original gameline ended in 2004. Although it is an entirely new game, it uses many elements of the old game, including many clan and discipline names and a modified version of the Storyteller system called the Storytelling system. At the White Wolf Camarilla meeting in October 2009, it was decided to re-support the Storyteller games both in the official Camarilla fan club and outside to tabletop players.
- Under the title Mind's Eye Theatre: The Masquerade White Wolf also provided a live action role-playing game in the same setting, using their Mind's Eye Theatre system.

=== Non-roleplaying tabletop games ===
Vampire: The Eternal Struggle (first published 1994 as Jyhad), a traditional collectible card game based on Vampire, was produced by Wizards of the Coast and later by White Wolf. It is currently produced by Black Chantry, a company founded solely for this purpose, under license by Paradox Interactive, by republishing old cards and making minor balancing adjustments to the rules or card texts. The relaunch by Black Chantry changes the mode of distribution by scrapping booster packs in favor of non-randomized precompiled card sets. A fifth edition was released in 2020.

In 2020, Paradox licensed the setting to several game production companies, leading to multiple Kickstarter campaigns.

- Vampire: The Masquerade – Rivals is a re-interpretation of The Eternal Struggle, changing and simplifying some of the rules. It is produced by Renegade Game Studios and is marketed as an 'expandable card game', rather than a traditional trading card game. The initial boxed release included decks for four players as well as one set of "city" cards, which are used by all players equally. This moves the game closer to a traditional board game where the city cards are required to play, as opposed to a traditional TCG, where any two players owning a deck can duel each other.
- Vampire: The Masquerade – Heritage is a legacy board game in which players control a clan vying over control for a span of 600 years.
- Vampire: The Masquerade – Chapters is a board game using miniatures which follows a story campaign, trying to emulate the experience of an RPG campaign without the need for a Storyteller (i.e. game master).
- Vampire: The Masquerade – Vendetta is a card-based strategy game about controlling territory in Chicago.
- Vampire: The Masquerade – Blood Feud is a board game for up to 32 players which requires a Storyteller.
- Vampire: The Masquerade – Prince's Gambit is a card-based game in which part of the players form a hostile faction whose membership is unknown, similar to the Werewolf or Mafia party games.
- Blood Points accessory by Shield Games were small glass beads to help player keep track of their powers in Vampire and Jyhad.

=== Video games ===
- Vampire: The Masquerade – Redemption, a video game based upon the Vampire milieu, developed by Nihilistic Software and published in 2000 by Activision.
- Vampire: The Masquerade – Bloodlines. Developed by Troika Games and published by Activision in 2004, it uses Valve's Source engine. A sequel, Bloodlines 2, was released in 2025.
- Vampire: The Masquerade – Coteries of New York is a video game by Draw Distance, released in 2019 for Windows PC, and 2020 for other platforms. A sequel, Shadows of New York, was released in 2020.
- Vampire: The Masquerade, a line of interactive fiction titles developed by Choice of Games from 2020 to 2022.
- Vampire: The Masquerade – Bloodhunt, a video game is a free-to-play battle royale game developed and published by Swedish developer Sharkmob. It was published on April 27, 2022.
- Vampire: The Masquerade – Swansong is a role-playing video game developed by Big Bad Wolf, released in 2022 for Microsoft Windows, Nintendo Switch, PlayStation 4, PlayStation 5, Xbox One, and Xbox Series X/S.
- Vampire: The Masquerade – Justice, a virtual reality game was released on November 2, 2023.
- Vampire: The Masquerade – Oaths & Ashes, a visual novel developed by Revive the Spark, was released for Microsoft Windows and Linux on November 10, 2026.
- Vampire the Masquerade: Eternal Whispers

=== Novels and comics ===
- Moonstone Books published a series of comic book adaptations of Vampire: The Masquerade beginning in 2001 which are now hard to find, but some of them made it into DriveThruRPG's Print on Demand service.
- There have been multiple novels published, the most extensive one being the so-called 'Clan Novels', which came in a current time and a medieval series.
- Vampire: The Masquerade is an ongoing horror comic book published by Vault Comics since 2020.
- World of Darkness: Crimson Thaw (2021) is a limited series comic published by Vault Comics. It contains game "material for the fifth edition of the Vampire: The Masquerade tabletop [...] allowing gamers to actually play the events of the series in their own games". It also merges lore with Werewolf: The Apocalypse.

=== Television, web series and other media ===
- Kindred: The Embraced, a 1996 television series based on Vampire, was produced by Aaron Spelling.
- A compilation album, called Music from the Succubus Club, was released by Dancing Ferret Discs to serve as a soundtrack for the Vampire RPG.
- L.A. by Night (2018) is an actual play web series using the Fifth Edition of Vampire, led by Jason Carl as the storyteller, which premiered in September 2018. The cast includes regular members B. Dave Walters, Cynthia Marie, Alexander Ward, Erika Ishii, Xander Jeanneret, and Josephine McAdam. The first three seasons were distributed by Geek & Sundry, but the fourth season onwards was hosted on World of Darkness' channels.
- Seattle by Night (2019) is an actual play web series and podcast, distributed by Penny Arcade, using the Fifth Edition of Vampire, led by Jason Carl as the Storyteller, which premiered in November 2019. The first-season cast included Mike Krahulik, Dora Litterell, Jasmine Bhullar, and Jerry Holkins. The second season premiered in 2023 and starred Krahulik, Bhullar, Holkins and Luis Carazo. It is also a prequel to Vampire: The Masquerade – Bloodlines 2 (2025).
- Vein Pursuit (2020) is an actual play web series, distributed on the official World of Darkness' channels, using the Fifth Edition of Vampire. It premiered in January 2020. Karim Muammar acts as Storyteller and the show features various Paradox Interactive and Hardsuit Labs employees who play as a group of "incompetent Anarch envoys trying to drive from L.A. to Seattle to back up a courier". The events of the show precede the video game Bloodlines 2.
- NY by Night (2022) is an actual play web series using the Fifth Edition of Vampire, led by Jason Carl as the storyteller, which premiered in July 2022. It acts as a sequel to L.A. by Night (2018). Before the premiere, World of Darkness announced the planned structure of the first three seasons. The first season focuses on four Anarchs, played by Alexander Ward, Mayanna Beren, Aabria Iyengar, Joey Rassool, who chafe under the Camarilla's rules. Season two focuses on Camarilla Kindred maintaining their power in the city. Season three was described as bringing these parallel storylines together as the two coteries collide. However, the filming of the third season has been delayed. In 2025, some members of the cast formed the Project Ghostlight group to create their own independent and non-official World of Darkness actual plays. In December 2025, Carl left Paradox.
- Dimension 20: City Council of Darkness (2026) is an actual play web series using Vampire and produced in partnership by Dropout and White Wolf. It features Brennan Lee Mulligan as the storyteller with Brian Murphy, Ally Beardsley, Siobhan Thompson, Zac Oyama, Emily Axford, and Lou Wilson as players. It focuses on a group of outcast vampires who are forced to manage the local government in the small town of Purpee, Oregon.
