= Rika (Pokémon) =

Pokémon character

- Pokémon character
- Rika in Pokémon Scarlet and Violet
- First appearance: Pokémon Scarlet and Violet (2022)
- Voiced by: English: Erika Ishii; Japanese: Mitsuki Saiga; Ryoko Shiraishi

Rika, known in Japan as Chili (Japanese: チリ, Hepburn: Chiri), is a character in the 2022 video game Pokémon Scarlet and Violet. Set in the fictional region of Paldea, she is one of the strongest Pokémon Trainers in the region, belonging to a group called the Elite Four and typically using Ground-type Pokémon. She is tall, thin, and has long, green hair, speaking with a Kansai-like dialect in the Japanese version. She is voiced by Mitsuki Saiga and Erika Ishii in the anime Pokémon Horizons: The Series in Japanese and English respectively.

Rika has received generally positive reception, praised for her design as well as her androgyny. She was particularly popular with Japanese women who considered her attractive, and ranked among the most popular characters from Scarlet and Violet.

== Appearances ==
Rika first appears in 2022 in the games Pokémon Scarlet and Violet. Set in the fictional region of Paldea, she is among its strongest trainers, and belongs to a group called the Elite Four, which is tasked with serving as an ultimate challenge to academy students who have defeated eight Gym Leaders and received their badges. She is accompanied by fellow Elite Four members Poppy, Larry, and Hassel. She is also responsible for conducting the admission interview to ensure that anyone challenging the Elite Four is ready to do so. These questions include factual questions as well as questions about the player's motivations. She specializes in Ground-type Pokémon, and her main Pokémon is Clodsire. She reappears in the downloadable content (DLC) The Hidden Treasure of Area Zero as part of its second expansion, The Indigo Disk, where players can battle or trade Pokémon with her. She also appears in the gacha game Pokémon Masters EX as a duo with Clodsire, added to the game in April 2024. They are among multiple characters that players can recruit to their team to participate in battles.

Rika also appears in Pokémon Horizons: The Series in a similar capacity, where she meets protagonist Liko. She later participates in an Elite Four 2v2 battle, where she defeats Liko. Rika also appears as a card in the Pokémon Trading Card Game, first introduced in the Japanese set "Raging Surf." In this set, Rika was featured in a rare type of card called a Secret Illustration Rare depicting her walking while she eats ice cream.

She has received multiple pieces of merchandise, including figures and clothing based on her outfit.

== Concept and design ==
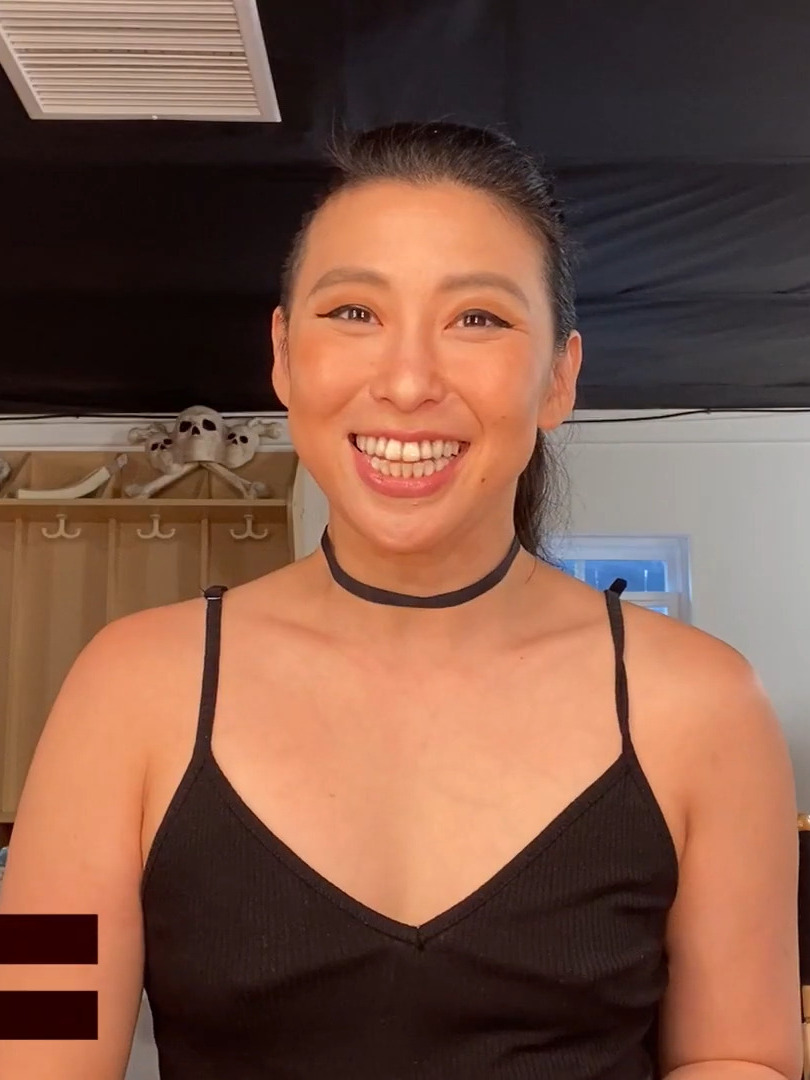
Erika Ishii voices Rika in English.

Rika has long green hair, slanted eyebrows, and is tall and slim with long legs. She wears a suit, black gloves, earrings, high-cut boots, and a loose necktie. She is described as having a "cool appearance" while being very friendly. While she speaks formally normally, she speaks more roughly as she becomes invested in a battle. Rika normally speaks with a Kansai-like dialect. When interviewing people, Rika speaks with a "polite, standard Japanese" dialect. In Japanese, she refers to herself in the third person at times and calls herself "Chili-chan."

Rika is voiced in the Japanese dub of Pokémon Horizons: The Series by Mitsuki Saiga, who is known for her androgynous, handsome voice according to Inside Games. When offered the role, the actress expressed interest due to finding Rika's appearance attractive. To prepare for the role, she studied intonation with a vocal coach. Saiga remarked that she received comments from her colleagues about how excited they were to see Rika get a voice. When describing Rika's personality, Saiga called the character an "older sister" type who tries to make those around her happier, stating that she is strong as a trainer but does not show off. Pokémon Horizons: The Series' casting director described Rika as being cheerful, energetic and having a magnetic personality. She is voiced in English by Erika Ishii. In Pokémon Masters EX, she is voiced in Japanese by Ryoko Shiraishi, speaking in a Kansai dialect.

== Reception ==
Rika has received generally positive reception and has been identified as a popular character by Inside Games writer Sawadee Otsuka, who felt she embodied "gap moe," a term referring to an affection towards someone's personality not matching their look. He believed Rika was the most popular character from Scarlet and Violet. She received a substantial amount of fanart, including by Hakuoki character designer Kazuki Yone. Fellow Inside Games writer Oonappa stated that the character became a trending topic on Twitter in February 2023 after it was announced illustrations of Rika would appear in an official game strategy guide. Fellow Inside Games writer Yabata praised both of the character's Japanese voice actors, opining that Rika became more attractive and popular after getting a voice.

Rika's design has received praise for being attractive. Nintendo Dream staff conducted a poll of readers' favorite characters in Pokémon Scarlet and Violet, stating that common responses to the poll included surprise over her being a woman and how cool they found her. They also identified her contrasting manners of speech and personalities as strong qualities of the character. In a survey by the website Numan asking who respondents would give chocolate to on Valentine's Day, Rika was among the top results. Den Fami Nico Gamer staff praised her design, calling it the "best in the world" and praising her Poké Ball throw animation in particular. They also expressed appreciation that so much fanart of her depicted her with Clodsire. Magmix writer Tunakan felt that Rika was a handsome character due to her long legs, long green hair, and outfit, stating that she felt similarly to a male role in a Takarazuka Revue performance. Tunakun noted that Rika has attracted a large female fanbase, attributing this to her friendliness, Kansai dialect, and personality shift in battles. Inside Games writer Hibiki also considered her a handsome character, stating that many Japanese female content creators have shown attraction to Rika and that some players have commented that their "sexual preferences have been destroyed." Hibiki felt that Rika had too many good qualities to count, including how serious she is when interviewing the protagonist, her easygoing personality, and how she interacts with Poppy. A writer for the website Nijimen opined that Rika was the most attractive female Pokémon character, remarking that despite Rika being a woman, she still found herself falling for her.

It was speculated by Japanese players that Rika may be from Johto, the region of Pokémon Gold and Silver, due to her Kansai-like dialect being used in Johto, as well as her using Clodsire, a Pokémon evolving from Wooper, which comes from Gold and Silver. The fact that the dialect was rare in Paldea only furthered this theory for Inside Games writer Sawadee Otsuka. Rika was a popular request by fans to return in Scarlet and Violet DLC, including by Otsuka, who bemoaned the fact that she could not be met after beating the game.

Rika and Larry became a popular ship in the months following the release of Scarlet and Violet in November 2022, among Japanese players according to Automaton Media writer Hideaki Fujiwara, growing quickly as a ship and having hundreds of images together on the website Pixiv. There was some surprise as to the popularity of the ship by non-Japanese people, and Fujiwara felt that the two characters' personalities were highly contrasting, believing that this actually contributed to the ship's popularity.
