= Vampire: The Masquerade – Swansong =

2022 role-playing video game

- Cover art featuring the vampire Emem Louis
- Developer: Big Bad Wolf
- Publisher: Nacon
- Director: Thomas Veauclin
- Designer: Clément Plantier
- Programmer: Colin Graud
- Artist: Thomas Veauclin
- Writer: Thomas Veauclin
- Composer: Olivier Deriviere
- Series: Vampire: The Masquerade
- Engine: Unreal Engine 4
- Platforms: Microsoft Windows; Nintendo Switch; PlayStation 4; PlayStation 5; Xbox One; Xbox Series X/S
- Release: Windows, PlayStation 4, PlayStation 5, Xbox One, Xbox Series X/S; May 19, 2022; Nintendo Switch; September 28, 2023
- Genre: Role-playing
- Mode: Single-player

Vampire: The Masquerade – Swansong is a role-playing video game developed by Big Bad Wolf and published by Nacon. It was released in May 2022 for Microsoft Windows, PlayStation 4, PlayStation 5, Xbox One, and Xbox Series X/S and in September 2023 for Nintendo Switch. It is based on White Wolf Publishing's tabletop role-playing game Vampire: The Masquerade, and is a part of the larger World of Darkness series.

== Gameplay ==
Vampire: The Masquerade – Swansong is a narrative-driven, single-player role-playing video game in which the player controls three vampires with different vampiric disciplines (abilities), switching between them over the course of the game. The player can customize the characters by choosing to upgrade their disciplines and character statistics to suit their preferred playstyle; this influences character interaction and skills used while exploring the game world, such as picking locks and hacking computer terminals. Because the player characters often are surrounded by humans, the player needs to be careful about when and where they choose to use supernatural abilities, to avoid revealing their characters' vampiric nature.

Throughout the game, the characters are put in difficult situations where the player has to make moral choices, with no obviously correct choice.

== Synopsis ==
The story follows three vampires, each about a hundred years old, from different vampire clans with differing views on the Camarilla's rule: Galeb, an intimidating man of clan Ventrue; Emem, a "seductive Amazon" of clan Toreador; and Leysha of clan Malkavian, who relies on supernatural insight and spreading madness. The three investigate conspiracies in Boston following a shootout, starting with who ordered the attack and why.

Swansong is set in Boston, in the World of Darkness, where vampires exist unbeknownst to humanity. This practice of hiding from humans is called the Masquerade, and is upheld by the vampire sect the Camarilla. The new Camarilla prince of Boston, Hazel Iversen, is trying to strengthen the Camarilla's presence by bringing Boston and Hartford together. Although vampires previously had been occupied with rivalry between factions, they have changed focus to trying to survive, following events like the fall of London as a home to vampires, and so the Boston Camarilla wants to ensure that all vampires in the Northeastern United States are safe.

The plot revolves around the aftermath of the violent circumstances of the reunification of Boston and Hartford domains negotiated by Hazel Iversen, the Prince of Boston and Tremere Chantry of Hartford. Various highly influential members of the Camarilla community were expertly destroyed or captured by a group that appear to be highly knowledgeable about their quarry's weaknesses. Investigations reveal that the culprit of the raid was the Society of St Leopold, a sect of vampire hunters funded and supported by the Holy See, and Special Affairs Division, a governmental agency with a similar briefing. Each protagonist has their specific mission to bring the affair to a close. Galeb is tasked with the assassination of Monsignor Stanford, the leader of the Second Inquisition and wielder of True Faith; Emem is required to infiltrate the enemy HQ to corrupt their substantial database of information on vampires, while Leysha pursues her own daughter, who was staked and abducted during one of SI's raids into Camarilla territory. The game features numerous endings, depending which main and/or side characters survive their ordeals, and what actions they took.

== Development ==
Swansong is developed by Big Bad Wolf, a branch of Cyanide, and is designed by Clément Plantier. It is based on the fifth edition of the tabletop role-playing game Vampire: The Masquerade, and uses the portrayal of Boston from the 1990s tabletop game books Dark Colony and Giovanni Chronicles, while updating it for the present-day setting. The developers incorporated some game mechanics from the tabletop game into Swansong, but chose to focus on designing the game around player choices and consequences. Although referencing both past tabletop game material and another video game adaptation, Bloodlines, the game is still designed to be approachable for players who are not familiar with the series. In adapting the tabletop game to a video game format, the developers considered a role-playing video game the best option, for allowing them to tell a story and for giving players freedom to role-play.

The game was originally announced to be in development in May 2019 to be released in 2021, and was presented in October 2019 at PDXCON. In July 2021, the game was delayed to February 2022. In November 2021, it was delayed to May 2022. Published by Nacon, the full game was released on May 19, 2022, for Microsoft Windows, Nintendo Switch, PlayStation 4, PlayStation 5, Xbox One, and Xbox Series X/S, following delays from 2021 due to the COVID-19 pandemic slowing down the production. In November 2022, it was reported that the owners of the PlayStation 4 version aren't able to upgrade to the PlayStation 5 version of the game despite it advertised on the game box. Nacon claims the advertisement for the upgrade was a mistake since the game isn't a "cross-gen product".

== Reception ==
Reception

Aggregate score
Aggregator	Score
Metacritic	(PC) 66/100 (PS5) 63/100 (XSXS) 62/100

Review scores
Publication	Score
Destructoid	7/10
Electronic Gaming Monthly	3/5
Game Informer	8.5/10
GameSpot	4/10
GamesRadar+	2.5/5
Hardcore Gamer	3.5/5
IGN	5/10
Jeuxvideo.com	15/20
PC Gamer (US)	50/100
PCGamesN	7/10
Push Square	7/10
RPGFan	80/100
Pure Xbox	6/10

Vampire: The Masquerade - Swansong received "mixed or average" reviews, according to review aggregator Metacritic. Critics praised the game's RPG mechanics, player freedom, and lore, while criticizing the gameplay, narrative, and a perceived lack of polish.

Eric Van Allen of Destructoid gave the game a 7 out of 10, writing, "When it's leaning heavily into logic puzzles, mystery, deduction, and sleuthing, Vampire: The Masquerade – Swansong sings. It's the janky issues, rough exploration puzzles, and a few odd choices that prevent Swansong from being a showstopper." Michael Goroff of EGM appreciated the amount of player choice present, noting that it lent depth to an otherwise standard narrative, but noted that the gameplay balance, facial animations, and emotional beats of the narrative were lacking and underdeveloped. Andrew Reiner of Game Informer reviewed the title much more positively and awarded it an 8.5 out of 10, likening its structure to The Forgotten City while praising the agency it gave the player. David Wildgoose of GameSpot, by contrast, gave Swansong a 4 out of 10, writing, "Swansong ultimately has little to recommend it. Its writing is stilted, its storytelling muddled, and its puzzle design is mostly unimaginative. Sadly, there isn't even any kind of worthwhile payoff if you do manage to see it through to its conclusion." Rachel Weber of GamesRadar+ lauded the rich universe and exploration mechanics while taking issue with its inaccessible design, underutilization of vampire powers, and poorly conceived conversation mechanics. Gabriel Moss of IGN gave the game a 5 out of 10, criticizing its dull story and gameplay, stating, "[Swansong]'s premise is interesting, but its heroes and villains are bland, and as a result the lukewarm story takes far too long to rev up to its maximum potential." Rick Lane of PC Gamer similarly wrote, "Vampire: The Masquerade – Swansong offers an impressively flexible story, but that can't save it from its mediocre writing and scattershot game design." Phil Iwaniuk of PCGamesN noted that despite its lack of polish and innovation, Swansong's atmosphere, the depth it presented to the player, was its saving grace. John Cal McCormick of Push Square praised the game's lore, vampire-focused narrative, and dark tone while taking minor issue with its confusing puzzles and technical issues. PJ O'Reilly of Pure Xbox noted that the game gets off with a strong start and an intriguing premise at its core, but that it quickly falls victim to tedious gameplay, undercooked conversational aspects, and a host of bugs.
