= The Glass Cannon =

Fantasy-based role-playing game podcast

The Glass Cannon Podcast
- Genre: Comedy, adventure, roleplaying
- Language: English

Cast and voices
- Starring: Troy Lavallee (Game Master); Joe O'Brien; Skid Maher; Matthew Capodicasa; Grant Berger (Campaign One); Sydney Amanuel (Campaign Two); Kate Stamas (Campaign Two)

Music
- Theme music composed by: Kevin MacLeod

Production
- Length: ~60-90 minutes

Publication
- No. of episodes: 326 (As of 4/17/2022)
- Original release: June 16, 2015

Related
- Website: https://glasscannonnetwork.com/

The Glass Cannon is an actual play podcast featuring the Pathfinder Roleplaying Game by Paizo Publishing, and is the flagship podcast of The Glass Cannon Network (GCN).

== History ==
Troy Lavallee pitched the idea of the Glass Cannon Podcast to his friends Joe O'Brien and Skid Maher. They chose to play Pathfinder because of its relative unpopularity in podcasts compared to Dungeons & Dragons.

The first episode of the first campaign was released on June 16, 2015, and the campaign came to a conclusion on June 2022 after 326 episodes. The campaign followed the Giantslayer adventure path from Paizo, supplemented by homebrew content.

In 2017, the GCN signed a licensing deal with Paizo which allowed monetization of the show. The deal was extended three years in 2018. The Glass Cannon added second weekly show and a Patreon-exclusive show.

In 2018, the Glass Cannon began a US Tour. The tour followed Paizo's Strange Aeons Adventure Path, which was converted to Pathfinder Second Edition in May 2022.

In Spring of 2023, the Glass Cannon Podcast launched a second campaign featuring the Pathfinder Second Edition Adventure Path Gatewalkers.

== Reviews ==
Geek & Sundry reviewed it as one of the best tabletop podcasts.
