= NY by Night =

American web series

- Genre: Horror; Urban fantasy; Actual play
- Created by: Jason Carl
- Based on: Vampire: The Masquerade 5th edition
- Starring: Jason Carl; Alexander Ward; Mayanna Berrin; Aabria Iyengar; Joey Rassool; Noura Abrahim; Michelle Nguyen Bradley; Xander Jeanneret; Cynthia Marie
- Country of origin: United States
- Original language: English
- No. of seasons: 2
- No. of episodes: 16

Production
- Production locations: Los Angeles, California
- Production company: Paradox Interactive

Original release
- Network: Twitch; YouTube
- Release: July 1 – November 18, 2022

Related
- L.A. by Night; Coteries of New York; Shadows of New York; Club Auspex (2022)

NY by Night is an American actual play web series where the cast plays as vampires using the fifth edition Vampire: The Masquerade ruleset. It is set canonically in the World of Darkness series after the events of L.A. by Night; the show is also set between the events of the visual novel video games Vampire: The Masquerade – Coteries of New York and Vampire: The Masquerade – Shadows of New York. The show focuses on different Kindred groups within New York City. Three seasons have been announced – the first season premiered on July 1, 2022; the second season premiered on September 30, 2022.

== Cast ==
- Jason Carl as the storyteller

=== Anarch coterie ===
- Alexander Ward as Isaac Brooke
- Mayanna Berrin as Serif
- Aabria Iyengar as Margot "Fuego" Walker
- Joey Rassool as Reyes Malcolm

=== Camarilla coterie ===
- Noura Abrahim as Khalida
- Michelle Nguyen Bradley as Kiếm
- Xander Jeanneret as Brawn
- Cynthia Marie as CoCo

== Premise ==
NY by Night is a sequel to the actual play web series L.A. by Night; the actual play web series uses the fifth edition of the Vampire: The Masquerade tabletop role-playing game. The show is also set between the events of the visual novel video games Vampire: The Masquerade – Coteries of New York and Vampire: The Masquerade – Shadows of New York. Carl stated that players of those video games "might recognize some familiar names and faces".

Before the premiere, World of Darkness announced the planned structure of the first three seasons. The web series follows various vampires, also known as Kindred, who live in New York City. The first season focuses on four Anarch members who chafe under the Camarilla's rules. Season two focuses on a cast of Camarilla Kindred maintaining their power in the city. Season three will bring these parallel storylines together as the two coteries collide.

== Production ==
NY by Night debuted as a production of Paradox Interactive – owner of World of Darkness intellectual property such as Vampire: The Masquerade – in July 2022. Three seasons were announced before the premiere of the first season. The show uses a simultaneous display where the audience can view everyone at the game table at the same time. Em Friedman, for Polygon, wrote that this style of display "is one of the appeals of actual play. Jason Carl (LA by Night, New York by Night) notes livestreamed or unedited live-to-tape 'draws on the improvisational skills and the role-playing skills of the players and makes it all real and immediate and genuine.' Unlike other cinematic or televisual forms, this kind of visual layout doesn't direct the viewer's eye, and different audience members may pay attention to different parts of the screen".

The show aired each Friday at 19:00 PT on the World of Darkness Twitch channel. The VOD was made available for subscribers of the World of Darkness Twitch channel immediately after airing and before being uploaded to the World of Darkness YouTube channel the following Monday, where it can be watched for free. The aftershow Club Auspex aired directly after NY by Night.

The filming of the third season has been delayed. In 2025, some members of the cast formed the Project Ghostlight group to create their own independent and non-official World of Darkness actual plays. In December 2025, Carl left Paradox.

== Episodes ==
=== Series overview ===
Season	Episodes	Originally released		
Season	Episodes	First released	Last released	Network
1	8	July 1, 2022	August 26, 2022	Twitch, YouTube
2	8	September 30, 2022	November 18, 2022	Twitch, YouTube

=== Season 1 ===
Episode	Title	Original release date	Notes
1	"Dear New York"	July 1, 2022	–
2	"Rumor of War"	June 15, 2022	–
3	"Avoided and Exploited"	July 22, 2022	Guest stars Erika Ishii
4	"Like a Graveyard"	July 29, 2022	Guest stars Shayne Eastin
5	"Darkness Clings"	August 5, 2022	Guest stars Gina DeVivo
6	"When I Am Hungry"	August 12, 2022	Guest stars Persephone Valentine
7	"A Thing With Fangs"	August 19, 2022	–
8	"Virtue Overthrow"	August 26, 2022	–

=== Season 2 ===
Episode	Title	Original release date	Notes
1	"A City That Never Sleeps"	September 30, 2022	–
2	"A Beautiful Catastrophe"	October 7, 2022	–
3	"Festivals of Babylon"	October 14, 2022	–
4	"All The Mystery"	October 21, 2022	Guest stars Becca Scott
5	"Through the Twilight"	October 28, 2022	–
6	"Someone Else Before"	November 4, 2022	Guest stars Persephone Valentine
7	"Linked With Passion"	November 11, 2022	Guest stars Josephine McAdam
8	"Made of Strife"	November 18, 2022	–

== Reception ==
Em Friedman, for Polygon in 2022, suggested that even people who've never played Vampire: The Masquerade should watch NY by Night. Friedman commented that "the show features some familiar faces and promises to be a leap forward for non-Dungeons & Dragons actual play. [...] While set in the same modern-day world as LA by Night, New York by Night will introduce a city playing by much older rules. [...] The World of Darkness is always an adult, bloody setting, but expect more struggle for survival compared to the glamour of Hollywood and the Valley". Friedman also highlighted the announced three season structure – "it's an ambitious experiment in narrative structure rarely seen in studio actual play shows, but it tracks with the company's past efforts". New York by Night was included on Polygon's 2023 "the best actual play podcasts that don’t use D&D" list — the article states that "the unflappable Carl, who has a long history in live-action role-play, has a notable talent for using geography and history to set scenes, building a shadow world on top of real-world cities we think we know, but have barely explored. New York by Night’s seasons are short but flavorful, each following a different group of young vampires, with plenty of guests that enrich the world". Polygon also included the show's third season on its "the best new actual play series coming in 2023" list.

Christian Hoffer, for ComicBook.com, commented that "actual play shows are a popular form of web entertainment, although they are dominated by Dungeons & Dragons shows. But while Dungeons & Dragons is focused mostly on external conflict between an adventuring party and enemy creatures, much of the drama in a Vampire: The Masquerade series is focused on the coterie dynamics". Hoffer highlighted that "New York by Night also benefits from being set within one of the largest cities of the world, a place filled with recognizable sites and its own personality. But the geography of the city itself also comes into play" – with the various coteries in charge of different boroughs, it can ramp up tension "when characters sneak into another faction's territory". Christopher Cruz of the Rolling Stone, in an overview of actual plays, highlighted that the "World of Darkness series show a different aspect of the TTRPG experience, with modern stories revolving clandestine factions or 'Coteries' of conflicting machinations within the dark underbelly of real-world cities. Spread across multiple independent series, beginning with 2018's L.A. By Night, which ran for five seasons, and now including off-shoots NY By Night and Seattle By Night, the scope of the world is diverse and ever growing". Cruz commented that these unscripted series are supported by Paradox Interactive so they become part of the fictional canon "of the Vampire: The Masquerade universe" and are "canonically set alongside the various multimedia extensions of the franchise, including video games, books, graphic novels, and more".
