= 100ft Robot Golf =

2016 video game

- Developer: No Goblin
- Publisher: No Goblin
- Designers: Cessia Castillo; Rebecca Ryan; Dan Teasdale
- Programmer: Dan Teasdale
- Artists: Cessia Castillo; Joule Han
- Engine: Unity
- Platforms: PlayStation 4 PlayStation VR; Windows
- Release: October 10, 2016: PS4; October 10, 2016; PSVR; October 13, 2016; Windows; March 16, 2017
- Genre: Sports
- Modes: Single-player, multiplayer

100ft Robot Golf is a 2016 sports video game developed and published by No Goblin. In the game, players control mechas and must race to shoot a golf ball into a hole. 100ft Robot Golf was released in October 2016 for PlayStation 4 and PlayStation VR and in March 2017 for Windows. The game was met with a mixed reception.

== Gameplay ==
In 100ft Robot Golf, players control giant robots and compete to shoot their golf ball into the hole.

Players choose from a number of mechas to play through golf courses with. Each mecha has different abilities and gameplay mechanics for hitting the ball. As opposed to traditional golf, all players play at the same time, with the goal of getting their ball into the hole first. Players can demolish buildings, block opposing shots with their mecha, and attack other competitors. In-game commentators (Justin, Griffin, and Travis McElroy) spectate the players' actions.

== Development and release ==
Indie studio No Goblin previously developed Roundabout in 2014. During a Let's Play of Neo Turf Masters, a member of No Goblin mentioned that a game having mechas play golf in space was never made before.

According to the co-founder of No Goblin, Dan Teasdale, the studio took anime from the 1970s and 1980s and "overdubbed it". Teasdale helped to develop Rock Band and Destroy All Humans!. No Goblin initially produced the in-game commentary themselves; however, they ultimately decided to commission the McElroy brothers because they needed people "way funnier than [them]".

Sony requested the studio to port 100ft Robot Golf to the PlayStation VR (PS VR). During the PlayStation Experience 2015 opening keynote, 100ft Robot Golf was announced for the PS VR and PlayStation 4 (PS4), stating that the game would be published by 2016. No Goblin released 100ft Robot Golf for PS4 on October 10, 2016, and for PS VR on October 13. After the studio improved the graphics and writing, the game was released for Microsoft Windows on March 16, 2017.

== Reception ==
The game has received "mixed or average" reviews, holding an aggregated score of 56 on Metacritic. On OpenCritic, the game has a "weak" approval rating of 0%.

Reception

Aggregate scores
Aggregator	Score
Metacritic	56/100
OpenCritic	0% recommend

Review scores
Publication	Score
Destructoid	4/10
GameSpot	5/10
IGN	5/10
