= Silver Marches (accessory) =

2002 role-playing game supplement

- Genre: Role-playing game
- Publisher: Wizards of the Coast
- Publication date: 2002
- Media type: Print
- ISBN: 0-7869-2835-2

Silver Marches is a supplement to the 3rd edition of the Dungeons & Dragons role-playing game.

== Contents ==
Silver Marches details the region known as the Silver Marches in the Forgotten Realms setting. The book details the towns and settlements of the burgeoning Silver Marches alliance, as well as the many hazards that threaten it.

The book notes that Silverymoon is defended by Taern Hornblade, successor to Alustriel as the High Mage of Silverymoon, with Methrammar Aerasumé of the Argent Legion, Sernius Alathar of the Knights of Silver, and Jorus Azuremantle of the Spellguard.

== Publication history ==
Silver Marches was written by Ed Greenwood and Jason Carl, and published in July 2002. Cover art was by Vance Kovacs, with interior art by Matt Cavotta, Dennis Calero, Michael Dubisch, Jeff Easley, Wayne England, Raven Mimura, Matthew Mitchell, Christopher Moeller, Puddnhead, Adam Rex, Richard Sardinha, and Arnie Swekel.

== Reception ==
The reviewer from Pyramid noted that Silver Marches is the first Forgotten Realms book "to transport a highly detailed chunk of the Realms into 3rd Edition", and called it "a worthy read for all DMs". The reviewer also commented on the appearance of the book: "The layout and art team really did a great job. The cover, with art by Vance Kovacs, is fine in both design and imagery; the wrap-around painting of an invading orc horde says a lot about the forging of the Silver Marches. Design and typography are top-notch, with few instances of text crowding and typographic errors. Prose is written with storytelling flair, rarely falling into repetitive style. The interior artwork lives up to WotC's fine reputation, and, though a few images are lacking, the varying styles give the book a dynamic feel. Of particular note are Christopher Moeller's portraiture and Adam Rex's dynamic compositions. Of course, one must always note Todd Lockwood's dragons."
