= Actual play =

Podcast or web show genre

Actual play, also called live play, is a genre of podcast or web show in which people play tabletop role-playing games (TTRPGs) for an audience. Actual play often encompasses in-character interactions between players, storytelling from the gamemaster, and out-of-character engagements such as dice rolls and discussion of game mechanics.

The genre emerged in the early 2000s. It became more popular throughout the 2010s, particularly with the 2015 debut of Critical Role, an actual play webseries featuring professional voice actors. By the 2020s, there were hundreds of actual play shows.

== History ==
According to Evan Torner writing in Watch Us Roll (2021), actual play is rooted in phenomena including magazine "play reports" of wargames and internet forums dedicated to role-playing games. With the emergence of esports, livestreamed gaming, and Let's Plays, actual plays of TTRPGs became a popular podcast and webseries format, and contributed to the resurgence of TTRPGs in the 2010s and 2020s. Academic Emily Friedman commented that many incorrectly attribute Acquisitions Incorporated (2008) as the start of actual play; however, she owns a DVD produced in 2008 which is "a recording of an even earlier set of recordings". She noted that The Bradford Players and Yog-Sothoth.com "may very well have been the first folks to record gameplay and circulate it for an audience that took entertainment value from it".

In 2008, the creators of Penny Arcade partnered with Wizards of the Coast to create a podcast of a few 4th Edition Dungeons & Dragons adventures which led to the creation of the actual play Acquisitions Incorporated. After the podcast was well-received, the players began livestreaming games starting in 2010 at the PAX festival. Acquisitions Incorporated went on to be described by Inverse in 2019 as the "longest-running live play game". Critical Role, a web series in which professional voice actors play Dungeons & Dragons, launched in 2015. Critical Role has been credited by VentureBeat as responsible for making actual play shows "their own genre of entertainment", and has since become one of the most prominent actual play series. Another popular series is The Adventure Zone (2014), a comedic actual play podcast which has featured several TTRPG systems. As of 2021, it received over 6 million monthly downloads, and ranked highly on Apple podcast charts. By 2021, there were hundreds of actual play podcasts. Many web festivals, such as New Jersey, Minnesota, Los Angeles, Baltimore, Cusco, and New Zealand, "now include actual play categories, and many have scholarship programs". Polygon highlighted that "web fest selections are quickly becoming one of the best places to discover the undersung 'ambitious middle' of actual plays — that is, shows that aspire to the same storytelling heights as the most popular troupes, but that lack the resources of time and production budget".

Early visual layouts were often either "fullscreen, edited multi-camera shows" or simultaneous-display shows with "boxes arranged on screen: one for the Storyteller or Dungeon Master, two or more for the players, either separately (in remote shows) or in groups (in studio). Another box may display character art, battle maps, sponsors, or other information". The simultaneous-display would become the most prominent layout in the genre. This visual layout is also "a holdover from video game Let's Plays"; Friedman attributed the widespread usage of the simultaneous-display layout to Critical Role's dominance in the genre as well as the layout working well for remotely filmed shows which "boomed after the move to COVID-19 pandemic protocols in 2020". Virtual tabletops (VTTs) also became more commonly used in remote shows during the pandemic lockdown. Shane Tilton, in the book Digital Culture in the Platform Era (2025), argued that there is "a direct line between" actual play shows and British panel shows. Tilton explained that panel shows "such as Taskmaster, QI, 8 out of 10 Cats, and The Last Leg" have a host who sets "up the talent to be creative through the mechanics of the game they are playing or the skits they are doing for the audience. Tabletop role-playing streams have both".

Shelly Jones, writing in The Routledge Handbook of Role-Playing Game Studies (2024), commented that actual play shows have a wide range in "production quality of editing, sets, costumes, props, and the like" as well as episode length. They noted that some shows, such as Critical Role, have an average episode length of three to four hours with "campaigns that arc over a hundred episodes" while "other hit shows like High Rollers and Dimension 20 eschew lengthy run-times and seasons". The actual play genre has also seen format changes as creators jump to "newer social media platforms such as TikTok", including adjusting the length of episodes "and incorporating special effects and interactive elements to further engage new audiences". Tilton used actual play shows "such as Dimension 20, Critical Role, and Legends of Avantris" as an example of the overall shift in streaming production quality feeling more like "professional television shows and audio works". He opined that having the talent be either professional actors and/or gaming experts is "the reason for the near professional quality of these streams", noting that actors have camera/microphone experience and gaming experts can leverage "expertise to drive their presence" on screen.

=== Licensed shows and other commercialization ===
TTRPG publishers have engaged with actual plays by licensing shows based on their products, running their own, incorporating content from actual plays back into source material, and playtesting games in actual play format. L.A. by Night is an actual play licensed by the publisher Paradox Interactive, and based on their role-playing game Vampire: The Masquerade; it premiered on Geek & Sundry in 2018. Rivals of Waterdeep is an official Wizards of the Coast actual play show, based on their Dungeons & Dragons system. Wizards of the Coast has also published collaboration sourcebooks based on actual play shows, such as the Explorer's Guide to Wildemount (2020) based on Critical Role and Acquisitions Incorporated (2019) based on the live play game by the same name.

In 2024, Jones highlighted increased commercialized in the genre, noting that many sponsorships are from tabletop gaming accessory companies. Actual play productions have also expanded their reach through merchandise and transmedia products, including game supplements, comics, novels, and animated adaptations. Tilton used the actual play Legends of Avantris by Avantris Entertainment as an example of "collaborative creativity" where the audience can "participate in the game" and influence narrative events via microtransactions. In the 2020s, various companies also created record breaking Kickstarter campaigns for TTRPG adaptations of properties originating outside the medium, such as the Cosmere Roleplaying Game becoming "the most funded tabletop game" at over $15 million in 2024 and the Dungeon Crawler Carl RPG becoming the third most funded tabletop game at over $13.29 million in May 2026. In June 2026, Avantris Entertainment's Neon Odyssey tabletop role-playing game surpassed both "by raising $16.14 million" on Kickstarter becoming "the most-funded RPG project of all-time" and "second on the all-time most funded tabletop games list".

== Cultural impact ==
In 2018, the Diana Jones Award for excellence in tabletop gaming named the concept of actual play as that year's award winner, marking the first year the award was not awarded to a game, organization, or individual. Academic Emily Friedman, writing for Los Angeles Review of Books, highlighted that "there's the elemental pleasure of being told a story, intertwined with the alchemy of watching that story be created in front of your eyes (or ears). [...] We perceive simultaneously the character played and the player playing". Friedman also commented that the largest "actual plays have viewer numbers that are the envy of some television networks". Amanda Farough wrote for VentureBeat that "the boundaries and barriers that have traditionally kept TTRPGs hidden behind an opaque divide have come tumbling down" and that actual play "long-form narrative is reshaping itself as an expression of both players and the audiences that accompany them on the journey ahead". Curtis D. Carbonell, in his book the Dread Trident: Tabletop Role-Playing Games and the Modern Fantastic, commented that shows such as Acquisitions Incorporated and Critical Role reflect "a wider phenomenon made clear by numerous Youtube.com videos of individual gaming sessions by random groups ... The confluence of these digital and analog streamed elements adds to the increasing archive of realized gametexts that can be consumed and analyzed with the modern fantastic". Both Farough and Carbonell highlighted that actual play shows have also increased sales of TTRPGs and related products.

Actual plays have contributed towards improving representation of people of color, women, and others in tabletop gaming, which has had a reputation of being primarily made up of white men. Maze Arcana's Sirens, with Satine Phoenix as dungeonmaster (DM), features an all-women group of players. Rivals of Waterdeep, DMed by Tanya DePass, and Into the Motherlands are actual play shows with casts that are entirely made up of people of color. Death2Divinity is an actual play show with an all-queer, "all fat-babe" cast. Actual play shows have also been credited with improving representation of LGBT people in media more generally. Entertainment website CBR has said that LGBT representation has been more easily incorporated into actual plays because they are often produced by independent creators and distributed online. The site named The Adventure Zone and Dimension 20 as two examples of actual plays which include LGBT characters.

Tilton highlighted the fan interaction with the actual play Legends of Avantris, from microtransactions to chat participation on the narrative. He noted that the streamer has transformed "their broadcasts into shared creative experiences by embracing collaborative creativity with their audience". He argued that this type of collaboration both "enrich[s] the content" and strengthens "the bond between the creators and their community" which then fosters "a sense of ownership and shared identity among fans". Academic Melissa Allen, in the Journal of Fandom Studies, wrote that "viewers often feel it is their right to address happenings in-game they do not like because they too are an active participant despite being viewers, not players", which has led actual play series to carefully navigate when to let fan conversations occur freely and when to intervene directly. In particular, she highlighted the problematic treatment of female players in fan discourse – "there is a small window in terms of mechanics knowledge fans find appropriate" for female players, noting that these players "have to be extremely knowledgeable of game mechanics to an almost impossible extent, but they cannot be so outwardly knowledgeable that they challenge men's standing as arbiters of D&D knowledge". Allen commented that fan criticisms often "reflect the unease when women and their characters are the focus of the campaign's story". Allen also stated that "despite the presence of these gatekeeping behaviours and comments that reflected misogynistic discourse, there were many that applauded the female players" in actual plays with fans who frequently challenged sexist discourse, "indicating that male preserve-sanctioned behaviours are actively pushed back against by many in the fandom".

=== Adaptations ===
The Critical Role animated series The Legend of Vox Machina was crowdfunded on Kickstarter in 2019, where it raised US$11.39 million, setting the record for the most highly funded film or TV project in the platform's history. Following this, Amazon streaming service Prime Video acquired exclusive streaming rights to the series. The second Critical Role animated series adaptation, The Mighty Nein, has premiered on November 19, 2025. Critical Role has also released multiple comic book series based on their show.

The "Balance" campaign of The Adventure Zone was adapted into a series of graphic novels, the first of which was published in 2018. The "Fantasy High" campaign of Dimension 20 was adapted as a webcomic; it was first released on Webtoon in 2025. In 2026, Worlds Beyond Number ran a successful Kickstarter campaign to create a prelude graphic novel adaptation based on their "The Wizard, The Witch, & The Wild One" campaign.

=== SAG-AFTRA ===
During the 2023 SAG-AFTRA strike, Charlie Hall of Polygon commented that "actual play, which has grown in popularity since well before the pandemic, has often pulled in Hollywood types to fill seats at the table. But neither SAG-AFTRA nor AMPTP is regularly involved in the productions that Polygon spoke with, and therefore they will not be affected". Justin Carter, for Gizmodo, stated it was tricky as the "fate of an Actual Play show depends on the company behind it, and possibly what platform it's released on" – shows such as Dimension 20 on the streaming service Dropout and Purple Worm! Kill! Kill! on the "upcoming 24-hour Dungeons & Dragons Adventure streaming channel" are impacted by the strike as they "fall under SAG's Electronic Media contract, and are thus shut down". However, other actual plays such as Critical Role and shows on the Glass Cannon Network were not impacted by the strike. Christian Hoffer, for ComicBook.com, explained that YouTube and Twitch channels appear to be a "grey area" so "Critical Role and most Actual Play shows that air exclusively on YouTube and Twitch do not appear to impacted by the SAG-AFTRA strike, while productions like Dimension 20 that hire talent and airs on a closed platform (i.e., one that's not open to anyone to post content on) are impacted by the SAG-AFTRA strike". In August 2023, Sam Reich announced that all Dropout shows (including Dimension 20) have resumed production as it was determined that their "New Media Agreement for Non-Dramatic Programming" was actually a non-struck SAG-AFTRA contract.

== List of actual play media ==
Title	Year	Ref.
Acquisitions Incorporated	2008–present	
The Adventure Zone	2014–present	
Candela Obscura	2023–2024	
Critical Role	2015–present	
Oxventurer's Guild	2017–present	
Dark Dice	2018–present	
DesiQuest	2023–2024	
Dimension 20	2018–present	
Dungeons & Daddies	2019–present	
Exandria Unlimited	2021–2025	
Friends at the Table	2014–present	
The Glass Cannon	2015–present	
HarmonQuest	2016–2019	
L.A. by Night	2018–2021	
Natural Six	2024–present	
Nerd Poker	2012–present	
Not Another D&D Podcast	2018–present	
NY by Night	2022	
Rivals of Waterdeep	2018–2022	
Worlds Beyond Number	2023–present	

== See also ==
- Fantasy podcast
