= Jasmine Bhullar =

American actress, streamer and gamemaster

- Other name: ThatBronzeGirl
- Occupations: Actress; Gamemaster; Streamer; Writer
- Notable work: DesiQuest; Dimension 20: Coffin Run; The Re-Slayer's Take; Seattle by Night
- Awards: 2025 ENNIE Award, Silver Winner for Best Monster/Adversary

Jasmine Bhullar, also known as ThatBronzeGirl, is an American actress, writer, streamer, and gamemaster. Bhullar is the creator of the actual play web series DesiQuest. She has also developed and appeared on other actual play series such as Dimension 20: Coffin Run (2022), BuzzFeed's Magic & Stuff (2024), and the Critical Role spin-off The Re-Slayer's Take (2024).

== Career ==
Bhullar was the gamemaster (GM) for her first actual play campaign for Geek & Sundry's Starter Kit for Vampire the Masquerade in 2018. In 2019, she was a player on the Geek & Sundry series Relics and Rarities which was led by Deborah Ann Woll. She was a player on the Vampire: The Masquerade actual play Seattle by Night which premiered in 2019. She also co-developed the forthcoming Afrofuturist tabletop role-playing game (TTRPG) Into the Mother Lands, created by Tanya DePass, which premiered as an actual play in 2020. Bhullar was the Storyteller for Court of Cups, a Vampire: The Masquerade actual-play series produced by Penny Arcade that ran for forty-eight episodes.

Bhullar created the actual play Shikar, based on Dungeons & Dragons 5th edition, and streamed the campaign live on her Twitch channel under her handle ThatBronzeGirl in 2021; she was the Dungeon Master (DM). The series did not initially have sponsors, but she was approached for sponsorship opportunities over time. She next DM'd for D&D Beyond's Battle for Beyond miniseries.

Bhullar was the DM for Dimension 20's 14th season Coffin Run, which premiered in June 2022. She created the campaign with the intention of mixing comedy and a central cast of vampires à la "What We Do In The Shadows meets Young Frankenstein." Madison Durham of Polygon praised the campaign for making something "wonderfully new" from elements typically seen in vampire-centered media productions. Bhullar created the actual play web series DesiQuest with intention of honoring her culture and creating space to play with other South Asian people. In 2022, she pitched the idea to Sandeep Parikh, owner of the production company EffinFunny, and they used Kickstarter to fund the project. They raised 150k for DesiQuest, which premiered on YouTube in November 2023.

In March 2023, she played in Acquisitions Incorporated for the Dungeons & Dragons actual play's 15th anniversary. Bhullar was a player in the second season of Seattle by Night which premiered in October 2023. Also in 2023, she was the DM for an episode of Faster, Purple Worm! Kill! Kill! with players Matthew Lillard, Anjali Bhimani, Michael Irby, and Omega Jones. In 2024, BuzzFeed released their first D&D actual play series Magic & Stuff, featuring an all-queer cast, and for which Bhullar was the DM. She worked with the director Derek Benig to create the concept. Also in 2024, Bhullar was a player in the Critical Role podcast spin-off The Re-Slayer's Take. Bhullar contributed a short story in the Dungeons & Dragons retrospective book Worlds & Realms: Adventures from Greyhawk to Faerûn and Beyond (2024).

Bhullar was co-author on the role-playing game bestiary Big Bads Box Set for Hit Point Press, which won the 2025 Silver ENNIE Award for "Best Monster/Adversary". In July 2025, Bhullar appeared in a comedic segment titled Dimension 20: On a Bus! in the Game Changer episode "Fool's Gold"; this segment featured a poorly run TTRPG led by Katie Marovitch. For April Fools' Day in 2026, Dropout released a one-episode follow-up titled Dimension 20 On a Bus: Season 2. Starting in April 2026, Bhullar became the DM of the new Wizards of the Coast actual play Dungeon Masters. Francesco Cacciatore of Polygon commented that she is a "great choice of DM for Wizards' approach" of short episodes which require "a strong hold on the steering wheel". Cacciatore called her "the most serious and traditional" in the "roster of 'celebrity DMs'", noting her command of the table via "excellent knowledge of the rules". The series returned with a second campaign starting on July 8, 2026.

== Personal life ==
Bhullar wanted to be a scifi/fantasy writer from age six. She is Punjabi and of Sikh faith. She first played Dungeons & Dragons with a former romantic partner and an all-male group of players. Although she did not have a positive experience with this group, she enjoyed the experience of creating a character.

== Accolades ==
- 2025 – Silver Winner, ENNIE Award for Best Monster/Adversary (for BIG BADS Box Set)
