= List of Dungeons & Dragons web series =

Wizards of the Coast has created, produced and sponsored multiple web series featuring Dungeons & Dragons. These shows have typically aired on the official Dungeons & Dragons Twitch and YouTube channels as well as the Dungeons & Dragons Adventures FAST channel. Some have been adapted into podcasts.

== Overview ==
In 2008, the creators of Penny Arcade partnered with Wizards of the Coast to create a podcast of a few 4th Edition Dungeons & Dragons adventures which led to the creation of Acquisitions Incorporated. After the podcast was well-received, the players began livestreaming games starting in 2010 at the PAX festival. Academic Emily Friedman, writing for Los Angeles Review of Books in 2023, discussed the origins and evolution of this show, noting that "every iteration has included D&D staff as part of its cast"; she explained the show "was 'official' but never acquired by" Wizards of the Coast and remains independent with its creators owning the intellectual property. According to Friedman, this model – "with a few exceptions" – became Wizards of the Coast's "playbook" for engaging with actual play productions.

Greg Tito, a senior communications manager for Dungeons & Dragons, explained he wanted to develop actual play shows after watching the success of the independent web series The Adventure Zone (launched in 2014) and Critical Role (launched in 2015) which led Wizards of the Coast to develop and launch Dice, Camera, Action in 2016. Tito said that show was "insanely popular" and "the success of that allowed us to create relationships with smaller tabletop roleplayers that were in front of an audience. The entire ecosystem began to grow from there". Friedman argued that while "Tito developed Dice, Camera, Action! (2016–19) in-house and fostered Rivals of Waterdeep" (2018–22), most of the company's involvement took the form of promotional support such as live-streamed "events tied to D&D content releases between 2018 and 2020" and interviews on Tito's and Shelly Mazzanoble's Dragon Talk podcast. According to Hasbro CEO Brian Goldner, viewers on Twitch and YouTube spent over 150 million hours watching D&D gameplay in 2020. Academic Emma French, in Real Life in Real Time: Live Streaming Culture (2023), highlighted that in 2020 "no actual play live streams hosted by the official DnD channel featured an all-male cast—showing a massive shift from the brand ambassadors endorsed by Wizards of the Coast" previously.

Christian Hoffer of ComicBook.com and Friedman both noted that by 2022, official streaming shows were no longer financially supported by Wizards of the Coast which included "the long-running Rivals of Waterdeep and The Black Dice Society (2021–22)", shifting instead to occasional funding for miniseries and standalone "one shot" episodes. Hoffer highlighted previous promotional cycles for Dungeons & Dragons sourcebooks included actual play shows, however, Wizards of the Coast "barely promoted the December 2022 release of Dragonlance: Shadow of the Dragon Queen with any sort of live play show save for a single one-shot hosted at PAX Unplugged" and "the once-thriving Dungeons & Dragons Twitch channel has been mostly offline for months, with Wizards' few sponsored shows wrapping up their campaigns last year or continuing on without Wizards' support". He also commented on the shift towards a celebrity focus at Dungeons & Dragons live events.

In November 2023, Hasbro's Entertainment One launched the Dungeons & Dragons Adventures FAST channel, available on platforms such as Amazon Freevee and Plex, which featured new web series, reruns of the animated Dungeons & Dragons series, and reruns of other Dungeons & Dragons web series. Hasbro sold eOne's entertainment assets to Lionsgate with the deal closed on December 27, 2023.

In April 2026, Wizards of the Coast launched a new actual play titled Dungeon Masters with Jasmine Bhullar as the DM. Following the show's announcement, Francesco Cacciatore of Polygon noted it has "been years since D&D had an ongoing, official actual play, produced and managed by" Wizards of the Coast". In July 2026, both Jack Coleman of TheGamer and Alex Evans of Wargamer noted Wizards of the Coast's expanded presence at the upcoming 2026 Gen Con, including multiple scheduled live games, following several years of a limited presence at the annual convention.

== Actual play series ==
A Dungeons & Dragons actual play series is a show where the cast plays the game and features a Dungeon Master (DM) who guides the narrative.

=== 2010s ===
Year	Campaign	Episodes	Cast	Description	Ref.
2015–2016	Out of the Abyss Live	12	Greg Tito as the DM	An adventure in the Underdark based on the Out of the Abyss module.	
2016–2019	Dice, Camera, Action!	141	Chris Perkins as the DM; Anna Prosser; Holly Conrad; Jared Knabenbauer; Nathan Sharp	A live play-through of the latest storylines of Dungeon & Dragons. D&D Presents was the announced replacement show.	
2016	Force Grey: Giant Hunters	6	Chris Hardwick as Whil Wee-tawn (Sun Elf Wizard); Ashley Johnson as Dagny Halvor (Half-Orc Cleric of Gond); Shelby Fero as Brawlwin Chainminer (Dwarf Fighter); Jonah Ray as Joppa (Human Monk); Utkarsh Ambudkar as Hitch (Human Rogue); Brian Posehn as Calliope (Half-Elf Bard); Matthew Mercer as the DM	Co-produced by Legendary Digital. An adventure based on the Storm King’s Thunder module.	
2016–2017	Misscliks D&D: Risen	20	Nadja Otikor; Brit Weisman; Kelly Link; Steven Lumpkin; Neal Erickson; Kurtis J. Wiebe	Co-produced with Misscliks.	
2017	Destiny & Doom	8	Lauren Urban as the DM; Jack Pattillo; Mica Burton; Criken; Dante Basco	A homebrew campaign.	
2017–2019	Encounter Roleplay: Learn By Play	38	Will Jones as the DM	Jones and the cast play Dungeons & Dragons with pauses to give tips to both DMs and players. In season 1, they play Tomb of Annihilation; in season 2, they play a homebrew game; in season 3, they play Waterdeep: Dragon Heist.	
2017–2018	Force Grey: Lost City of Omu	20	Matthew Mercer as the DM; Joe Manganiello as Arkhan (Dragonborn Paladin); Deborah Ann Woll as Jamilah (Human Barbarian); Dylan Sprouse as Tyril Tallguy (Firbolg Druid); Utkarsh Ambudkar as Hitch (Human Rogue); Brian Posehn as Calliope (Half-Elf Bard)	An adventure based on the Tomb of Annihilation module featuring a couple of returning characters from Force Grey: Giant Hunters.	
2017–2020	Girls Guts Glory	42	Kelly D'Angelo as the DM; Kimberly Hidalgo; Kelen Coleman; Alice Greczyn; Erika Hidalgo; Rachel Seeley; Allie Gonino; Sujata Day	An all female RPG group whose show moved to the Dungeons & Dragons channels.	
2017–2018	Heroes' Graveyard	24	Neal Pass Erickson (a.k.a. Koibu); Jeffrey Shih (a.k.a. Trump)	Trump and Koibu guide a rotating cast using the Meatgrinder Mode rule system featured in Tomb of Annihilation.	
2017	HighRollers: Uncharted Territory	10	Mara Holmes as the DM; Chris Trott; Kim Richards; Matthew Toffolo	A spin-off of the HighRollers D&D series sponsored by Wizards of the Coast to promote the Tomb of Annihilation adventure.	
2017	HighRollers: Dead Reckoning	12	Mara Holmes as the DM; Chris Trott; Katie Morrison; Kim Richards; Tom Hazell	A sponsored prequel campaign to HighRollers: Uncharted Territory which focuses on how the Harpers discovered the death curse.	
2017	Maze Arcana: Fury's Reach	12	Satine Phoenix as the DM; Ruty Rutenberg as the DM	Co-produced with Maze Arcana. The campaign features two groups of different players with two separate Dungeon Masters. Each group can simultaneously impact the world and each other. The story is continued in Maze Arcana: Fury's Fate.	
2017–2018	Maze Arcana: Fury's Fate	12	Satine Phoenix as the DM; Ruty Rutenberg as the DM	Co-produced with Maze Arcana. A sequel campaign dealing with the aftermath of Maze Arcana: Fury's Reach.	
2017	One Grung Above	8	Chris Lindsay as the DM; Satine Phoenix; Ruty Rutenberg; Lauren Urban; Cig Neutron	A play-through of Tome of Annihilation where the players are all grungs.	
2017–2018	Roll20 Presents: Tomb of Annihilation	42	Adam Koebel as the DM; DistractedElf; Bluejay; Andrew Gillis; Dave "Human" Snell	A Roll20 Presents series sponsored by Wizards of the Coast to promote the Tomb of Annihilation module on Roll20.	
2017–2019	Sirens of the Realms	36	Satine Phoenix as the DM; Maude Garrett; Amy Vorpahl; Vivid Vivka; Kate Elliott	Co-produced with Maze Arcana. The campaign features an all-girl bard band on adventures through the Forgotten Realms.	
2017–2018	The Dragon Friends in Tomb of Annihilation	20	David Harmon as the DM; Ben Jenkins; Simon Greiner; Alex Lee; Edan Lacey; Benny Davis; Michael Hing	A spin-off of the Dragon Friends series sponsored by Wizards of the Coast to promote the Tomb of Annihilation module.	
2018	Assassin	11	Neal Pass Erickson (a.k.a. Koibu) as the DM	A single-player campaign based in a homebrewed world with a rotating cast of players who act as assassins on behalf of the god of chaos.	
2018	Clerical Error	9	Lauren Urban as the DM; Meris Mulalley; Greg Tito; Trick Jarrett; Demitrios Feredinos; Michelle Sutterfield	A campaign set in Waterdeep. Many members of the cast work on Magic: The Gathering.	
2018	Dark & Dicey	22	Kaiji Tang as the DM; Nathan Sharp as Pluck (Kenku druid); Hunter Hughes as Kovacs (half-elf paladin); Cristina Vee as Anya (Yuan-ti pureblood warlock); Anna Brisbin as Trixa (halfling barbarian); Zach Callison as Werblund (gnome ranger)	A villain campaign centered around a shipwrecked group who are stuck on the Blacksteel Isles, a tyrannical Mageocracy.	
2018	Dice Friends: Dragon's Orders	8	Dale Friesen as the DM; Kathleen De Vere as Morra; Graham Stark as Snak; Paul Saunders as Dande; Brendan "Beej" Dery as Bontan	Co-produced with LoadingReadyRun. An adventure set in Waterdeep after the group escaped Chult.	
2018–2019	Fistful of Platinum	7	Alan Patrick as the DM; Michael Konas; Lindsey Rode; Jessie Swinton; Trisha Kosloski; Jennifer Patrick	A campaign that utilizes the Waterdeep: Dragon Heist Platinum Edition from Beadle & Grimm.	
2018	Hell's Belles	15	Marisa Turmaine as the DM; Shauna Nakasone as Levity (Tiefling Monk); Chloe Christine as Lyra (Tiefling Paladin); Hadeel Al Misari as Miga (Tiefling Rogue); Holly Conrad as Durge (Tiefling Bard); Lysa Chen as Mercy (Tiefling Sorcerer); TK Johnson as Gille (Tiefling Paladin); Kayla Cline as Pentar (Tiefling Druid)	An all tiefling player group on an adventure around the planes with a cast of female and non-binary players.	
2018	High Rollers: Rogue's Gambit	12	Mara Holmes as the DM; Tom Hazell; Chris Trott; Katie Morrison; Kim Richards	A spin-off of the HighRollers D&D series sponsored by Wizards of the Coast to promote the Waterdeep: Dragon Heist adventure. Each player is a member of the Harpers and has at least a single level in the Rogue class.	
2018–2019	Maze Arcana: Inkwell Society (Season 2)	13	Ruty Rutenberg as the DM; Kyle Vogt; Kim Horcher; Cig Neutron; Satine Phoenix; Kai Norman	Co-produced with Maze Arcana. A noir campaign set in the city of Sharn in the Eberron campaign setting.	
2018–2022	Rivals of Waterdeep	115	Aram Vartian; Carlos Luna; Cicero Holmes; Tanya DePass; Shareef Jackson; Surena Marie; Brandon Stennis; LaTia Jacquise; Masood Haque; Eugenio Vargas; Brian Gray	A rotating cast of predominantly women and people of color where the Dungeon Master changes each season. The show has played through modules such as Waterdeep: Dragon Heist and Baldur's Gate: Descent Into Avernus.	
2018–2019	Roll20 Presents: Waterdeep: Dragon Heist	19	Adam Koebel as the DM; Bluejay; Dave "Human" Snell; DistractedElf; Lauren Bond (a.k.a. RandomTuesday)	A Roll20 Presents series sponsored by Wizards of the Coast to promote the Waterdeep: Dragon Heist module on Roll20.	
2018	Trapped in the Birdcage	23	Holly Conrad as the DM; Jimmy Whetzel as Saturn (Human Bard); Anna Prosser Robinson as Wilhelmina (Human Rogue); Hadeel al-Massari as Nejma (Elf Wizard); Chad Quandt as Reader (Warforged Rogue)	DM Holly Conrad guides the players through adventures in Sigil, a city at the center of the multiverse, using the Planescape campaign setting.	
2018–2019	The Broken Pact	30	Reuben Bresler as the DM; Riley Silverman as Velma Sweet (Half-elf Bard); Ashlen Rose as Tutturu (Loxodon Cleric); Gaurav Gulati as Lucian Ladrian (Human Cleric); Jordan Pridgen as Astorok (Minotaur Fighter)	Co-produced with Saving Throw. Features adventures using the Guildmasters' Guide to Ravnica and the Baldur's Gate: Descent into Avernus sourcebooks. The show's fourth season aired in 2021 on the Saving Throw's channels, but it was still sponsored by Wizards of the Coast.	
2019–2020	Dark Lanterns	10	Gaurav Gulati as the DM; Tyler Rhoades as Pulver (Warforged Barbarian); Ashlen Rose as Ghost (Changeling Wizard); Xander Jeanneret as Waltz (Halfling Bard); Meghan Caves as Gadget (Gnome Artificer)	Co-produced with Saving Throw. The campaign is set in Eberron and features the Eberron: Rising from the Last War sourcebook.	
2019	Descent into Avernus: Blood War	12	Guy Sclanders as the DM; Michael Kesavan; Mhaire Stritter; Janet Blythe; Jenny Andersson; Caeora	Presented by How to be a Great GM's Guy Sclanders. Features the Baldur's Gate: Descent into Avernus module.	
2019	Dice Friends: Bylaw & Order	10	Kathleen De Vere; Cameron Lauder; Ian Horner; Ben Ulmer; Serge Yager	Co-produced with LoadingReadyRun. An adventure set in Ravnica.	
2019	Dragon Friends Adventure into the Upside Down	4	Dave Harmon as the DM; Michael Hing; Edan Lacey; Simon Greiner; Jordan Raskopoulos; Tom Walker; Alex Lee	A Dragon Friends series sponsored by Wizards of the Coast to promote the Stranger Things Dungeons & Dragons Roleplaying Game Starter Set.	
2019	Eberron: Gateway to Perdition	3	Adam Koebel as the DM; Katie Mae; TK Johnson; William White; Masood Muhammad Haque	A Roll20 Presents limited series sponsored by Wizards of the Coast to promote the Eberron: Rising from the Last War sourcebook on Roll20.	
2019	Ghosts of Saltmarsh: Call of the Kraken	12	Guy Sclanders as the DM; Mhaire Stritter; Caeora; Michael Kesavan; Janet Blythe; Jenny Andersson	Presented by How to be a Great GM's Guy Sclanders. Features the Ghosts of Saltmarsh anthology.	
2019	giffgaff Gaming Presents Ghosts of Saltmarsh	3	Aoife Wilson as the DM; Skinny Malone; Jordan YV; TCODANK; Javvyluu	Presented by giffgaff. Features an adventure from the Ghosts of Saltmarsh anthology.	
2019–2020	Heroes of Baldur's Gate: The Black Net	7	Mháire Stritter as the DM; Julia Klein; Eric Daniels; Max Cannings	Members of the German Orkenspalter TV group play the DMs Guild adventure Heroes of Baldur's Gate (2019).	
2019	High Rollers: Lightfall's Descent	10	Mara Holmes as the DM; Kim Richards; Chris Trott; Rhiannon Frost; Katie Morrison; Tom Hazell	A spin-off of the HighRollers D&D series sponsored by Wizards of the Coast to promote the Baldur's Gate: Descent into Avernus adventure. It is a high level campaign featuring Mara Holmes' campaign setting Lightfall.	
2019	I Speak Giant: Descent into Avernus	3	Zac Naoum as the DM; Joel Rennie; Letofski; Felicia McEntire; Luke Lancaster	A spin-off of the I Speak Giant series sponsored by Wizards of the Coast to promote the Baldur's Gate: Descent into Avernus module.	
2019	Monsters & Fables	6	T. J. Storm as the DM; Jennifer Kretchmer; Francis Capra; Rachel Miner; Omar Najam	The lost players battle mythic foes.	
2019–2020	RealmSmith: Into the Mist (Season 1 & 2)	28	Jason Azevedo as the DM; Joel Auge as Falpher Softfoot; Melanie Hepburn as Callie Lahwey; Adam Mainse as Dmitri Maddock; Brandon Perkins as Sterling; David Shaheen as Rone Talrythian; David Morin as Muskoka; Matthew Mercer as Strahd von Zarovich; Noura Ibrahim as Ezmerelda	Co-produced with RealmSmith. The players find themselves trapped in the land of Barovia (part of the Ravenloft campaign setting). The show's third & fourth seasons aired on the RealmSmith's channels.	
2019	Roll 20 Presents: Waterdeep: Dungeon of the Mad Mage	17	Adam Koebel as the DM; Bluejay; Dave "Human" Snell; DistractedElf; Lauren Bond (a.k.a. RandomTuesday)	A Roll20 Presents series sponsored by Wizards of the Coast to promote the Waterdeep: Dungeon of the Mad Mage module on Roll20.	
2019–2020	Roll20 Presents: Baldur's Gate: Descent into Avernus	26	Adam Koebel as the DM; Bluejay; Dave "Human" Snell; DistractedElf; Lauren Bond (a.k.a. RandomTuesday)	A Roll20 Presents series sponsored by Wizards of the Coast to promote the Baldur's Gate: Descent into Avernus module on Roll20.	
2019	Roll20 Presents: Ghosts of Saltmarsh: The Final Enemy	5	Adam Koebel as the DM; Bluejay; Dave "Human" Snell; DistractedElf; Lauren Bond (a.k.a. RandomTuesday)	A Roll20 Presents series sponsored by Wizards of the Coast to promote the Ghosts of Saltmarsh anthology on Roll20.	
2019–2020	Roll20 Presents: Jace Beleren Must Die	41	Adam Koebel as the DM; Carlos Luna; Katie Mae; TK Johnson; Masood Muhammad Haque	A Roll20 Presents series sponsored by Wizards of the Coast to promote the Guildmasters' Guide to Ravnica sourcebook on Roll20. The party sets off to kill the Planeswalker Jace Beleren.	
2019–2020	Tales from the Mists	36	TK Johnson as the DM; Lysa Chen; Kayla Cline; Hadeel Al-Massari; Ashley Warren	The first season was set in the city of Harmonia in the Kartakass Domain of Dread; each character is from a different domain of Ravenloft. The cast includes four core players "plus two rotating party slots filled by new players every four episodes".	

=== 2020s ===
Year	Campaign	Episodes	Cast	Description	Ref.
2020–2021	A Darkened Wish	30	B. Dave Walters as the DM; Mayleigh Damage as Helene; D'Artagnan Mattaliano as Xander; Alcuin Gersh as Rayonde; AKI as Karrin/Kerrin; Sam de Leve as Aiden	A campaign based on the comic A Darkened Wish (2019) written by B. Dave Walters with art by Tess Fowler. It is set in the Moonshae Isles and features characters from the comic.	
2020	D&D Presents: TORCH	1	Chris Perkins as the DM; Mica Burton; Jonathan Indovino; Anna Prosser; Nathan Sharp	An announced replacement show for Dice, Camera, Action!, but was cancelled in 2020 after its character introduction episode at PAX Unplugged 2019. Nights of Eveningstar (2020) became the replacement show with some cast overlap.	
2020	Holiday Specials 2020	5		A series of holiday one-shots.	
2020	Indoor Recess	22	TK Johnson as the DM; Katie Mae; Carlos Luna; C'loni Bailey; Masood Haque	Co-produced with Indoor Recess. The campaign utilizes the Mythic Odysseys of Theros sourcebook on Roll20.	
2020	Mythic Encounters In Theros	3	Chris Lindsay as the DM	A series of high-level one-shot encounters featuring the three new Mythic level monsters presented in Mythic Odysseys of Theros.	
2020–2022	Nights of Eveningstar	63	Mara Holmes as the DM; Mica Burton as Azara Mithras; Jonathan Indovino as Tarkhal Crownsilver; Anna Prosser as Agnis Crownsilver; Nathan Sharp as Marcel	The announced replacement show for D&D Presents. The campaign begins in the village of Eveningstar and has Arthurian themes. The show's fourth and fifth seasons aired on both the Penny Arcade YouTube channel and on the Dungeons & Dragons channels.	
2020	Roll20 Presents: Lost Mine of Phandelver	14	Dave "Human" Snell as the DM; Lauren Bond (a.k.a. RandomTuesday); AKI; DistractedElf; Aabria Iyengar	A Roll20 Presents series sponsored by Wizards of the Coast to promote the Starter Set on Roll20.	
2020–2021	Roll20 Presents: Rime of the Frostmaiden	13	DistractedElf as the DM; Gabe Hicks; AKI; Dave "Human" Snell; Aabria Iyengar	A Roll20 Presents series sponsored by Wizards of the Coast to promote the Icewind Dale: Rime of the Frostmaiden module on Roll20.	
2020	Tides of Wildemount	13	Jason Azevedo as the DM; Joel Auge as Plunkrawk; Melanie Hepburn as Aella; Christina Laurice as Gaziel; Adam Mainse as Bolt; David Morin as Bacalhau; Brandon Perkins as Snow	Co-produced with RealmSmith. The campaign utilizes the Explorer's Guide to Wildemount sourcebook and is set in the world of Exandria.	
2021–2022	The Black Dice Society	56	B. Dave Walters as the DM; Tanya DePass; Noura Ibrahim; Deejay Knight; Mark Meer; Saige Ryan; Becca Scott	Two season campaign set across multiple Domains of Dread in Ravenloft and showcases the Van Richten's Guide to Ravenloft sourcebook.	
2022	Champions Of The Realm	7	Jason Azevedo as the DM; Urijah Faber as a commentator; Becca Scott as a commentator; Bruce Buffer as the announcer; Deborah Ann Woll as Jamilah; Mark Meer as Baeloth; Matthew Lillard as Beadle; Noura Ibrahim as Ezmerelda; Omega Jones as Hew Mann; Satine Phoenix as Vlahnya; Alicia Marie as Barrowin; Anna Prosser as Evelyn	A limited series where the characters participate in a PVP battle royal tournament. Co-produced with RealmSmith and Lost Odyssey Events.	
2022	Legends of the Multiverse	20	Deborah Ann Woll as Sunny; B. Dave Walters as Kaiho Karoshi; Gina Darling as Bac Si; Meagan Kenreck as Riddle; Todd Kenreck as Torven	A series originally set in the Spelljammer campaign setting; the players eventually visited Dragonlance. Each arc had a different dungeon master and the show featured guest stars such as Brennan Lee Mulligan, Aabria Iyengar, Ginny Di, Anna Prosser, Deejay Knight, Emme Montgomery, Travis McElroy, SungWon Cho, and Jim Zub.	
2023–2024	Encounter Party	22	Landree Fleming as Asher; Andrew Krug as Dryddian; Ned Donovan as Flik; Khary Payton as Tolo; Sarah Babe as Ulavina; Brian David Judkins as the Dungeon Master; David Lee Huynh as Vinh Erikson von Longstrider	Encounter Party was originally an independent podcast; the show's second campaign launched on the Dungeons & Dragons Adventures FAST channel in November 2023. It is set in the Forgotten Realms.	
2023–2024	Faster, Purple Worm! Kill! Kill!	20	Bill Rehor as the Host	An improv comedy series, featuring "a revolving cast of special guests and celebrities", which focuses on level 1 adventurers "marching to their certain deaths as they face beasts against which they stand absolutely no chance". It launched on the Dungeons & Dragons Adventures FAST channel in November 2023.	
2026	Dungeon Masters	23	Jasmine Bhullar as the Dungeon Master; Mayanna Berrin as Wesley (C1), Sapphira Horayas (C2), Talonia (C3); Christian Navarro as Eloin Emberleaf (C1), Cadmus Pennypetal (C2), Mistik & Argo Breakhorn (C3); Neil Newbon as Professor Crem de la Crem (C1), Sailor (C2), Greave (C3); Theo Solomon as Rokkar (C3); Devora Wilde as Zora Thornska (C1), "Princess" Hobnip (C2), Jandi (C3)	A series showcasing official, unreleased D&D content with corresponding "Play-Along Packs" then released on D&D Beyond. The first campaign, as part of the "Season of Horror", featured the Ravenloft: The Horrors Within (2026) sourcebook before it was published and ran for 12 episodes. The second campaign featured the (then) upcoming Arcana Unleashed (2026) sourcebook and the players as new characters, and ran 9 episodes. The third campaign featured the World of Warcraft (2026) sourcebook, added Theo Solomon as a full cast member, and is scheduled to run for 11 episodes.	

== Events ==
Wizards of the Coast has run Dungeons & Dragons themed events to announce new storylines and products which feature many streamed shows over the course of the event. Some official web series have been piloted at these events.

Date	Title	Description	Ref.
June 2–3, 2017	Stream of Annihilation	This event announced the Tomb of Annihilation storyline. It featured "livestreaming groups such as Acquisitions Incorporated's C Team from Penny Arcade, High Rollers, Misscliks, Maze Arca, a group of women actors known as Girls Guts Glory, and others. Dungeon Masters include D&D's Chris Perkins, Chris Lindsay, and Mike Mearls (who all work on the storylines and led the creation of 5th Edition)".	
June 1–3, 2018	Stream of Many Eyes	This event announced the Waterdeep storyline. Featured a ticketed in-person event with a recreation of a city block from Waterdeep with shops, performers, and live music. The event hosted ten live-streamed sessions of Dungeons & Dragons, some of which featured internet personalities while others featured celebrities. Some of the games featured popular D&D streamers, including Critical Role, Dice, Camera, Action!, High Rollers, and Girls, Guts, Glory. Celebrities like Joe Manganiello and Deborah Ann Woll played alongside these established figures. Alongside this were numerous interviews conducted with many iconic players about their experiences with the game, as well as Wizards of the Coast staff. This event won the Content Marketing Institute's 2019 award for best "In-Person (Event) Content Marketing Strategy".	
May 17–19, 2019	D&D Live 2019: The Descent	This event announced the Descent into Avernus storyline and the Eberron: Rising from the Last War sourcebook. It streamed 50 hours of content and featured streaming groups such as "HighRollers, Rivals of Waterdeep, Girls Guts Glory, MonarchsFactory, Nerd Poker, The Sirens, Drunks & Dragons, WebDM, D&D Beyond" and "performers such as Joe Manganiello, Taran Killam, Mica Burton, Jerry Holkins, Travis & Clint McElroy, Matthew Mercer, Anna Prosser, Jim Zub and Patrick Rothfuss".	
June 18–20, 2020	D&D Live 2020: Roll w/ Advantage	This event announced the Rime of the Frostmaiden storyline. Viewership of the event "reached over four million views". The event emphasized "a charity tie-in to Red Nose Day" and featured performers such as David Harbour, Brandon Routh, Karen Gillen, Amy Acker, Game Of Thrones cast members (Daniel Portman, Gemma Whelan, Iwan Rheon, Kristian Nairn and Natalia Tena), WWE wrestlers, and other celebrities and comedians.	
September 18–20, 2020	D&D Celebration 2020	An online event featuring panels and a ticketed online Adventurers League Epic game (a tie in to Icewind Dale: Rime of the Frostmaiden).	
July 16 & 17, 2021	D&D Live 2021 with G4	Wizards of the Coast partnered with G4 to present this event; it was streamed on both of their Twitch and YouTube channels and aired on Peacock. The event featured celebrities such as Patton Oswalt, Jack Black, Reggie Watts, and Lauren Lapkus.	
September 24–26, 2021	D&D Celebration 2021	An online event featuring panels (including previews of Strixhaven: Curriculum of Chaos and Fizban's Treasury of Dragons), celebrity D&D games, a D&D musical along with ticketed Feywild–themed virtual games.	
July 30–August 2, 2026	The D&D Tower: Gen Con 2026	Wizards of the Coast will host The D&D Tower at the Indiana Repertory Theatre during Gen Con 2026. This will include in-person and live-streamed events such as multiple performances of Dungeons & Dragons: The Twenty-Sided Tavern and speaking sessions by D&D community members, including Justice Arman, Mayanna Berrin, Anjali Bhimani, Jasmine Bhullar, Ginny Di, Luke Gygax, Laura Hickman, Tracy Hickman, Matthew Mercer, Christian Navarro, Neil Newbon, R. A. Salvatore, Wesley Schneider, Theo Solomon, Devora Wilde, James Wyatt, Jim Zub and others. Live games on the main stage or at the D&D Actual Play Amphitheater will include: Dungeon Masters Live Play with Bhullar as the Dungeon Master (DM); The Puppy Roll III: LIVE with Bhimani as the DM; Curse of Krystophus; Faster, Purple Worm: Defeat the Audience! with DM Jon Ciccolini; Upon the Edge of Hope with the Theatre of the Unaligned; Bones Of The Empire with DM Jason Carl; BlackwaterDnD presents... DM Roulette!; and StoryQuest Presents: Oops! ALL DM's!.	

== Other ==
Year	Title	Episodes	Description	Ref.
2017–2020	D&D News	121	Dungeons & Dragons communications manager Greg Tito presents recent news and announcements about the game.	
2017–present	Dragon Talk	321	Livestream of the Dragon Talk podcast where Dungeons & Dragons team members discuss the tabletop roleplaying game.	
2017–2020	Dragon+ Live	99	A talk show on the content in each issue of Dragon+ magazine hosted by Bart Carroll.	
2017–2018	Fireside Chats with Nathan Stewart	9	Nathan Stewart and others answer questions from social media.	
2017–2019	Idle Champions of the Forgotten Realms	92	Members of Codename Entertainment demo the video game Idle Champions of the Forgotten Realms.	
2018	Craft Hags (Season 2)	20	Host Dani Hartel explains various crafting techniques.	
2018	Mike Mearls Happy Fun Hour		Mike Mearls designs 5th edition gameplay material to make the design process more accessible.	
2018	Mordenkainen's Mayhem	7	In a knockout tournament, monsters from Mordenkainen's Tome of Foes are pitted against each other.	
2019–2020	D&D Communitea	16	A monthly talk show and tea party hosted by Celeste Conowitch, Hannah Rose, and Lysa Penrose.	
2019–2020	Dungeon Master's Guild Design Dash	12	A competition show that challenges DMs Guild's top-selling authors to design encounters, archetypes, and more in 15 minutes. Hosted by Lysa Penrose and Matt McElroy.	
2019–2020	Nolzur's Marvelous Tutorials with RealmSmith	35	Jason Azevedo's painting tutorial of the Nolzur's miniatures line. Presented by RealmSmith, WizKids, and Vallejo Paints.	
2019–2020	Welch's Game Juice	45	Game designer Kate Welch plays Dungeons & Dragons digital games.	
2020	Learning Dungeons & Dragons	8	Host Madeline Cullen explains how to play Dungeons & Dragons. Translated into French and German in 2021.	
2020	Learning Roll20	8	Carlos Luna and Victoria Rogers host a Roll20 tutorial show.	
2020	On Tour with Dragons	8	Jason Charles Miller visits game stores around the US while on tour.	
2023–2024	Heroes' Feast	20	A cooking competition and talk show hosted by Mike Haracz and Sujata Day; it is titled after the Dungeons & Dragons cookbook Heroes' Feast. It launched on the Dungeons & Dragons Adventures FAST channel in November 2023.	
