= Satine =

Satine may refer to:

- Satine Phoenix, Filipino American comic book illustrator, model, and actress
- Elena Satine, American actress
- Satine Kryze, a Star Wars character
- Satine, a character from the film Moulin Rouge!
- Satine, an organic milk brand by Yili Group
