= Sandeep Parikh =

American actor

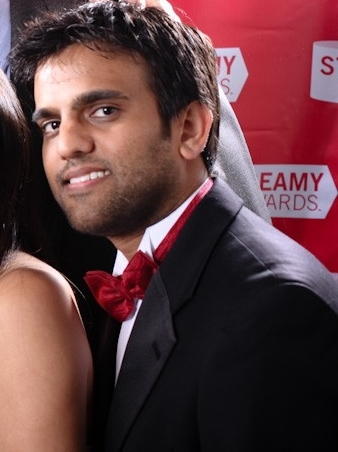
- Parikh at the 2009 Streamy Awards
- Born: July 23, 1980 (age 45); Goffstown, New Hampshire, U.S.
- Occupations: Writer, director, actor, producer
- Children: 1
- Awards: Webby

Sandeep Parikh (/pəˈriːk/; born July 23, 1980) is an American writer, director, actor and producer of comedy. He is best known for his co-starring role as Zaboo on the award-winning web series The Guild. He is the founder of Effin Funny Productions, a content company focusing on alternative stand-up comedy and the creation of original web series The Legend of Neil (for Comedy Central and AtomFilms), available online.

== Background ==
Parikh was born to Gujarati Indian immigrants in Goffstown, New Hampshire, and raised there by his parents, and with two older brothers, Rajiv and Sanjiv. He was a gymnast since the age of 4 and competed nationally in all six male events until 18.

Parikh went to Goffstown High School in New Hampshire and then went to Brown University where he received an A.B. in Computer Science with Honors in Creative Writing.

== Career ==
Parikh began improvising and writing sketches for the short-lived comedy troupe The Village Idiots at Brown University. In 2001, he wrote and produced his first film, The Courier Dodge, which was a finalist at the Ivy Film Festival for Best Comedy. He was awarded the Capstone at Brown for writing the feature screenplay Chess Wesley. After graduating, he lived in Brooklyn, New York, and wrote plays, one of which was produced at the Lower Tenement Theatre in Manhattan. He moved to Los Angeles in 2004 and wrote, directed, and produced an independent television pilot called The Good Guys. This landed him his agent at the William Morris Agency. In July 2006 he founded Effinfunny.com where he produced stand-up comedy shows in Los Angeles and edited the best bits into digestible clips for the Internet and created profiles for the comedians for promotional purposes. While in Los Angeles, he was roommates with Milana Vayntrub.

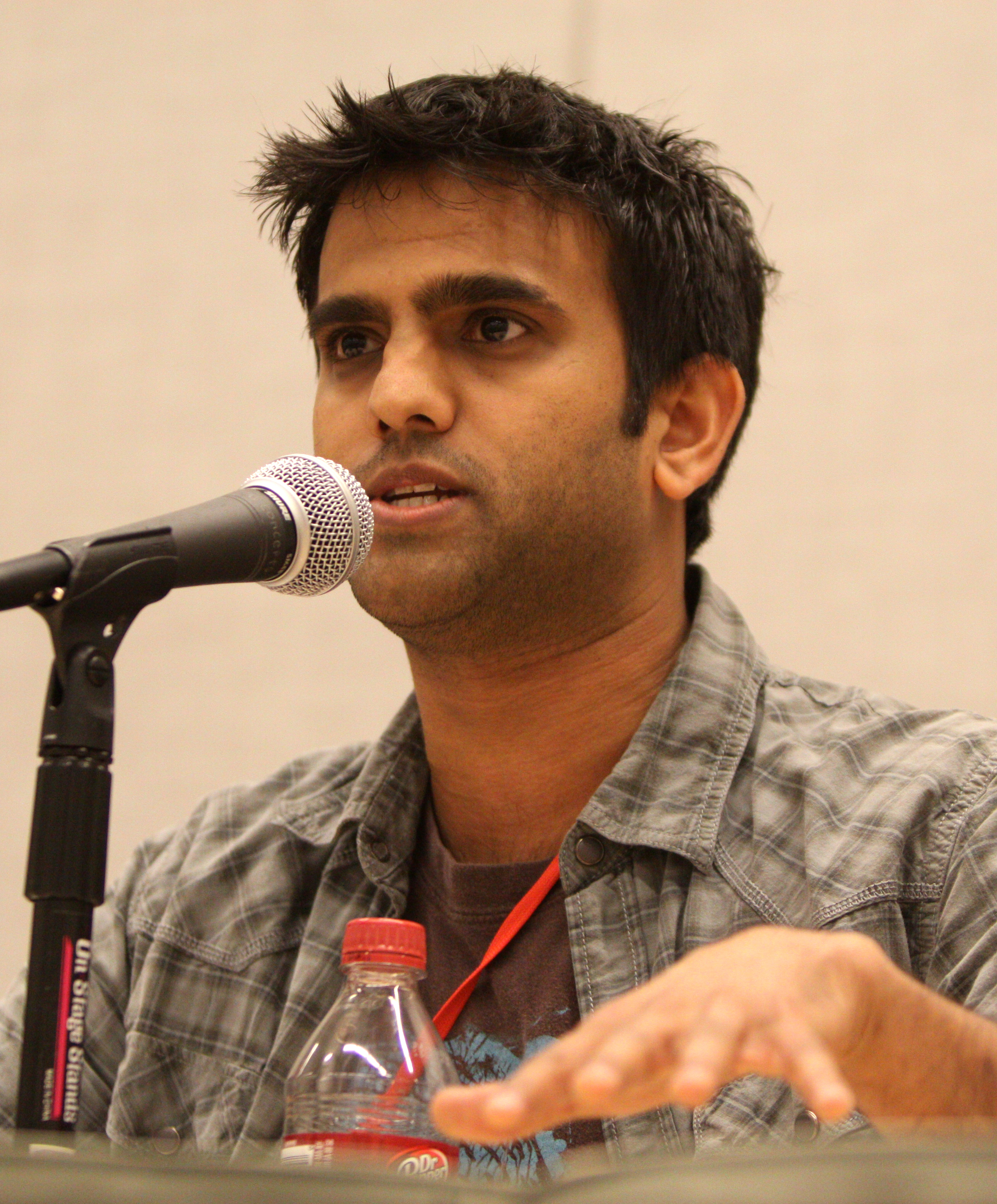
Parikh at the 2011 Phoenix Comicon for The Guild.

Parikh plays the role of "Zaboo" in The Guild, an Internet sitcom about a group of online role-playing game members whose guild meets in real life for the first time after Zaboo turns up on the doorstep of fellow gamer "Codex," played by show's star and creator Felicia Day, whom he has tracked down to give her the blue roses he crafted for her.

Parikh created, co-wrote, and directed The Legend of Neil about a real-world slacker who gets sucked into The Legend of Zelda and has to fight his way out with a wooden sword and no discernible skills. He wrote the four-minute short as a web pilot for VH1's Acceptable.tv. The show was cancelled before The Legend of Neil was eligible to air, but it won best Sci-Fi Fantasy Web Pilot for the Acceptable.tv podcast. The show was then a YouTube sensation, amassing over a quarter million hits. It was soon picked up by Comedy Central for five more webisodes that were released in July 2008 on Atom.com. A second season, commissioned by Comedy Central, was released by Atom.com in 2009. A third season followed, premiering in July 2010.

He also co-wrote, directed, and acted in Raptor, which had a two-episode run on Channel101.com, in which he portrays a man who plays foosball against his co-worker Raymond, a velociraptor. Parikh co-wrote, directed, and starred as Tom Selleck in The Blood Oath of Three Men and a Baby which likewise had a two-episode run on Channel101.

In 2009, Parikh appeared in an episode of Community. In the end credits scene of the season one episode "Debate 109," he appears as "Abed's Abed," playing Abed in one of his films and performing the Spanish rap from the end of "Spanish 101" with "Abed's Troy". After The Legend of Neil, Parikh created, starred and directed in Save the Supers for My Damn Channel in 2012. In 2013 and 2014, Parikh created two seasons of Code 5 with Ed Brubaker and Mel Cowan, the first season of which was licensed by TBS’s The Heckler. In 2014, Parikh guest starred in an episode of The Crazy Ones alongside Robin Williams and Sarah Michelle Gellar. He also executive produced and directed all six episodes of The Real Housewives of Horror for the Nerdist, which won an IAWTV award for Best Comedy Series.

In 2016, Parikh starred as a co-host in AWE me's web series Super Fan Builds. He also had his first writer’s room experience as the writer of two episodes Verizon Go90’s Miss 2059, created by and starring Anna Akana. In 2017, Parikh focused his creative pursuits in the field of a live action, choose your own adventure style series, combining his love of storytelling, video games, and programming. He created and directed an interactive sitcom that follows Milana Vayntrub as Jill, who desperately struggles to remember a forgotten friend’s name at a party (in episode one) and then has to deal with the embarrassment of getting dumped in public (in episode two). As each episode plays, the viewer has to help Jill out, selecting how she should answer particularly tough questions — and also, occasionally, playing other mini games.

In 2019, he served as the showrunning executive producer, and directed a majority of the episodes of another interactive series for Eko, called Wizard School Dropout. In 2020, he wrote on two an episodes of Glitch Techs, where he also and voices Haneesh and acts as a writing consultant on the first two seasons streaming on Netflix. Parikh produced and co-starred in the actual play web series DesiQuest alongside Anjali Bhimani, Omar Najam, Rekha Shankar, and Jasmine Bhullar.

== Personal life ==
Parikh resides in Los Angeles, California.
