= Rivals of Waterdeep =

Actual play web series and podcast

- Genre: Fantasy; Actual play
- Based on: Dungeons & Dragons 5th edition
- Starring: Aram Vartian; Carlos Luna; Tanya DePass; Cicero Holmes; Surena Marie; Brandon Stennis; Shareef Jackson; LaTia Jacquise; Masood Haque; Brian Gray; Eugenio Vargas
- Country of origin: United States
- Original language: English
- No. of seasons: 13
- No. of episodes: 141

Production
- Producer: Wizards of the Coast (2018-20)
- Production locations: Chicago, Illinois
- Running time: Approximately 120 minutes per episode

Original release
- Network: Twitch; YouTube
- Release: June 2, 2018 – present

Rivals of Waterdeep is an American actual play web series, with a podcast adaptation, where the cast plays Dungeons & Dragons using the fifth edition ruleset. It is set in the Forgotten Realms campaign setting and the show's Dungeon Master changes each season. The show premiered in June 2018; the show's thirteenth season ended in August 2022. It is one of the longest running official Dungeons & Dragons web series.

== Cast ==
- Aram Vartian as season one's Dungeon Master
- Carlos Luna as Noc Noc, a half-orc fighter, and as season one and two's Dungeon Master
- Tanya DePass as Selise Astorio, a human paladin, and as season eight's Dungeon Master
- Cicero Holmes as Perrin Underbough, a halfling bard, and as season five's Dungeon Master
- Surena Marie as Ashbourne, a half-elf ranger, and as season four's Dungeon Master
- Brandon Stennis as Rinn Leodin, an elven sorcerer
- Shareef Jackson as Shaka, a tiefling warlock, and as season three, six, and seven's Dungeon Master
- LaTia Jacquise as D'Hani Lai, an Aarakocra monk, and as season nine and twelve's Dungeon Master
- Masood Haque as Gazrick Nomrad, a gnome druid, and as season ten's Dungeon Master
- Brian Gray as Virgil, an Aasimar sorcerer, and as season eleven's co-Dungeon Master
- Eugenio Vargas as Kent, a tiefling rogue, and as season eleven's co-Dungeon Master

== Premise ==
The show features a party of adventurers in the Forgotten Realms campaign setting with a rotating Dungeon Master. Rivals of Waterdeep initially adapted the Waterdeep: Dragon Heist adventure module. It has since adapted other official Dungeons & Dragons storylines such as Baldur's Gate: Descent Into Avernus.

== Production ==
=== Development ===
Greg Tito, a senior communications manager for Dungeons & Dragons, wanted to develop actual play shows after watching the success of the independent web series The Adventure Zone (launched in 2014) and Critical Role (launched in 2015) which led Wizards of the Coast (Wizards) to develop and launch Dice, Camera, Action in 2016. Tito said that show was "insanely popular" and "the success of that allowed us to create relationships with smaller tabletop roleplayers that were in front of an audience. The entire ecosystem began to grow from there". This led to the development of Rivals of Waterdeep.

=== Casting ===
The Rivals of Waterdeep cast is made of a diverse group of performers based in Chicago. Tito initially recruited Tanya DePass for the show. Tito said he reached out to DePass because she was "a strong voice in the community and was in the Chicago area" and recruited "another group of roleplayers who just put their toe into doing D&D related content, but were mostly known as improv actors and comedians". Aram Vartian was season one's Dungeon Master with Carlos Luna, DePass, Cicero Holmes, Surena Marie, Brandon Stennis and Shareef Jackson as players.

Luna replaced Vartian as the Dungeon Master of season one after Vartian left the show mid-season; the Dungeon Master for Rivals of Waterdeep now rotates between various cast members. In 2020, Surena Marie and Luna left the show during the sixth season when they relocated to Los Angeles after Marie joined Critical Role Productions. LaTia Jacquise initially joined Rivals of Waterdeep as a guest in the sixth season at the 2020 C2E2 live show before becoming a permanent member. Cicero Holmes left the show at the end of the sixth season. Masood Haque joined as a guest for some Rivals of Waterdeep specials before becoming a regular cast member in the seventh season premiere. Brandon Stennis left the show at the end of the eighth season in 2020. In 2021, Brian Gray and Eugenio Vargas joined the cast in the ninth season premiere.

=== Filming ===
Rivals of Waterdeep premiered in June 2018 with an episode at the Stream of Many Eyes event before launching as a fully produced show by Wizards later that month. During the COVID-19 pandemic, the show introduced social distancing measures. The show streamed from the 2020 D&D Celebration event. In July 2021, the show released its one hundredth episode. The show's fourteenth season premiered on October 16, 2022.

In 2022, Vargas commented that "the rotating DM model has really shown that you can tell coherent stories with consistent character through lines and keep the tone and style fresh by rotating your narrator. A table of all BIPOC players that has told stories for as long as the Rivals have is also a huge accomplishment, putting the lie to any statements of ‘there aren't BIPOC roleplayers out there for my show!' And, if we're able to conclude the Rivals tale like we want, we'll also be one of the few AP shows to make it to 20th level and show what adventuring at that level can look like".

=== Cancellation and future ===
In 2021, Rivals of Waterdeep became independently produced and was listed as an official partner show of the Dungeons & Dragons brand.

During the finale of Season 13 in August 2022, the cast revealed that Wizards of the Coast was ending its financial sponsorship of Rivals of Waterdeep; the show would become fully independent of Wizards of the Coast at the midway point of the upcoming Season 14. On October 12, 2022, Rivals of Waterdeep launched an IndieGoGo to crowdfund $60,000 to produce the final 2 1/2 seasons. Christian Hoffer, for ComicBook.com, commented that "Rivals previously launched a Patreon to help supplement funding and support for the show, but their IndieGoGo page notes that it hasn't raised the funds necessary to keep the show's production levels at their current standards" and that "Wizards has increasingly de-emphasized community-created shows on their Twitch and YouTube channels". The crowdfunding campaign ended with a total of $23,291 raised.

== Episodes ==
=== Series overview ===
Season	Episodes	Originally released	
Season	Episodes	First released	Last released
1	10	June 2, 2018	August 27, 2018
2	10	September 24, 2018	December 17, 2018
3	10	January 21, 2019	April 5, 2019
4	10	June 11, 2019	August 26, 2019
5	10	September 23, 2019	January 3, 2020
6	10	January 20, 2020	April 20, 2020
7	10	June 22, 2020	August 29, 2020
8	10	October 12, 2020	December 27, 2020
9	10	January 31, 2021	April 16, 2021
10	10	May 17, 2021	July 25, 2021
11	10	October 23, 2021	December 10, 2021
12	10	February 6, 2022	April 18, 2022
13	10	June 1, 2022	August 18, 2022
14	1	October 16, 2022	TBA
S	11	May 18, 2019	May 24, 2021

=== Season 1 (2018) ===
No. overall	No. in season	Title	Original release date
1	1	"The Price of a Soul"	June 18, 2018
2	2	"Into the City"	June 25, 2018
3	3	"A Hunter's Revenge"	July 2, 2018
4	4	"Stream of Many Eyes"	June 2, 2018
Note: Episode premiered before the launch of the show at the Stream of Many Eyes event; however, it is considered the show's fourth episode.
5	5	"Talent is the Ticket"	July 16, 2018
6	6	"Don't Trust Kids"	July 30, 2018
7	7	"A Performance of a Lifetime"	August 6, 2018
Note: Last appearance of Aram Vartian
8	8	"Rope"	August 13, 2018
Note: Carlos Luna becomes the Dungeon Master
9	9	"A Race Against Time"	August 20, 2018
10	10	"Black Magic"	August 27, 2018

=== Season 2 (2018) ===
No. overall	No. in season	Title	Original release date
11	1	"3 Months Later"	September 24, 2018
Note: Carlos Luna continues as the Dungeon Master
12	2	"The Machine"	October 1, 2018
13	3	"The Rat in the Alley"	October 8, 2018
14	4	"Purpose"	October 15, 2018
15	5	"The Falling Leaf"	October 28, 2018
16	6	"Portraits"	November 5, 2018
17	7	"Dreams"	November 12, 2018
18	8	"Malevolent"	November 19, 2018
19	9	"Kaleidoscope"	December 10, 2018
20	10	"Season Finale"	December 17, 2018

=== Season 3 (2019) ===
No. overall	No. in season	Title	Original release date
21	1	"After"	January 21, 2019
Note: Shareef Jackson becomes the Dungeon Master
22	2	"Keys"	January 28, 2019
23	3	"Reader"	February 4, 2019
24	4	"North"	February 11, 2019
25	5	"Mirrors"	February 18, 2019
26	6	"Catacombs"	February 25, 2019
27	7	"Training"	March 4, 2019
28	8	"Hideout"	March 11, 2019
29	9	"Planning"	March 18, 2019
30	10	"Season Finale Live from PAX East"	April 5, 2019
Note: Live show was broadcast from PAX East 2019.

=== Season 4 (2019) ===
No. overall	No. in season	Title	Original release date
31	1	"The Trollskull Manor"	June 11, 2019
Note: Surena Marie becomes the Dungeon Master
32	2	"Home Sweet Haunt"	June 17, 2019
33	3	"Woman in the Mirror"	June 24, 2019
34	4	"Answer the Call"	July 1, 2019
35	5	"The Tavern"	July 8, 2019
36	6	"A Blast from the Past"	July 15, 2019
37	7	"Fated"	July 25, 2019
38	8	"The Guardian"	August 13, 2019
39	9	"Futureproof"	August 20, 2019
40	10	"Golden & Green"	August 26, 2019

=== Season 5 (2019–20) ===
No. overall	No. in season	Title	Original release date
41	1	"The Style You Haven't Done Yet"	September 23, 2019
Note: Cicero Holmes becomes the Dungeon Master
42	2	"You Must Learn"	September 30, 2019
43	3	"Breath Control"	October 7, 2019
44	4	"Hip Hop Rules"	October 14, 2019
45	5	"Who Protects Us from You?"	October 21, 2019
46	6	"Bo! Bo! Bo!"	October 28, 2019
47	7	"Gimme, Dat, (Woy!)"	November 11, 2019
48	8	"World Peace"	November 25, 2019
49	9	"Why is That?"	December 9, 2019
50	10	"Jah Rulez"	January 3, 2020

=== Season 6 (2020) ===
No. overall	No. in season	Title	Original release date
51	1	"Season Six Premiere"	January 20, 2020
Note: Shareef Jackson becomes the Dungeon Master
52	2	"Whose House?"	January 27, 2020
53	3	"Snail's Pace"	February 3, 2020
54	4	"From the Windows"	February 10, 2020
Note: Last episode for Carlos Luna and Surena Marie as cast members
55	5	"To the Wall"	February 17, 2020
56	6	"Darkness"	February 24, 2020
57	7	"Games (Live from C2E2!)"	March 1, 2020
Note: LaTia Jacquise joins the cast; Surena Marie guest stars. Live show was broadcast from C2E2
58	8	"Afterparty"	March 16, 2020
59	9	"Trenchcoat Slimer"	April 13, 2020
60	10	"Fart"	April 20, 2020
Note: Last episode for Cicero Holmes as cast member

=== Season 7 (2020) ===
No. overall	No. in season	Title	Original release date
61	1	"Bills, Bills, Bills"	June 22, 2020
Note: Shareef Jackson continues as the Dungeon Master; Masood Haque joins the cast
62	2	"Talent Show"	June 29, 2020
63	3	"Again"	July 6, 2020
64	4	"Frenemies"	July 13, 2020
65	5	"Into the Dark"	July 20, 2020
66	6	"Strictly Business"	August 3, 2020
67	7	"Unfinished Business"	August 16, 2020
68	8	"Business As Usual"	August 16, 2020
69	9	"Business Never Personal"	August 29, 2020
70	10	"Back In Business"	August 29, 2020

=== Season 8 (2020) ===
No. overall	No. in season	Title	Original release date
71	1	"Past & Present Tense"	October 12, 2020
Note: Tanya DePass becomes the Dungeon Master
72	2	"A Cold Welcome Back"	October 21, 2020
73	3	"Stone Hearts"	November 8, 2020
74	4	"The Past is Always Lurking"	November 8, 2020
75	5	"Old Debts"	November 16, 2020
76	6	"Cold Hearts, Frozen Follies"	December 1, 2020
77	7	"Monologues, Fights & Follies"	December 6, 2020
78	8	"It Could Be Worse?"	December 14, 2020
79	9	"Tick Tock Rivals, Tick Tock"	December 20, 2020
80	10	"Silver Tongues and Falling Rocks"	December 27, 2020
Note: Last episode for Brandon Stennis as cast member

=== Specials ===
==== One-shots ====
No.	Title	Original release date
1	"Descent Into Avernus"	May 18, 2019
Note: Erika Ishii guest stars. Broadcast live from D&D Live 2019
2	"Infernal Goose"	May 18, 2020
Note: Masood Haque guest stars
3	"Undermountain the Musical!"	June 18, 2020
Note: Masood Haque guest stars
4	"D&D Celebration – Rivals of Waterdeep"	September 18, 2020
Note: Tanya DePass acts as Dungeon Master for cast members Masood Haque and Shareef Jackson along with guest stars C'Loni Bailey, Krystina Arielle, Omega Jones and TK Johnson. Broadcast live from D&D Celebration 2020
5	"Boldly Go!"	October 24, 2020
Note: Tanya DePass acts as game master for cast members Shareef Jackson, LaTia Jacquise, Masood Haque along with guest star Brian Gray; Star Trek themed one-shot for Roll20Con 2020
6	"Asians Represent & Rivals of Waterdeep D&D Charity Game – Part 1"	May 24, 2021
Note: Daniel Kwan acts as guest Dungeon Master for cast members Tanya DePass and Shareef Jackson along with guest stars Steven Hunyh and Agatha Chang; part of a Gen Con charity event
7	"Asians Represent & Rivals of Waterdeep D&D Charity Game – Part 2"	May 24, 2021
8	"The Rivals"	January 3, 2024
Note: Reunion special for Idle Champions.

==== Kids on Bikes ====
No.	Title	Original release date
1	"Learning to play Kids on Bikes (Session 0)"	September 6, 2020
Note: Masood Haque is the game master of this limited series sponsored by Blue Microphones which uses the Kids on Bikes role-playing game system
2	"Kids on Bikes Session 1"	September 19, 2020
3	"Kids on Bikes Session 2"	September 21, 2020
4	"Kids on Bikes Session 3"	September 28, 2020

== Reception ==
The Guardian, The New York Times, VentureBeat, and Polygon all highlighted that Rivals of Waterdeep is part of the trend of actual play shows re-popularizing Dungeons & Dragons and that the show is notable for a cast "made up predominantly of women and people of color". G.L. van Os, in an essay in the book Watch Us Roll (2021), wrote that "voices from minorities will have to be sought out and lifted up, in order to create a more diverse playing field within actual play. Fortunately, there are several diverse actual play shows out there already, such as Rivals of Waterdeep and Dames and Dragons, they just have not received as much attention as Critical Role and The Adventure Zone yet". Amanda Farough, for VentureBeat, also highlighted that "Wizards of the Coast has been able to put a finer point on the impact of actual play shows on its brand awareness and sales. While the company wasn't willing to share its impression numbers, in 2019, live show viewership increased 49%. Of its total views, 15% are during live broadcasts (mostly represented by Twitch), with the remainder coming from video on demand on YouTube".

By 2020, Rivals of Waterdeep was only the show that premiered at the 2018 Stream of Many Eyes event to still be on the air. Christian Hoffer, for ComicBook.com, called Rivals of Waterdeep the flagship show for the Dungeons & Dragons brand in 2020. Hoffer, in a separate article for ComicBook.com in 2021, wrote that "the longevity to Rivals of Waterdeep is impressive, not only because the show's characters are on the cusp of reaching the fabled 'Tier 4' levels that most D&D campaigns never reach, but also because of what the show means to the wider D&D community. Notably, Rivals of Waterdeep's cast are all people of color, offering important representation to a group typically underserviced in both the D&D streaming space and the wider tabletop roleplaying game community". Hoffer highlighted the show's innovation of Dungeon Master rotation which gives each season "a distinct flavor". He also highlighted that while the show "incorporates elements" of the official storylines, it makes these storylines its own.

Rivals of Waterdeep was included in Syfy Wire's "12 High Fantasy Podcasts That'll Take You on an Adventure During Your Commute" 2019 roundup and in Screen Rant's "D&D: The Best Livestreams & Podcast Campaigns Still Going In 2022" roundup.

== See also ==
- List of Dungeons & Dragons web series
- List of fantasy podcasts
