= DesiQuest =

- Genre: Fantasy; Actual play
- Created by: Jasmine Bhullar
- Inspired by: Dungeons & Dragons
- Directed by: Michael Schaubach
- Starring: Anjali Bhimani; Omar Najam; Sandeep Parikh; Rekha Shankar; Jasmine Bhullar
- No. of seasons: 1
- No. of episodes: 8

Production
- Running time: c. 110–140 minutes
- Production company: EffinFunny

Original release
- Network: YouTube
- Release: November 14, 2023 – March 26, 2024

DesiQuest is an actual play web series created by American actual play actress, writer, and streamer Jasmine Bhullar. Inspired by Dungeons & Dragons, the series features South Asian players and the story, written by Bhullar, is based on South Asian mythology and culture. The series debuted in November 2023 on the EffinFunny YouTube channel.

== Premise ==
The game is set in the fictional world of Vehaar. The campaign's cast, mythology, and cultural touchstones are South Asian.

== Cast and characters ==
- Anjali Bhimani as Sitara the Druid, a Vollywood film star
- Omar Najam as Murkha the Artificer, a talented inventor
- Sandeep Parikh as Ashwathama “Ash” Aswinikuma the Cleric
- Rekha Shankar as Laddoo Auntie the Barbarian, a sweet and strict auntie
- Jasmine Bhullar as the Game Master

== Production ==
Jasmine Bhullar conceptualized the idea for DesiQuest after a conversation with Janina Gavankar about how she had never done an actual play with another Desi person. Bhullar is an Indian American Punjabi Sikh. She is an established gamemaster (GM) and player of tabletop role-playing games (TTRPG), best known for GM'ing the actual play web series Dimension 20: Coffin Run (2022) and D&D Beyond's Battle 4 Beyond (2021) as well as appearing as a player in Geek & Sundry's Relics and Rarities (2019) and in Critical Role one-shots. With DesiQuest Bhullar stated, "I hope that it brings...better historical context of South Asia that's kind of missing from the scene right now -- different South Asian armor styles, combat styles, weapons, and even mythological touchstones." Bhullar created the world of Vehaar, and the gameplay is inspired by Dungeons & Dragons with some homebrew elements.

The show was co-developed by Sandeep Parikh, who plays Ash in the show. Parikh produced DesiQuest through his company EffinFunny. The two pitched the idea to external platforms but ultimately decided to fundraise on Kickstarter in order to maintain control over the project's content, ownership, and distribution. In 2022, they launched a Kickstarter campaign to raise money to develop the show with a cast, mythology, and cultural touchstones from South Asia. The campaign ultimately met the fundraising goal of $150,000.

In June 2026, Bhullar announced her departure from the series.

== Release ==
The first four episodes were released in November 2023 on EffinFunny's YouTube channel. The second half of season one was released in January 2024.

== Critical reception ==
DesiQuest received positive reception. Glen Weldon of NPR praised the cast's performers for "bringing deeply shared cultural references to their gameplay with such passion and humor." Em Friedman of Polygon complimented the show's cast, pacing, and "thoughtful world-building."
