= The Legend of Neil =

- Genre: Comedy
- Created by: Sandeep Parikh
- Written by: Sandeep Parikh; Tony Janning
- Directed by: Sandeep Parikh
- Starring: Tony Janning; Mike Rose; Felicia Day; Angie Hill; Eric Acosta; Scott Chernoff
- Country of origin: United States
- Original language: English
- No. of seasons: 3
- No. of episodes: 20

Production
- Executive producer: Sandeep Parikh

Original release
- Release: May 6, 2007 – October 27, 2010

The Legend of Neil is a comedy web series distributed by Comedy Central's partner Atom.com and is a parody of the Nintendo game The Legend of Zelda. Sandeep Parikh of The Guild fame directs the series. Tony Janning writes for the series, and acts as the title character Neil. Felicia Day and Mike Rose, who have worked with Parikh on the set of The Guild, appear as recurring characters.

The series follows Neil, who is sucked into the world of The Legend of Zelda while playing the game. As he travels Hyrule he is mistaken for the hero of the game, Link. The series is "full of self degrading, foul humor", such as when Neil is sucked into the game he is masturbating over, and strangles himself with his NES controller.

The series began as a four-minute YouTube video posted in 2007. The video went viral, receiving several million views. Its popularity led to Atom.com financing a web series based around the video.

The first season was released in 2008. According to Fox Business before the premiere of the second season, "With nearly one million plays, the hit Web series by creator Sandeep Parikh built one of the Web's most enthusiastic fan bases in 2008." In the run-up to the August 2009 premiere of the second season, MTV2 planned to air the complete first season. The series was also nominated for multiple Streamys at the 1st Streamy Awards in 2009.

Season 3 began on July 25, 2010. Each episode of season 3 features a remix of the original theme song performed by a different musical guest.

A DVD was released on December 4, 2012.

On January 7, 2019, The YouTube channel EffinFunny began re-releasing the Episodes, starting with the first two. As of January 31, 2019, the whole series, gag reels, and minisodes are available on the EffinFunny YouTube channel.

== Characters and cast ==
- Neil (Link) – after getting fired from a gas station by his brother, a drunken Neil was transported into the Nintendo game The Legend of Zelda. He then unwillingly plays the role of the game's main character, a forest elf named Link. Neil as Link contrasts with many of the characters' views of Link; while Link is honest and brave, Neil is lazy and will use any tricks he can find to get out of the game. He is so much the opposite of Link that he tends to befriend the monsters whose sole purpose is to kill him. Neil is portrayed by co-writer of the series, Tony Janning.
- Old Man – Link's in-game mentor, loosely based on the old man in the first Zelda video game who gives the player a wooden sword before the first level. Old Man is portrayed by Mike Rose. Old Man has a twin brother O-old Man (pronounced with a change in emphasis) who is left-handed, a better potion maker, and has Tourette syndrome. Usually only one of the twins speaks to Link, but on occasion—such as in Season 2, Episode 3—they appear simultaneously. Both of the Old Men are generally helpful to Neil, often in a sarcastic or condescending manner.
- Fairy – a fairy who replenishes Link's health. In the series she does so by having sex with Link, and she becomes emotionally and sexually obsessed with him. Fairy also seems to be emotionally unstable, often taking Neil's compliments as insults and vice versa. In the series, the fairies are hunted for their dust, which is used as a drug, a fate which befalls Fairy in Season 2, Episode 1. In the first episode of the third season it is revealed that the fairy is pregnant. Fairy is portrayed by Felicia Day of Dr. Horrible and The Guild fame.
- Princess Zelda – the title character from the video game. Zelda's parents were killed by Ganon and she herself was captured and imprisoned. She appears to Neil in visions, alternately pleading and enticing him to continue to rescue her. Neil was initially surprised by her ethnic appearance, expecting a lighter-skinned princess from the video game graphics (In "The Legend of Neil" she's black). Zelda is portrayed by Angie Hill. Dr. Horrible co-creator Maurissa Tancharoen Whedon provides Zelda's singing voice in the musical episode.
- Ganon – the leading antagonist of the game and series. Ganon is played as an incompetent authority figure, impervious to the suggestions of his advisor Wizzrobe. Ganon never seems to leave his shadowed throne until the end of season two. He seems to enjoy singing and is a patron of stand-up comedy. Ganon's ineptitude extends to his attempts to woo Princess Zelda at a "romantic" dinner. In the Season 2 finale he reveals to Zelda that his parents are trapped in some "vortex". It is implied that Ganon is a Moblin. When his face is finally shown, there are similarities, and he comments that he possesses three penises, a trait previously attributed to the Moblins. Ganon is portrayed by Scott Chernoff.
- Wizzrobe – Ganon's sidekick. He first appears after Neil has met Fairy and steals Neil's clothing to lure him to the Level 1 dungeon. He frequently observes logical inconsistencies within the game that are recognizable to fans, such as the maps and keys that are left in the dungeon for Link to find. Whenever he suggests changing the policy to Ganon, he is abused for his presumption, forcing him into the role of a fawning toady. Wizzrobe applies Ganon's makeup before his 'big date' with the captive Princess Zelda, prompting Ganon to insinuate that Wizzrobe is infatuated with him, prompting unconvincing denial. Wizzrobe is actually gay and is seen in the finale smooching with the Male Fairy. Wizzrobe is portrayed by Eric Acosta.
- Dark Nut – A powerful dark knight (nonsensically renamed by Ganon to conform to The Legend of Zelda terminology) introduced by Wizzrobe as an invincible opponent to Neil. The other Dark Nuts are seemingly unfazed by Neil's sword blasts, and the Dark Nut was able to knock him unconscious with a single blow. But in the second episode of the third season it is revealed that, due to budget cuts, the Dark Nuts' armor doesn't cover their butts. This is their only weakness and eventually they are killed by Neil. Darknut has a brother who appears in "The Gloffice" and is seen crying over his dead brothers as Wizzrobe comforts him. In the finale, this Dark Nut is (like Wizzrobe) gay and is seen making out with a Stalfos. Dark Nut is portrayed by Jeff Winkler.
- Octorok – In Season 1, Neil is often plagued by the Octorok creatures. In the show they are depicted as thin men wearing loin cloths and red masks. They announce their presence with an odd ululation, and throw rocks at Neil. They occasionally speak to Neil, usually to threaten him in their scary voice, try to trick him in their squeaky voice, or to plead in their normal voice when one of them is killed by Neil, but generally stick to the ululation. In Season 2 "A Link to the Past" he kills three of them. In "Gettin' High in Hyrule", one of them is used as a dartboard and feels no pain. And in "The Gloffice", one of them works there.
- Moblin – Moblins are strong creatures with three penises who seem to want nothing but to destroy and sodomize Link. The most notable Moblins are Blight of Ganon's "The Gloffice" and the secret moblin, Pippi who helps Link even against his "primal" urges. Moblins are depicted as humanoid because of the low budget of the series. The Moblins (except Pippi) attack Neil but with some help from the bow, sex with Fairy and sword beams, he kills them all.
- Stalfos – Three Stalfos made only two appearances—in "The Skeletons in Link's Closet" and "Restart of the King". They are portrayed as gay skeletons with German accents that mock Neil into killing them. They tease Neil by insulting him and making up some stupid deals causing him to stab two of them and laser the last one. The first one has a key in its ribs and a bandana, the second one has a belt, and the third one has a mustache. One of them is seen in the finale, making out with a Dark Nut.
- Keese – Keeses appear in "The Skeletons in Link's Closet", "A Date with Destiny" and "The Gloffice". They look like models on strings because of the low budget of the series. After Neil puts on the Hero's Clothes, a bat takes a dump on him and they attack him by swarming around him like bees. After Neil escapes and kills the Stalfos, the Keeses attack him again. In Season 1 "Map Questing", the Keeses are revealed by Wizzrobe telling Ganon that Neil has killed all the Keeses. Neil kills them in Season 2 in "A Date with Destiny" and one Keese appears in "The Gloffice" talking to Ganon in the introduction.
- Goriya – Three Goriyas make their one appearance in Season 1 in "Map Questing". They are portrayed as goblins with Australian accents, carrying boomerangs. They say to Neil that they're powerful and they've got boomerangs. Neil zaps the three Goriyas with his sword beams. One Goriya appears in a picture in Season 2 "Gettin' High in Hyrule" that says, "Missing. Last seen playing with boomerangs."
- Gibdo – Gibdos appear in three episodes: "Les Neilérables", in which Neil sings after killing them; "A Date with Destiny", in which Neil kills them while they make out and give birth to a baby Gibdo, which Neil kicks away; and "The Gloffice", in which one of them works there.

== Plot ==
=== Season 1 (2007, 2008) ===
Title	Writer(s)	Director	Original airdate	#
"The Beginning"	Tony Janning and Sandeep Parikh	Sandeep Parikh	YouTube release: May 6, 2007; Atom.com relaunch: July 24, 2008	1
Neil (Tony Janning) wakes up hung over and naked in a forest. A giggling fairy flies over him and drops elf clothing on him. After getting dressed and obtaining a tiny shield, he enters a cave, where he finds an old man named 'Old Man'. Old Man tells him he is Link, who is on a quest to defeat Lord Gannon and save all of Hyrule, and gives him a wooden sword. Neil leaves the cave and gets stuck in a looped map.
"First Blood"	Tony Janning and Sandeep Parikh	Sandeep Parikh	July 31, 2008	2
Neil is attacked by a ululating monster that is throwing a rock. Neil kills the creature, whose corpse disappears, leaving a cookie in the shape of a heart. Prodded by Old Man, he reluctantly eats the heart cookie, which refills his heart meter on his arm and allows his sword to shoot lasers. He is then surrounded and attacked by a group of Octoroks.
"The Fairy's Obsession"	Tony Janning and Sandeep Parikh	Sandeep Parikh	August 7, 2008	3
Neil, badly beaten by the group of Octoroks, has a vision of Princess Zelda (who is black, which surprises Neil), then falls beside a fairy pond. Fairy comes out and begins to heal Neil, but then starts getting neurotic and fickle. She forces Neil to tell her he loves her, then she mends his wounds with sex. A cloaked figure, one of Gannon's minions, steals Link's clothing and throws it into a cave marked "Level 1".
"The Skeletons in Link's Closet"	Tony Janning and Sandeep Parikh	Sandeep Parikh	August 14, 2008	4
Wizrobe suggests that it would be easier to kill Link if they dropped him into a harder level than Level 1. Gannon smacks him for his insolence. Neil is attacked by bats and skeletons with German accents. After collecting a key from the skeletons, he uses it to open a door and is attacked by more bats.
"Map Questing"	Tony Janning and Sandeep Parikh	Sandeep Parikh	August 21, 2008	5
Gannon is shocked by Link's progression in level 1. Neil discovers a map of Level 1 and a bow. He defeats goblins with Australian accents and collects a boomerang. Wizrobe questions why Gannon left such useful items for their opponent, and Gannon explains that the purpose is to help his minions if they get lost. Neil runs into Old Man, and is shown that there is a hidden room on the map; Neil had not noticed that the map was incompletely unfolded. He leaves as Old Man warns him of the boss of level 1, a dragon with a unicorn horn.
"Who's the Boss"	Tony Janning and Sandeep Parikh	Sandeep Parikh	September 4, 2008	6
Neil is knocked out by the dragon and dreams of being in bed with Zelda (and Gannon). After he recovers consciousness, Neil finds the one part of the room that the dragon can't get to, and the dragon complains that it's not fair. The dragon and Neil commiserate and become friends, and the boss begs for Neil to kill him. Neil collects the first Triforce of nine.

=== Season 2 (2009) ===
Title	Writer(s)	Director	Original airdate	Ssn #	Srs #
"A Link to the Past"	Tony Janning and Sandeep Parikh	Sandeep Parikh	July 28, 2009	1	7
The episode begins with a flashback to Neil's failing real life a week earlier. After the flashback, Neil awakes next to the sleeping fairy. He gets up and is attacked by Octoroks. After vanquishing them, he is attacked by a blue troll, who injures him with an arrow. As he flees, Old Man appears to him with a clue about how to get a candle and a bigger shield. Link escapes into a store and the Moblin captures Fairy in a jar.
"Death in Store"	Tony Janning and Sandeep Parikh	Sandeep Parikh	August 10, 2009	2	8
Neil meets the merchant, who quotes prices far beyond Neil's means. When Neil persists, the Merchant lets Neil into the back room, where he can play Money Making Game. Neil quickly loses, and is about to have his eyes confiscated when the Elf Cop breaks in to raid the illegal gambling den. The Elf Cop allows Neil to take the goods he couldn't buy, assuming "Link" to be above stealing.
"Les Neilérables"	Tony Janning and Sandeep Parikh	Sandeep Parikh	August 24, 2009	3	9
The episode opens with the Moblin examining his collection of fairies, including Fairy and a Male Fairy. The Male Fairy tries to cheer up Fairy with a happy song, and Fairy joins in with singing about her love of raunchy, abusive sex, nauseating the Male Fairy. Meanwhile, Neil fights an orange triceratops and collects the second Triforce. Gannon and Wizrobe are astonished at Neil's accomplishment, but are sure that the next level will destroy him. Neil meets the Old Men, who make fun of him and give him a potion. Zelda, imprisoned, sings of her faith in Neil, while Neil, defeating mummies, tries to get drunk on potion and wishes he were home. Neil defeats a four-headed plant that is shipped to Gannon, stimulating further consternation in his council. After a grand finale, Wizrobe whispers a new plan to Gannon and Neil discovers a Pub.
"Gettin' High in Hyrule"	Tony Janning and Sandeep Parikh	Sandeep Parikh	September 7, 2009	4	10
Neil, disregarding Old Man's warnings, sneaks into the Pub. He finds a bulletin board with wanted posters for Link, the mass murderer of Hyrule. Disguising himself with a Moblin helmet, he joins the Moblins in the Pub, whose main conversational topic is ways of torturing and killing Link. After a long drunken carouse, Neil's helmet falls off and he is recognized as Link. He pleads with the Moblins, who are the only friends he has found in Hyrule, but they still want to kill him. Neil runs away and is captured by the Secret Moblin, who misdirects the pursuers.
"The Secret Moblin"	Tony Janning and Sandeep Parikh	Sandeep Parikh	September 21, 2009	5	11
Neil wakes up in the cave of the Secret Moblin named Pippi, who has fully replenished Neil's heart meter. The Secret Moblin describes his elfin studies, and his need to suppress his base instincts of sodomizing and killing elves. He teaches Neil how to use his "inventory" by holding his items above his head, and he tells Neil of a magic whistle in Level 5 that can send Neil anywhere he wishes. The Secret Moblin begins to lose control of his base instincts and Neil leaves the cave as the Secret Moblin attempts to suppress three simultaneous erections. Neil travels through the desert to find the waterfall that hides the White Sword. However, upon spying the waterfall, he is shot by an arrow in the left arm by the Moblins from the pub.
"The Fairy Strikes Back"	Tony Janning and Sandeep Parikh	Sandeep Parikh	October 5, 2009	6	12
After many tries, Neil pulls his bow and arrows from his inventory and kills the Moblin holding Fairy who has sex with Neil to replenish his heart meter. Neil then dispatches the other Moblins before entering the cave behind the waterfall and attaining the White Sword (the same wooden sword that is painted white) from Old Man. Meanwhile, Wizrobe introduces Gannon to a powerful, armoured monster.
"A Date with Destiny"	Tony Janning and Sandeep Parikh	Sandeep Parikh	October 19, 2009	7	13
Neil fights his way through the enemies in Level 5 on his way to attain the Magic Whistle. On his way to grab the whistle, three Dark Nuts ambushes Neil, who tries to laser them with his sword beams. Unfortunately, the Dark Nuts are unfazed by them. While Neil is distracted, the Dark Nut appears and knocks him unconscious. Gannon tries his best to court Princess Zelda who says Link will come to save her. Gannon reveals Neil tied up and beaten by Dark Nut. Neil reveals that he does not love Princess Zelda and would not die for her. Gannon then stabs Neil through the stomach with the White Sword. Neil awakens in his apartment where he was playing the Legend of Zelda, and notices the heart meter still on his wrist. The game provides him the option to continue or quit.

=== Season 3 (2010) ===
==== Regular episodes ====
Title	Writer(s)	Director	Original airdate	Musical Guest(s)	Ssn #	Srs #
"Quitters Never Continue"	Tony Janning and Sandeep Parikh	Sandeep Parikh	July 25, 2010	None	1	14
The episode starts with the summary of the second season. Neil is now living back in New Jersey. He fixed his work problems and at the time of the episode is the assistant manager. He also got back his apartment and his girlfriend. After learning that his mom is dead and his family has been lying to him all along, Neil uses the same method as before to transport himself back into the game, where he finds a retired Old Man and a pregnant Fairy.
"The Gloffice"	Tony Janning and Sandeep Parikh	Sandeep Parikh	August 10, 2010	Molly Lewis	2	15
Wizrobe tells Gannon about Link's continue. Neil beats Level 4, kills a two-headed dragon, then returns to Level 5 and kills Dark Nut after discovering his weakness: Dark Nut has no backside body armor. The episode is mostly filmed as an "Office" parody featuring Gannon, Wizrobe, Zelda, a Moblin named Blight, and one of Dark Nut's relatives, where they discuss Link's continued success, and the defeat of Dark Nut and the Level 5 boss, a one-eyed parasite.
"Fairyhood"	Tony Janning and Sandeep Parikh	Sandeep Parikh	August 27, 2010	Paul and Storm	3	16
While searching for Level 6, Neil stumbles across two giant armoured men (guest stars The Sklar Brothers), that briefly come to life when touched. They toss Neil around like a Football, leaving him badly injured, before freezing after he goes off-screen. He walks through the woods to find the Fairy's house, where she is having babies. After looking after them to keep the Fairy from eating them due to "Maternal Hunger" he asks to be healed but the Fairy refuses to have sex with him, annoyed by his long absence and lack of caring. Neil, partially healed due to his time spent watching the children, then uses the Warp Whistle to attempt to find Level 6. Instead, he lands on a battlefield where he meets Princess Zelda's brother, Tyrelda.
"40 Acres and a Zol"	Tony Janning and Sandeep Parikh	Sandeep Parikh	September 7, 2010	Jason Charles Miller	4	17
Neil fights alongside Tyrelda, whom commands the 54th Brigade. He reveals that he is Zelda's last living brother. In course of the fight, the entire brigade fights alongside Neil, thinking he is Nail. They are all overpowered and captured by the centaur. After they "lynel" one of the soldiers, Neil fights an orange parasite, who swallows him and eats his shield; Neil escapes from the monster's jaws. In the midst of avoiding the angry Lynels' sword beams, Neil impresses them with his dance moves and infuriates their leader into a dance contest. Tyrelda and his surviving trooper escapes their bonds and buys time with their lives for Neil to escape to rescue Zelda. Neil returns to Fairy, only to discover her leaving for her mother's place and that their children had been captured in his absence. He is left alone in the woods, pondering what to do next.
"Every Hero Needs a Montage"	Tony Janning and Sandeep Parikh	Sandeep Parikh	September 19, 2010	Garfunkel and Oates	5	18
Neil heads back to Old Man to help on his quest. He apologizes for quitting earlier, prompting Old Man to forgive him and give him the three-day training course he missed at the beginning. Old Man trains Neil in strength, endurance, dancing, monsters, and frolicking on the beach, and gives him some more Heart Containers. When he's finished Old Man sees Link off, and tells him to seek out the Magical Sword in the Graveyard of Living Nightmares. After arriving at the graveyard a frightened Neil encounters a doppelganger of himself wearing his gas station outfit. The episode ends with Neil saying "Fu-" and the doppelganger finishing with "-ck."
"Death Becomes Neil"	Tony Janning and Sandeep Parikh	Sandeep Parikh	October 3, 2010	Hard 'n' Phirm	6	19
Neil faces his deepest, darkest, douchiest fears. He faces his doppelganger, who calls him a loser and shapeshifts into his girlfriend and different family members, and Neil then exclaims his name to be Link and shoves his sword through the doppelganger, destroying it. Neil Then meets Old Man who gives him the Magical Sword. Ganon is then seen painting a picture of Princess Zelda using silver paint, (Wizzrobe also reminds Gannon that he is allergic to silver paint, that is useful in the next episode.) and is informed by Wizrobe that Neil has beaten levels 6 and 7. Ganon then charges Wizrobe with Defending level 8.
"Restart of the King"	Tony Janning and Sandeep Parikh	Sandeep Parikh	October 27, 2010	Jonathan Coulton	7	20
Series Finale. Neil falls through Spectacle Rock and into Level 9. After fighting through the level and finding Ganon, Neil tries his best to use his weapons against Ganon but he just destroys them and turns invisible. After a few fireball hits, Neil is near death before Old Man returns to battle Ganon. While Old Man distracts Ganon, the Fairy reconciles with Neil and restores him to full health. Ganon kills Old Man, but a fully healed Neil reengages the battle and goads Ganon into fighting hand to hand. Neil gains the upper hand and is about to defeat Ganon when Ganon cheats and begins using fireballs. When Neil is once again almost dead and Ganon holds him from behind, the Fairy attempts to heal him once more, but Wizzrobe intervenes and grabs the Fairy. Neil convinces Wizzrobe to switch sides, and Wizzrobe throws Neil an arrow dipped in silver (also Ganon hits Wizzrobe with a fireball), with which Neil stabs himself with it and it stabs Ganon from behind. Wizzrobe survives the attack but Fairy doesn't. After promising to Fairy about not having sex with anybody (not even himself), Neil retrieves the Triforce of Power from Ganon's remains and frees Princess Zelda. They marry and Neil becomes king. It is then revealed that Wizzrobe is now working for Neil, although he often misses Ganon. Link has integrated the schools to which he sends his fairy children Oold Man's ghost gets laid and Wizrobe is thankful for the new king legalizing gay marriage. Later, while sitting on the toilet, Neil is sucked through the pipes and comes out dressed as Mario. He encounters his brother, dressed as Luigi, and the two discuss their surroundings. Realizing where he is, Neil and his brother say "Oh, fu-" but they are cut off by a Fade to Black. In a post-credits scene, the title "Super Grimsley Bros." appears while Neil's brother, Darrel, tells him about jumping, smashing blocks, and the Super Star ("pure, uncut cocaine for 15 seconds" as he calls it). While Darrel is rapidly searching on Neil for a Super Star, Wizzrobe, back at the castle, stands on a balcony and is shown a locket with a picture of Ganon, saying "You were just too ugly for this world, my Lord." Just then, a ghostly image of Ganon's hand appears, smacks Wizzrobe in the face, says, "I know Wizzrobe. I miss me too." and Wizzrobes smiles while holding his staff.

==== Minisodes ====
Title	Writer(s)	Director	Original airdate	#
"The Gloffice: The Plight of Blight"	Gabe Uhr	Sandeep Parikh	August 17, 2010	1
A continuation of the parody of The Office as seen in the episode "The Gloffice".
"Armos Banter"	improvised	Sandeep Parikh	August 31, 2010	2
Guest starring Randy and Jason Sklar.
"Elf vs. Wild"	improvised	Sandeep Parikh	September 13, 2010	3
Alex Albrecht stars in this parody of nature shows, such as those hosted by Steve Irwin or Jeff Corwin. Sandeep Parikh premiered this clip during The Legend of Neil Comic-Con panel in 2010.
"Dirty Old Man Dancing"	improvised	Sandeep Parikh	September 28, 2010	4
A parody of the film Dirty Dancing.
"Glarry Botter and the Orphan/Teacher Conference"	Gabe Uhr	Sean Becker	October 11, 2010	5
A parody of the Harry Potter series.
