= Baldur's Gate: Descent into Avernus =

Tabletop role-playing game adventure

- Standard edition cover, illustrated by Tyler Jacobson.
- Rules required: Dungeons & Dragons 5th edition
- Character levels: 1–13
- Campaign setting: Forgotten Realms
- Authors: Christopher Perkins
- First published: September 17, 2019
- Pages: 256
- ISBN: 0786966769

Baldur's Gate: Descent into Avernus is an adventure module for the 5th edition of the Dungeons & Dragons fantasy role-playing game. It serves as a prologue to the video game Baldur's Gate III. Christopher Perkins, Dungeons & Dragons Principal Narrative Designer, described the module as "Dungeons & Dragons meets Mad Max: Fury Road".

== Plot summary ==
Baldur's Gate: Descent into Avernus is a 256-page campaign book that takes the players from level 1 to level 13. It starts in the city of Baldur's Gate "as it slowly succumbs to the sway of corrupt powers and evil gods". The adventurers go on a search for redemption as they descend into Avernus, the first layer of the Nine Hells, which is ruled by the Archdevil Zariel. Players also have the option of wading into the Blood War. Cameron Kunzelman, for Paste, wrote that "there is an appendix of about 50 pages that is just focused on Baldur's Gate as a location", noting that it is a useful resource for running campaigns set just in this location.

Chris Perkins, Principal Story Designer for Dungeons & Dragons, said:

I like to think of it as A Tale of Two Cities. One city has fallen under the sway of hell, the other is in danger of suffering the same fate unless you step in and do something about it. [...] It is a scary environment. The threats you're facing are not typical. [...] There's nothing stopping the characters from getting in the middle of [the Blood War] because it is actually happening. You come upon these great forces colliding and you see the carnage going on. It would take a brave party of adventurers to want to step [sic] foot into that, but they can. And it's a case where we want the characters to have discussion among themselves: If we involve ourselves, are we going to change anything? Or are we just throwing ourselves into needless danger? It sets up really interesting conversation for the table. You're down there to save a city. But there's all kinds of temptations in hell.

== Publication history ==
The new module was announced in May 2019 during the D&D: The Descent livestreamed event on the Wizards of the Coast's Twitch site. Baldur's Gate: Descent into Avernus was released on September 17. An alternate art cover by the artist Hydro74 featuring the symbol of Bhaal, an important figure in the Baldur's Gate video game series, is available exclusively in local game stores.

Beadle & Grimm, a Wizards of the Coast licensee, released a limited run special "Platinum Edition" of Baldur's Gate: Descent into Avernus. Baldur's Gate: Descent into Avernus is also available as a digital product through the following Wizards of the Coast licensees: D&D Beyond, Fantasy Grounds, and Roll20.

Story consultant Joe Manganiello, in an interview, discussed how his character Arkhan the Cruel (as seen on web shows like Critical Role and Force Grey) fits into the book, saying that Arkhan will have his own tower in Avernus, the first level of Hell, along with several villainous compatriots. Manganiello told ComicBook.com that one of Arkhan's companions is a snapping turtle-esque Death Cleric Tortle, who he hopes will change how Tortles (a race of anthropomorphic turtles) are perceived. He is described as a Dr. Mindbender type, according to him. Although Arkhan resides in Hell and is trying to bring his evil goddess to the Material Plane, Manganiello does not see Arkhan as a villain:

Well, I hate to use the word villain. [...] I hate it when it's used to describe my characters because I just think there are different characters coming at life from different angles. A lot of people accused Arkhan of stealing the Hand of Vecna as some sort of power grab. But it wasn't, it was a completely altruistic gesture of a high level paladin putting his god before his own well-being. He handcuffed himself to this artifact that will destroy him, that will corrupt his mind and his body in order to try to unlock the secret to freeing Tiamat from Avernus.

== Reception ==
In Publishers Weekly's "Best-selling Books Week Ending 9/21/19", Baldur's Gate: Descent into Avernus was #5 in "Hardcover Nonfiction", and sold 12,731 units.

Charlie Hall, for Polygon, wrote: "overall I'm extremely impressed with Descent Into Avernus. It's easily the best adventure module that Wizards has put out all year, and a tremendous value given the amount of material inside. It's also an interesting prequel to the upcoming computer game, Baldur's Gate 3, from Larian Studios". Cameron Kunzelman of Paste wrote that the book "is, in a word, good" and that the book does well both when stripped down to parts and when it is a contained narrative. Kunzelman highlighted that the book introduces players "slowly into the weirdness of this world, gives them a lot of options and factions to play with in hell, and then puts them as important agents in a plot to save or damn a city, a ruler, and even themselves. These are the kind of meaty questions that I think players like to dig into, and there's an ample number of them here".

Cody Gravelle, for Screen Rant, commented that "players got their first taste of what to expect from the new campaign thanks to a star-studded lineup that kicked off D&D Live 2019" and highlighted the actual play which featured Deborah Ann Woll, Matthew Lillard and Janina Gavankar. Gravelle stated that this "adventure feels like a big deal, more than they have in the past — the infusion of celebrities being part of the reveal festivities, and popular culture embracing roleplaying in a way it hasn't previously, have made these sorts of reveals much more electric". Eric Francisco, for Inverse, wrote that "one of the biggest features in Descent Into Avernus is vehicular combat. Spinning off from the ship mechanics introduced in Ghosts of Saltmarsh, Descent Into Avernus features thundering nightmares, 'Infernal War Machines' that really sell what kind of wasteland players will find themselves in the new campaign". Francisco also highlighted two characters from D&D lore which appear in the module: "Zariel, archdevil of the Nine Hells and ruler of Avernus, Kostchtchie, demon lord of frost giants, and Arkhan the Cruel, the dragonborn paladin of actor Joe Manganiello (True Blood, Magic Mike)".
