= Satine Phoenix =

American former pornographic film actress (born 1979 or 1980)

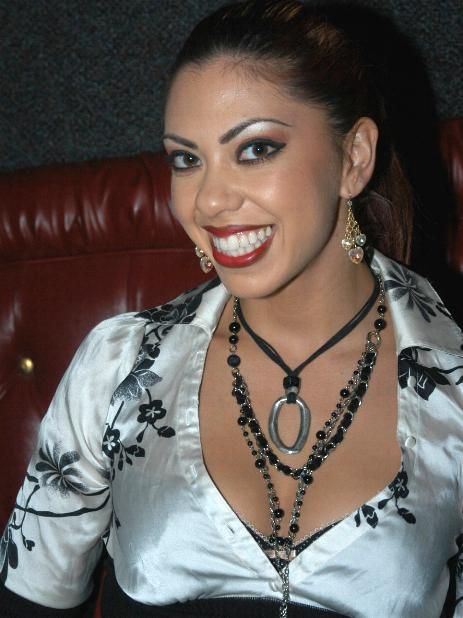
- Phoenix in 2007
- Born: 1979 or 1980
- Occupations: Comic book illustrator; cosplayer; model
- Years active: 2006–present

Satine Phoenix (born 1979 or 1980) is an American comic book illustrator, cosplayer, and model. She is the co-creator, with writer R.K. Syrus, of the graphic novel New Praetorians and the founder of CelebrityChariD20 (formerly CelebrityCharityDnD).

== Career ==
=== Adult entertainment ===
Phoenix was a stripper in San Francisco before entering the pornographic film industry in 2006. Phoenix was also very open about her interest in sadomasochism and bondage, and she came in fourth place for Best Comic Artist at the Bondage Awards in 2010.

In a 2006 report for the news website AlterNet, journalist Annalee Newitz referred to her as "the sort of person who has the education and resources to choose from many careers and has chosen this one because she likes it".

=== Mainstream media ===
Phoenix has accepted projects in gaming and fetish fashion, cosplaying characters from various D&D games, and modeling in latex and leather. Notable projects include Pen, Paper & Laser Guns and her role in co-developing the gaming web series I Hit It with My Axe, which was distributed through online magazine The Escapist. In 2008, Phoenix appeared in an episode of the WE tv series Secret Lives of Women and was a guest on the Fox talk show The Morning Show with Mike and Juliet. Phoenix has been portrayed by many artists, including Swedish punk painter Karl Backman and American photographer Chad Michael Ward. In 2013, she appeared in the Javier Grillo-Marxuach's short film Minotaur.

In 2010, she revived her art and gaming career at Meltdown Comics in Hollywood, California by starting DrawMelt (a life drawing class with cosplay models) and DnDMelt (a gaming community focused around Dungeons & Dragons). Phoenix has organized and hosted "Celebrity Charity Dungeons & Dragons", a charity event to raise funds for Reach Out and Read. She has also done live performance art with the San Francisco group "Zen Bullies," body painting, a bondage burlesque show, and had a weekly radio show on KSEXradio.

Phoenix has both appeared in and hosted a number of episodes on Geek & Sundry as well as episodes on HyperRPG: Phoenix appeared in seasons three and four of the TableTop web series with Wil Wheaton; and in 2017 she hosted the second season of Game Master Tips, a YouTube video series for Dungeon Masters in Dungeons & Dragons and gamemasters in other tabletop role-playing games. Season two of GM Tips expanded on the original format through Phoenix interviewing notable players in the tabletop role-playing community. The second season ended with Phoenix interviewing the host of the first season, Matthew Mercer, in December 2017. She was the community manager of Wizards of the Coast's Dungeons and Dragons arm from 2018 to 2019.

Phoenix and Ruty Rutenberg co-founded the streaming network Maze Arcana which produced several official actual play Dungeons & Dragons web series such as Maze Arcana: Fury's Reach (2017), Maze Arcana: Fury's Fate (2017–18), Sirens of the Realms (2017–19), and Maze Arcana: Inkwell Society (2018–19). Phoenix was also a Dungeon Master or player in these shows. The 2018 Diana Jones Award was awarded to the "actual play" movement and included Maze Arcana among the examples of the genre. Phoenix, Ruttenberg and Ivan Van Norman accepted the award at Gen Con. However, the network then went dark in 2018; in 2022, ComicBook.com reported that Rutenberg and Phoenix are suing each other over the handling of Maze Arcana's funds and fiduciary duty.

In 2019, Phoenix founded the livestream production company Gilding Light. In 2021, Apotheosis Studios – founded by Jamison Stone – launched a Kickstarter campaign for Phoenix's campaign setting book, which reached its funding goal, the book titled Sirens: Battle of the Bards.

In June 2022, over a dozen former collaborators alleged bullying and mistreatment by Phoenix and her husband Stone. Satine issued an apology "stating that she was sorry for 'being the cause' of her accuser's pain and for enabling Stone's 'terrible behavior.'" Since the allegations, several organizations have formally cut ties with Phoenix and Stone including Level Up Dice, D&D In a Castle, Jasper's Game Day and the McElroy Brothers.

== Awards and nominations ==
Year	Award	Category	Work	Result	Notes
2007	Adultcon Award	Best Actress in an Intercourse Performance	Hardcore Training #6	Nominated	
2020	ENNIE Awards	Best Electronic Book	Uncaged Vol III	Silver Winner	Contributing author

== Personal life ==
Phoenix stated that she began playing Dungeons & Dragons in 1988 at eight years-old.

In 2022, Phoenix married Jamison Stone at Gary Con; the ceremony was officiated by Luke Gygax and was an event at the convention.

== Publications ==
- Burning Quill: A Collection of Illustrations and Other Art Work of Satine Phoenix. CreateSpace. 2010. ISBN 978-1-4515-2002-6.
