= Tanya DePass =

American journalist, activist and streamer

Tanya Colleen DePass
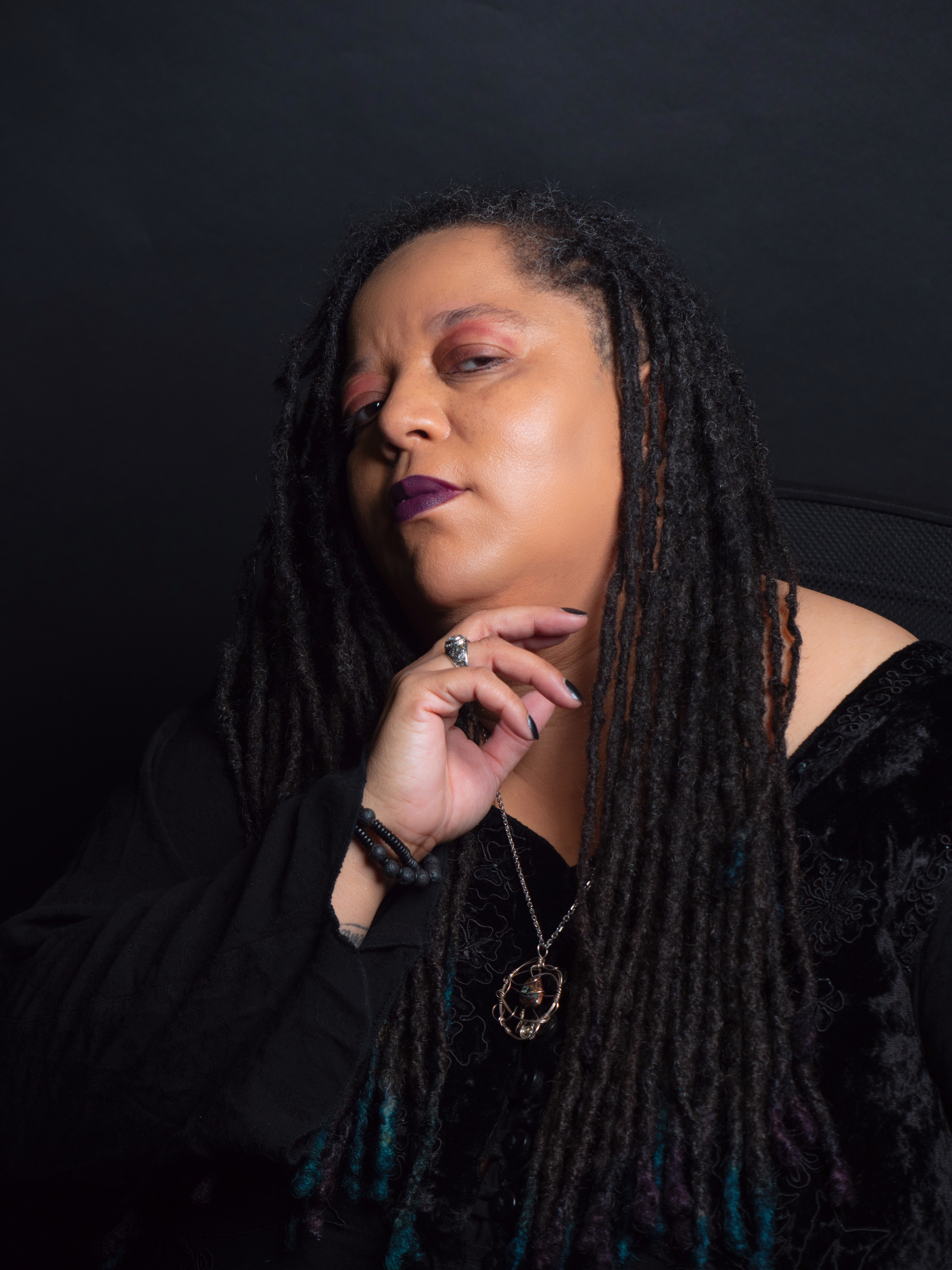
- Born: 1973 (age 52–53); Chicago, Illinois, U.S.
- Years active: 2014–present

Tanya DePass (born 1973), also known by her username Cypheroftyr, is an American journalist, activist and streamer. She is the founder of the non-profit organization I Need Diverse Games, which she established in 2016.

== Early life ==
DePass grew up in a poor family in Chicago. She has been a fan of tabletop and video games from her early childhood. She has recalled that "games were another way to flex my imagination. I loved reading, and I treated it as an extension of being able to read and go to these different places – in games you can literally visit another world... It was an escape, it was relaxing, it was formative"; she stated that she learned Black and queer characters were only given "incidental" roles and that "people who look like me" were not "full character[s]...who get to save the world".

== Career ==
DePass has written articles on topics of diversity, feminism, and race, for publications including Polygon and Vice, and provides diversity consultation services to game development studios and organizations. She is the programming & diversity coordinator for OrcaCon and GaymerX. DePass is the editor of Game Devs & Others: Tales from the Margins (2018), an anthology of essays from games industry professionals and players who felt marginalized by the industry. Additionally, she is a 2020 Annenberg Innovation Lab Civic Media Fellow at USC.

DePass is the co-developer for the Fifth Season RPG, based on N. K. Jemisin's Broken Earth trilogy (2020). Her work has been featured in the Victoria and Albert Museum's Design/Play/Disrupt exhibit.

Online, DePass goes by the username Cypheroftyr. She is a streamer on Twitch, where she has faced harassment. In 2020, during the George Floyd protests, DePass ran a charity stream to raise funds for The Bail Project—the stream raised over US$140,000 in a single day.

Fireside Magazine, for which DePass was the special features editor, was nominated for a Hugo Award for Best Semiprozine in 2019. In 2020, the Diana Jones Award was devoted to "Black Excellence in Gaming", with the committee awarding two dozen black people in the industry specifically, including DePass. Kotaku named DePass one of their 4 "Gamers of the Year" for 2020. She was also named one of the inaugural Future Class at The Game Awards 2020.

Her work to make the industry more inclusive has been highlighted in the film Game Changer, directed by basketball player Tina Charles. The short documentary premiered at Tribeca 2021.

=== I Need Diverse Games ===
In 2014, DePass used the hashtag #INeedDiverseGames while responding to a statement from Ubisoft claiming that it would not be feasible to animate female characters for the upcoming Assassin's Creed game. DePass has said she is "sick of games where I don't get to be the hero". Despite pre-dating the controversy, the hashtag became particularly popular during the Gamergate harassment campaign, when it was one of several used in anti-Gamergate tweets. Tweets using the hashtag were primarily those sharing positive messages about a desire for increased diversity and broader representation in video games.

DePass founded a non-profit using the name I Need Diverse Games in August 2016. The organization, based in Chicago, aimed to support visibility and access for underrepresented people within the video games industry, and was funded through Patreon and fundraising campaigns. One of the organization's initiatives was to provide financial support and passes to video game conferences such as the Game Developers Conference. In 2020, I Need Diverse Games ceased its scholarship program after the pandemic. The organization also ran seminars on diversity at other games industry events, and highlighted the work of underrepresented people. The foundation lost its charity status, its website shut down, and ceased donations in 2024.

=== Web series ===
DePass was a member of the Dungeons & Dragons Rivals of Waterdeep actual play livestream, which features a cast of people of color. The show began in 2018 in Chicago as an official Wizards of the Coast production, broadcast on the official Dungeons & Dragons Twitch channel and concluded in 2023. In 2021, DePass was a player in The Black Dice Society, a Ravenloft themed Dungeons & Dragons actual play show on the official Wizards of the Coast channels. She was also the creative director of the Cortex actual play series Into the Mother Lands. Based on the series, DePass funded Into the Mother Lands - An Original Afrofuturist TTRPG on Kickstarter in 2021, raising $360,606, with a projected release in September 2022. As of November 2026, the project is still in development, with no updated timeline given.
