= Anjali Bhimani =

American actress

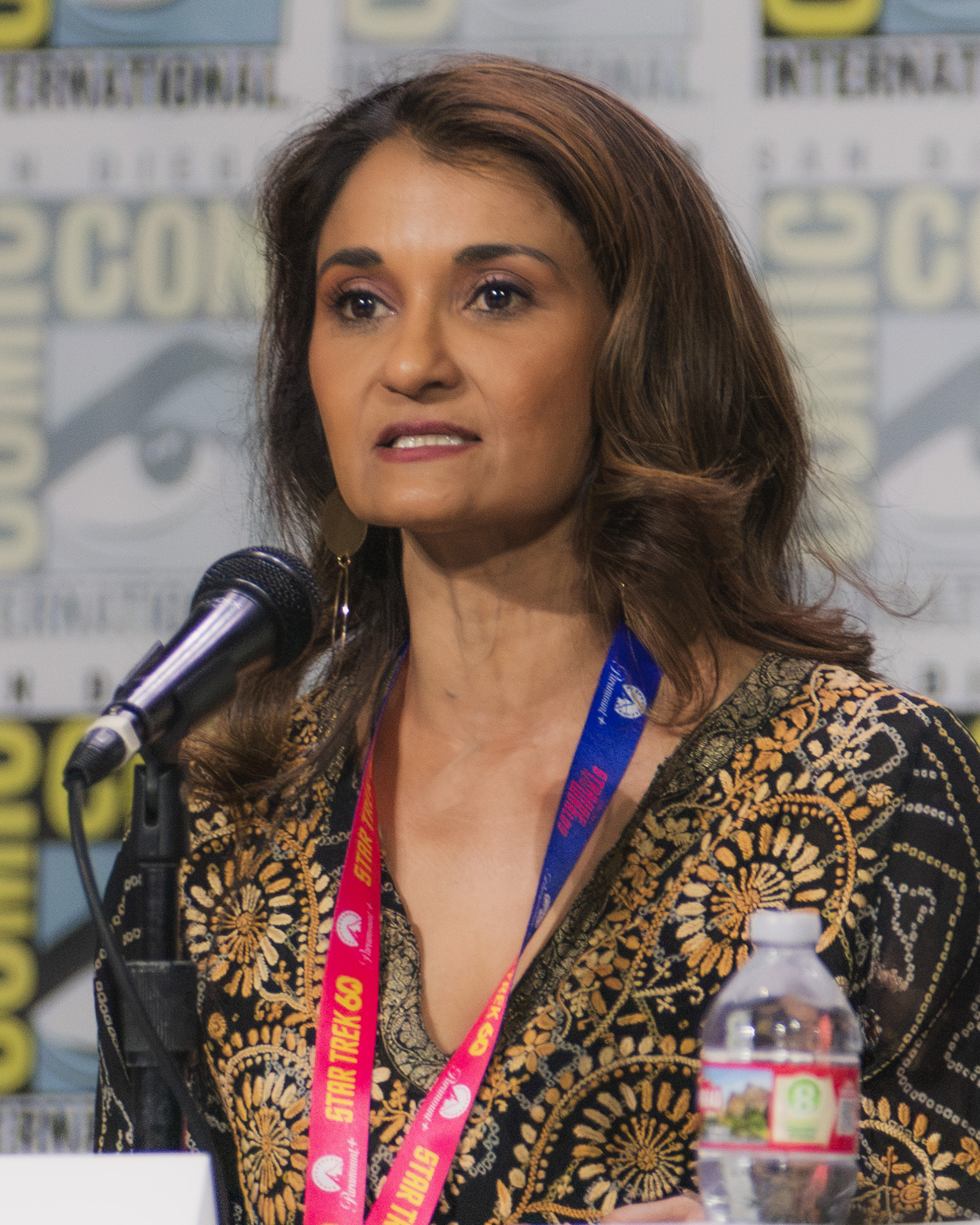
- Bhimani at San Diego Comic Con 2026
- Born: Cleveland, Ohio, U.S.
- Occupation: Actress
- Years active: 1997–present
- Website: anjalibhimani.com

Anjali Bhimani is an American actress best known for voicing Symmetra in the video game Overwatch and Rampart in the video game Apex Legends.

== Early life ==
Bhimani was born in Cleveland, Ohio, the daughter of doctors Ela and Bharat Bhimani. She is of Indian Sindhi descent and grew up in Orange County, California. She attended Northwestern University.

== Career ==
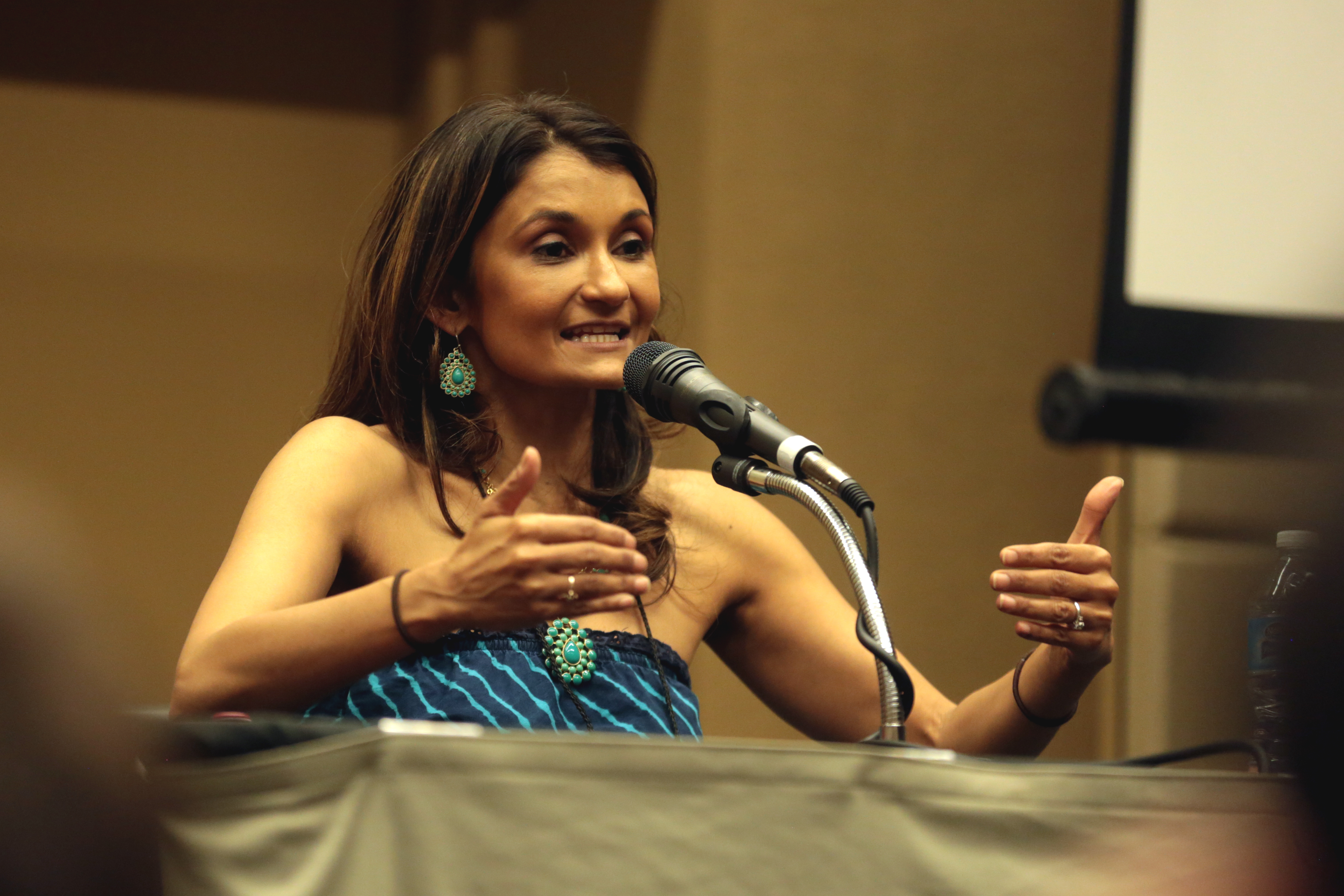
Bhimani in August 2017

Bhimani's long time collaboration with Mary Zimmerman began in 1997 when she appeared as an Indian princess in Mirror of the Invisible World, adapted from the 12th century Persian epic Haft Peykar. She played Greek mythological character Myrrha in Zimmerman-directed Metamorphoses's world premiere produced by Lookingglass Theatre Company in 1998 and its Off-Broadway opening at the Second Stage Theatre in 2001. Drama critic Albert Williams, in his review for the Chicago Reader, called Bhimani a "stunning dancer". She made her Broadway debut when Metamorphoses opened at Circle in the Square Theatre (2002).

In 2004, Bhimani became an understudy for Ayesha Dharker and Madhur Jaffrey's characters in Andrew Lloyd Webber's musical Bombay Dreams. During the play's The Broadway Theatre production Dharker left the play and Bhimani took over her role. She appeared as The Sparrow in Czech opera Brundibár (2006). Quake, a play Bhimani co-produced and co-directed opened at the Open Fist Theatre Company's First Look Festival of New Plays in 2011. For The Jungle Book she re-teamed with Zimmerman and played the role of mother wolf in its 2013 Goodman Theatre production.

Bhimani has appeared in TV series including All My Children, Law & Order: Special Victims Unit, The Sopranos, Journeyman, Shark, Flight of the Conchords, and Modern Family. She voiced the character Symmetra in the first-person shooter video game Overwatch, and shared the 2016 Behind the Voice Actors Award for Best Vocal Ensemble in a Video Game with her co-voice actors for the game.

In 2021, she guest starred on Exandria Unlimited, a spinoff of the actual play web series Critical Role. In 2023, she played Queen Amangeaux Epicée du Peche in Dimension 20: The Ravening War. In March 2025, she released her first Dungeons & Dragons adventure module – titled The Malady of Minarrh – on D&D Beyond via her company Road to Ithaka Press.

== Books ==
In 2023 Bhimani wrote a book, I Am Fun Size, and So Are You! Thoughts from a Tiny Human on Living a Giant Life, based on her YouTube series of the same name.

== Philanthrophy ==
In 2024 Bhimani started an annual fundraiser called "The Puppy Roll". The event is a fundraiser for the Petco Love charity in which Dungeons & Dragons players use characters based on their pets. Bhumani has been playing D&D since she was eight years old and started in the event after the passing of her dog, Charlie.

== Filmography ==
=== Film ===
Year	Title	Role	Notes
2001	The Medicine Show	Food Swiling Wench	
2009	Confessions of a Shopaholic	Girl 1	
2015	Miss India America	Pinky Matthews	
2015	Dark Intentions	Dr. Maya	
2017	Trafficked	Sheela	
2020	Evil Eye	Radhika	
2020	All My Life	Mina White	
2021	Seal Team	Crabby Stabby, Female Great White shark, Seal (voice)	

=== Television ===
Year	Title	Role	Notes
2004, 2006, 2022	Law & Order: Special Victims Unit	Mrs. Chadoury, Dr. Faroup, Nisha Singh	4 episodes
2004, 2008, 2010–2011	All My Children	Rape Victim, Nurse No. 1, Nurse No. 2, Nurse	8 episodes
2006	The Sopranos	Dr. Budraja	2 episodes
2007	Shark	Miranda Carlson	2 episodes
2007	Journeyman	Cynthia McNaughton	Episode: "Keepers"
2009	Flight of the Conchords	Potential Client No. 2	Episode: "A New Cup"
2009	Lie to Me	Young Woman	Uncredited; Episode: "Life Is Priceless"
2010–2011	Outsourced	Sari Vendor	2 episodes
2011–2015	Modern Family	Nina Patel	3 episodes
2011	The Young and the Restless	Medical Examiner, Coroner	Episode: "Kevin & Chloe Are Accused of Murder"
2011	Law & Order: LA	Hallie Capshaw	Episode: "Van Nuys"
2011	I'm in the Band	Tisha Bell	Episode: "Trippnotized"
2012	Pretty Little Liars	Miss Pervis	Episode: "Let the Water Hold Me Down"
2012	Ringer	Dr. Rao	Episode: "If You're Just an Evil Bitch Then Get Over It"
2012	Common Law	Veterinarian	Episode: "Joint Custody"
2012	Necessary Roughness	Parveena Jeevan	Episode: "Spell It Out"
2012	Hollywood Heights	Doctor	2 episodes
2013	Second Shot	Bobbi Newton	Episode: "You Can't Go Home Again. So Why Am I Here?"
2013	Save Me	Dr. Malikay	Episode: "The Book of Beth"
2014	Bones	Satima Najjar	Episode: "The Turn in the Urn"
2014	Mighty Med	Dr. Bridges	Episode: "Are You Afraid of the Shark"
2014	Criminal Minds	Dr. Rasgotra	Episode: "Boxed In"
2015	Dog with a Blog	Receptionist	Episode: "Stan Has Puppies: Part 1"
2015	The Fosters	Dr. Melvoy	Episode: "It's My Party"
2015	NCIS: Los Angeles	Mira Yacoob	Episode: "Defectors"
2015	Adoptable	Jasmine Bidhani	4 episodes
2016	Criminal Minds: Beyond Borders	Hasina	Episode: "Harvested"
2016	Silicon Valley	D.A.	Episode: "To Build a Better Beta"
2017	Cassandra French's Finishing School	Wendy	6 episodes
2017	Doubt	Maya Reyez	Episode: "Finally"
2017	Kevin (Probably) Saves the World	Susan Alan	Episode: "Dave"
2017	Wisdom of the Crowd	Mrs. Bakari	Episode: "Alpha Test"
2017–2018	Suspense	Doctor Brightfall, Sergeant Bhatti	2 episodes
2018	Young Sheldon	Zero	Episode: "Demons, Sunday School, and Prime Numbers"
2018	Grace and Frankie	Raha	Episode: "The Home"
2018	NCIS	Samantha Petrie	Episode: "Family Ties"
2018	A.P. Bio	Sarika's Mom	Episode: "Freakin' Enamored"
2018	Alex, Inc.	Joya	2 episodes
2018	Crazy Ex-Girlfriend	Director	Episode: "I'm Making Up for Lost Time"
2018	The Resident	Dr. Irena Simmons	Episode: "The Dance"
2019	S.W.A.T.	Agent Ellen Benson	2 episodes
2019	Station 19	Dr. Mukerji	Episode: "Crazy Train"
2019	Arranged	Seema Patel	Episode: "Pilot"
2019	Wizard School Dropout	Andy's Mom	2 episodes
2019	Runaways	Mita Nansari	2 episodes
2020	The Casagrandes	Padma (voice)	Episode: "Fast Feud"
2020	Blindspot	Susan Shah	2 episodes
2020	Little Voice	Reema	2 episodes
2020–22	It's Pony	Gerry's Mom, Nurse, Leanne Murray, additional voices	
2020–23	The Loud House	Jesse Hiller (voice)	3 episodes
2021	Special	Bina Laghari	3 episodes
2021	The Neighborhood	Suraya	Episode: "Welcome to Your Match"
2022	The Legend of Vox Machina	Head Cleric (voice)	
2022	Ms. Marvel	Aunt Ruby	4 episodes; Disney+ series
2022	Dead to Me	Dr. Ashman	3 episodes
2023	Kung Fu Panda: The Dragon Knight	Padma (voice)	4 episodes
2023	9-1-1: Lone Star	Hannah	Episode: "Tommy Dearest"
2023	The Blacklist	Jemma Parikh	Episode: "The Nowhere Bride (No. 192)"
2023	Mech Cadets	Patty Patel, Charlotte Tanaka-Park (voice)	4 episodes
2023	All Rise	Dr. Tanya Barkley	Episode: "Guilt Is a Bully"
2024	X-Men '97	Daria, News Anchor (voice)	Episode: "Tolerance Is Extinction Pt. 1"
2024	Grown-ish	Sonia	Episode: "I Wish You Roses"
2024	Tomb Raider: The Legend of Lara Croft	Waitress, Guest #1 (voice)	Episode: "A Single Step"
2024	Tales of the Teenage Mutant Ninja Turtles	Ms. Khatri (voice)	
2025	Creature Commandos	Assistant 2, Principal (voice)	Episode: "A Very Funny Monster"
2026	For All Mankind (TV series)	Ms. Joshi	2 episodes
2026-present	Avatar: Seven Havens	Saumya, Tala, Various voices (voice)	

=== Video games ===
Year	Title	Role	Notes
2016	Fallout 4: Nuka-World	Nisha	DLC
2016	Overwatch	Symmetra	
2017	Uncharted: The Lost Legacy	Additional Voices	
2019	Indivisible	Kala	
2019	Apex Legends	Rampart	
2020	Final Fantasy VII Remake	Additional Voices	
2020	Fallout 76: Steel Dawn	Yasmin Chowdhury	DLC (Patch)
2022	Overwatch 2	Symmetra	
2023	Stray Gods: The Roleplaying Musical	Medusa	
2023	Starfield	Commander Natara	
2023	The Lamplighters League	Purnima, Mother Amina	
2023	Marvel's Spider-Man 2	Kraven's Hunters	
2023	Diablo IV	Izel, Additional voices	
2025	Avowed	Yatzli	
2025	Sunderfolk	All Characters	
2025	MindsEye	Shiva Vega	
2025	Date Everything!	Bathsheba	
2025	Call of Duty: Black Ops 7	Priya Zaveri	
2026	Order of the Sinking Star	The Bard, The Surveyor	
TBA	Emberville	Unannounced role	In production

=== Web series ===
Year	Title	Role	Notes
2018–2019	We're Alive: Frontier	Stingray	Main role; actual play series by Geek & Sundry and Legendary Digital Networks
2019	UnDeadwood	Miriam Landisman	Main role; actual play limited series by Critical Role Productions
2020–2025	Critical Role (one-shots)	The Pain Elemental	Episode: "Doom Eternal One-Shot"; actual play special by Critical Role Productions
2020–2025	Critical Role (one-shots)	Fy'ra Rai	Episode: "Guest Battle Royale"
2020–2025	Critical Role (one-shots)	Ylva Ilende	Episode: "Delve into Dawnshore"
2021	Exandria Unlimited	Fy'ra Rai	Guest role; 3 episodes
2022	Exandria Unlimited: Kymal	Fy'ra Rai	Main role; 2 episodes
2023	Dimension 20: The Ravening War	Lady Amangeaux Epicée du Peche	Main role; 6 episodes
2023	Candela Obscura: The Circle of the Vassal & the Veil	Charlotte Eaves	Main role; 3 episodes
2023–2024	DesiQuest	Sitara	Main role
2024	Critical Role (campaign three)	Fy'ra Rai	Guest role; 2 episodes
2025	Tales From Woodcreek	Victoria "Vix" Strong	Main role; actual play series by The Dungeon Dudes YouTube channel

=== Stage ===
Year	Title	Role	Venue	Notes
2025	Dungeons & Dragons: The Twenty-Sided Tavern	Warrior	Stage 42	Featured player
2025	Dungeons & Dragons: The Twenty-Sided Tavern	Mischief	Broadway Playhouse at Water Tower Place	
