= Critical Role (disambiguation) =

Critical Role is a web series in which a group of professional voice actors broadcast their Dungeons & Dragons game via Twitch, YouTube and Beacon.

- Critical Role campaign one, the first season of the web series
- Critical Role campaign two, the second season of the web series
- Critical Role campaign three, the third season of the web series
- Critical Role campaign four, the fourth season of the web series

Critical Role may also refer to:

- Critical Role: Vox Machina Origins, a comic book series that serves as a prequel to the first campaign of the web series
- Critical Role Productions, the studio company setup by the cast to produce the web series and manage the cast's intellectual property rights in relation to the series

== See also ==
- The Legend of Vox Machina (working title Critical Role: The Legend of Vox Machina), the animated series based on the first campaign of the web series
