= Marisha Ray =

American voice actress

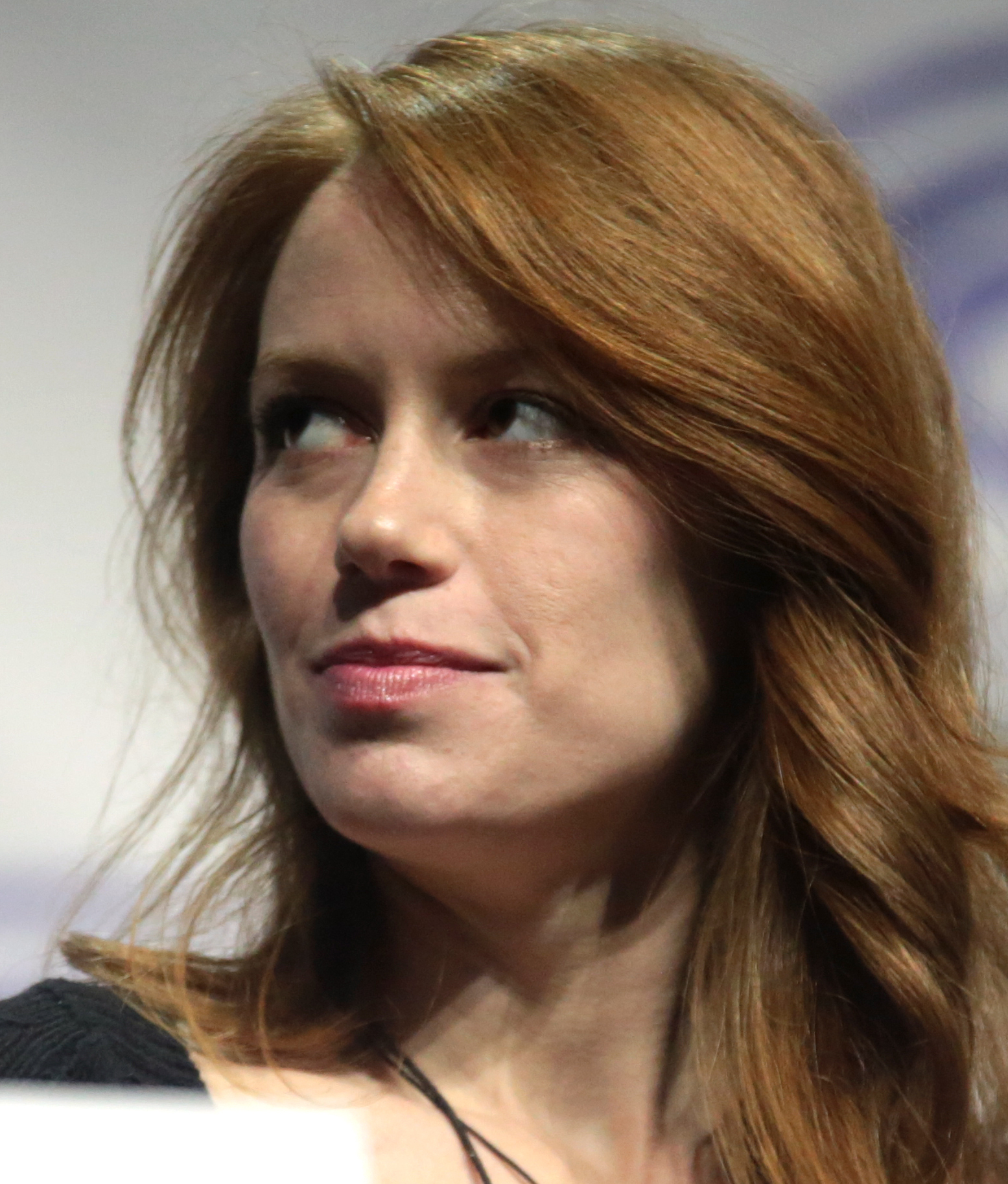
- Ray in April 2017
- Born: Marisha Ray Huber; Mount Washington, Kentucky, U.S.
- Occupations: Voice actress; host; producer; creative director
- Years active: 2005–present
- Spouse: Matthew Mercer (m. 2017)

Marisha Ray Huber is an American voice actress, host, producer, and creative director. She is best known for portraying herself and characters Keyleth, Beauregard, Laudna and Murray on the Dungeons & Dragons web series Critical Role. Her video game voice roles include Margaret in Persona 4 Arena Ultimax and Persona Q, Laura S. Arseid in The Legend of Heroes: Trails of Cold Steel series, Miranda in Metal Gear: Survive, and Effie in Fire Emblem Heroes.

== Early life ==
Marisha Ray Huber was born in Mount Washington, Kentucky, the daughter of a dog groomer mother and truck tire salesman father. She hails from an extended family of Louisville farmers, having helped her grandfather on his tobacco farm from the age of six. At the age of 12, she began acting at the Actors Theatre of Louisville. She decided not to pursue dancing as a career, instead focusing on acting. Reflecting on this decision in the book The World of Critical Role, she said, "I knew it wasn't the lifestyle that I wanted, because that dancer lifestyle is brutal. Getting into a studio or a company is near impossible, and then you're just destroying your body. So I knew that I wasn't up for that, but I'd really fallen in love with acting." She received an offer of representation from an agent in Los Angeles in the summer of 2008, and moved there at the age of 19. Her parents supported the decision and drove her there.

Ray arrived in Los Angeles during the Writers Guild strike, causing her difficulty in finding auditions and leading her to support herself financially by canvassing for that year's presidential election. After the election, she took up street performing as a tap dancer on Hollywood Boulevard. On the advice of a nearby Batman performer, she switched to wearing a Poison Ivy costume and charging for photos, but had difficulty with members of the public not recognising the character; when a little girl mistook her for Tinker Bell, she realized that Disneytoon Studios' Tinker Bell film series was currently in production, and switched to dressing as Tinker Bell for the next three years. She joined an improv club, where a friend provided her with the connection she needed to get involved in producing web media.

== Career ==
=== Early web series ===
Ray produced a Batgirl fan series called Batgirl: Spoiled (2012), in which she played the title character. Ray's future husband Matthew Mercer assisted on the project, which also featured Taliesin Jaffe as The Riddler. Ray later described the series as her big break, as it drew a large audience due to the lack of Batgirl media at the time. She also hosted the web series Super Power Beat Down which began that year with a race between two incarnations of the Batmobile. She continued to host it until 2016.

She joined Mercer's home Dungeons & Dragons campaign in 2012 as Keyleth, a half-elf druid. In 2015, the campaign began to air on Geek & Sundry as the web series Critical Role. Her character for the second campaign was Beauregard, a human monk. Geek & Sundry hosted the show until it went independent in 2019, part way through the second campaign. Ray was involved in many of Geek & Sundry's other productions during the period, including co-hosting Key Questions, acting in Sagas of Sundry, and producing Signal Boost! She announced her appointment to the post of creative director for Geek & Sundry on July 28, 2017; and her tenure saw the company reach its Twitch subscription peak in January 2018. She stepped down from the position that June, when Critical Role began preparations to become independent. Critical Role was both the Webby Winner and the People's Voice Winner in the "Games (Video Series & Channels)" category at the 2019 Webby Awards; the show was also both a Finalist and the Audience Honor Winner at the 2019 Shorty Awards.

=== Critical Role Productions ===
After becoming hugely successful, the Critical Role cast left the Geek & Sundry network in early 2019 and set up their own company called Critical Role Productions. Ray became the creative director for the company. In February 2019, Critical Role began to air on its own channel and was no longer broadcast by Geek & Sundry. Soon after, Critical Role Productions aimed to raise $750,000 on Kickstarter to create an animated series of their first campaign, but ended up raising over $11 million. In November 2019, Amazon Prime Video announced that they had acquired the streaming rights to this animated series, now titled The Legend of Vox Machina; Ray reprised her role as Keyleth. Ahead of the series premiere in January 2022, Amazon renewed the series for a second season which premiered in January 2023. On October 6, 2022, Amazon renewed the series for a third season. The third campaign of the web series began airing in 2021, with Ray as the multiclassed warlock/sorcerer Laudna.

Madison Durham, for Polygon in February 2022, commented that "Ray has been instrumental in making Critical Role into the sprawling multimedia company that it is today, contributing as the creative lead for shows like All Work No Play, Exandria Unlimited, and more. In interviews and media appearances, the persona she presents behind the scenes is distinctly different from Keyleth's brand of awkward deference. Ray appears to command the room, regularly making difficult decisions that impact the entire organization".

A Familiar Problem, a one-page RPG co-written by Ray and Grant Howitt, was released in June 2022; it was published by the Critical Role Productions imprint Darrington Press. Also in June 2022, Critical Role Productions launched a new record label, Scanlan Shorthalt Music, to release original music inspired by Critical Role and the Exandria setting. Along with the label announcement, they released their first album titled Welcome to Tal'Dorei. The new project is led by Ray and Senior Producer Maxwell James. In November 2022, the label released a second album titled Welcome to Wildemount.

== Personal life ==
Ray began dating fellow voice actor and Critical Role co-star Matthew Mercer in 2011. They were engaged in 2016 and married on October 21, 2017. They reside in Los Angeles with their pet corgi, Omar.

Ray participated in the charity boxing event Creator Clash 2 on April 15, 2023, losing to Haley Sharpe by unanimous decision.

== Boxing record ==
1 fight	0 wins	1 loss
By decision	0	1

No.	Result	Record	Opponent	Type	Round, time	Date	Location	Notes
1	Loss	0–1	Haley Sharpe	UD	5	April 15, 2023	Amalie Arena, Tampa, Florida, U.S.	

== Filmography ==
Key
†	Denotes television productions that have not yet been released

=== Voice-over filmography ===
List of voice-over performances
Year	Title	Role(s)	Notes	Source
2014	Persona 4 Arena Ultimax	Margaret		
2014	Persona Q: Shadow of the Labyrinth	Margaret		
2015	Lego Dimensions	Amy Allen		
2015	Metal Gear Solid V: The Phantom Pain	Diamond Dog Soldier		
2015	Persona 4: Dancing All Night	Margaret		
2015	Star Wars Battlefront	Stormtrooper Female		
2015	The Legend of Heroes: Trails of Cold Steel	Laura S. Arseid		
2016	The Legend of Heroes: Trails of Cold Steel II	Laura S. Arseid		
2016	Fire Emblem Fates	Mikoto, Effie, Oboro		
2016	Lego Marvel's Avengers	S.H.I.E.L.D. Scientist		
2017	Fire Emblem Heroes	Shanna, Oboro, Effie		
2017	Fire Emblem Warriors			
2017	Friday the 13th: The Game	AJ Mason		
2017	Final Fantasy XV: Comrades	Jeanne Labreigh		
2018	Metal Gear Survive	Player, Miranda		
2018	Pillars of Eternity II: Deadfire	Maia Rua, Keyleth	Keyleth via Critical Role Pack DLC	
2019	The Legend of Heroes: Trails of Cold Steel III	Laura S. Arseid		
2019	Far Cry New Dawn	Voice Talents		
2020	Fallout 76: Wastelanders	Eugenie		
2020	The Last of Us Part II	WLF Soldier		
2022–present	The Legend of Vox Machina	Keyleth, Laudna, Kraken	Animated series; executive producer and writer	
2025	Date Everything!	Beverly		
2025	Dispatch	Brickhouse		
2025	Tomb Raider: The Legend of Lara Croft	Fig, Dr. Doomsickle	Animated series	
2025–present	The Mighty Nein	Beauregard "Beau" Lionett	Animated series; executive producer	
2027	Persona 4 Revival †	Margaret		
2027	Final Fantasy VII Revelation †	Polydroid Shiva		

=== Live-action filmography ===
List of live-action performances
Year	Title	Role(s)	Notes	Source
2010–11	1000 Ways to Die	Tina the Video Gamer, Trudie the Karaoke Girl	Television series Episodes: "Stupid Is As Death Does" and "Death On A Stick"	
2012	Batgirl: Spoiled	Stephanie Brown	Fan-made web series	
2012–16	Super Power Beat Down	Herself	Web series	
2013	School of Thrones	Melisandre	Parody web series	
2013	Walk of Shame	Anne	Television series	
2013	Chastity Bites	Flashback Virgin 5	Film	
2015–present	Critical Role	Keyleth of the Air Ashari (Campaign 1)	Cast member Creator-owned actual play web series	
2015–present	Critical Role	Beauregard "Beau" Lionett (Campaign 2)	Cast member Creator-owned actual play web series	
2015–present	Critical Role	Laudna (Campaign 3)	Cast member Creator-owned actual play web series	
2015–present	Critical Role	Murray Mag'Nesson (Campaign 4)	Cast member Creator-owned actual play web series	
2016–21	Talks Machina	Herself	Web talk show	
2017	Sagas of Sundry: Madness	Abigail Persimmon	Actual play web series	
2018	Key Question	Herself; co-host	Web series	
2018–21	L.A. by Night	Ellenore	Actual play web series Episodes: "Find My Home" and "Live on the Moon"	
2019	Pub Draw	Herself	Web series	
2019	UnDeadwood	Arabella Whitlock	Web limited series	
2020	Dimension 20: Pirates of Leviathan	Sunny Biscotto	Actual play web anthology series	
2022	Exandria Unlimited: Calamity	Patia Por'co	Actual play web anthology series	
2022–24	4-Sided Dive	Herself	Web talk show	
2023	Candela Obscura	Beatrix Monroe	Actual play web series using the Illuminated Worlds system; 3 episodes	
2024	Moonward	Vesta Sterling	Web limited series	
2025	Age of Umbra	Brixton	Actual play limited series using the Daggerheart system	
2026	Shattered Legends	Florence	Actual play limited series using the Daggerheart system	

=== Audio books ===
List of voice-over performances in Audio books
Year	Title	Role(s)	Notes	Source
2022	Critical Role: The Mighty Nein – The Nine Eyes of Lucien	Beauregard "Beau" Lionett		
2024	Critical Role: Bells Hells – What Doesn't Break	Laudna		
2025	Critical Role: Vox Machina – Stories Untold	Narrator		
2026	Critical Role: The Mighty Nein – Stories Untold	Narrator		
