= Midst =

Science fiction podcast

- Genre: Space Western; Science fiction podcast
- Language: English

Creative team
- Created by: Third Person

Cast and voices
- Starring: Third Person

Production
- Production: Third Person Productions (2020–22); Metapigeon (2023–24)
- Length: 15–45 minutes

Publication
- No. of seasons: 3
- No. of episodes: 57
- Original release: January 7, 2020 – June 26, 2024
- Provider: Critical Role Productions (2023)
- Updates: Weekly

Related
- Website: midst.co

Midst is a space western audio drama podcast created and narrated by an anonymous trio of artists known as Third Person. The first season aired from January 7, 2020, to May 1, 2020. The second season aired from July 30, 2021, to April 29, 2022. In March 2023, Midst was acquired by Metapigeon which rereleased the remastered series weekly beginning on April 11, 2023, on various podcasting platforms and the Critical Role YouTube channel. Metapigeon also ordered a final third season of the show which aired from February 14, 2024, to June 26, 2024.

A limited series spin-off, titled Moonward, set after the events of Midst aired in August 2024. A sequel audio drama, titled Unend, set several decades after Midst and Moonward premiered in October 2024 with a second season premiering in June 2025.

== Premise ==
Midst is a semi-improvised space-western audio drama focused on "three protagonists – a crotchety outlaw, a struggling cultist and a diabolical bastard – as their paths intersect in unexpected ways" in the town of Stationary Hill after the mysterious civilization known as the Trust becomes interested in the islet of Midst where the town is located.

== History ==
Midst was originally produced by the studio Third Person which was made of the podcast's three anonymous narrators and was inspired by a campaign setting the narrators created for a tabletop role-playing game they played together. It was originally released from January 2020 to April 2022.

In March 2023, the science fiction podcast was purchased by Metapigeon, the film and television production banner of Critical Role Productions; this is the first time that Critical Role has acquired outside intellectual property. Critical Role began to rerelease Midst in April 2023. This rerelease includes remastered audio, a new video format and a planned new third season. It also has an ad-free subscription option that includes an early release schedule and other bonus content.

When asked in an interview on how the production changed after acquisition, Third Person narrator Xen opined that the upcoming third season will be "on another level" as it will be the first season the group works on full time as opposed to the first two seasons where they were "hobbyist producers" with limited time. Narrator Matt also highlighted the transition of working on the podcast during the group's hobby time versus now working on it full time. Narrator Sara highlighted the art of the new YouTube edition:

Midst is an audio drama, but even when we were indie, we were very gung-ho about making it "more than just a podcast" – creating as many supplements as we could, the appendices, character portraits, episode icons, etc. So having the opportunity to visualize our world through the styles of so many different artists has been a dream come true.

In January 2024, Critical Role announced that while the upcoming third season would be the final season for the podcast, the partnership with Third Person would continue with future projects. In July 2024, as part of the announcement of the Moonward spin-off, Third Person revealed that the anonymous narrators are Matt Roen, Sara Wile, and Xen.

== Broadcast ==
The nineteen episode first season ran from January 7, 2020, to May 1, 2020, and the nineteen episode second season ran from July 30, 2021, to April 29, 2022. In March 2023, all episodes were removed from various podcast platforms.

On April 11, 2023, Critical Role released the first remastered episode and then released two more episodes that week. Following the initial three episode release, the remastered episodes for the first season were posted weekly on "every subsequent Wednesday". The remastered episodes are available on various podcasting platforms and the Critical Role YouTube channel; subscribers have access to an ad-free early release version. The remastered second season premiered on August 23, 2023 with subsequent episodes released weekly on Wednesdays.

The nineteen episode third season premiered on February 14, 2024 with subsequent episodes released weekly on Wednesdays. The final episode was released on June 26, 2024.

== Episodes ==
=== Series overview ===
Season	Episodes	Originally released	
Season	Episodes	First released	Last released
1	19	January 7, 2020	May 1, 2020
2	19	July 30, 2021	April 29, 2022
3	19	February 14, 2024	June 26, 2024

=== Season 1 (2020) ===
No. overall	No. in season	Title	Original release date	Remastered air date
1	1	"Unrise"	January 7, 2020	April 11, 2023
2	2	"Secrets"	January 9, 2020	April 12, 2023
3	3	"Mica"	January 9, 2020	April 13, 2023
4	4	"Fold"	January 17, 2020	April 19, 2023
5	5	"Missions"	January 24, 2020	April 26, 2023
6	6	"Zero"	January 31, 2020	May 3, 2023
7	7	"Scry"	February 7, 2020	May 10, 2023
8	8	"Gala"	February 14, 2020	May 17, 2023
9	9	"Convert"	February 21, 2020	May 24, 2023
10	10	"Trust"	February 28, 2020	May 31, 2023
11	11	"Descent"	March 6, 2020	June 7, 2023
12	12	"Coda"	March 13, 2020	June 14, 2023
13	13	"Loose End"	March 20, 2020	June 21, 2023
14	14	"Remains"	March 27, 2020	June 28, 2023
15	15	"Accounting"	April 3, 2020	July 5, 2023
16	16	"Garage Sale"	April 10, 2020	July 12, 2023
17	17	"Convergence"	April 17, 2020	July 19, 2023
18	18	"A Good Man"	April 24, 2020	July 26, 2023
19	19	"Moonfall"	May 1, 2020	August 2, 2023

=== Season 2 (2021–2022) ===
No. overall	No. in season	Title	Original release date	Remastered air date
20	1	"Shelter"	July 30, 2021	August 23, 2023
21	2	"Ascendancy"	August 13, 2021	August 30, 2023
22	3	"Stalemate"	August 27, 2021	September 6, 2023
23	4	"Weather"	September 10, 2021	September 13, 2023
24	5	"Sugarcoat"	September 24, 2021	September 20, 2023
25	6	"Tinderbox"	October 8, 2021	September 27, 2023
26	7	"Security"	October 22, 2021	October 4, 2023
27	8	"Wake"	November 5, 2021	October 11, 2023
28	9	"Crossroads"	November 19, 2021	October 18, 2023
29	10	"Oversight"	December 3, 2021	October 25, 2023
30	11	"Buddies"	December 17, 2021	November 1, 2023
31	12	"Lazaretto"	December 31, 2021	November 8, 2023
32	13	"Inside"	February 4, 2022	November 15, 2023
33	14	"Imago"	February 18, 2022	November 29, 2023
34	15	"Truth"	March 4, 2022	December 6, 2023
35	16	"Blood Ties"	March 18, 2022	December 13, 2023
36	17	"Compensation"	April 3, 2022	January 3, 2024
37	18	"Boss"	April 15, 2022	January 10, 2024
38	19	"Exposed"	April 29, 2022	January 17, 2024

=== Season 3 (2024) ===
No. overall	No. in season	Title	Original release date
39	1	"Imbalance"	February 14, 2024
40	2	"Breakfast"	February 21, 2024
41	3	"Change"	February 28, 2024
42	4	"Foundation"	March 6, 2024
43	5	"Acculturation"	March 13, 2024
44	6	"Switcheroo"	March 20, 2024
45	7	"Tempest"	March 27, 2024
46	8	"Fault"	April 3, 2024
47	9	"Baron"	April 10, 2024
48	10	"Bedrock"	April 17, 2024
49	11	"Resolve"	April 24, 2024
50	12	"Interest"	May 1, 2024
51	13	"Machinations"	May 8, 2024
52	14	"Shindig"	May 15, 2024
53	15	"Breach"	May 22, 2024
54	16	"Trustfall"	May 29, 2024
55	17	"Ghosts"	June 5, 2024
56	18	"Home"	June 12, 2024
57	19	"Balance"	June 26, 2024

== Reception ==
Rashika Rao, for International Podcast Month in 2020, stated that the style of Midst is "reminiscent of Gravity Falls" and that the podcast "combines the unapologetically weird with the frighteningly real to create one of the most original fictional worlds out there right now. Do yourself a favor and speedrun season one—you won't regret it". She also highlighted the world's Valor system which is based on a "person's inherent goodness" with inheritable debt resulting in many people spending "their entire lives trying to rack up enough good deeds to end up at a balanced zero". Rao commented that the Valor system heavily impacts the narrative along with the motivations of various characters and becomes "a brilliant criticism of capitalism because of how closely it aligns to reality".

Midst was included as an "interesting pick" on Vulture's "The Best Podcasts of 2022, According to People Who Make Podcasts" list – the article stated that the podcast is "a consistent entry among producers who either work in the genre or pay close attention to it". Lauren Shippen highlighted that it has a "rich and full sound design" with a spin on the "concept of an exclusively narrated podcast"; "a lot of podcasts throw around words like immersive, but Midst actually delivers – you feel like you're inside the world the narrators are building for you".

Caitlyn Ng Man Chuen, for CBR in 2023, called Midst "creative and original" with a "world that listeners just can't get enough of". She highlighted that the setting mixes "elements of science fiction, fantasy, and drama" – "beyond this, it also has interesting elements related to the world's political system and economy, which adds a lot of political intrigue to the show". Chuen stated that the podcast "is an excellent display of interactive and creative storytelling that's rare to see done with such professionalism. The story has everything from murder mysteries and brainwashing cults to magic and love, all in a distinct world with interesting characters".

=== Accolades ===
Year	Award	Category	Result	Ref
2021	New Jersey WebFest	Best Editing of a Narrative Fiction (Fiction Podcast)	Won	
2021	New Jersey WebFest	Outstanding Science Fiction (Fiction Podcast)	Won	
2021	New Jersey WebFest	Best of the Best (Fiction Podcast)	Won	
2022	New Jersey WebFest	Outstanding Science Fiction (Narrative Fiction Podcast)	Won	
2022	Minnesota WebFest	Best Science Fiction Podcast	Nominated	
2022	Minnesota WebFest	Best Overall Podcast	Nominated	
2025	Webby Awards	Podcasts (Features) – Experimental & Innovation	Nominated	

== Spin-offs ==
=== Comics ===
In April 2024, a new comic limited series published by Dark Horse was announced. The series will consist of three oversize issues each following a new story and with its own creative team. The first issue, titled Midst: Address Unknown, was released in August 2024 and was written by Colin Lorimer with art by Alejandro Aragón, colors by Chris O'Halloran, and letters by Jim Campbell. It follows new characters after their postal ship crashes on Midst.

=== Related shows ===
Moonward, a four-part limited series set after Midst, was announced in July 2024. It features Xen as the guide narrator with Liam O'Brien, Marisha Ray, Roen and Wile as players. Cheryl Teh of Business Insider highlighted that Moonward features "just pure roleplay and acting" as "there no dice and no rules in" the series. The series aired from August 7 to August 28, 2024 with early access for Beacon and Midst subscribers. Tara McCauley, in a review for The Escapist, commented that Moonward "proves undoubtedly engaging" for those who are "in search of character focused storytelling". She noted that while the show "lacks the mechanical perquisites of actual play", Moonward "still deals heavily in the genre's broader motifs, such as creative group problem solving and character-based decision-making" and that this style of storytelling shows the "improvisational method" that was behind Midst. McCauley also highlighted that Moonward, at roughly two hours per episode, has much shorter episodes than Critical Role and that show's the staging is more similar to what is seen in Candela Obscura, however, it "ups the theatrical ante" and "flits between shots of individual players, sides of the table, and the occasional split-screen" between scene partners.

Unend is an audio drama set several decades after Midst and Moonward by Third Person. The cast consists of Xen, Roen, and Wile. It premiered on October 9, 2024 with new episodes airing weekly on Wednesdays. Beacon and Midst subscribers have access to an early release schedule. The second season premiered on June 4, 2025, with its finale on October 15, 2025. The third and final season is scheduled to premiere on April 8, 2026.
