= Critical Role campaign four =

- Starring: Laura Bailey; Robbie Daymond; Matthew Mercer; Travis Willingham; Ashley Johnson; Alexander Ward; Taliesin Jaffe; Aabria Iyengar; Marisha Ray; Luis Carazo; Sam Riegel; Whitney Moore; Liam O'Brien; Brennan Lee Mulligan
- No. of episodes: 43

Release
- Original network: Beacon; Twitch; YouTube
- Original release: October 2, 2025 – present

Season chronology
- ← Previous; Campaign three

The fourth campaign of the Dungeons & Dragons web series Critical Role premiered on October 2, 2025. Brennan Lee Mulligan replaced Matthew Mercer as Dungeon Master, while Mercer switched to a player role. Rather than Exandria, the setting used in the previous three campaigns, the campaign is set in Mulligan's new world of Aramán. The characters' intertwined stories explore a fractured world shaped by the death of gods and the aftermath of rebellion.

With the cast expanding to thirteen players, the actual play campaign features multiple tables with the game in a West Marches format. After a four-episode 'overture' with the full cast, the players divided into three initial groups: the Soldiers, the Seekers, and the Schemers. Following the Convergence arc, the players were largely divided across two main groups: the Seekers and the Schemers.

Campaign four airs each Thursday at 7 p.m. PT on Critical Role Productions' Twitch and YouTube channels and the Beacon streaming service except for occasional hiatuses. The show went on a summer hiatus following the end of the Convergence arc in June 2026; it returned on August 27, 2026.

== Cast ==
=== Main ===
- Brennan Lee Mulligan as the Dungeon Master

Following the fourth episode, the player cast was divided into three initial groups called Soldiers, Seekers, and Schemers. In Episode 31 "Trick of the Light", as part of the Convergence arc, the groups were rearranged with the players mostly divided between Seekers and Schemers and leaving one player in Soldiers. Players are listed under their initial group.

==== The Soldiers ====
- Laura Bailey as Thimble, a four-inch-tall pixie rogue, from the land of Faerie. Thimble was the closest companion of rebel leader Thjazi Fang. Thimble joined the Seekers table following the Convergence arc.
- Robbie Daymond as Kattigan "Kat" Vale, a human ranger (Note: In some materials, the production refers to several traditional Dungeons & Dragons character classes with alternative Critical Role class names: tracker for ranger, exemplar for paladin, prodigy mage for sorcerer, pact magus for warlock, arcanist for wizard, and wild mage for druid.) with a wolf companion named Wulferic. He previously fought alongside Thjazi, Teor, and Azune in the Falconer's Rebellion. Kattigan joined the Seekers table following the Convergence arc.
- Travis Willingham as Teor Pridesire, a lionfolk paladin who fought alongside Kattigan, Thjazi, and Azune during the Falconer's Rebellion. Teor died during the Convergence arc in Obrimus Manor on an infiltration mission to rescue Mara the Wing from House Tachonis.
- Sam Riegel as Wicander "Wick" Halovar, a human sorcerer from the noble Sundered House of Halovar and a Light Priest of the Candescent Creed, a new religion espoused by his house. He later discovers that, due to his grandfather being an angel, he is an aasimar. Wicander joined the Schemers table following the Convergence arc.
- Whitney Moore as Tyranny, a demon warlock who recently arrived on the mortal plane. She is an Aspirant in the Candescent Creed, serving under Wick and also acts as his bodyguard. Tyranny joined the Schemers table following the Convergence arc.

==== The Seekers ====
- Matthew Mercer as Sir Julien Davinos, a human fighter/rogue from House Davinos, a vassal to the noble Sundered House of Royce. He is childhood friends with Thjazi's widow, Lady Aranessa Royce, but hates Thjazi and was the one who captured him. Julien remained with the Seekers table following the Convergence arc.
- Ashley Johnson as Vaelus, an elven paladin from the Mournvale and one of the Sisters of Sylandri, followers of the dead god of life and elves. She wants to reclaim an artifact known as the Stone of Nightsong, which was stolen by Thjazi. Vaelus remained with the Seekers table following the Convergence arc. Due to destroying the Stone of Nightsong, Vaelus is forsaken by her patron and stripped of her powers, leading her to train with Julien to become a Fighter instead.
- Alexander Ward as Occtis Tachonis, a young human necromancer wizard from the noble Sundered House of Tachonis. He has an animal companion named Pincushion, an undead fox made of parts from multiple foxes. After Occtis is murdered by his family, he returns as a Hollow One. (Note: A Hollow One is a type of revenant from the sourcebook Explorer's Guide to Wildemount (2020) which introduced game mechanics for "those who were resurrected through strange necromantic magic".) Occtis remained with the Seekers table following the Convergence arc.
- Aabria Iyengar as Thaisha Lloy, an orc druid who follows the Old Path of rituals and magic separate from the gods. She is from House Lloy, a smithing house of importance in Dol-Makjar, and shares children with Halandil Fang. Following the Convergence arc, Thaisha became the only member of the Soldiers table. The character's solo mission coincided with Iyengar's maternity leave.

==== The Schemers ====
- Taliesin Jaffe as Bolaire Lathalia, a warlock and curator of the Archanade, a museum of arcane artifacts. He appears to be wearing a grey mask that moves as if it were a living face; however, he is actually a sentient magic item created during The Shapers' War by the halflings to kill the trickster goddess Rauwyn. When worn, Bolaire takes control of the wearer's body. Bolaire fled to Dol-Makjar during the Falconer's Rebellion; he later befriended Hal but his secret was discovered by Thjazi, who blackmailed him over his true nature. Bolaire joined the Seekers table following the Convergence arc.
- Marisha Ray as Murray Mag'Nesson, a dwarven diviner wizard who is a bursar at the Penteveral, an arcane college. She was friends with Thjazi. Murray remained with the Schemers table following the Convergence arc.
- Luis Carazo as Azune Nayar, a human paladin/sorcerer. Azune is an Arcane Marshal in the Revolutionary Guard of Dol-Makjar. During the Falconer's Rebellion, he fought alongside Kattigan, Thjazi, and Teor. Azune remained with the Schemers table following the Convergence arc.
- Liam O'Brien as Halandil "Hal" Fang, an orc bard who resides in Dol-Makjar and was granted the neighborhood's theater by the city's ruling council. He is the half-brother of Thjazi, and has multiple children, some with Thaisha. Halandil remained with the Schemers table following the Convergence arc.

== Production and format ==
=== Casting ===
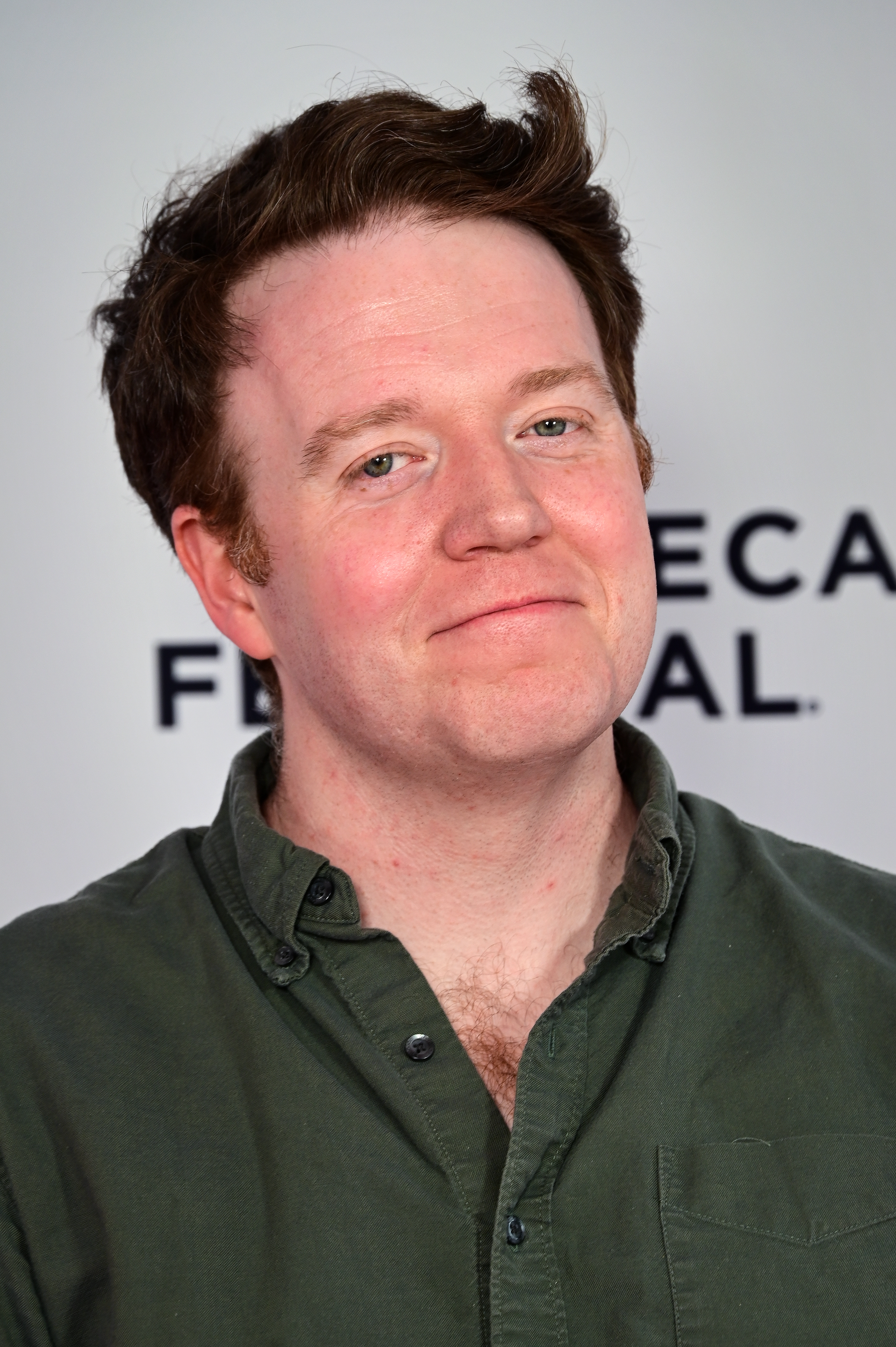
Brennan Lee Mulligan, the series' new Dungeon Master

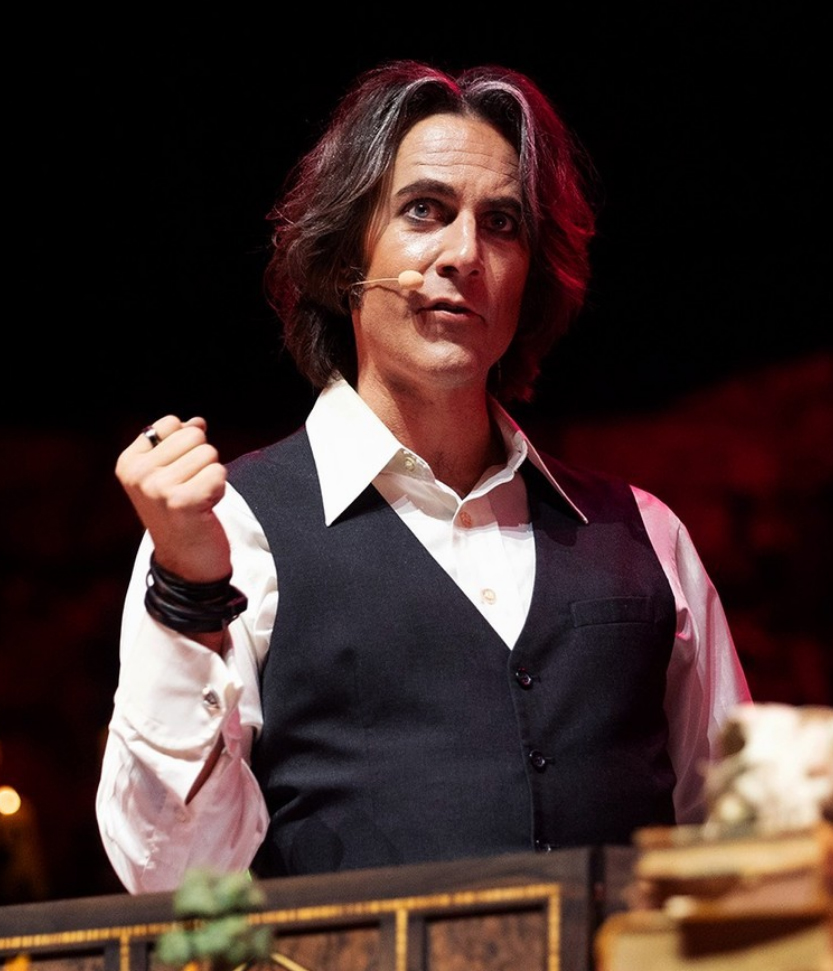
Matthew Mercer, Dungeon Master of campaigns 1‒3

The casting of Brennan Lee Mulligan as the Game Master for campaign four was announced during the August 2, 2025 live show in Indiana and a press release from the studio, Critical Role Productions. Matthew Mercer was the Dungeon Master for the first three campaigns; however, for the fourth campaign, Mercer appears in a player-role. Rolling Stone stated that "the inclusion of Mulligan is huge, but not entirely surprising" given Mulligan's background as "a well-established Game Master" who created the "titanic success" Dimension 20 along with previous comments made by Mercer on eventually shifting "into a 'Professor X' role as a mentor to the next generation of storytellers rather than remaining the face of the brand in perpetuity". Later that month, Critical Role announced an expanded player cast – in addition to the original Critical Role cast returning as players, Luis Carazo, Robbie Daymond, Aabria Iyengar, Whitney Moore and Alexander Ward joined the main cast for the fourth campaign.

=== Game system and production design ===
Critical Role is an actual play which uses a tabletop role-playing game system. Cheryl Teh of Business Insider noted that the initial announcement of the fourth campaign did not reveal which game system the campaign will use and further highlighted that Critical Role's tabletop game imprint Darrington Press had just released their own tabletop role-playing game, Daggerheart. Then in an August 21, 2025 press release, Critical Role released the cast and campaign structure for the fourth campaign which included the announcement that the campaign would be using the 2024 revision to the 5th Edition ruleset of Dungeons & Dragons. The campaign features homebrew design contributions by Jeremy Crawford and Chris Perkins. Mulligan has also introduced additional house rules that come into play when a player character is at 50% or less hit points (HP), when they are rolling death saves and after the players reach a level-up milestone; at that point, they can increase their level during gameplay "in a narratively satisfying moment for their characters to acquire more power and health, including in the middle of combat".

After the opening four overture sessions of the campaign, Mulligan split the players into three initial groups: the Soldiers, the Seekers, and the Schemers. The campaign then continues in a West Marches-style structure, where the actions of one group of players can impact the shared narrative—potentially having implications for the other groups. On the use of the West Marches-style, Mulligan noted that while it is not a frequent actual play format, the "idea of a massive world explored by a party that splits to cover more ground and then reconverges is baked into the DNA of the fantasy genre" and is seen in "foundational texts of high fantasy" such as Game of Thrones and The Two Towers. In the third episode, it was revealed that Travis Willingham, Laura Bailey, Whitney Moore, Sam Riegel, and Robbie Daymond are part of the Soldiers group. Following the fourth episode, it was revealed that Aabria Iyengar, Ashley Johnson, Mercer, and Alexander Ward are part of the Seekers group while Luis Carazo, Taliesin Jaffe, Liam O'Brien, and Marisha Ray are part of the Schemers group.

Mulligan and Ray, who is also the creative director of Critical Role Productions, explained that there is pre-planning to include episode cold opens as well as aiming for a specific number of episodes per table. However, they also stated that they are prioritizing the story so episode count will increase or decrease based on when the narrative "venture feels concluded". Mulligan commented that they are not "living and dying by 'we need to deliver that plot point by this episode, because then we're outta here.' I mean, hey, we had our four-episode overture, but by the end of it, we still hadn't split up the Schemers and Seekers tables, so we just did that in episode five". Following the overture, the first narrative arc focused on the Soldiers group, the second arc focused on the Seekers group, and the third arc focused on the Schemers group. The fourth arc, referred to as the Convergence episodes, featured the three groups reuniting at one table. Following this arc, the Seekers group is composed of Bailey, Daymond, Mercer, Johnson, Ward, and Jaffe; the Schemers group is composed of Riegel, Moore, Ray, Carazo and O'Brien; Iyengar is only member of the Soldiers group.

=== Broadcast ===
The fourth campaign premiered on October 2, 2025. It will then air weekly each Thursday at 7 p.m. PT. It will be broadcast on Critical Role's Twitch and YouTube channels as well as on the studio's streaming service Beacon. The public VOD will be available the Monday after each episode "and podcast episodes will drop in two parts: the first one the week after the premiere, and the second on the following Tuesday". Campaign three of Critical Role did not air new episodes on the last Thursday of every month. In March 2026, Critical Role announced that this schedule would not continue for the fourth campaign; instead of a set monthly break, pauses would occur due to natural story progression or United States holidays. The show went on hiatus while Age of Umbra: Sallowlands aired in its timeslot from July 9 to August 13, 2026. The show returned on August 27, 2026.

Additionally, an immediate aftershow with the table cast – Critical Role Cooldown – airs exclusively on Beacon after the release of each episode. Tale Gate is a live talk-back show, hosted by Whitney Moore, for the fourth campaign. The cast answers fan questions submitted on Beacon's Discord channel. It premiered on January 20, 2026 on Beacon, YouTube and Twitch; it also features a "Night Cap" segment exclusive to Beacon.

== Setting ==
The fourth campaign steps away from Mercer's Exandria – the world setting used in the first three campaigns and the Exandria Unlimited anthology web series. In August 2025, the name of the new world was teased through an augmented reality game (ARG). Aramán was then confirmed as the name of the new setting on August 21. Mulligan, the new setting's creator, described it as a "love letter to Exandria". Following the release of the campaign's first episode, Mulligan explained that rather than doing a monologue establishing the lore of Aramán, he took inspiration from the start of The Wire (2002), one of his favorite television shows. Mulligan commented that on "the first watch-through of [The Wire], you're watching the first four episodes and you're like, 'Huh?! What?! What?!' And then you're like, 'This is fucking awesome".

Seventy years before the start of the campaign, the people of Aramán killed the world's gods in a conflict called the Shapers' War. Mulligan noted that this revolution occurred due to the orcs rising "up against their oppressor", the god of war and suffering, which led to a wider war between the gods and mortals. He explained that the gods of Aramán decide to aid their fellow god against the orcs, prompting dwarves, elves, and humans to question why they should "save the god of war and suffering". Mulligan framed the conflict as "a story of class solidarity", in which the gods "would rather protect one of their own than save their followers". While the war ended with the gods defeated, Mulligan highlighted that although this leaves mortals "at the helm of their own destiny", they are still faced with challenges even without the divine. During the Shapers' War, two noble priestly houses – House Halovar and House Tachonis – sided with the gods while three other noble houses – House Royce, House Einfasen, and House Cormoray – rebelled. Collectively, these nobles became known as the Sundered Houses due to the losses they sustained during the Shapers' War; however, they continued to wield significant political and social influence afterward. At the campaign's outset, the land of Aramán is still dealing with the long-term consequences of the war with the gods and the Falconer's Rebellion, a secondary conflict between the Sundered Houses and the wider population that happened twelve years previously. It begins in the city of Dol-Makjar and initially focuses on the execution of Thjazi Fang, a hero of the Falconer's Rebellion, whose death brings together the player characters in a quest to unravel the conspiracy behind his execution.

== Episodes ==
=== 2025 ===
List of episodes in 2025
Episode	Title	Run time	Original release date	Notes
1	"The Fall of Thjazi Fang"	04:27:48	October 2, 2025	Full cast
The former companions of rebel leader and war hero Thjazi Fang gather in the city of Dol-Makjar to mourn his death when he is executed for sedition. They try to understand why their plans to free him failed at the last minute. Those returning to the city are disturbed to find that the political influence of the noble Sundered Houses has reshaped the city into something unrecognizable. When they discover that Thjazi's closest companion, the pixie Thimble, was attacked and the Stone of Nightsong – a relic that enables elvenkind to bypass the realms of the dead and enter their afterlife directly – was stolen from Thjazi's safe house, they realize that Thjazi's execution was part of a wider conspiracy. They suspect the involvement of the Crow Keepers thieves guild. The funeral is interrupted by Vaelus, a follower of one of the dead gods of Aramán. She accuses Thjazi of being a thief and demands that the Stone of Nightsong is returned to her.
2	"Broken Wing"	04:33:19	October 9, 2025	Full cast
Hal and Vaelus come to a truce as the investigation into Thjazi's death begins. Bolaire and Murray study a box acquired for Thjazi by Thaisha and learn that it is the coffin of a psychopomp of celestial origin. In the wake of the gods' deaths, all celestials went feral and had to be killed for the safety of mortals. Teor approaches House Halovar searching for information under the guise of seeking employment, but its matriarch Yanessa discerns his ulterior motives. Azune learns that the Sundered Houses have taken control over the Revolutionary Guard and the Penteveral, the arcane college. Julien is warned that House Tachonis is searching for Occtis because of his role in Thjazi's failed rescue and is instructed to bring him to House Royce before Tachonis find him. Thimble, Kat, and Occtis go to a tavern operated by the Crow Keepers to search for Casimir, a former Torn Banner mercenary, current member of the Crow Keepers, and missing participant in the rescue plan. Wick learns that House Halovar has been harvesting the blood of his celestial grandfather they have imprisoned to empower the Candescent Creed.
3	"The Snipping of Shears"	05:00:53	October 16, 2025	Full cast
Wick struggles with the knowledge that the Candescent Creed rests on a lie, while Tyranny confesses she always knew but was inspired by his genuine belief. They set out to rescue Teor, who has fallen into a Halovar trap. Tyranny warns that defying Wick's family will have consequences. Thimble, Kattigan and Occtis are drawn into a fight with the Crow Keepers, but are saved by Vaelus. Thimble realizes Casimir was part of the group that attacked her, betrayed the plan to save Thjazi, and sold the Stone of Nightsong. He also held a deed to a fortress in Gormoley, north in Timmony, before Teor's brother Cyd stole it. Regrouping at Hal's house, they realize that Dol-Makjar is too dangerous; Thimble, Kat, Teor, Tyranny, and Wick head north. Occtis is located by Julien who escorts him to Aranessa Royce, who asks Occtis about House Tachonis' castle in the realms of the dead. Having accompanied Occtis, Vaelus and Julien share a sense of a rising disturbance. Vaelus opens a gate into the Davinos estate for Thaisha to approach. However, assassins from House Tachonis attack, kill Julien's father and begin a ritual to implant the Stone of Nightsong into Occtis' body.
4	"Stone-Faced"	05:11:36	October 23, 2025	Seekers' and Schemers' cast
House Davinos falls during the Tachonis' attack. Occtis is murdered by his brother, with his heart replaced by the Stone of Nightsong. Thaisha, Julien, Vaelus and Aranessa recover his body and retreat to the Lloy estate. Meanwhile, Murray, Hal and Azune confront Bolaire over a letter from Thjazi suggesting that he is not trustworthy. Bolaire admits that Thjazi was blackmailing him into stealing artifacts from the museum. He reveals that he is not a man in a mask, but rather he is the mask itself worn by a host and originally created as part of the plan to kill the god of trickery during the Shapers' War. They are interrupted by an emissary from House Cormoray. From the museum, they see the Davinos estate go dark. They investigate and discover the palazzo is deserted with no bodies; the trail then leads them to the Lloy estate. Bolaire and Murray work together to remove the Stone of Nightsong from Occtis' body which revives him as a revenant. Occtis is haunted by his experience in the realm of the dead as he saw visions of the Tachonis' undead army waging war in the afterlife.
5	"Branching Paths"	03:44:15	November 6, 2025	Full cast
The party debate what to do in light of Occtis' resurrection. At Aranessa's urging, Occtis, Julien, Thaisha and Vaelus head east to investigate Occtis' visions of a distant battlefield and to assess what remains of House Royce. Hal, Murray, Bolaire and Azune remain in Dol-Makjar, where they plan to drive a wedge between the Sundered Houses in the hopes of breaking their stranglehold on the city. Meanwhile, Teor, Thimble, Kat, Wick and Tyranny continue north toward Timmony in search of Cyd and Casimir. They also discover that Casimir is working with House Tachonis. They rest with a gnomish meteorologist, who studies a storm raging since the Shapers' War that has recently become more intense. Teor learns the man is still waiting for his daughters to return from the Falconer's Rebellion, and he promises to tell them to visit their father if he meets them.
6	"Knives and Thorns"	04:39:18	November 13, 2025	Soldiers' cast (cold open: Johnson and Ward)
Teor, Thimble, Kat, Tyranny and Wick continue the search for Cyd. Tyranny steals the gnome's most prized possession, a knife, and admits to the group that she is fighting her demonic nature; Kat returns the handle to the gnome. As they continue north, they encounter Hawthorn's Glade, a grove for fae creatures protected by the spirit of a hawthorn tree. The creatures are initially hostile until Wick's faith in the Candescent Creed manifests in a burst of light that the creatures believe to be a miracle. They are welcomed into the grove and learn that Cyd had passed through two days previously. The spirit of the tree admits that it misdirected Cyd, sending him to the Wraithtree, a tree that summons the undead into the mortal realm, in the hope that his death would help protect the grove as the undead prevent the grove from being discovered. The party race to save Cyd, killing a wraith and destroying the tree to cut off the connection to the realm of the dead, but they find no sign of Cyd.
7	"On the Scent"	04:05:59	November 20, 2025	Soldiers' cast (cold open: Jaffe and Ray)
The Soldiers enter the southern reaches of Timmony, where they find that the Candescent Creed is fomenting an insurrection against Augustus, the King of Timmony. A conversation with a shepherd reveals that Cyd survived the forest, was captured by his pursuers and that he is being taken to Castle Sloak. They realize that Casimir's deed is to the castle and that he is now the Baron of Sloak. They stop at an inn where Kattigan meets Morgaine, a hound in service of King Augustus and who is trying to learn more about Casimir. Thimble spies on the inn's residents and determines that they are vassals to House Tachonis, prompting the party to push on to Sloak. There they witness the Tachonis emissaries – Occtis's cousins, Lord Doset and his sister, Univere – returning the deed to Casimir and realize that Cyd was being held at the inn. They decide to remain in Sloak to exact revenge upon Casimir and to try and find out more about Tachonis' plans for Timmony. Wick and Tyranny pose as healers to infiltrate the castle, but find that Casimir's anger, exhaustion and hatred have driven him to the point of madness.
8	"Fanged Revenge"	04:29:30	December 4, 2025	Soldiers' cast (cold open: Iyengar and Mercer)
Wick and Tyranny try to isolate Casimir as Teor, Thimble and Kat get into position. The party attack Casimir and the Crow Keepers, but avoid fighting the knights in Casimir's service. Wick is critically injured in the fight and Tyranny tries to stabilise him while Thimble gives chase to Casimir. He lashes out at her, claiming that Thjazi made false promises about a better world that never came to be. Thimble slashes his throat. In the aftermath, Wick is named the new Baron of Sloak. He decides to spare the knights as they were not part of Casimir's plan, and he bequeaths Castle Sloak and its title to one of the knights upon learning that she is from the town. The party raise a new banner under the name of the Fanged Falcon, promising a new revolution. They find Morgaine and her partner Sir Hawkins in the town boarding house, who offer aid in their journey to find Cyd.
9	"To the Hounds!"	04:15:13	December 11, 2025	Soldiers' cast (cold open: Carazo and O'Brien)
While leading the group to Tybury's Lea, the seat of power in Gormalay, the hounds Morgaine and Hawkins reveal that House Tachonis have been raiding crypts across Timmony. Along the way, they meet a group of fairy bandits who pass on that House Royce has fallen. Upon arrival, Kat and Thimble witness the Candescent Creed's influence in the form of a hospital ministering to the sick as a plague sweeps through the region. They determine that Cyd is being held by House Tachonis in the Earl of Gormalay's castle, but Kat is disturbed by news that the Earl is bringing the body of his recently deceased wife to the hospital. The party witness the Earl publicly convert to the Creed which extends the church's influence in the region. While scouting, Thimble spies Univere and Doset Tachonis preparing to depart along with a House Seremai knight. They infiltrate the castle, heading into a cellar. Using Speak with Animals, Kat learns from a rat that anyone who ventures further dies without scent. Tyranny magically disguises herself as Occtis but fails to bluff her way past Tachonis guards. The Seremai knight unleashes a lizard-like creature that starts to turn Tyranny into stone.
10	"Blood for Blood"	03:32:20	December 18, 2025	Soldiers' cast (cold open: Schemers' cast)
Tyranny successfully resists the basilisk's gaze and prevents herself from turning into stone, although this causes the Tachonis guards as well as the Seremai Knight to attack, forcing the group to assist Tyranny and counter attack at the cellar's choke point. While Thimble manages to kill the basilisk, she herself is nearly killed by the knight, but survives with the aid of Wick. As the fight progresses, the rest of the group sees a carriage filled with large stone statues at the other end of the cellar, while the knight and the rest of the guards attempt to flee. Thimble recognizes the bracers worn by the Seremai knight belonged to Callowyn Royce, the younger brother to Lady Aranessa. Wick burns the carriage, preventing the knight from fleeing. Wick is then nearly killed himself but is saved by Kat. Thimble then finally kills the Seremai knight, while the rest of the group finishes off the rest of the guards. As the group searches the cart, they see Cyd has been turned into a statue.

=== 2026 ===
List of episodes in 2025
Episode	Title	Run time	Original release date	Notes
11	"Make Merry"	03:40:24	January 15, 2026	Schemers' and Soldiers' cast (cold open: Seekers' cast)
In Dol-Makjar, Azune, Bolaire, Hal and Murray meet in a private room at the Seven Stars tavern. Azune informs them of the mass Revolutionary Guard firing as well as the Candescent Creed waiting to hire mercenaries. They discuss options on how to stem the impact, such as hiring guards at the Archanade, and what contacts they have in the Sundered Houses that can be cultivated into sources. Downstairs, a wealthy couple remarks on an odd Royce party they left, which had only banquet food, no House representatives or servants, and a banner saying the Royces had departed for Faerie. Of the couple, Hal connects with Orus Blade. Azune realizes Thjazi did not attempt to trigger the escape spell-glyph at his execution, as it remained unbroken, but cannot determine how Thjazi knew the glyph was fake. In Tybry's Lea, Teor discovers all the statues are paladins frozen in a state of perpetual divination. Kattigan harvests the basilisk before they escape with the statues and documents. Reconnecting with the hounds, Morgaine secures a second cart for Cyd and takes the remaining statues before they leave. Kattigan returns the now magical knife to Tyranny. They decide to return to Dol-Makjar.
12	"The Giant's Belt"	03:36:29	January 22, 2026	Seekers' cast (cold open: O'Brien)
The Seekers' journey to Riesingürtle as they try to locate a Royce caravan that was held up in the days before Thjazi's execution. They meet a lux of the Candescent Creed, whom Thaisha discovers while eavesdropping, who is Tyranny's sister, Enmity, in disguise. Enmity informs her demon sisters that she believes Wick and Tyranny are in disguise as Occtis and Vaelus. Julien and Vaelus locate the caravan being held by House Einfasen. After conferring with Aranessa, they conclude that the caravan was detained to prevent Royce reinforcements from reaching Dol-Makjar before the Tachonis attack. Occtis worsens his internal damage by eating; the next day, Thaisha magically mends it. Julien and a disguised Occtis seek an audience with Lord Otto Einfasen's daughter, Ingrid. Ingrid loops in her father, who presents them with a missive ordering the caravan to be detained on suspicion of a hidden assassin; Julien identifies it as a forgery. They are unable to stop a messenger pigeon, sent without permission by Ingrid's handmaiden, heading towards Dol-Makjar. Julien informs Otto of the Tachonis attack. Otto forcibly insists on the retrieval of Aranessa and her companions. As they arrive, Thaisha notices something off and spots Ingrid crying in a window.
13	"Seeking Sanctuary"	03:38:09	January 29, 2026	Seekers' cast (cold open: Jaffe)
Unsure if they are guests or prisoners, Aranessa and the Seekers try to discern Otto's motives. While Aranessa meets with Otto and Occtis hides, Thaisha and Vaelus discuss the Shapers' War. Julien attempts to send messages to the Golden Orchard, then breaks down in his room while experiencing a flashback to his first melee and the advice his father gave him. Thaisha briefly meets with Otto, who asks whether the Circle of Ancients has taken a position on the Sundered Houses' infighting and reveals that she alone is not being detained. Otto states that, contrary to House Royce's account, House Tachonis claims Royce killed Occtis and returned to Faerie. The group confers on the potential motivations of various Houses before deciding to escape; Aranessa and Occtis leave letters for Otto refuting the Tachonis's story. A Tachonis carriage arrives before Thaisha departs through the front gate with the horses. The others escape by leaping from the guest quarters using Feather Fall. As the castle's alarms go off, Thaisha leads them to Schongarten, a Circle of Stone druid sanctuary. Thaisha meets with representatives of various Circles to have a "hard converstation" about Occtis since the druids believe the undead need to die.
14	"A Bridge Too Far"	03:42:16	February 5, 2026	Seekers' cast (cold open: Bailey and Willingham)
Thaisha speaks with Amadah of the Circle of Seasons, Hannan of the Circle of the Hunt, and Mozor of the Circle of Stone, explaining Occtis's undead origins and her suspicion that they disrupted a Tachonis plot to destroy the Old Path. When the other Seekers join, tensions rise as Hannan and Vaelus confront each other as elven survivors from opposing sides of the Shapers' War. After Occtis refocuses the druids and retells his experience, Vaelus reveals the Stone of Nightsong. Mozor determines it was made from the bones of El-Naumri, a celestial. Noting the sorrowful aspect of the miracle that brought Occtis back, Amadah declares him a negligible threat. Hannan departs as Amadah and Mozor agree to aid them, including transport to Gerwyn. While heading to the aerie, the Seekers are ambushed on a bridge by Tachonis soldiers and Occtis's older brother, Frons. A three-way combat ensues when Tyranny's demon sisters, who have been stalking the group after mistaking Occtis and Vaelus for Wicander and Tyranny in disguise, join the fight. The demons realize their error as the Seekers spot Occtis' sisters, Petra and Ryah, flying towards the bridge. Julien shoves Frons off the side before they escape.
15	"Flight to Castle Torch"	03:45:29	February 12, 2026	Seekers' cast (cold open: Carazo)
With the help of Amadah and Hannan, the Seekers escape Occtis' sisters aboard a carriage carried by a giant eagle. As they travel, Vaelus teaches Occtis how to meditate since he can no longer sleep. Occtis magically identifies the druids' gifts, including the magical book Kibbenimkedaz, which names the world's stones. The group arrives at Gerwyn and head to Castle Torch, a Barrowguard outpost serving the Barrowdell of the Eternal Night. The region has been shrouded in darkness since Tansul, god of the sun, was killed. After reuniting with former comrades, Julien brings the party before Captain Phaedron, the outpost's head, who dismisses all but Dame Gaya Seremai for the debriefing. Julien reports the fall of Houses Royce and Davinos. It is then discovered that Occtis' sisters manipulated Gaya into relaying undocumented orders purportedly from the Revolutionary Council that sent the Barrowguard's Third Battalion to Tannesar within the Eternal Night; Thaisha's son Alogar serves in this battalion. Gaya is dismissed from the Barrowguard for lying about the origin of the orders; Occtis accepts her as his vassal. Aranessa then departs for the Golden Orchard with an escort, while the rest head toward the Eternal Night.
16	"Visions of Shadow & Stone"	03:55:12	February 19, 2026	Seekers' cast (cold open: Daymond and Moore)
At the Shadowlight Waypoint, the Seekers encounter a caravan bound for Venatus composed of the Order of Roses, the Candescent Creed, Masha of the Circle of Ancients, and Dr. Amry Talter of the Totality. Hannan has apprised Masha of Occtis; Masha warns that Thaisha's actions may force her to leave their Circle. Occtis realizes that the prophecy Talter hopes to fulfill has already been completed. Talter, whose studies focus on celestials, admits her difficulty with mysticism. When Thaisha reveals they are heading to Tannesar, Talter calls it the "Place of Wings" before experiencing a vision. She explains that at Tannesar, Tansul granted his followers the ability to create celestials if he were killed. The Seekers, Talter, and Gaya travel into the Eternal Night along the fallen Obridimian Empire's elevated highway, the Tiria Via, passing fallen colossi. They flee a shadow creature and shelter in a ruined temple, where Occtis uses the Kibbenimkedaz and receives a vision of Tansul explaining to his priest that creating a celestial requires sacrifice. Occtis conjectures this is why his own heart was removed. Arriving in Tannesar, the party finds a fallen Barrowguard. One transforms into a swarm of nightingales that lifts Vaelus into the air.
17	"The Place of Wings"	03:46:14	February 26, 2026	Seekers' cast (cold open: Ray)
As a swarm of nightingales lifts Vaelus into the air, Julien separates her from the Stone of Nightsong. Taisha catches it, triggering a near-death experience shared with Vaelus. Vaelus then attunes to the Nightsong, taking control of it. The Seekers enter the desecrated Tannesar and discover an abandoned House Tachonis campsite with dead footsoldiers, Barrowguard, and unidentified figures. Julien kills a giant scorpion, which Occtis realizes belonged to his cousin Tertia. The group is then swarmed by undead, but Occtis destroys a Tachonis-enchanted crystal, stopping them. Investigating the campsite, they find numerous documents, including internal Tachonis reports detailing experiments to create a celestial, Deva Vindicta; a journal noting the loss of an artifact linked to another celestial, Olbalad, in Venatus, possibly taken by "drowned men"; and letters concerning Tachonis forces hidden outside the Golden Orchard. Taisha recovers the body of Pascard Velmonte, who in Venatus had previously given her the celestial coffin for Thjazi. Using the Nightsong, Vaelus begins casting Speak with Dead to question him. Pascard agrees to the exchange if his own questions are answered.
18	"Vindicta & Vale"	04:00:13	March 5, 2026	Seekers' cast (cold open: Riegel)
Pascard reveals that, a day after giving Taisha the coffin, he and the Drowned Men were warned by Mara the Wing of the Tachonis's plan and instructed to destroy the obelisk in Tannesar. Upon arriving, they were arrested by the Barrowguard, but Pascard convinced Alogar of the danger. During the ensuing conflict with the Tachonis, Pascard saw Alogar and other Barrowguard push deeper into Tannesar before he was killed. On the Path, Pascard explains that although he sold his soul to the Tachonis, he later joined the Drowned Men, whose pull prevents the Tachonis from claiming him in death. The party ventures deeper into the site of the Deva Vindicta ritual. Seeing the damaged obelisk and the Tachonis corruption of the ritual, Occtis realizes his vision was tied not to Alogar but to this chamber where Alogar had fought. Descending further into darkness, a feral winged skeletal creature kills Gaya; Occtis identifies it as Tertia, transformed by the ritual experimentation. Julien and Vaelus nearly die killing her; Occtis discovers Tertia's heart was replaced with angelic remains. Unable to find Alogar, the Seekers decide to return to Dol-Makjar with the information they had gathered from Tannesar.
19	"Hand & Wheel"	03:54:46	March 19, 2026	Schemers' cast (cold open: Daymond and Willingham)
Azune presents two Misty Step glyphs – the fake given to Thjazi and the genuine one held by Thimble – to pottery merchant Orus. Orus explains that his company, Hand & Wheel, was recently forbidden from producing such spell-glyphs and that a shipment of blank glyphs was stolen. He identifies Thimble's as one of the stolen blanks later imbued with fae magic, while the fake is a high-quality forgery, suggesting significant production resources. Hal and Bolaire realize the Hand & Wheel mark appears on the paint amphorae left by Thjazi. Outside his home, Hal evades Filoneus Halovar, who seeks information on Wicander; Azune convinces Filoneus he is a Candescent Creed follower. Later, Hal comforts a grieving Azune. The next morning, Murray apologizes to Dean Kora. They discuss a new Archanade internship program; Kora gives Murray until day's end to choose students, excluding Demodus Blix. At the Archanade, Bolaire consults the Selodyne Wing curator Makmaz Gelfidar about relocating artifacts before the takeover. At the Brethren Hall, Hadronius Einfasen instructs Azune to lead the investigation of Palazzo Davinos. Hal researches halfling sacred masks at the Grey Library, discovering that a key book is missing. As he is leaving, Hal witnesses the arrival of Timmony's royal entourage.
20	"The Vanishing"	03:51:12	March 26, 2026	Schemers' cast (cold open: Johnson and Ward)
While reviewing internship applicants, Bolaire and Murray are concerned that Demodus is missing. Bolaire instructs his team to create bureaucratic delays. King Augustus's retinue is looking for their missing king; Augustus's sister expresses sympathy to Hal for Thjazi's death. Hal suggests the Seven Stars to meet locals. Azune's investigation, overseen by Harondus, proceeds. With guard Groto, Azune confirms a lack of magical residue, indicating a cover-up. Harondus privately interrogates Azune, noting a Chamber of Lords-Advisory request; Azune falsely blames Thjazi for his past as a child soldier and denies religious ties. Bolaire and Murray secretly induce Groto into having a fake vision of the Tachonis's real involvement, then slip away as Azune escorts Groto to the other guards. Regrouping at the Hallowed Round, they link Demodus to the site via his signature blue-flame illusion. Investigating amphorae and theater murals, they uncover illusion magic concealing a stronger force between conjuration and necromancy, possibly indicating a doorway. Learning that theater illusionist Misha Undragor has been arrested as Demodus's larceny accomplice, Azune and Hal arrange for his release. Misha explains he only had a stylistic discussion with Demodus. The group concludes that the Tachonis hired Demodus to help with the cover-up.
21	"King of Cards"	03:42:50	April 2, 2026	Schemers' cast (cold open: Iyengar and O'Brien)
The Schemers dine at the Seven Stars. Upstairs, Hal meets privately with his fight choreographer, Inez Rountree, and her sister Romina, a maid at the Einfasen estate. Assured of confidentiality, Romina reports troubles among the Sundered Houses: Halovar's Photarch is searching for a missing Wicander, the theater's main patron; House Royce's men in Riesingürtle have been arrested, and Einfasen has received no replies from the Golden Orchard; Occtis Tachonis is also missing after last being seen at the Palazzo Davinos; and although Otto Einfasen seeks a summit of the House heads, Primus Tachonis is unreachable. Downstairs, the others watch a high roller's card game. Murray gets the arcane smuggler Pimley away from the game; Pimley admits he turned Demodus over to the Crow Keepers. A disguised Bolaire joins the game. When Hal returns, he recognizes a player, "Gus", as Timmony's King Augustus. In Caravan Hill, Murray consults the fey fortune-teller Temelow, who provides the Crow Keepers' location. The group scouts the sewer hideout; a magical distraction draws off some guards, but one spots them and approaches.
22	"The Point of No Return"	03:44:10	April 9, 2026	Schemers' cast (cold open: Bailey and Ward)
Bolaire and Azune silently kill a guard approaching their location. The party overhears a discussion between the Crow Keeper captain and Laumy, a fey creature. Murray magically strikes Laumy to instigate an altercation between Laumy and the Crow Keepers. This allows Hal to retrieve Demodus. As Laumy kills off the guards, Demodus accidentally draws attention. The Crow Keepers are defeated, with one left alive; Bolaire scares off Laumy. Demodus reveals he initially thought the Royce goodbye message he was instructed to create was a joke. However, while working, he noticed dispelling magic and Tachonis soldiers taking Davinos's possessions. Demodus then overheard a lieutenant describe the soldiers as loose ends to Ophelia Seremai who notes the lieutenant is also a loose end but will be given "the scar". Realizing the danger, Demodus escaped and attempted to flee the city. Bolaire offers to shelter Demodus; the party also discovers a stash of blank spell glyphs and gems. Privately, Bolaire requests Hal kill his current body and then place his mask on the unconscious Crow Keeper so Bolaire can take possession of the new body. Before leaving, the party and Demodus muddy the scene with signs of various city factions.
23	"Buried Truths"	03:55:31	April 16, 2026	Schemers' cast (cold open: Moore and Riegel)
Azune escorts Bolaire and Demodus to Bolaire's apartment while Murray accompanies Hal to Thjazi's burial. The Schemers manage their day jobs: Murray adds Hal's daughter Hero to the Archanade internship pool and Bolaire has his staff instigate discord in the museum's cataloging. That evening, Hal and Bolaire head to the Archanade to retrieve the Pariah Blades while Murray magically identifies Azune's Palazzo Davinos recovery as the Candle of Slaughter. Through divination, she discovers the Tachonis plan to attack the Golden Orchard. Bolaire learns Lady Cormoray is unhappy with the work started at the museum. While moving the Pariah Blades, a magical alert summons Cormoray. Unable to deceive her, Bolaire redirects her to Olbalad's coffin, which contains a cracked black mask revealed to be his sister, Termina. The mask attaches itself to Cormoray's face before retreating back into the coffin with Cormoray. The group reunites at the Rookery's theater to compare discoveries. Bolaire, believing Termina died killing Rauwyn, questions his own memories. They then conceal the Pariah Blades at the Hallowed Round using magical paints. The work week continues; an investigation into Cormoray's disappearance is opened. Varen reports gathering 350 former soldiers interested in opposing the Houses.
24	"Good Tidings"	05:06:59	April 30, 2026	Schemers' cast (cold open: Bailey)
Surprised by the number of volunteers Varen found, the Schemers adopt magpie iconography for their allies. Romina informs Hal and Bolaire that Primus Tachonis will be in Dol-Makjar in five days; the premiere of Hal's play, KoTher'ai, coincides with a meeting of the Houses. Meanwhile, Orus updates Murray and Azune. They head to Hand & Wheel, discovering that Thjazi ordered enchanted amphorae delivered to a pigment shop. The week progresses with the Schemers maintaining day jobs. Azune learns that Demodus is deprioritized due to the missing Cormoray. The Schemers have a limited discussion with the guard of Knife and Palette Pigments since the owner is out of town. Murray and Bolaire theorize the paint shares a similar energy signature with the Stone of Nightsong and Olbalad's coffin. Hal is upset by Thjazi's schemes. Later, at the Archanade, Bolaire hosts a masquerade gala attended by King Augustus and Photarch Yanessa Halovar; some of Varen's soldiers work as event guards. Yanessa requests a meeting with Hal to review his play. Augustus confronts Yanessa over the Candescent Creed's actions; an invisible Murray follows them. Hal spots knights from Argosia, a nation hostile to Timmony; a disguised Bolaire hears the sound of a loaded crossbow.
25	"Targeted"	03:25:05	May 7, 2026	Schemers' cast (cold open: Seekers' cast)
King Augustus and Photarch Yanessa, along with some of their attendants, meet privately in a room away from the gala. Murray uses Invisibility to spy from within the room while Azune and Bolaire are positioned in the hallway and Yanessa's son Filoneus guards the door. In the main area, a disguised Hal follows an Argosian nama Lord-Minister Gorson Brightmane. Murray spots the King's attendant druid falsely clearing his cup of poison, resulting in Augustus collapsing. The room is stormed by assassins who overwhelm the guarding knights; one assassin mortally wounds Yanessa. During the fight, Azune and Bolaire tactically use See Invisibility to reveal additional threats while Murray invisibly protects Augustus. Using a divination ability, Murray tries to ensure that Yanessa will die; however, she discovers that Yanessa is faking her death. Meanwhile, Hal breaks Brightmane's magical concentration, which frees the King's druid from his control; the druid heals Augustus. The soldiers hired by Azune arrive, swinging the battle in their favor. An assassin intervenes to protect Azune; before she escapes, Azune identifies the assassin as his sister Mayali. Filoneus kills the only remaining assassin. As witnesses rush to the scene, Yanessa "resurrects" – Murray realizes the attack was staged.
26	"Council of Heroes"	04:44:42	May 21, 2026	Full cast
Yanessa decries both the assassins and city leadership, calling for a motion of no confidence against the Revolutionary Council. Augustus tells Murray to meet him the next evening. At Castle Torch, Julien reunites with his mother who informs him of the Golden Orchard's destruction and political realities. Ingrid Einfasen has also arrived to pursue Julien's hand; she tells them of the upcoming Sundered Houses meeting in Dol-Makjar. The Seekers head there the next morning by giant eagle. Meanwhile, Kattigan bluffs his way past a gate check to smuggle the Soldiers into Dol-Makjar. At the Archanade, they reunite with Bolaire, Murray and Azune. While exchanging information, they make a plan to cure Cyd's petrification and debate heading to the Hallowed Round or Hal's house. The Seekers land in the woods outside Dol-Makjar. At the Hallowed Round, which is just outside the city, Hal is managing KoTher'ai's production when the Seekers sneak in. Thaisha updates Hal on Alogar before they all head into the city. At the Archanade, Hadronius Einfasen asks Azune to present hard evidence of House Tachonis's crimes at the Palazzo Davinos to House Einfasen at the Stahlkeep, the family's estate, rather than at the Brethren Hall.
27	"Complicated Questions"	04:47:36	May 28, 2026	Full cast
A week and a half after Thjazi's funeral, everyone reunites at Hal's house. They debate the intended purpose of Thjazi's magical paints, which were unknowingly used to create murals in the Hallowed Round, and whether KoTher'ai's opening night should be cancelled. Hal, Thaisha, and Kattigan meet with Yanessa, who demands that her corrections to KoTher'ai be implemented for the play to open; Hal falsely agrees. Yanessa also realizes that Kattigan knows something about what happened to Wicander, whom she says was kidnapped by Teor. Bolaire, Wicander, Tyranny, Teor, and Julien meet with Tsul'rekshi, the proprietor of Knife and Palette Pigments and an anarchy fiend. A game of questions reveals that Wicander is an aasimar. Tsul'rekshi also explains that, while she cannot confirm the client's ultimate intention, the paint was created from a profane artifact – the headwaters of the River Gavzidra – which deserved to be unraveled so the souls of the Rungjani could be liberated. The river of blood was created from Azgra's blood and passes through the underworld. Meanwhile, Murray, Azune, Vaelus, and a disguised Occtis secure Augustus's support for a rebellion after giving him part of a letter confirming House Tachonis's involvement in the assassination attempt.
28	"Chasing Shadows"	05:15:00	June 4, 2026	Full cast
At the Hallowed Round, Hal enacts a plan to oppose the Candescent Creed's control over the play. Meanwhile, Taisha, Thimble, Occtis, and Vaelus visit Thjazi's grave to contact his spirit. Finding it absent, Taisha delves into druidic magic. The group fends off Occtis's dead grandfather, who is hunting the spirit. Elsewhere, Murray and Azune arrange for Desmodus to join King Augustus after his testimony to House Einfasen. Reviewing the testimony, Azune realizes Mara the Wing was captured and taken to Obrimus Manor. Back in the Archanade, Teor's brother Cyd is cured of petrification and reveals overheard information, including the Tachonis' interest in the Sea of Lachris within the Realm of the Dead. The group divides into three teams: Wicander, Tyranny, and Bolaire to spy on the Sundered Houses meeting; Hal, Taisha, Murray, Azune, Kattigan, Hannan, and Vaelus at KoTher'ai's opening; and Thimble, Julien, Teor, Cyd, and Occtis to rescue Mara. The next morning, Wicander and Tyranny return to Villa Aurora, where Wicander convinces his grandmother he has returned to the Light. At the Einfasen meeting, Lord Otto promotes Azune to captain after receiving testimony and physical evidence of the Tachonis attack. In the Tintazi Wood, Vaelus and Hannan discuss Sylandri.
29	"Opening Night"	04:47:39	June 11, 2026	Full cast
Kattigan reflects on discovering his wife Marienna and their daughter were killed by a sorcerer seven years ago. He is suddenly captured by Tyranny's sisters. After Primus and his children leave for the meeting, Occtis, Thimble, Julien, Teor, and Cyd sneak into the crypts of Obrimus Manor. Wick and Tyranny place Bolaire onto Lux Adora. KoTher'ai begins, presenting Vokjan Murzat's failed revolution against Azgra before the Shapers' War. The performance summons the spirits of those killed in the revolution, including Vojkan, into the Hallowed Round as a bridge is built to the long-lost orcish afterlife and to Faerie. The Stone of Nightsong also reacts to the play, and Vaelus and Hannan take it into the woods. Undead attack the group in the crypts. Occtis raises Gaya as undead to defend them, and they flee into the undercroft. Wicander attends the Sundered Houses meeting. Otto accuses Primus of attacking Houses Royce and Davinos and murdering Occtis. Primus reluctantly confesses to his plans but insists that Royce was weakening the alliance. Lady Cormoray returns, secretly wearing Termina. Tyranny's sisters present Kattigan to Yanessa, who sends him to be killed by the Mercanauds. Kattigan recognizes Primus as the sorcerer who killed his family.
30	"Here in the Dark"	05:36:34	June 18, 2026	Full cast
Tyranny and her sisters bring Kattigan to the Mercanauds. Termina, under Lady Cormoray's influence, angrily tries to kill Bolaire. He jumps out a window to join Tyranny, killing Adora. At the Hallowed Round, the bridges become unstable. Vaelus must choose between allowing the Stone of Nightsong to join the ritual or using it to bring herself and her family's souls to Faerie. She smashes the stone to choose both unsuccessfully, so she chooses the ritual. Azune unintentionally awakens a dragon, who stabilizes the bridges, creates a fae glade, and vanishes into the river. With the return of House Tachonis imminent, the group at Obrimus Manor splits up. Julien retrieves the gemstone that cursed Alba and kills Koral, Occtis' oldest brother. His shadow acts on its own to aid him. Teor and Cyd, attempting to rescue petrified paladins, stumble onto the undead Raimond Davinos. They are killed, and Teor's magic takes his emblem to Wick, who immediately understands he is dead. Occtis and Thimble rescue Mara. While the others escape, Thimble stays to look for Teor and Cyd. At the Mercanauds' couturier, Tyranny convinces her sisters to return home. She frees Kattigan and tricks Rulius into wearing Bolaire. They kill Calastro.
31	"Trick of the Light"	06:18:43	June 25, 2026	Full cast; Willingham is absent in this episode.
Thaisha guides the souls of Vokjan's failed revolution onto the Path, realizing only they were freed from Azgra's afterlife. Hal leads the audience into the city for revelry. At Obrimus Manor, Julien and Occtis witness Hannan's arrival. Inside, Thimble escapes with the bodies of Teor and Cyd, utilizing Teor's bracers to gain a humanoid form. An enraged Primus arrives, kills Hannan, and orders an immediate departure from the city. Julien and Occtis flee with Mara. Wicander arrives but must justify his presence; Primus tests Wicander by requiring him to kill one of the workers or be killed himself. An Einfasen carriage waylays Azune and Murray. Lord Otto decides to prepare for a fight with House Tachonis. Halovars arrive to arrest Hal for the theft of the Pariah Blades but are thwarted when Thaisha intercedes. When everyone regroups, they mourn their fallen and discover Thjazi's soul is trapped in Julien's shadow. At the theater, Mara explains that their massive ritual has triggered a race to free other lost afterlives. The Seekers decide to investigate House Tachonis in Timmony before meeting Mara at the Golden Orchard. The Schemers remain in the city. Thaisha departs alone to face her grandmother.
32	"Road of Dreams"	03:52:13	August 27, 2026	Seekers' cast
The Seekers – Thimble, Kattigan, Julien, Vaelus, Occtis, and Bolaire – experience interconnected dreams. Vaelus can no longer access her paladin abilities; her Matriarch threatens revenge upon learning Vaelus allowed the Stone of Nightsong to be destroyed. Following the directions of an Archfae, Thimble leads the group onto the extradimensional Miller's Road. In under an hour, the Seekers cover what would have been two days of travel in the Material Plane and decide to exit at a tree near Ulbid's mountain. Thimble and Kattigan reacquaint themselves with Ulbid and the kettle-hobs. Ulbid informs them of recent highway movements: King Augustus' caravan should reach Timmony by nightfall; the Argosian caravan abandoned their heraldry before entering Timmony; and the well-defended Tachonis caravan is moving quickly and nonstop toward Timmony after killing and reanimating their horses. The party plans to get ahead of the Tachonis caravan via the Miller's Road, slow them down with a rockslide further ahead on the real road, and then try to reach Augustus' caravan in case the Argosians make a second assassination attempt. Thimble tells Ulbid that his missing daughters were turned into statues by the Tachonis. After some debate, Ulbid joins the group while wearing Bolaire.
33	"Off-Balance"	04:42:24	September 3, 2026	Schemers' cast (cold open: Carazo and Jaffe)
Photarch Yanessa ambushes Hal in his own kitchen, with breakfast, where she threatens Hal that she will delight in destroying his life's work and reputation before seeing him hang. The Schemers – Wick, Tyranny, Murray, Azune and Hal – meet to discuss politics, trust and next steps. The Revolutionary Council, the continent's governing body, is returning to the city to address the motion of no confidence. All nine members are rarely in the city at once, contributing to the council's dysfunction. Since the revolution grew out of Dol-Makjar's rebellion, the city has three elected council seats. Hal, Wick and Tyranny make a deal with Tsul'rekshi to create charmed invitations to KoTher'ai to draw council members to the show. Meanwhile, Murray and Azune meet with Effie Parvinas, a Dol-Makjar council member and former innkeeper who ran on a reform platform. Effie is unreceptive when Murray explains that Houses Halovar and Tachonis are orchestrating a coup; however, she acknowledges the no-confidence proceedings could trigger elections for all of the city's seats. Effie is upset by their continued use of telepathy, throwing them out of her office. Hal reviews messages and learns that his daughter Hero has been expelled from the Penteveral.
34	"Rock and Flame"	04:39:05	September 10, 2026	Seekers' cast (cold open: Daymond and Ray)
The Seekers, Ulbid, and the kettle-hobs settle at The Caller's Perch to discuss plans for stalling the House Tachonis from reaching the Kingdom of Timmony. Thimble and Clauncy successfully push the large boulder, creating an avalanche that blocks the pathway to the borders. The party suddenly notices the House Halovar caravan heading straight to Dahapshanee Wood, and Vaelus investigates one of the carriages containing the fae poachers. Thimble and Kattigan realize they previously destroyed the Wraith's tree, which weakens Hawthorne's Glade defense. The Seekers use the Miller's Road on their way to Hawthorne's Glade. Upon arriving, the Seekers fight off the poachers, House Halovar soldiers, and the Candescent Creed members as the Hawthorne tree catches on fire. Occtis summons Dame Seremai with Vital Sacrifice, thus eliminating the Creed members; Julien draws his father's blade Sprezzatura against his foes; Bolaire casts Hunger of Hadar for creating whirlpools and fey portals, which assist Sallow the Hag; Vaelus constantly struggles to fight against them while being powerless, later healed by Hawthorne; Kattigan sends Wulferic to tackle the poacher captain, allowing Thimble to make a kill. The Seekers successfully won the battle, but the tree is destroyed, and Hawthorne weakens.
35	"Lead the Way"	03:22:45	September 17, 2026	Seekers' cast
With Hawthrone's Grove burnt, Thimble and Ulbid escort the fae to the cherry tree outside Dol-Makjar via the Miller's road. The party stays at Ulbid's home; Bolaire grapples Pimley, who reveals himself as Ulbid's nephew. Pimley admits to his mistakes in betraying Desmodus and confesses that the Halovars have been secretly harvesting hosts' shadows into fabrics and sending a large amount of fabric to Segundus Tachonis, Occtis' uncle, in Venatus under Zebani Halovar's orders. He believed they were packaged for movement across a Veil. The party realizes that the Halovars attempted to use this process on Teor. Julien is intrigued; Thimble pleads with Julien to spare Thjazi's shadow. The next morning, Julien trains Vaelus in fencing. Bolaire uses a spell on a Candescent Creed member he now controls, discovering that the filament tattoos are fading and House Halovar ordered the members to destroy the fairies out of desperation. As nightfall approaches, the Seekers take the Miller's road to Sloak where they meet the hounds and Demodus Blix, who loudly announces Occtis' arrival.
36	"Spectacle"	04:43:03	September 24, 2026	Schemers' cast
After visiting Tsul'rekshi, Halandil, Tyranny, and Wicander attend a sermon at the Cathedral. Elsewhere, Harondus orders Azune to approach Filoneus after uncovering the Halovars' cover-up of the Mercanaud twins' murders, targeting Kattigan and Bolaire as suspects. Yanessa advises Wicander to oppose Hal and tortures Tyranny. Refusing her advice, Wicander declares Hal his brother before the audience. Summoned by her sisters, Tyranny receives a message from her father, Ksha'aravi, who condemns her betrayal of House Halovar and orders her to destroy her physical form by sunrise. Meanwhile, Hal comforts Hero, who explains the political situation at the Penteveral and the Sundered House's influence. After placing the Magic Bug in the Dean's office, Murray faces resignation threats from Dean Kora and Effie over her political involvement. Seeking help from Tsul'rekshi, Tyranny learns of her father's hypocrisy and motives. The Halovars isolate Wicander and forbid Tyranny from contacting him, while Emmity beats her. House Halovar makes Wicander give a speech at the Hallowed Round to undo his rebellious attempt; however, Wicander escapes his father Godard's supervision and meets up with Hal and Murray for advice. As Wicander attends the speech, the assassins begin to ambush him.
37	"Death to Tyrants"	03:54:24	October 1, 2026	Schemers' cast
Tsul'rekshi performs a ritual that allows Tyranny to confront her father. As assassins attack Wicander, Hal stays with Harondus for private conversation while Azune and his Arcane Marshals fight them. Hal notices that a masked figure, Wick's sister Zebani, has cast Hold Person on Wick. During the fight, Wick's mother Iris magically transfers damage in an attempt to save her son. Azune confronts Zebani. Murray arrives with Misty Step to save Wick's life, which attracts Harondus' attention as he orders the Arcane Marshal to arrest Murray. On the verge of death, Wick realizes that he must free Tyranny from the Halovar contract. Wounded and bloodied, Wick breaks the contract instead of saving himself, sending Tyranny into the Pit and fulfilling Tsul'rekshi's ritual. After healing Hal, Tsul'rekshi's assistant casts Banishment, allowing Wick to join Tyranny in the Pit. Lioran, Wick's younger brother, also heals Wick with magic. Upon entering the Pit, Wick and Tyranny arrive at Ksha'aravi's palace, which contains thousands of chained, shrieking celestials who bow to Wick.
38	"A Heavy Crown"	04:05:24	October 8, 2026	Seekers' cast
The Seekers settle into Brauwla's Tavern to spend the night upon meeting King Augustus of Timmony. Demodus orders Pimley arrested as Thimble and Kattigan try to convince him to drop Pimley's charges. Occtis informs the King about his family entering the Kingdom of Timmony. Julien converses with Baroness Cosgrove while Vaelus befriends the Hounds of the Knight. After learning Demodus' argument with Ulbid, Thimble, Occtis, and Bolaire reveal Bolaire's true nature to Demodus. Julien's relationship with Cosgrove is cut short upon learning that her family is supporting forces against House Royce, leaving Julien heartbroken. Providing a distraction, Kattigan performs his dance routine with Vaelus to secretly pass a key to Pimley. After helping Pimley, Kattigan starts bonding with King Gus over their commoner roots, while Ulbid interrupts Bolaire's conversation with Vaelus. With Julien absent, the Seekers decide to inform King Augustus of their plans against House Tachonis, with Pimley freed from custody.
39	"The King's Request"	04:05:19	October 15, 2026	Seekers' cast
The Seekers inform King Gus about House Tachonis's plans for their trip to the Sea of Lachris. Upon reviewing the schematics of Tachonis's ship, Sir Marten explains that a device allows the ship to take possible positions of moving objects through time and space. After taking advice from Lisabetta Valian, Occtis suggests he might set himself as rightful Lord of House Tachonis, which the party is deeply concerned about. Occtis examines the body of Lord Heylewith Arrovale of Sloak, Tansul's worshipper during Shapers' War, and learns about the rituals of souls and deceased bodies being tied directly at The Pit. Occtis encounters Julien's Shadow as it springs to life and embraces Occtis, who decides to decline his Family's lordship. King Gus encourages Kattigan to be a better person. Pimley seeks atonement with Bolaire for body control to help rescue his cousins. Vaelus watches Thimble cast Plant Growth to provide healthy crops. Kattigan is stunned that some of the Hounds of the King resigned from their post and suggested recruiting them. Bolaire frees the lux, allowing Black Rabbits to seek retribution. After meeting Murray's cousin Jasper Mag'Nesson for construction, Occtis and Demodus both share spells as dawn approaches on Sloak.
40	"Masks in the Round"	03:56:55	October 22, 2026	Schemers' cast
Wick and Tyranny fly to Ksha'aravi's palace. At the Hallowed Round, Murray successfully earns Harondus's trust, and Harondus orders the Arcane Marshals to subdue the assassins. With Wick and Tyranny both vanished, Azune uses Mirror Image on Wick's face to lure Zebani, and he hits her with a Sorcerous Burst, knocking the mask free as Murray recovers it. With Zebani escaping, the assassins are captured and arrested for interrogation. Godard grapples Azune in a chokehold and demands his son's whereabouts. With Godard casting Silence in the theatre, Hal cannot question the assassins. Wick and Tyranny enter the palace to confront Ksha'aravi, where Tyranny reveals to her father about Tsul'rekshi. To Tyranny's surprise, Ksha'aravi does not know Tsul'rekshi, and Tyranny forgot the Demon's instructions. Wick surprises Ksha'aravi, who confirms his fate. Hal persuades the crowd to demand justice as Godard tries to kill Azune, causing Harondus to persuade Godard to release Azune. Harondus chooses to interrogate the assassins himself; Murray gives Azune the Magic Bug to record the interrogation. At the tavern, Murray joins Ephina Parvinas to discuss her suspicion of the Candescent Creed upon learning about the mask. Tyranny convinces her father about the Halovars and plans to use Wick's soul to obtain power against them. Tyranny privately tells Wick about the ritual that Tsul'rekshi secretly planned and suggests letting her father take the bait. As Ksha'aravi attempts to consume Wick's soul, Tsul'rekshi's tongue springs to life.
41	"True Nature"	04:30:17	October 29, 2026	Schemers' cast
Tsul'reskhi, Tyranny, and Wick capture Ksha'aravi. Ksha'aravi confesses that he works for Yanessa, having lost his true name to her long ago when he incorrectly guessed hers is Yanessa Halovar. In Dol-Majkar, Temelow tells Murray and Hal about the arrival of the fairies from Hawthrone's Glade and the resulting tensions with Laumy and his forces. Mayali knocks Azune unconscious and takes him home before he can plant the Magic Bug. Ksha'aravi introduces Wick, Tyranny, and Tsul'rekshi to Zgroog'Wazbashav, who devours the souls of deceased luxes, sold to Ksha'aravi through their unwitting warlock pacts, to create a false afterlife. He admits that Tyranny and her sisters are created from the essences of the deceased Urusha, demons who embodied noble concepts and rebelled against Iljaza, Azgra's consort and Queen of Demons. Tyranny was created from Iubaza, a demon of love. Tsul'rekshi gives Tyranny the Heart of Iubaza and a prophecy foretelling Ijaza's defeat by the reunited Urusha. Tyranny vows to free her sisters from the Halovar's control. Azune, understanding Mayali tended to him, is furious with Murray and himself for placing his life at risk. After the argument, Murray uses her desire to connect with Azune to create a magical communication device.
42	"A Stalwart Heart"	04:29:27	November 5, 2026	Seekers' cast
Vaelus removes her mourning veil to Thimble, revealing her scarred face and a prosthetic metal jaw. The Seekers, along with Dame Morgaine, Sir Groveland, and the Black Rabbits, drop off at Brandenfall close to River Viannen. The party discusses their plan to rescue Ulbid's daughters with fake statues crafted by Jasper Mag'Nesson and raiding the ferry that House Tachonis uses to cross the river. Thimble, Sir Groveland and the Black Rabbits will return to Caller's Perch to spy on Tachonis's caravan. Kattigan and Vaelus give Thimble their Seershadow Stroller cloak and Spring Charm for emergencies. At King Augustus's entourage, Julien trains Vaelus to improve fencing. Arriving at Caller's Perch, Thimble uses the cloak to sneak past the caravans. Her presence catches Primus Tachonis's attention as he casts See Invisibility on himself and Ethrand, and she quickly evades it. Thimble found the statues inside the cargo, and just as she flies outside, Primus catches sight of her. As Thimble struggles to escape Primus's clutch, Sir Groveland attacks Primus, allowing Thimble and the Black Rabbits to escape. Thimble returns with the party and, with Bolaire's spy ring, explains what she found at the Tachonis caravan. With the Tachonis caravan on high alert and approaching Brandenfall, the party suggests sinking the raft as their only option to stall the Tachonis caravan since Occtis's floating disk cannot carry all three. After quietly listening to their argument, Dame Morgaine advises an unforeseen boon may present itself and decides to go with Thimble to inspect the caravan.
43	"The Water's Edge"	04:27:07	November 12, 2026	Seekers' cast
44	"The Ferry Heist"	TBA	November 19, 2026	Seekers' cast
45	TBA	TBA	December 3, 2026	–

== Critical reception ==
=== Pre-release ===
On the announcement of the new campaign with a new game master, Kenneth Shepard of Kotaku highlighted that "Mulligan was broadly welcomed with open arms, but many Critical Role fans noted they were sad to see Mercer step down from the GM role, even if he will be a part of the campaign as a player". Dais Johnston of Inverse noted that after a decade and with additional "projects in development", it was understandable that the Critical Role cast might "want to shake things up" or reduce their involvement, though doing so altered a "formula" that had repeatedly proven successful. Aimee Hart of Polygon highlighted Mercer's previous "passing the torch" comments and noted that "stepping back to let new people into the limelight always comes with its fair share of risks, particularly for a company like Critical Role, whose fame, while it cannot be pinpointed to a single thing, was certainly helped by the electric chemistry these friends have with one another". She noted that the original cast has "remained a focal selling point for viewers", even when the show has included guests, due to their non-manufactured "relatability". However, Hart also felt it was "becoming clear" that Critical Role was more of a business than a "web series between friends" at this point and that "Critical Role has long outgrown its indie-like roots, especially with its fingers in pies like Amazon and AdHoc Studio. The only difference is that as time goes on, it's become impossible to ignore that Critical Role will, one day, outgrow its creators too".

Shepard also highlighted the additional surprise of a new setting for the campaign – "while diehards are mourning a fantasy setting they've been invested in for a decade along with Mercer's shift out of the GM's chair, this likely will make Campaign IV a better entry point for newcomers, as they won't have to catch up on years of lore to jump in and watch". Johnston similarly remarked that the campaign four changes "could be the shot in the arm the franchise needs to attract new fans daunted by the sheer quantity of episodes to catch up with, or it could mean failing to recapture the magic that happened on Twitch in 2015". Following the cast announcement, Jack Filsinger of TheGamer noted that Critical Role's Campaign 3 "already loosely dipped its toe into the idea of running concurrent tables after the Apogee Solstice arc was introduced, to much success". Filsinger praised the choice of a West Marches-style structure, commenting that it "not only meets the utilitarian needs of a franchise this big" but also "matches styles of fantasy storytelling that audiences are most used to". Francesco Cacciatore of Polygon highlighted how players typically discover a setting in a West Marches-style game, commenting that both the Critical Role players and their audience should uncover the setting of Aramàn together as the world itself will "grow and take shape" due to player "discoveries and their choices will create that kind of magical storytelling that Critical Role fans crave". He noted that with a West Marches-style, the "actions and discoveries" of the three groups "should have an impact on the other tables, creating the feeling of a world that is changing in real time".

=== Reception ===
Following the release of the first episode, Harvey Randall of PC Gamer praised the structure of introducing the large ensemble cast and explained that the "first episode operates like any good prestige fantasy drama, or the first chapter of a really good book. It flits between groups and perspectives, with a campaign opener I'm tempted to steal wholesale". Rotem Rusak of Nerdist highlighted the use of Thjazi Fang's funeral and how it draws the characters to "one another by their connection to the now-dead man" along with questions on "what went wrong in their plans" to save Thjazi – "this is what the audience is wondering too, leading everyone very naturally down the same path and into the heart of the story". Mollie Russell of Wargamer also praised the opening hook of Thjazi's funeral, noting that it is "filled with grief, love, and tension" and "every player at the table has a hand in making Thjazi Fang feel real". She also highlighted that it sets up "political, magical, and even divine" threats, commenting "when our own world feels unfamiliar, even unsafe, the story that Critical Role is setting up feels painfully poignant". Randall called the fourth campaign "a 'planets aligned' moment", noting it is "chaotic, messy, and has convinced me we're about to see something very special". Rusak commented that while the first episode is the "hardest nut of all to crack" as the premise must come together quickly, she felt "pulled into the story, riveted by its nuanced characters, eager to know what the world is hiding, teased by certain names and settings dropped but not explained, and overall on the edge of our seats at the conclusion". Russell opined that the first episode "re-establishes" a known fact that "Critical Role is a powerhouse of storytelling" and in particular, drew attention to the execution of Thjazi which "reminds us just how quickly a freedom fighter can be rebranded as a criminal – how those in power can reshape a narrative to suit their needs".

Jack Coleman of TheGamer highlighted fan "reception has been incredibly positive" and that while "the energy around the show had begun to stagnate during campaign three", the cast expansion with new members "has revitalised the show's formula. The fresh social dynamics and roleplaying styles on display have given existing fans something new and exciting to latch onto". Randall stated that he was "looking forward to when this massive group splits into three" since he felt the "pace can't be held", but added that he was already "smitten. Not only by Brennan flipping gracefully between perspectives and scenes, but by the A-game every player's bringing to the table already". Rusak commended Mulligan's work as the Dungeon Master as Mulligan "knows exactly when to lean in, guiding the story with more presence and gravitas, and unveiling important plot moments, and when to lean out, allowing his player characters to build the world around them and become more realized presences". She noted how Mulligan "subtly" informed and guided "his Player Characters throughout the first episode, reminding them of important details and feeding them critical story information without breaking the flow of the narrative". Rusak also praised the "fantastic" characters by the original Critical Role cast and called the new cast members "a welcome infusion of life to the world of Critical Role". Following the release of the fourth episode, Randall similarly commented that "Mulligan ain't screwing around" as the Dungeon Master – "not with worldbuilding, not with story pacing, and certainly not with the combats". In particular, Randall highlighted the Palazzo Davinos encounter where he has not "been this enthralled by a fight in actual play since the finales of past campaigns; on paper, the four players present didn't stand a goddamn chance" as the fourth "episode was two dice rolls away from opening on catastrophe. I'm left feeling like I just watched a scythe graze past".
