= Critical Role Productions =

Multimedia production company

Critical Role Productions, LLC
- Industry: Web series production; Film and television production; Tabletop games; Streaming service
- Founded: 2015
- Founders: Travis Willingham; Marisha Ray; Taliesin Jaffe; Ashley Johnson; Liam O'Brien; Laura Bailey; Sam Riegel; Matthew Mercer
- Headquarters: Los Angeles, California, United States
- Key people: Travis Willingham (CEO); Matthew Mercer (CCO); Marisha Ray (creative director); Ed Lopez (COO); Rachel Romero (SVP of marketing); Ben Van Der Fluit (SVP of business development)
- Number of employees: ~70 (2025)
- Subsidiaries: Darrington Press; Metapigeon; Scanlan Shorthalt Music
- Website: critrole.com darringtonpress.com beacon.tv

Critical Role Productions, LLC is an American multimedia production company incorporated in 2015 by the members of the creator-owned streaming show Critical Role. The company's first two shows, Critical Role and Talks Machina, originally premiered on Geek & Sundry. The company moved to its own studio space in 2018 and began producing new shows on its Twitch and YouTube channels. A split from Legendary Digital Networks was completed in early 2019, at which point Critical Role Productions took over production responsibility. Since then, the company has continued to launch new shows independently.

Critical Role Productions operates under several trade names for different forms of media, including the gaming imprint Darrington Press, the record label Scanlan Shorthalt Music, and the film and television production banner Metapigeon. In 2020, they established the Critical Role Foundation, a 501(c)(3) nonprofit organization, to manage the company's charity projects. In 2023, Critical Role Productions signed a first-look film and television deal with Amazon Studios, and in 2024, they launched a boutique subscription streaming service called Beacon.

== History ==
=== Geek & Sundry era (2015–2019) ===
Critical Role Productions was founded by the members of the creator-owned Dungeons & Dragons streaming show Critical Role in 2015. The group had originally begun playing at home in 2012. Felicia Day approached them about live-streaming their game on Geek & Sundry after learning about their private tabletop role-playing game from Ashley Johnson. To streamline the game's mechanics for the show, its characters were converted from Pathfinder to Dungeons & Dragons 5th edition before the web series began airing on March 12, 2015. The company's first show, Critical Role, was a success. The company's second show, Talks Machina, premiered on Geek & Sundry and Alpha, Legendary Digital Networks' subscription streaming service, in 2016.

In June 2018, Critical Role launched its own Twitch and YouTube channels, with cast member Marisha Ray announced as the creative director of the franchise. The company then began self-producing new shows and content that did not air on Geek & Sundry's channels. The sets for Critical Role and Talks Machina moved from Legendary Digital Network's studios to Critical Role's own studios in July 2018.

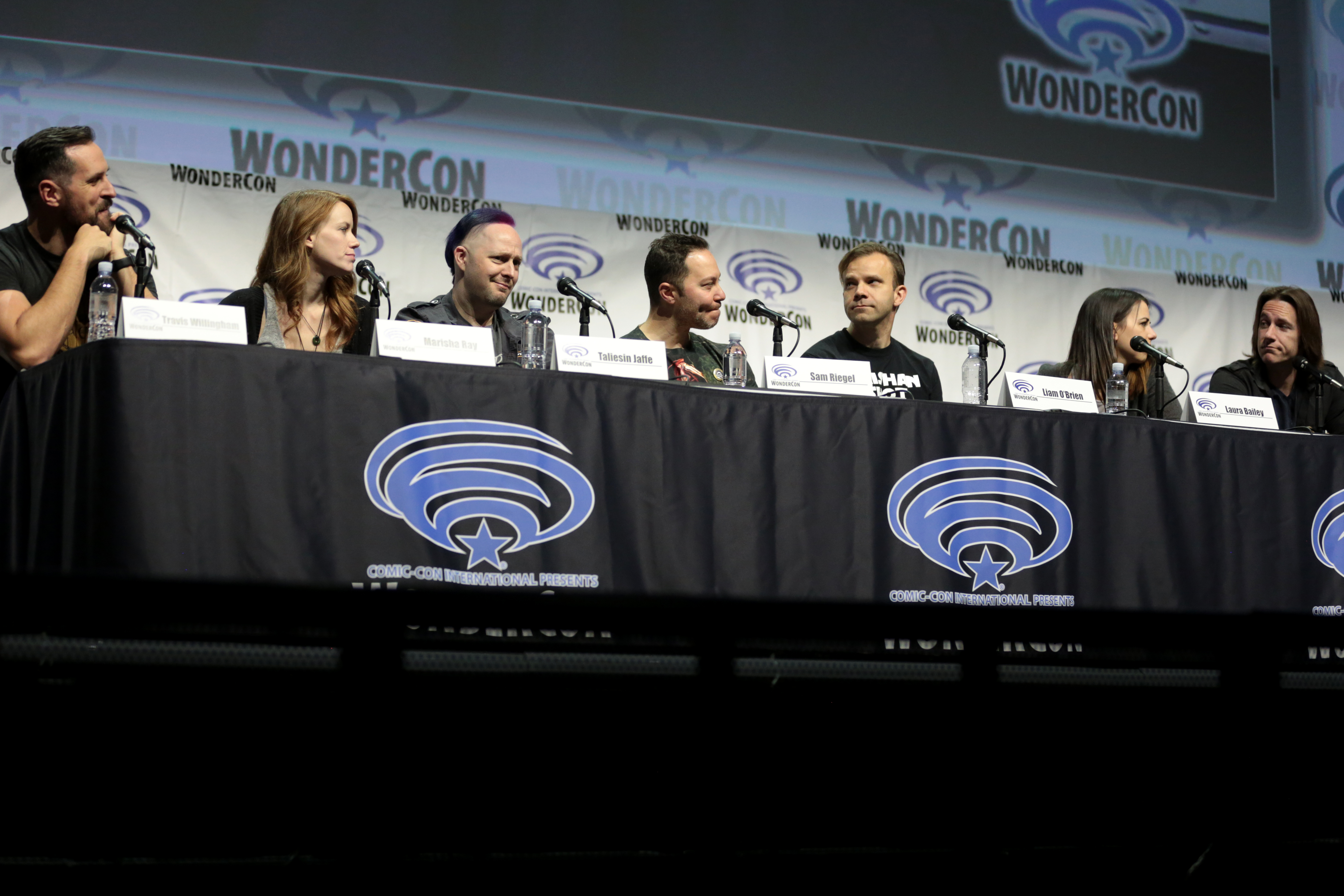
The main cast of Critical Role at WonderCon in 2017.

The eight founders—the cast members of Critical Role―are the owners of equity stakes in the company. Since 2019, Travis Willingham has been Chief Executive Officer, Matthew Mercer Chief Creative Officer, and Marisha Ray Creative Director. Several senior Legendary Digital staff members joined Critical Role during the split: Ed Lopez, head of digital strategy and operations, became chief operating officer; Rachel Romero, vice president of marketing, took on the role of senior vice president of marketing; and Ben Van Der Fluit was appointed senior vice president of business development.

=== Independent studio (2019–2021) ===
Critical Role's split from Geek & Sundry and Legendary Digital Networks was completed in February 2019. From this point, Critical Role took over production responsibility for the Critical Role and Talks Machina shows, with live broadcasts and video on demand (VOD) now airing exclusively on Critical Role's own channels. The disengagement from Legendary's streaming service Alpha led to the cancellation of Talks Machina: After Dark, which had been exclusive to the service. Some legacy episodes—including the entirety of the first campaign, the first nineteen episodes of the second campaign, and the corresponding episodes of official discussion show Talks Machina—remained available in Geek & Sundry's archives on YouTube and Twitch. Starting in December 2019, some older content was migrated from Geek & Sundry to Critical Role's channels.

On March 4, 2019, Critical Role launched a Kickstarter campaign to raise funds for a 22-minute animation called Critical Role: The Legend of Vox Machina Animated Special. The final total raised by the Kickstarter when it closed on April 19, 2019, was $11.3 million, allowing the intended animated special to be expanded into a ten-episode animated series. When the campaign closed, it was one of the fastest-funded projects in Kickstarter history and held the record for the most funded Kickstarter campaign for TV and film projects. In November 2019, Amazon Prime Video announced that it had acquired the streaming rights to The Legend of Vox Machina, and had commissioned fourteen additional episodes—two more for the first season, and a second season consisting of twelve episodes. The project was originally slated for release in late 2020, but was delayed until 2022 due to the COVID-19 pandemic.

In September 2019, Critical Role announced that it had negotiated licensing agreements with Funko, McFarlane Toys, Penguin Random House, and Ripple Junction to produce merchandise such as apparel and collectibles. On October 3, it aired a sponsored one-shot using the Feast of Legends RPG system, developed by fast-food chain Wendy's. Following a strong negative response from some fans, the Critical Role team removed the VOD, and announced via Twitter that they had donated their profits from the sponsorship. Shelly Jones, in an essay in the book Watch Us Roll (2021), speculated that the decision may have been made by the show's development team to deflect criticism about the "failed experiment". In the first half of 2020, a claim was made online that Critical Role had retained the services of a sensitivity reader, but had not paid the individual. As a result, the company called in outside counsel to investigate the claim. Whilst the investigation concluded the investigation in Critical Role's favor, the person who made the original claim tweeted that they had not been contacted during the investigation.

The coronavirus pandemic caused major scheduling changes for Critical Role Productions beginning in March 2020. This included a hiatus of four months for Critical Role itself, the launch of new remote format shows such as Narrative Telephone, and new remote formats for other shows including Talks Machina. A number of other shows were placed on hiatus. Darrington Press, a new board and card game publishing imprint, was announced by Critical Role in October 2020. In August 2021, Brian W. Foster, the host of Talks Machina and other shows, left the company to pursue other creative endeavors. This move effectively ended Talks Machina and Between the Sheets, the latter of which had been on hiatus since the pandemic. Critical Role returned to its pre-pandemic common table format with the launch of the third campaign in October 2021. In 2022, a new aftershow, 4-Sided Dive, was introduced.

A Twitch data leak in October 2021 revealed that Critical Role was among the highest earners on Twitch. The company received a total direct payout of $9,626,712 between September 2019 and September 2021 from Twitch in gross income from subscriptions and ad revenue. BBC News commented that this list of payments is unlikely to account for tax paid on income, and observed that many streamers featured in the leak are media operations in and of themselves with associated employees and expenses, meaning that the numbers may not represent actual “take-home pay”. Business Insider highlighted that Critical Role “had grown into a full-fledged media company [...] Its LinkedIn page lists employees in roles including marketing, business development, photography, editing, and even one person responsible for keeping track of the lore, or details in its fantasy world". Variety reported that, as of October 2021, the company had expanded to approximately forty employees, and that it had received no outside funding.

=== Industry expansion (2022–present) ===
In June 2022, Critical Role launched a new record label, Scanlan Shorthalt Music, to release original music inspired by Critical Role and the Exandria setting. Along with the label announcement, they released their first album, Welcome to Tal'Dorei. The new project was led by Ray and Senior Producer Maxwell James. In April 2022, Critical Role signed a multi-year deal granting SiriusXM "worldwide ad sales" for their podcast. The agreement also "calls for SiriusXM's Stitcher podcast subsidiary to distribute the show across all podcast platforms".

In January 2023, it was announced that Critical Role Productions had signed a first-look deal with Amazon Studios to create film and television series. The announcement also revealed an upcoming animated series based on the Mighty Nein campaign. Variety reported that the company would continue to produce under its production banner, Metapigeon. In March 2023, Metapigeon announced that it had purchased the space-western science fiction podcast Midst; this was the first time that Critical Role had acquired external intellectual property. The podcast was released with remastered audio and an ad-free subscription option. In July 2023, Critical Role Productions removed almost all content featuring former host Foster from its channels. Regarding the potential impact of the 2023 SAG-AFTRA strike on its content, Critical Role stated that it fully supported the strike and stood in solidarity with actors.

In December 2023, it was revealed that Critical Role was assisting in the development of the video game Tales of Kenzera: Zau by Surgent Studios. In February 2024, Critical Role announced that the open beta playtest of Daggerheart, the roleplaying game system by Darrington Press, was scheduled to begin on March 12, 2024, Critical Role's ninth anniversary. This playtest was available at select game stores, as a PDF, or on Demiplane via the Daggerheart Nexus. The Critical Role cast also ran a live playtest on their Twitch and YouTube channels on March 12, with a sequel playtest in May. Cheryl Teh of Business Insider said that "the crew appears to be embracing, once again, the funhouse chaos of its early-day Twitch streams". Hayley McCullough, for the American Journalism, speculated that Daggerheart may allow Critical Role "to fully sever its connections to Dungeons & Dragons and allow Mercer and the other players to use Daggerheart as their go-to system going forward". She commented that the "potential rippling consequences of such a move" is worth keeping an eye on.

In May 2024, Critical Role announced their new subscription streaming service Beacon. Sarah Parvini of The Washington Post commented that the new platform would allow Critical Role to "maintain creative control". Michael McWhertor of Polygon speculated that the company was attempting to reduce its reliance on third-party platform providers. In March 2025, CNBC highlighted that "the company has created more than 2,500 hours of original content, more than 30 original shows and published nearly 70 books, comics and novels in the last 10 years, many of which are based on the IP of its games". Also in 2025, Rolling Stone noted that the company has "roughly 70 employees, including not one but two people whose job it is to know all the lore Critical Role has developed over its three main campaigns, five spin-off shows, and more than two dozen one-shots".

In July 2025, Critical Role announced that a video game set in Exandria was in early development through a partnership with AdHoc Studio, and that they would be helping fund development of AdHoc's first game, Dispatch. Then in August 2025, they announced that Brennan Lee Mulligan would take over as Game Master from Matthew Mercer for Critical Role's fourth campaign which premiered on October 2, 2025. Rolling Stone stated that "the inclusion of Mulligan is huge, but not entirely surprising" given Mulligan's background as "a well-established Game Master" who created the "titanic success" Dimension 20 along with previous comments made by Mercer on eventually shifting "into a 'Professor X' role as a mentor to the next generation of storytellers rather than remaining the face of the brand in perpetuity".

== Broadcast ==
Critical Role Productions primarily broadcasts on the Critical Role Twitch and YouTube channels. This includes both livestreaming and VOD. A number of shows were formerly broadcast on Legendary's Alpha service from 2017 to 2019. They have also broadcast episodes on their boutique subscription streaming service Beacon since May 2024. The company's two animated shows, The Legend of Vox Machina (2022) and The Mighty Nein (2025), are available on Amazon Prime Video.

=== Podcasts ===
The Critical Role podcast was announced during the 100th episode of the first campaign. It is an audio version of the game sessions. As well as the Critical Role website, the podcast is available on iTunes, Google Play Music, and Spotify. The first campaign's podcast episodes were released in batches of 10–15, between June 8, 2017, and January 8, 2018. The campaign's episodes took just over 298 hours to listen to at 1.5x speed, or around 224 hours at double speed. The podcast episodes for the second campaign were released on the Thursday after the episodes streamed on Twitch. Starting in May 2024, the podcast was made available on the same day as release, exclusively to Beacon subscribers. In an essay on live-streamed tabletop RPGs, Friedman noted that "fans [of Critical Role] often recommend that a listener supplement their experience with strategic viewing of notable visual moments".

Talks Machina was also released in a podcast format from episode 101 until its conclusion. Like the podcast version of Critical Role, there was a one-week delay between the Twitch broadcast and the corresponding podcast episode's release. The Midst podcast was released with an ad-free subscription option that included an early release schedule and other bonus content.

=== Beacon ===
In May 2024, Critical Role Productions launched Beacon, their subscription video on-demand (VOD) over-the-top (OTT) streaming service. This service hosts the company's podcasts and web series, with additional exclusive content. Business Insider's Teh compared Beacon to a Twitch subscription, but with additional benefits. Moises Taveras of Kotaku commented that in addition to exclusive programming, Beacon subscribers would get "pretty standard benefits", like discounts on merchandise, access to presales for live event tickets, early access to shows, and a private Discord server. Christian Hoffer of ComicBook.com noted that following the launch of Beacon, there was an immediate drop in Critical Role's Twitch subscribers by roughly 20%, with the assumption that this reflected a migration to Beacon. In February 2026, Alyssa Zeisler became the service's general manager. In August 2026, Beacon expanded to smart TV platforms, including Fire TV, Apple TV, Google TV, and Roku; its Android and iOS mobile apps also added offline access to its web series.

The platform is named after the Luxon Beacons, which are in-universe fictional artifacts of religious and magical importance to the Kryn Dynasty.

== Productions ==
The company produces and broadcasts the following shows from its Burbank Studio location:

=== Current programming ===
==== Critical Role and podcast (2015) ====
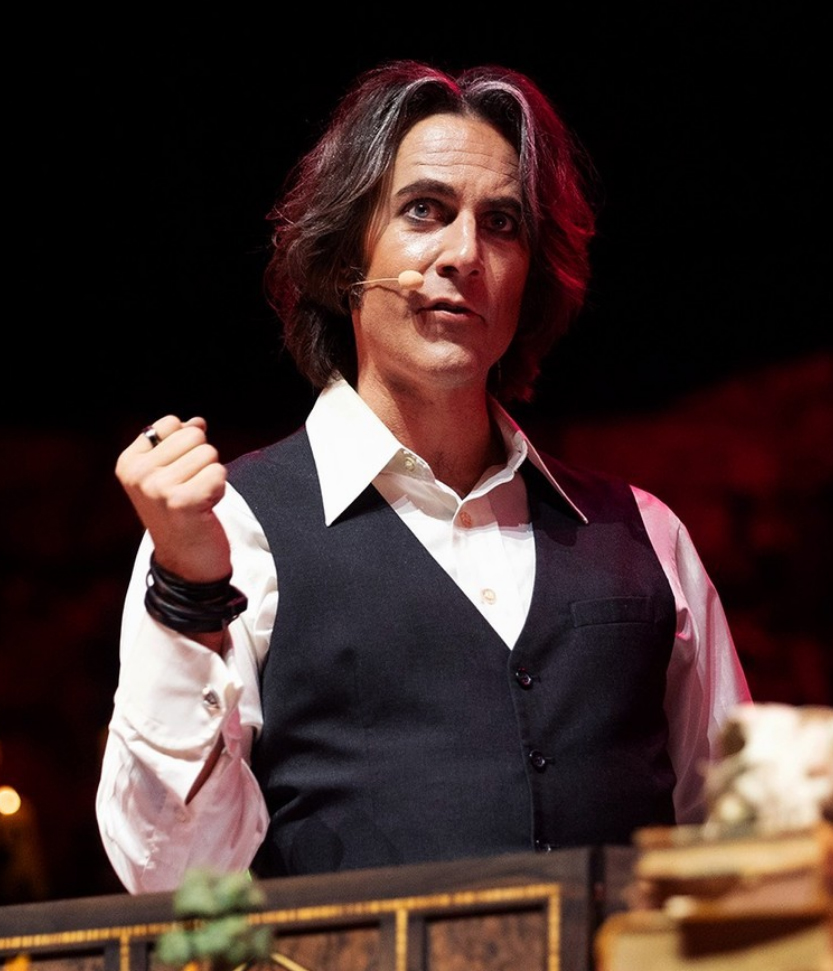
Mercer at the 2023 Critical Role live show in Wembley Arena.

Critical Role is the studio's primary series. It is broadcast on Thursdays at 19:00 PT on the Critical Role Twitch and YouTube channels, as well as the Beacon streaming service. The VOD is made available to these services immediately after the broadcast. As part of social distancing requirements during the COVID-19 pandemic, the show switched to a pre-recorded format. The show's third campaign aired from October 21, 2021 to February 6, 2025. The fourth campaign premiered on October 2, 2025.

==== #EverythingIsContent (2018) ====
#EverythingIsContent is a show of no fixed format. Several episodes have included sponsored content. The show has functioned as something of a testbed for the studio too; Pub Draw and MAME Drop originally debuted as pilots on #EverythingIsContent.

==== All Work No Play and podcast (2018–2020, 2026) ====
In All Work No Play, Liam O'Brien and Sam Riegel catch up over a drink and try a new activity each episode. The show was developed from Liam and Sam's original AWNP podcast (2012–2017), which predated the home game that would become Critical Role. The first season aired in 2018, and the second in 2020. In October 2026, Critical Role announced that the show would return with six episodes starting on October 28, 2026, exclusively on Beacon.

==== Critical Role Abridged (2024) ====
Critical Role Abridged is a version of the Critical Role show, edited and trimmed to 60–90 minute episodes beginning with the third campaign. Early access is available on Beacon. Jody Macgregor of PC Gamer highlighted the length of the individual episodes as a barrier to entry to finishing Critical Role's campaigns. He praised the abridged episodes in comparison, but criticized what he saw as excessive cutting of dice-rolling segments.

==== Critical Role Cooldown (2024) ====
Critical Role Cooldown is an immediate aftershow with the table cast, which airs after each episode of Critical Role. This show is exclusively broadcast on Beacon.

==== Fireside Chats (2024) ====
Fireside Chats is a monthly "ask me anything" style talk show, with questions from Beacon subscribers. It airs exclusively on Beacon and premiered on May 21, 2024.

==== Weird Kids (2025) ====
Weird Kids is a video podcast talk show hosted by Ashley Johnson and Taliesin Jaffe which focuses on their history as child actors growing up in the industry and other interests. It aired on Beacon and premiered on March 25, 2025, with a 24-episode run. Starting in March 2026, the first season was rebroadcast on YouTube and podcast networks. The second season premiered on May 5, 2026, exclusively on Beacon.

==== Daggerheart: Azerim (2026) ====
Daggerheart: Azerim is an actual play collaboration between Critical Role and the sketch comedy troupe Viva La Dirt League. The cast consists of Ben Van Lier, Adam King, Rowan Bettejeman, and Alan Morrison as players with Robert Hartley as the Game Master. It is set in Viva La Dirt League's Azerim setting and features their Baradun and the Dickheads adventuring party. Unlike previous actual plays by the troupe, this show uses the Daggerheart system instead of Dungeons & Dragons. The show has a staggered release schedule across streaming platforms – it premiered on Beacon on January 13, 2026, followed by releases on VIVA+ on January 20, 2026 and on YouTube on January 27, 2026.

==== Tale Gate (2026) ====
Tale Gate is a live talk-back show, hosted by Whitney Moore, for Critical Role's fourth campaign. The cast answer fan questions submitted on Beacon's Discord channel. It premiered on January 20, 2026 on Beacon, YouTube and Twitch; it also features a "Night Cap" segment exclusive to Beacon.

==== The Long Rest (2026) ====
The Long Rest is a podcast featuring family-friendly short stories narrated by Critical Role's cast and friends. The monthly show premiered on October 18, 2026, exclusively on Beacon.

==== Shattered Legends (2026) ====
Shattered Legends is an actual play collaboration between Critical Role and the Japanese VTuber agency Hololive Production. The six episode series is set canonically in Exandria and uses the Daggerheart system. In October 2026, it was announced that this series will feature Matthew Mercer as the game master with Marisha Ray and Hololive's English-speaking VTubers Nerissa Ravencroft, Mori Calliope, Shiori Novella, and Gigi Murin as the player cast. The series premiered on November 13, 2026 on Beacon and on Nerissa Ravencroft's YouTube channel; the series is in English, with Japanese subtitles available on YouTube. Mollie Russell of Wargamer commented that while "VTubers are still fairly rare in the West", they are popular "in other parts of the globe. Mori Callope has almost as many subscribers as Critical Role alone, and when combined, these VTubers have a following that dwarfs the world's biggest actual play".

=== Hiatus and future programming ===
==== Exandria Unlimited (ExU) (2021) ====
Exandria Unlimited is an anthology web series and spin-off of Critical Role. The first season of ExU featured a canon Critical Role story set in the city of Emon on the continent of Tal'Dorei, thirty years after the first campaign and ten years after the second. Hosted by Aabria Iyengar (the Dungeon Master), it was originally broadcast from June 24 to August 12, 2021. A two-part continuation was released at the end of March 2022. The second season, titled Exandria Unlimited: Calamity, premiered on May 26, 2022. It follows a group of heroes from the Age of Arcanum who attempt to prevent the Calamity, and are led by Brennan Lee Mulligan as the Dungeon Master. The third season, titled Exandria Unlimited: Divergence, was originally broadcast from February 13 to March 6, 2025 with Mulligan reprising his role as the Dungeon Master.

==== The Legend of Vox Machina (2022) ====
The Legend of Vox Machina is an animated series based on events in the first campaign. The first ten episodes of the first season were financed through a Kickstarter campaign, with Amazon picking up distribution and green-lighting an additional fourteen episodes: two additional episodes for the first season and a 12 episode second season. The COVID-19 pandemic delayed the release schedule from fall 2020 to its eventual premiere on January 28, 2022. In October 2022, Amazon renewed the series for a third season ahead of the second season's premiere on January 20, 2023. The third season premiered on October 3, 2024. It was renewed for a fourth season in October 2024; this season premiered on June 3, 2026. Ahead of the release of the fourth season, Amazon announced that the show was renewed for a fifth and final season.

==== Candela Obscura (2023) ====
Candela Obscura is a horror–themed actual play episodic web series, using the new Illuminated Worlds System designed by Darrington Press. It was created by Taliesin Jaffe and Chris Lockey, with Steve Failows and Maxwell James as producers, and Spenser Starke and Rowan Hall as the game's lead designers and writers. Since May 25, 2023, it has aired on the last Thursday of each month. Each episode focuses on a new investigation; Jaffe also serves as the show's Lightkeeper who provides the characters their missions. The cast of the first three-episode story arc was composed of Laura Bailey, Ashley Johnson, Anjali Bhimani, and Robbie Daymond, with Matthew Mercer as the game master. The cast of the second three-episode story arc was composed of Travis Willingham, Brennan Lee Mulligan, Zehra Fazal, Luis Carazo, and Marisha Ray, with Starke as the game master. The show went on hiatus in June 2024.

==== Age of Umbra (2025) ====
Age of Umbra is a grimdark–themed actual play series. It uses the Age of Umbra campaign frame developed by Mercer for the Daggerheart roleplaying game system. Mercer highlighted the influence of Soulsbourne on setting's development. The cast is composed of Ashley Johnson, Laura Bailey, Liam O'Brien, Marisha Ray, Sam Riegel, Taliesin Jaffe, and Travis Willingham as players with Mercer as the game master. Critical Role aired the session zero for Age of Umbra on May 22, 2025; this episode featured character creation and worldbuilding. The eight-part first season was broadcast weekly from May 29, 2025 to July 24, 2025, with a hiatus on July 3, and aired on Beacon and the Critical Role Twitch and YouTube channels. At Gen Con, in July 2025, Darrington Press announced a second season was in development.

In May 2026, Darrington Press announced that Age of Umbra: Sallowlands would premiere on July 9, 2026. This six episode mini-series features Bailey, Jennifer English, Vico Ortiz, Zachery Renauldo, and Abubakar Salim as players with Mercer returning as the game master. Aimee Hart of Polygon argued that Sallowlands showcases the Daggerheart system as "a force to be reckoned with" and is "a new opportunity to highlight the differences between" Dungeons & Dragons and Daggerheart, commenting that it could "entice new players who prefer a more flexible, creative game with a stronger narrative focus than D&D offers". Hart also highlighted "the creeptastic characters of Sallowlands" where "the cast's expert acting" and the Daggerheart system "is quick to differentiate each of them, both narratively and mechanically".

==== The Mighty Nein (2025) ====
In January 2023, it was announced that the second campaign would receive an animated television adaptation for Amazon Prime Video called The Mighty Nein. The series would be executive produced by Tasha Huo, Sam Riegel, Travis Willingham, Chris Prynoski, Shannon Prynoski, Antonio Canobbio, and Ben Kalina; Metapigeon, Amazon MGM Studios, and Titmouse would serve as the production companies. The show is under production; in June 2024, it was revealed that voice acting had begun. The first season premiered on November 19, 2025. The second season is scheduled to premiere in its entirety on March 24, 2027.

==== Reign of the Weredragon (2027) ====
Reign of the Weredragon is an upcoming actual play mini-series that will utilize the Hope & Fear expansion of the Daggerheart system. The show was announced at Gen Con 2026 with Chris Perkins as the game master. The weekly, live-streamed show is scheduled to premiere on January 13, 2027. The cast is composed of Taliesin Jaffe, Luis Carazo, Whitney Moore and Robbie Daymond.

=== Former programming ===
==== 4-Sided Dive (2022–2024) ====
In 4-Sided Dive, Critical Role cast members answer fan-submitted questions sourced from a "Tower of Inquiry", similar to a Jenga tower. The host is randomly selected by the roll of a d20 die. 4-Sided Dive replaced Talks Machina. The final episode aired in December 2024.

==== AWNP: Unplugged (2020) ====
In AWNP: Unplugged, Sam Riegel and Liam O'Brien catch up via video chat during the COVID-19 pandemic. Each episode after the first featured another Critical Role cast member, or a friend of the cast, as a guest. Andy Wilson, for Bleeding Cool, thought the show was an "exercise in human connection" and called it "beautifully simple".

==== Between the Sheets (2018–2019) ====
In Between the Sheets, Brian W. Foster interviewed a different guest each episode. Non-Critical Role guests included Logic and Amanda Palmer. The first season aired in 2018 and the second in 2019. A third season was scheduled to premiere on August 5, 2020, but remained in limbo after the production went on hiatus due to the COVID-19 pandemic in March 2020; Foster left the company in 2021. This show was removed from Critical Role's channels in July 2023.

==== Critter Hug (2020–2021) ====
Critter Hug was a "to-camera" show starring Mica Burton and Matt Mercer. The hosts discussed topics relevant to the "Critter" community. Only the first episode of the show was aired before California's COVID-19 lockdown measures began. Two further episodes were broadcast in 2021.

==== Critical Recap (2018–2019) ====
Critical Recap was a review of previous episodes of Critical Role, hosted by Dani Carr, the show's production coordinator. Starting with the eleventh episode of the second campaign, Critical Recap aired on the Geek & Sundry Twitch channel before the Critical Role live stream on Thursdays. After Critical Role's split from Geek & Sundry, new episodes of Critical Recap premiered on Critical Role's YouTube channel every Tuesday. Simultaneously, a rebroadcast aired on the Critical Role Twitch channel immediately before the Critical Role live stream on Thursdays. On YouTube, the show had roughly 20-50,000 views per recap as a standalone stream. The video format for Critical Recap was last used for episode 88 of the second campaign. Beginning in 2020, the show was replaced by a written recap made available on the Critical Role website. An animated version of the show was launched in December 2020.

==== Crit Recap Animated (2020–2022) ====
Crit Recap Animated was an animated spinoff of Critical Recap, hosted by Dani Carr. It was co-written by Carr, Kyle Shire and Marisha Ray, with animation by Offworld Studios. The show retold story arcs from the second campaign, in short, 5- to 10-minute episodes. The first episode premiered in December 2020 and introduced the main characters of the "Mighty Nein". The show completed its second campaign in August 2022.

==== Draw Your Weapons (2026) ====
Draw Your Weapons is an actual play series produced by Critical Role and Titmouse which features real-time illustrations as the cast plays. The cast is composed of Rashawn Scott, Sean Glaze, Heather Mahler, and Jason Charles Miller as players with Josh Knapp as the game master and with Blaine Capatch and Chris Prynoski as live commentators. The eleven episode season premiered exclusively on Beacon on February 25, 2026. The show was then removed from the Beacon platform and rereleased on Amazon Prime.

==== Handbooker Helper (2018–2020) ====
Handbooker Helper was a series of introductory to-camera videos on the different elements of D&D, hosted by different members of the Critical Role cast. The show's name was a parody of Hamburger Helper and a reference to the D&D Player's Handbook. Though not a requirement to watch, the Critical Role campaigns were often alluded to through inside jokes and other meta-references. A total of 42 episodes of Handbooker Helper were released before the series concluded in June 2019. In preparation for a Valentine's Day one-shot, an episode of Handbooker Helper explaining the basics of the Monsterhearts 2 role-playing game was released February 6, 2020.

==== MAME Drop (2019) ====
In MAME Drop, Taliesin Jaffe and guests would play old-school arcade games on the studio's MAME cabinet.

==== Midst (2023–2024) ====
Midst was a semi-improvised space-western audio drama focused on three protagonists, described as "a crotchety outlaw, a struggling cultist and a diabolical bastard – as their paths intersect in unexpected ways". The series took place in the town of Stationary Hill, after a mysterious civilization known as the "Trust" became interested in the islet of Midst, where the town was located. It began streaming in 2020 and was originally produced by the Third Person studio, which consisted of the podcast's three anonymous narrators. The podcast won multiple awards at the New Jersey WebFest in 2021 and 2022. (Note: Midst won three awards ("Best Editing of a Narrative Fiction", "Outstanding Science Fiction", and "Best of the Best") in the fiction podcast category at the New Jersey WebFest in 2021. In 2022, it won "Outstanding Science Fiction (Narrative Fiction Podcast)".) The science fiction podcast was acquired by Metapigeon in March 2023, and the first two seasons were rebroadcast by Critical Role starting in April 2023. This weekly re-release included remastered audio and a new video format which were then followed by a new third season. The final episode was released on June 26, 2024.

==== Mini Primetime (2019–2020) ====
Mini Primetime was a show hosted by Will Friedle on how to improve painting techniques, specifically for D&D miniatures. The show's first season aired in 2019, and was followed by a 2020 special under Talks Machina's "After Dark" branding.

==== Mighty Vibes (2020–2021) ====
Mighty Vibes featured a playlist of songs curated to the aesthetic of one or more members of the "Mighty Nein" and "Vox Machina". Songs would play over a looped animation featuring said member. Sound clips recorded by the players of the featured character or characters would be interspersed throughout the playlist.

==== Moonward (2024) ====
Moonward, a four-part limited series set after Midst, was announced in July 2024. It features Xen as the guide narrator, with Liam O'Brien, Marisha Ray, Matt Roen, and Sara Wile as players. Cheryl Teh of Business Insider highlighted that Moonward featured "just pure roleplay and acting" in comparison to other shows that had a stricter ruleset. The series aired from August 7 to August 28, 2024, with early access for Beacon and Midst subscribers.

==== Narrative Telephone (2020–2025) ====
In Narrative Telephone, the Critical Role cast and their guests would play a socially distanced version of Telephone using pre-recorded video messages. A reboot of this show, in a monthly video format, returned on October 16, 2024 on Beacon; it then releases on YouTube two weeks after the Beacon airdate.

==== Pub Draw (2019) ====
In Pub Draw, Marisha Ray would be taught how to improve her drawing by comic book artist and "Critter" Babs Tarr. The first and second seasons aired in 2019.

==== Tales From The Stinky Dragon (2024–2026) ====
Tales From The Stinky Dragon is an actual play podcast which originally premiered on Rooster Teeth. The cast consists of Barbara Dunkelman, Chris Demarais, Jon Risinger, Blaine Gibson with Gustavo Sorola as the Dungeon Master. Campaign 3, titled Kanon, of the podcast premiered on Beacon on September 30, 2024 with the YouTube premiere on October 2, 2024. The podcast was scheduled to broadcast every other Monday initially on Beacon and the show's Patreon and then publicly on YouTube following a 48-hour delay. Additionally, Beacon and the show's Patreon hosted the Second Wind aftershow for the podcast. In April 2026, Tales From The Stinky Dragon announced that "due to an update to our licensing agreement" the show would be removed from the Beacon platform except for the first campaign, The Infinights. While the show would no longer be distributed through Critical Role's platform, the current campaign would continue to be broadcast on the show's Patreon followed by a YouTube release.

==== Talks Machina and podcast (2016–2021) ====
Talks Machina was an aftershow hosted by Brian W. Foster, in which he and a few cast members discussed the most recent installment of Critical Role. The show aired live on Twitch at 18:45 PT on Tuesdays. In its original format, the cast answered fan questions on in-game events, decisions, or character developments. Weekly competitions were held for fan content submissions, with prizes for the winners, such as "fan art of the week" and "cosplay of the week". The winners were announced in interlude segments.

Originally, the first 100 episodes of Talks Machina were broadcast on Geek & Sundry's channels. Beginning in February 2019, as part of Critical Role's split from Geek & Sundry, new episodes began airing on the Critical Role Twitch channel. The VODs were available to Twitch subscribers immediately after the initial broadcast, and were also uploaded to YouTube on the following Thursday. Beginning in December 2019, as part of the migration of older content to the Critical Role channels, some episodes of Talks Machina were deleted from Geek & Sundry's channels and re-uploaded to the official Critical Role channels. The show was on hiatus from March to September 2020 due to the COVID-19 pandemic. It returned in a bi-weekly, remote pre-recorded format until its cancelation shortly before the end of the second campaign. YouTube views hovered "around 130-190,000 – or roughly 25 percent of the views of the [Critical Role] VOD itself". In July 2023, this show was removed from Critical Role's channels.

==== Talks Machina: After Dark (2017–2019) ====
Talks Machina: After Dark was described as an "extended after show for our after show", which would air exclusively on Alpha shortly after the conclusion of Talks Machina each week. The cast would respond to questions directly from the chat. The show ended its run after Critical Role split from Legendary and disengaged from Alpha. It was later announced that the After Dark suspension was temporary, but the show never returned. The After Dark branding was later applied to a "Mini Primetime" special in 2020.

==== The Re-Slayer's Take (2024–2025) ====
The Re-Slayer's Take is an all-ages actual play podcast set in Exandria, featuring an adventurer group that was rejected from the monster hunting group, "The Slayer's Take". The cast consists of Jasmine Bhullar, Jasper William Cartwright, Caroline Lux, and Jasmine Chiong, with George Primavera and Nick Williams as Dungeon Masters. The twelve-episode first season aired from May 20 to August 19, 2024; early access was available to Beacon subscribers. The show's second season aired from September 10, 2024 to March 3, 2025.

==== Thresher (2025) ====
Thresher is a deep sea horror–themed actual play limited series produced in collaboration with 12-Sided Studios. The setting was created by Matt Linton and Jacqueline Emerson and the game is based on Candela Obscura, an Illuminated Worlds System. Jasper William Cartwright is the gamemaster with Emerson, Abubakar Salim, Mara Hulmes, Jane Douglas, and Noshir Dalal as players. The first part premiered on April 24, 2025; the second part aired on May 1, 2025.

==== Travis Willingham's Yeehaw Game Ranch (2019) ====
In Travis Wllingham's Yeehaw Game Ranch, Travis Willingham and Brian W. Foster played video games. In July 2023, this show was removed from Critical Role's channels.

==== UnDeadwood (2019) ====
UnDeadwood was a four-part limited series, in which Brian W. Foster would "GM" a game based on the HBO series Deadwood using the Deadlands RPG system. In July 2023, this show was removed from Critical Role's channels.

==== Unend (2024) ====
Unend is an ongoing audio drama set several decades after Midst and Moonward by Third Person. The cast consists of Xen, Matt Roen, and Sara Wile. It premiered on October 9, 2024 with new episodes airing weekly on Wednesdays. Beacon and Midst subscribers have access to an early release schedule. The second season premiered on June 4, 2025, with its finale on October 15, 2025. The third and final season premiered on April 8, 2026. The series concluded with a postlude on August 26, 2026, followed by cast roundtable discussing the series finale.

==== Wildemount Wildlings (2025) ====
Wildemount Wildlings is a spin-off of the main Critical Role series which premiered on April 3, 2025. The three episode limited series focuses on teenage campers at the Wildemount Wildlings Camp for Adventuring Kids and their two Mighty Nein camp counselors with Sam Riegel as the gamemaster. The players are Eden Riegel, Aleks Le, Brennan Lee Mulligan and Libe Barer as new characters with Marisha Ray and Ashley Johnson reprising their Campaign 2 characters, Beauregard Lionett and Yasha Nydoorin respectively.

==== Yee-Haw Off the Ranch (2020) ====
Yee-Haw Off the Ranch was an at-home version of Travis Willingham's Yeehaw Game Ranch during the COVID-19 pandemic that starred Ashley Johnson and Brian W. Foster. In July 2023, this show was removed from Critical Role's channels.

== Licensed works and related products ==
Critical Role's commercial success has led to many related products, including the prequel comic series Critical Role: Vox Machina Origins, art books, multiple novels including Kith & Kin, two campaign setting books (Critical Role: Tal'Dorei Campaign Setting and Explorer's Guide to Wildemount), and an animated series. Hobby and toy stores sell miniatures and other collectibles related to Critical Role.

== Reception ==
In March 2020, CNBC reported that since its 2018 separation from Geek & Sundry, Critical Role Productions had significantly expanded, and amassed more than 120 million views on YouTube and many subscribers. It praised its diverse lineup, speculating that it could appeal to different demographics. Emily Friedman, in the book Roleplaying Games in the Digital Age: Essays on Transmedia Storytelling, Tabletop RPGs and Fandom (2021), highlighted Talks Machina for its "informal, even chaotic space" and how it reveals "additional narrative details". Friedman called it "a mediated space where fans are names and their labor showcased through the intermediaries of Foster and Carr, who are not players but viewers of the show, and who have become beloved in their own right. Other livestreams (Game Ranch, MAME Drop) have subsequently leaned into this parasocial pleasure, allowing for more time 'with' the cast".

By January 2021, Critical Role had amassed 220 million views across its channel, with 44,000 paid subscribers on Twitch during that month. Additionally, the first episode of the first campaign was watched 15 million times on YouTube. During the final ten months of the second campaign from August 2020 to May 2021, Critical Role's Twitch subscriptions averaged around 27,000 paid subscribers. Before the premiere of the third campaign in October 2021, Business Insider reported that Critical Role's official Twitch channel had 828,000 followers and 13,530 active subscribers, while its official YouTube channel had 1.4 million subscribers. In October 2021, Variety reported that Critical Role's Twitch channel had averaged 60 to 75,000 live viewers for each episode, and that factoring in on-demand plays after the fact, total per-episode viewership could range from 1.2 million to 1.5 million. Variety also noted that "Critical Role remains relatively small compared with other popular creators and digital media properties".

=== Brand growth ===
Academic Emily Friedman highlighted that Critical Role Productions was the only entity able to recover its episodes from Geek & Sundry, and that all other shows that premiered on Geek & Sundry remained owned by Geek & Sundry's parent company, Legendary. Friedman opined that "Critical Role was as smart as Legendary was dumb. Legendary didn't make them sign a contract until Critical Role LLC had already existed". Rowan Zeoli of Rascal noted how they treated their "experimental production as a legitimate business early on" and praised the team's pre-emptive legal protections. Regarding Critical Role's success, Friedman explained in an interview with Zeoli that "you have to be lucky, but also be prepared for the luck".

On Critical Role's eighth anniversary in 2023, Christian Hoffer of ComicBook.com highlighted the brand's growth and described it as a "Hollywood success story unlike any other". Luke Winkie of Slate stated that Critical Role had fast become a "fixture of the geek-media ecosystem" and had been aided by its third-party investments. Academic Jan Švelch wrote that an analysis of the company's sponsorships "highlights the complexity of the mediatization process" and stated that both physical and digital gaming producers saw the show as an effective advertising channel. He commented that Critical Role was now "an outlier in the space of actual play where merchandising and product licensing are otherwise considered negligible source[s] of revenue".

Cheryl Teh of Business Insider considered Beacon a "daring gambit" that could cause disruption for partners like Twitch and YouTube. Tyler Chancey, for TechRaptor, compared the development of Beacon to Dropout. Moises Taveras of Kotaku highlighted that Beacon was "not quite going the way" of Dropout, which hosts all of its programming on its subscription service, but said that it had avoided the controversies of Watcher, which had faced backlash for locking future content behind a subscription before later reversing the decision. Taveras opined that Beacon was an option for "immensely dedicated Critters" that wanted to directly support the company. Tara McCauley, for The Escapist, said the contrast between Critical Role's and Watcher's respective subscription rollouts was "night and day". McCauley observed that the influx of traffic to Beacon caused temporary crashes and delays, further highlighting the stark contrast between the two announcements.

=== Open Game License ===
On January 5, 2023, Linda Codega reported that io9 had received a leaked copy of the Open Game License 1.1 (OGL1.1). Both the Critical Role: Tal'Dorei Campaign Setting sourcebook and its updated edition, Tal'Dorei Campaign Setting Reborn, were published under the original OGL, which has allowed a wide range of unofficial commercial derivative work based on the mechanics of Dungeons and Dragons to be produced since 2000. The language reportedly within OGL1.1 would revoke the original OGL, and would be much more restrictive to third party content creators. Critical Role's official statement made no mention of the OGL and instead spoke of its support of the tabletop game community. The statement also mentioned supporting developers of new [TTRPG] systems. While some were disappointed by the statement, others thought it was a legally shrewd statement. ICv2 speculated that the company "likely needed to walk a fine line between not criticizing one of their biggest sponsors (WotC/D&D Beyond) while, at the same time, quelling their fan base's simmering outrage". In the ComicBook.com podcast The Character Sheet, Christian Hoffer speculated that Critical Role could be under contract to use the 5th edition system for the remainder of its third campaign, and that there may be "non-disparity clauses" preventing them from speaking out against Hasbro, its subsidiaries, and its products. In an interview with Codega, Ray stated the importance of having "an environment that does allow these creators; independent, big, small, to create and make new things. Whichever way allows the community to do that, that's where we're going to stand and support". On the draft OGL1.2 separating some Dungeons & Dragons content into a Creative Commons license, Mercer stated it was "a grandiose step in a grandiose direction".

=== Accolades ===
The Critical Role channel has won the following awards:

Year	Award	Category	Result	Ref
2019	Webby Awards	Video Series & Channels – Games	Won (Webby Award & People's Voice)	
2019	Shorty Awards	Games	Won (Finalist & Audience Honor)	
2021	Shorty Awards	Games	Nominated (Finalist)	

== Charity involvement ==
Critical Role Productions collaborated with Stephen Colbert for Red Nose Day in a special one-on-one adventure with Matthew Mercer as Dungeon Master, which aired on May 23, 2019. Fans were able to donate to the cause and vote on various elements of the adventure, such as Colbert's companion, character class, legendary weapon, and the villain. In the one-shot campaign, Colbert played a half-elf bard named Capo, who was accompanied by a bee named Eric. The event raised $117,176.20 for the charity.

=== Critical Role Foundation ===
The official logo.

In September 2020, Critical Role Productions launched a new 501(c)(3) nonprofit organization, Critical Role Foundation, with the mission "to leave the world better than we found it". Ashley Johnson was named president of the organization, with Matthew Mercer, Eduardo Lopez, Rachel Romero, and Mark Koro serving as officers and board members. Critical Role Foundation stated that 85% of donation funds would go to partner non-profits, 10% would be allocated into an emergency fund, and 5% would be allocated to administrative fees and operating expenses. The emergency fund will allow the foundation to donate contributions "in the event of natural disasters and other unforeseen events that require immediate humanitarian assistance". CBR reported that the foundation would partner with other organizations in the non-profit sector that share similar values to the show and its community.

In an interview, Johnson explained that Critical Role has collaborated with several non-profit organizations aligned with the community's values. These charities include 826LA, Red Nose Day, OSD, Pablove and OutRight International. Since the streaming began in 2015, the Critical Role community has donated over half a million dollars to these causes, according to Johnson. To ensure tax-deductible donations for donors, the team decided to establish a 501(c)(3) non-profit foundation. Johnson clarified that while the Critical Role Foundation would be closely connected to the larger Critical Role community, it would operate as a separate entity.

In 2022, the Critical Role Foundation won two 2022 Shorty Impact Awards: the Gold Honor in "Best Fundraising Campaign" and the Audience Honor in "Best Influencer & Celebrity Partnership" for its Red Nose Day campaign with Colbert titled "Choose Stephen's Adventure… Again!". This campaign raised over $423,000, which was a 252% increase over the 2019 campaign.
