= Daggerheart =

Fantasy role-playing game

- Daggerheart logo
- Designers: Spenser Starke (lead designer), Carlos Cisco, Rowan Hall, John Harper, Matthew Mercer, Alex Uboldi, Mike Underwood
- Writers: Layla Adelman, Meguey Baker, Banana Chan, Chris Davidson, Rue Dickey, Felix Isaacs, Erin Roberts, Deven Rue, Rogan Shannon, Mark Thompson, Eugenio Vargas, Chris Willett
- Publishers: Darrington Press
- Publication: May 20, 2025
- Genres: Tabletop role-playing game
- Chance: Dice rolling
- Skills: Role-playing, improvisation
- Website: daggerheart.com

Daggerheart is a fantasy tabletop role-playing game published by Darrington Press, an imprint of Critical Role Productions. The game was released on May 20, 2025.

== Gameplay ==
Daggerheart is a story-driven role-playing game, where the rules encourage players to think narratively and not just mechanically. The game uses a system called Duality Dice, where players roll two twelve-sided dice—one for Hope and one for Fear. In addition to determining whether the player succeeds or fails at the action they are trying to perform, it generates a helpful Hope resource for the player, or a challenging Fear resource for the game master. Lead designer Spenser Starke explained that there is "also no initiative in Daggerheart. It functions very much like a Forged in the Dark or Powered By The Apocalypse game, where the GM is making moves on certain dice rolls and we're passing play back and forth as a conversation. It all flows together in a way that supports the storytelling-first direction that Critical Role has really embraced over the last decade".

The game features 279 supplemental cards to track player abilities and characteristics. Darrington Press also launched several digital resources, including an online custom card creator.

== Publication history ==
In April 2023, Darrington Press announced that they were creating two new roleplaying game systems – Illuminated Worlds for short campaigns and Daggerheart for longer campaigns – which were scheduled to have a public playtest during Gen Con in August 2023. Development of Daggerheart was led by lead designer Spenser Starke with co-designer Rowan Hall. Production on the project started after their work was completed on Candela Obscura. The open beta playtest of Daggerheart began on March 12, 2024; this playtest was made available at select game stores, as a PDF or on Demiplane via the Daggerheart Nexus. The Nexus edition includes digital character creation tools. The Critical Role cast also ran a live playtest on their Twitch and YouTube channels on March 12, with a sequel playtest in May 2024. Hayley McCullough, for the American Journalism, speculated that Daggerheart may allow Critical Role "to fully sever its connections to Dungeons & Dragons" with cast using "Daggerheart as their go-to system going forward". She commented that the "potential rippling consequences of such a move" is worth keeping an eye on.

Daggerheart was released on May 20, 2025. The Age of Umbra limited series also started airing that month; the series features the cast of Critical Role playing Daggerheart in the "Age of Umbra" campaign frame created by Darrington Press creative advisor Matthew Mercer for the system. Business Insider reported that Daggerheart "sold out worldwide in under a week after its launch in May", with Critical Role Productions' chief operating officer Ed Lopez noting that the amount of ordered units was expected to be a year's supply but instead "lasted us literally two weeks". Lopez referred to this as "a Champagne problem" which changed their "view in terms of what this product can be". Darrington Press also released a system reference document (SRD) for the game in May 2025. Wargamer explained that "sharing a free SRD is common practice in the world of tabletop RPGs" as it allows "third parties to create license-safe spin-off products of the original work". Additionally in 2025, Darrington Press signed a sales and distribution agreement for U.S. and international markets with Macmillan Publishers to expand the release of their roleplaying game books in "the book channel, in addition to its existing distribution in the hobby channel". Lin Codega of Rascal noted this included both "their new fantasy heartbreaker, Daggerheart," and "their backlist" titles.

In June 2025, Darrington Press released a new playtest for expanded Daggerheart mechanics including new character classes and ancestries. At Gen Con, in July 2025, Darrington Press announced multiple upcoming expansions for the game – a romantasy themed campaign frame titled "With Love and Magic" scheduled for release in 2026, a setting exploring a new genre for the game by Jeremy Crawford, an "interconnected adventure supplement" for various Daggerheart campaign frames by Chris Perkins, and a "new world" with player options created by Keith Baker and Jenn Ellis. Darrington Press also announced a Kickstarter, which then launched on September 30, 2025, for a play accessory focused on the nine classes from the core rulebook. In November 2025, Darrington Press announced the upcoming expansion sourcebook Daggerheart: Hope & Fear; it is scheduled to have an early release in August 2026 followed by a wide release on September 22, 2026. The sourcebook "nearly doubles the character creation options" with the inclusion of new classes and subclasses, ancestries, and community options as well as a new transformation mechanic which adds options such as "werewolf, vampire, ghost, or demigod". For Game Masters, the sourcebook adds "100 new gear items", "more than 130 adversaries", and "four new campaign suggestions with their own custom mechanics and themes".

== Reception ==
The game sold out upon release. After the game's release, Mercer stated that Daggerheart was a major part of the company's future business plans.

Multiple reviewers compared the game to Dungeons & Dragons (D&D), noting that the actual play show Critical Role started with the 5th Edition D&D. Game designer Rob Wieland praised the game in Forbes, stating that the game "celebrates the best parts of D&D while also not having to worry about legacy mechanics and earlier editions". Benjamin Abbott of GamesRadar+ liked the Hope and Fear mechanic for making it easier to act as the gamemaster. Samantha Nelson of Polygon felt that Daggerheart made failure more interesting, as well as improving choices for non-spellcasters. Jen Karner, for CNET, pronounced her "love" for Daggerheart as "the most accessible TTRPG I've ever played", including the game's use of cards to track gameplay as an alternative to the rulebook. GamingTrend also reviewed the game, saying that it is "a polished, inventive contender in the fantasy TTRPG space, marrying elegant mechanics with a strong narrative ethos".

=== Awards and nominations ===
| Year | Award | Category | Work | Result | Ref. |
|---|---|---|---|---|---|
| 2026 | ENNIE Awards | Best Free Game / Product | Daggerheart Quickstart Adventure: The Sablewood Messengers | Gold Winner | |
| 2026 | ENNIE Awards | Best Game | Daggerheart Core Set | Gold Winner | |
| 2026 | ENNIE Awards | Best Rules | Daggerheart | Gold Winner | |
| 2026 | ENNIE Awards | Product of the Year | Daggerheart | Silver Winner | |
