= Critical Role–related products =

Works based on Dungeons & Dragons

Critical Role, an American web series in which a group of professional voice actors play Dungeons & Dragons, has spawned many related products, including books, comics and an animated series, which are produced by Critical Role Productions. Various third-party, licensed works have also been released since Critical Role began in 2015.

== Animated series ==
=== The Legend of Vox Machina ===
On March 4, 2019, the Critical Role cast launched a Kickstarter campaign to raise funds for a 22-minute animation called Critical Role: The Legend of Vox Machina Animated Special. The animated story was to be set just before the streaming portion of the campaign started—when the players were around level seven—during a time when, canonically, there is an in-game period of roughly six months when the members of Vox Machina were not all together at the same time. The cast projected a cost of US$750,000 for a single 22-minute animated short, fulfilling the other campaign rewards, and the fees associated with a crowdfunding campaign. Not knowing how long this would take to raise, the campaign length was set at 45 days.

Within an hour of launch, however, the Kickstarter had reached more than $1,000,000. At the end of the first full day, all of the announced stretch goals had been unlocked, and the total had reached more than $4.3 million. With four 22-minute episodes funded in the first 24 hours, additional stretch goals were added, expanding the project into an animated series. The first two episodes would cover the pre-stream story arc. The subsequent episodes would adapt the Briarwoods' arc, also from the Vox Machina campaign. By March 18, 2019, eight 22-minute episodes had been funded. Finally, on April 4, 2019, the last published stretch goal of $8.8 million was reached during the airing of episode 57 of campaign two, pushing the total length of the animated series to ten episodes. A "secret" $10M stretch goal of Willingham being filmed going around a haunted house was reached April 16. The final total raised by the Kickstarter when it closed on April 19, 2019, was $11.3M. When the campaign closed, it was one of the most quickly funded in Kickstarter history, and was the most funded Kickstarter for TV and film projects.

The cast reprise their respective Vox Machina roles, with the exception of Orion Acaba. The animated series is written by Jennifer Muro, and animated by Titmouse, Inc. In November 2019, Amazon Prime Video announced that they had acquired the streaming rights to The Legend of Vox Machina, and had commissioned 14 additional episodes (two additional episodes for season 1 and a second season of 12 episodes). An update posted to the Kickstarter campaign assured backers they would have access to the first season. The project was originally slated for release in late 2020, however in June 2020, it was announced that the debut would be missed due to the COVID-19 pandemic. The Legend of Vox Machina premiered on January 28, 2022; the soundtrack for the first season premiered the same day digitally.

=== The Mighty Nein ===
In January 2023, it was announced that the second campaign will receive an animated television adaptation for Amazon Prime Video. The series will be executive produced by Tasha Huo, Sam Riegel, Travis Willingham, Chris Prynoski, Shannon Prynoski, Antonio Canobbio, and Ben Kalina; Metapigeon, Amazon MGM Studios, and Titmouse, Inc. will serve as the production companies. In July 2025, it was announced that the first season of The Mighty Nein is scheduled to premiere on November 19, 2025.

== Books ==
The Chronicles of Exandria
- Vol. I: The Tale of Vox Machina; Vol. II: The Legend of Vox Machina; The Mighty Nein; The Mighty Nein Part Two
- Author: Matthew Mercer, Dani Carr, Liam O'Brien, Taliesin Jaffe, James Haeck, Lauryn Ipsum, and the cast of Critical Role
- Country: United States
- Language: English
- Publisher: Hunters Books & Apparel; Dark Horse Books
- Published: 2017 - 2025
- Media type: Print
- No. of books: 4

=== Art books ===
On August 18, 2017, at a live show in Indianapolis, a Critical Role art book titled The Chronicles of Exandria Vol. I: The Tale of Vox Machina was announced. It includes backstories for Vox Machina and some of the non-player characters (NPCs), and features artwork from the community. It was released in November 2017. The Chronicles of Exandria Vol. II: The Legend of Vox Machina, a sequel to the first art book, was released in November 2018.

The Mighty Nein art book, The Chronicles of Exandria: The Mighty Nein, was published on March 31, 2020. In Publishers Weekly's "Best-selling Books Week of June 15, 2020", The Chronicles of Exandria: The Mighty Nein was #19 in "Hardcover Nonfiction" with 3,968 units sold. A sequel, The Chronicles of Exandria: The Mighty Nein Part Two, released on February 11, 2025. It was written by Dani Carr, in collaboration with the Critical Role cast, from the perspective of the fictional bookshop proprietor Iva Deshin, an NPC introduced in the second campaign.

On July 29, 2025, the art book Critical Role: The Armory of Heroes was published. It focuses on the outfits, armor, weapons, and magic items of the Vox Machina, the Mighty Nein, and the Ring of Brass characters. It was illustrated by Ana Fedina and written by Martin Cahill. It also features the in-universe "perspective of three Exandrian historians" who "commentate on the artwork, diagrams, and histories" of the featured characters. Jack Filsinger of TheGamer called the book "a loving tribute" and praised the artwork, commenting that the "details of every item, costume, piece, and accessory are so specifically rendered that each illustration ends up feeling like a challenge for cosplayers to recreate to a tee". Filsinger also highlighted that the "framing and commentary" along with the "diagram-esque zoom-ins on weapons of choice, give the entire book a sense of historical reverence, as though this is a book that could be distributed within Exandria itself".

=== Novels ===
A prequel novel set before campaign one, Critical Role: Vox Machina – Kith & Kin by Marieke Nijkamp, was released on November 30, 2021. The novel focuses on the twins, Vex'ahlia and Vax'ildan, and their encounter with the criminal organization known as The Clasp. "This is the first fiction novel released by Penguin Random House's Del Rey imprint, following a 2019 licensing agreement".

A prequel novel set before campaign two, Critical Role: The Mighty Nein – The Nine Eyes of Lucien by Madeleine Roux, was released on November 1, 2022. It focuses on the backstory of Lucien the Nonagon including his origins in Shadycreek Run and becoming a Blood Hunter along with the discovery of the tome that leads him to become the Nonagon.

A prequel novel set before campaign three, Critical Role: Bells Hells – What Doesn't Break by Cassandra Khaw, was released on October 8, 2024. It focuses on the backstory of Laudna as she leaves Whitestone and explore her travels as she makes her way to Marquet.

An anthology of short stories focused on non-player characters (NPCs) from campaign one, Critical Role: Vox Machina – Stories Untold, was released on March 4, 2025 in celebration of Critical Role's tenth anniversary. It features a foreword by Liam O'Brien, and stories written by Jess Barber, Martin Cahill, Rebecca Coffindaffer, Aabria Iyengar, Sam Maggs, Sarah Glenn Marsh, Rory Power, Nibedita Sen, Izzy Wasserstein, and Kendra Wells. An anthology focused on campaign two NPCs, Critical Role: The Mighty Nein – Stories Untold, is scheduled for release on August 11, 2026. It features a foreword by Taliesin Jaffe, and stories written by Betsy Aoki, Kiri Callaghan, Dani Carr, Mae Catt, Mike Chen, Rin Chupeco, Nino Cipri, Nadia El-Fassi, and Chase K.

A fairy-tale collection, Critical Role: Der Katzenprinz & Other Zemnian Tales, written by Liam O'Brien and illustrated by Charlie Borovsky, was released on April 8, 2025. It is based on in-universe books from campaign two.

The romantasy novel Tusk Love by Thea Guazon was released on July 1, 2025. It is based on the "fictional smutty romance" Tusk Love novel that "started off as an inside joke" during campaign two. DW McKinney, for Publishers Weekly, highlighted that the Tusk Love cover is part of the "interspecies embraces" trend in romance cover design. Additionally, it has a reversible cover jacket – "Erion Makuo created the outer jacket, meant to appeal to romantasy readers; Joanna Johnen, who has illustrated assets for Critical Role in the past, did the inner jacket, designed to resemble an in-world object for fans of the series". It was #4 on Publishers Weekly's "Best-selling Books Week of July 13, 2025" in "Hardcover Fiction". MJ Franklin of The New York Times stated that Tusk Love "sold close to 10,000 copies in its first week, according to NPD BookScan. In mid-July, it landed at No. 4 on the New York Times hardcover fiction best-seller list".

A novel set after the second campaigns, Critical Role: The Mighty Nein – Children of Empire (2026) by Nibedita Sen, is scheduled for release on November 10, 2026. It will focus on the actions of Caleb and Beau in the leadup to the third campaign.

=== Other ===
The World of Critical Role: The History Behind the Epic Fantasy
- Author: Liz Marsham, the cast of Critical Role
- Audio read by: Mary Elizabeth McGlynn, Felicia Day
- Publisher: Ten Speed Press
- Publication date: October 20, 2020
- Pages: 288
- ISBN: 978-0-593-15743-5

On October 20, 2020, the coffee table book The World of Critical Role: The History Behind the Epic Fantasy by Liz Marsham was released. In The New York Times Best Seller list for November 8, 2020, the book was #9 in "Advice, How-To & Miscellaneous". In USA Today's "Top 150 Weekly Best Sellers", The World of Critical Role: The History Behind the Epic Fantasy debuted at #37 on October 29, 2020. James Grebey, for SyFy Wire, wrote: "In addition to recounting Critical Role's early days (although not a full history — longtime Critters will probably be unsurprised to know that controversial moments like original castmember Orion Acaba's exit are largely glossed over), The World of Critical Role offers insights into why the cast made their characters make certain decisions during iconic moments from the campaigns, and it explains how the real-life biographies of the cast influenced their character creation."

Exquisite Exandria: The Official Cookbook of Critical Role
- Author: Liz Marsham, Jesse Szewczyk, Susan Vu, Amanda Yee
- Publisher: Random House Worlds
- Publication date: August 29, 2023
- Pages: 224
- ISBN: 978-0-593-157046

In August 2023, Critical Role released a cookbook, titled Exquisite Exandria: The Official Cookbook of Critical Role (2023), written by Marsham with recipe contributions by Jesse Szewczyk, Susan Vu, and Amanda Yee. It was #5 on Publishers Weekly's "Best-selling Books Week of September 3, 2023" in "Hardcover Nonfiction". In USA Today's "Top 150 Weekly Best Sellers", the cookbook debuted at #25 on September 6, 2023. In The New York Times Best Seller list for September 17, 2023, the cookbook was #7 in "Advice, How-To & Miscellaneous".

Randy Gregory II, for Gaming Trend, opined that it was the "best themed cookbook" he has read and that the dishes of Exquisite Exandria are carefully curated to "feel correct within their respective regions of Exandria" and grounded in the fictional geographic lore with "a level of seriousness" seen in "fancy cultural cookbooks that dive into the specific regions". He wrote that the "recipes are written exceptionally well thanks to Liz Marsham and her staff of recipe writers and food stylists" and that "everything in the recipes is represented in both imperial units and grams, along with notes for alternative/optional ingredients". Andrew Stretch of TechRaptor called Exquisite Exandria "a really good cookbook" with a wide range of recipes. Stretch felt that the fictional continental history and food origins was "more like reading a Dungeons & Dragons sourcebook". He commented that "one of the only somewhat frustrating aspects" of the cookbook is the organization of food by fictional continent so "when you're looking for a certain recipe, it could be anywhere".

== Comics ==
Geek & Sundry produced a six-panel series of webcomics weekly from November to December 2015 that describes a "Winter's Crest Festival" that occurred pre-series. The webcomics were written by cast members Ray and Jaffe, and feature artwork by Wendy Sullivan Green.

=== Critical Role: Vox Machina Origins ===
On July 22, 2017, at the 2017 San Diego Comic-Con, it was announced that a comic book that covers the beginning of Vox Machina pre-stream and pre-game would be published by Dark Horse Comics. The first issue was published digitally in September 2017. A hardcover collection of the first volume was released on May 31, 2018; the trade paperback was then released on October 15, 2019. In July 2019, issue one of the second volume was released digitally and in print; the collected trade paperback was released on August 12, 2020. The creative team of the second volume returned for the third volume with the first issue released in February 2021.

Volume	Issues	Creative team	Publication date		Ref.
1	6	Matthew Colville, Matthew Mercer (writers), Olivia Samson (illustrator), Chris Northrop (colors & letters)	September 20, 2017	April 18, 2018	
2	6	Jody Houser, Matthew Mercer (writers), Olivia Samson (illustrator), MSASSYK (colors), Ariana Maher (letters)	July 10, 2019	June 3, 2020	
3	6	Jody Houser, Matthew Mercer (writers), Olivia Samson (illustrator), MSASSYK, Diana Sousa (colors), Ariana Maher (letters)	February 10, 2021	May 18, 2022	
4	6	Jody Houser, Matthew Mercer (writers), Noah Hayes (illustrator), Diana Sousa (colors), Ariana Maher (letters)	May 29, 2024	April 2, 2025	

=== Critical Role: The Tales of Exandria ===
In December 2020, it was announced that a comic anthology exploring the side stories of NPCs would be published by Dark Horse Comics. The first miniseries concentrates on Leylas Kryn, the Bright Queen of the Kryn Dynasty, and her eternal lover Quana. The series was written in consultation with Mercer.

Volume	Issues	Title	Creative team	Publication date		Ref.
Released
1	4	Critical Role: The Tales of Exandria – The Bright Queen	Darcy Van Poelgeest (writer), CoupleofKooks (illustrator), Cris Peter (colors), Ariana Maher (letters)	October 20, 2021	March 9, 2022	
2	4	Critical Role: The Tales of Exandria – Artagan	Matthew Mercer, Sam Maggs (writers), Aviv Or (illustrator), Cris Peter (colors), Ariana Maher (letters)	January 3, 2024	July 10, 2024	

=== Critical Role: The Mighty Nein Origins ===
In November 2020, Critical Role announced that a graphic novel series exploring the backstories of the main characters would be published by Dark Horse Comics. Each book has a different creative team and was released as a hardcover. In December 2021, Dark Horse announced that many of the titles in the series would have a delayed release date due to a mixture of circumstances. Eight volumes were published between 2021 and 2024. An omnibus – titled Critical Role: The Mighty Nein Origins Library Edition Volume 1 – collecting the Jester Lavorre, Caleb Widogast, Yasha Nydoorin, and Nott the Brave stories was released in October 2023. The second library edition volume, collecting the Mollymauk Tealeaf, Beauregard Lionett, Fjord Stone and Caduceus Clay stories, was released in December 2024. The Mighty Nein Origins is also scheduled to be adapted for the digital vertical scroll format on Webtoon.

Brian Hibbs, in The Beat's analysis of 2022 comics sales, highlighted that Critical Role: The Mighty Nein Origins–Caleb Widogast was one of eight Dark Horse titles in the "Top 750" and that it was Dark Horse's 4th best selling title with 15,000 copies sold. Colorist Diana Sousa was nominated for the 2023 Eisner Award in "Best Coloring" for her work on Critical Role: Vox Machina Origins, The Mighty Nein Origins: Yasha Nydoorin, The Mighty Nein Origins: Fjord Stone, and The Mighty Nein Origins: Caleb Widogast.

=== The Legend of Vox Machina: The Whitestone Chronicles ===
In February 2023, Dark Horse, with Critical Role and Amazon Studios, announced a new interconnected prequel graphic novel series for the animated show The Legend of Vox Machina. The series will be written by Marieke Nijkamp with art by Tyler Walpole; the first book, The Legend of Vox Machina: The Whitestone Chronicles – Ripley, was published in December 2024. The second volume, The Legend of Vox Machina: The Whitestone Chronicles – Cassandra, is scheduled for release in March 2026.

Title	Creative team	Publication date	Ref.
Released
The Legend of Vox Machina: The Whitestone Chronicles – Ripley	Marieke Nijkamp (writer), Tyler Walpole (illustrator)	December 3, 2024	
Upcoming
The Legend of Vox Machina: The Whitestone Chronicles – Cassandra	Marieke Nijkamp (writer), Travis Hymel (illustrator), Diana Sousa (colors), Comicraft (letters)	March 10, 2026	

== Licensed collectibles ==
In 2019, Critical Role announced it had "entered into licensing agreements with Funko, McFarlane Toys, Penguin random house, and Ripple Junction".

=== Funko Pop! ===
In fall 2020, Funko Pop figures based on the main Vox Machina characters were released. Christian Hoffer, for ComicBook.com, wrote, "The figures should delight any Critical Role fan, with small nods and touches to Vox Machina's long history. [...] Funko previously released a special 'Vex on Broom' figure earlier this summer that was made available only at Best Buy and quickly sold out [...]. These new figures are the first 'mass release' Funko Pop! figures and should be hot sellers". Gavin Sheehan, for Bleeding Cool, wrote, "Overall, the Critical Role set is a mighty fine one. There are times we look at Funko figures and we see that they basically just took the design skin of something, [...] and just slapped that design on the standard figure and walked away without any attention to detail. On each of these you can see they worked with the cast to make sure they were as accurate as they could make them within the Funko design. Detailed enough for fans to appreciate, which makes them well worth the money spent on whichever ones you decide to get".

=== McFarlane Toys ===
In July 2020, a 12-inch action figure of Mollymauk Tealeaf from McFarlane Toys was released. CBR highlighted that the figure is a limited-edition.

== Licensed miniature figures ==
=== Steamforged Games ===
In July 2018, Steamforged Games (SFG) raised approximately $1.2M in a Kickstarter campaign for a collection of licensed miniature figures based on player characters (PCs) and non-player characters (NPCs) from the first two Critical Role campaigns. The Kickstarter campaign included miniatures of both Vox Machina and the Mighty Nein, and exclusive miniatures of Taryon Darrington, Doty, Pumat Prime, and three Pumat Sols. Because Caduceus was not part of the Mighty Nein until after the SFG Kickstarter campaign finished he is not included in the Mighty Nein set of figures.

In a February 2019 update, backers were informed that the expected March 2019 fulfilment date would be missed, as quality control samples had failed to meet both SFG's and the Critical Role cast's standards. The miniatures began shipping to backers June 2019. The line was added to various online and hobby stores shortly after, but has since been discontinued.

A Caduceus miniature was announced as part of SFG's continuing "Vault" line of Critical Role miniature figures in July 2019. The Vault line are limited edition figures, which are produced in resin at lower volumes than the PVC figures in the Kickstarter campaign. A new Caduceus miniature was released in October 2020. This new design is also produced by SFG. Unlike their previous Caduceus miniature from SFG's Vault line; this version has been produced in PVC, and is not stated to be limited edition.

=== WizKids ===
In January 2021, Critical Role announced a partnership with WizKids to create Wildemount themed miniatures. The announced boxsets are: Monsters of Wildemount Set I, Monsters of Wildemount Set II, Monsters of Wildemount Udaak premium figure, Factions of Wildemount – Dwendalian Empire, Factions of Wildemount – Kryn Dynasty & Xhorhas, Factions of Wildemount – Clovis Concord & Menagerie Coast. WizKids stated that the initial boxsets would be released in Spring 2021 at local game stores worldwide. WizKids has since released additional boxsets such as Guests of Critical Role, NPCs of Tal' Dorei Set I & II, NPCs of Wildemount, and Bells Hells. Upcoming boxsets scheduled to be released in 2023 include Monsters of Wildemount Set III, Vox Machina, and The Mighty Nein.

== Tabletop games ==
=== Campaign setting books ===
On August 8, 2016, Green Ronin Publishing announced that it had signed a licensing agreement with Geek & Sundry to release a roleplaying game sourcebook series set in the world of Exandria, written by Mercer and based on the Dungeons & Dragons 5th edition rules via the Wizards of the Coast Open Game License. Only one book was published with Green Ronin—Critical Role: Tal'Dorei Campaign Setting—and it is set on the continent of Tal'Dorei where most of Vox Machina's adventures take place. The hardback edition was released at Gen Con 2017 on August 17, 2017, while the PDF version was released on July 17, 2017. The book is now out of print — a revised edition, titled Tal'Dorei Campaign Setting Reborn, was released by Darrington Press on January 18, 2022. Tal'Dorei Campaign Setting Reborn was the Gold Winner for the 2022 ENNIE Awards in the "Best Setting" category.

On January 13, 2020, Wizards of the Coast and Critical Role announced the launch of the second book: Explorer's Guide to Wildemount. The campaign sourcebook was released on March 17, 2020. Over the course of two years, Mercer collaborated with Wizards of the Coast to develop the sourcebook which includes a new source of magic, dunamancy, that is featured in the second campaign.

=== Roleplaying modules ===
In March 2020, Critical Role released a special one-shot episode to promote the release of Doom Eternal. The special was adapted and published as a tie-in Dungeons & Dragons module entitled Assault on Amaros Station. The game was written by Christopher Lockey and Matthew Mercer, and received a digital release via the Critical Role store on December 16, 2020.

On October 12, 2021, Wizards of the Coast and Critical Role announced a new adventure module titled Critical Role: Call of the Netherdeep with Mercer, James Haeck and Chris Perkins as lead designers. It is scheduled to be released on March 15, 2022. The adventure starts in the Wastes of Xhorhas before players head to the city of Ank'Harel (on the continent of Marquet); from there, players will be drawn into the Netherdeep "a terrifying cross between the Far Realm and the deep ocean".

=== Collectable card game ===
In 2024, two Critical Role-themed Challenger Series decks where released for the collectible card game UniVersus. The "Critical Role Challenger Series: Vox Machina" deck focuses on the twins Vax and Vex from the Vox Machina campaign. The Mighty Nein-based deck – "Critical Role Challenger Series: Vox Machina" – is focused on Nott and Jester. A full set (i.e. a set that includes booster packs) called Heroes of Exandria was released in March 2025.

=== Other games ===
A licensing agreement with The Op to produce Critical Role themed games was announced in March 2020. Two 1000 piece puzzles were then released in fall 2020; the puzzles are themed around each campaign's respective party and feature art by fan artist Lauren Walsh. In March 2021, a Critical Role themed version of Munchkin was released. Cass Marshall, for Polygon, wrote, "Munchkin: Critical Role keeps the general structure of the core game, with plenty of room for back-and-forth card exchanges and battles, but it is otherwise very much a Critical Role adaptation that stands alone as its own game". William Cennamo, for Screen Rant, wrote, "fans of Critical Role will get quite a kick out of playing as their favorite characters from the show, and the simplistic gameplay style of Munchkin makes for an easy starting point into more modern board and card games. However, fans of Munchkin that are looking for something new and fresh may be disappointed by the simplistic reskin of every other Munchkin version out there".

== Video games ==
Critical Role characters and items have appeared in the following video game titles:

- Pillars of Eternity II: Deadfire (2018), an RPG developed by Obsidian, received a free DLC entitled Critical Role Pack. The set was released on the launch day for the main game, and added additional character voices and portraits. The set corresponds with eight characters from the first campaign, making up the bulk of Vox Machina, and are voiced by the original cast.
- Idle Champions of the Forgotten Realms (2018) added the characters Arkhan the Cruel and Spurt the Kobold in 2019. Arkhan's inclusion was announced on Talks Machina as part of a sponsorship deal.
- Among Us (2018) featured cosmetic items from all three campaigns as part of a Gilmore's Curious Cosmicube event in 2024.
- Wayfinder (2024) received a DLC entitled the Critical Role Supporter Pack, featuring outfits and other cosmetic items based on Vox Machina.
- Assassin's Creed Shadows (2025) received a free story DLC, entitled A Critical Encounter, which features a character created by Robbie Daymond for the sponsored Assassin's Creed themed one-shot episode. A Critical Role-themed weapon pack was also added to the game's store.

Additionally, Mercer's "How do you want to do this?" catchphrase was added as a voice line to his character, Cassidy, in the season five battle pass of the video game Overwatch 2 in 2023.

In July 2025, Critical Role announced that a video game set in Exandria was in early development through a partnership with AdHoc Studio.

== Subsidiaries ==
=== Darrington Press ===
In October 2020, Critical Role announced a "new board and card game" imprint called Darrington Press; it is led by Ivan Van Norman with Mercer as the creative advisor. Van Norman has stated: "At this time, Darrington Press is not looking to utilize crowdfunding for any game releases". Games will be set both inside and outside of the Exandria setting. The imprint's first "State of the Press" in April 2023 released updates on both previously announced games and revealed new games in development; this included two new roleplaying game systems which are scheduled to have a public play test during Gen Con 2023.

=== Scanlan Shorthalt Music ===
In June 2022, Critical Role launched a new record label, Scanlan Shorthalt Music, to release original music inspired by Critical Role and the Exandria setting. Along with the label announcement, they released their first album titled Welcome to Tal'Dorei. The new project is led by Ray and Senior Producer Maxwell James. In November 2022, the label released a second album titled Welcome to Wildemount.
