= Critical Role: The Mighty Nein – The Nine Eyes of Lucien =

2022 fantasy novel by Madeleine Roux

- Cover art by Matt Hubel
- Author: Madeleine Roux
- Audio read by: Robbie Daymond; Cast of Critical Role
- Language: English
- Genre: Fantasy literature
- Set in: Exandria
- Published: November 1, 2022
- Publisher: Random House Worlds
- Publication place: United States
- Media type: Print (Hardcover), Ebook, Audiobook
- Pages: 320
- ISBN: 9780593496732

Critical Role: The Mighty Nein – The Nine Eyes of Lucien is a 2022 fantasy novel by Madeleine Roux. It is based on the web series Critical Role; the novel focuses on Lucien, the tiefling antagonist of campaign two, and his life before and after he met the Mighty Nein.

== Premise ==
The novel focuses on the backstory of Lucien, the tiefling antagonist of Critical Role's second campaign, following him growing up in Shadycreek Run, his training as a Blood Hunter and the quest that led him to become the villainous Nonagon. The novel continues through Lucien's life to his ultimate demise at the hands of the Mighty Nein, an adventuring party.

== Publication history ==
The novel, Critical Role: The Mighty Nein – The Nine Eyes of Lucien by Madeleine Roux, was released on November 1, 2022. The novel's characters were introduced in the second campaign of the web series Critical Role. It is the second novel from the brand and the first to focus on a villain. It was released as a hardcover, an ebook and an audiobook. The audiobook is narrated by Robbie Daymond, with the cast of Critical Role reprising their roles from the second campaign.

Madison Durham, for Polygon, highlighted that Taliesin Jaffe's character Mollymauk Tealeaf occupied the body of Lucien during the web series and that "multiple non-player characters in the game world mistook Jaffe's character for Lucien". However, following the death and burial of Mollymauk, the Mighty Nein discovered that Lucien had returned and inhabited "the newly resurrected body, now played by Matthew Mercer as an NPC. Initially Lucien shared elements of Mollymauk's personality, but it quickly became apparent that he was a different person entirely. He was ruthless, cruel, and arrogant. The player characters' interactions with him were accordingly fraught, as they were forced to weigh the atrocity of Lucien's actions against the preciousness of his body".

Roux, on the connection between Lucien and Mollymauk, stated that:

I don't think you can do it correctly if you don't take into account that this person is an amalgamation of these different souls that end up inhabiting this one body. And what would that do to you, and does that mean that there's crossover? You try slipping in juicy little hints here and there. Maybe they're all meshed together in some sense — or maybe when the spell was cast they were broken apart.

Roux wanted to show Lucien's development as villain without it being an apology for his actions. Roux also commented that unlike many brand projects the goal wasn't to play it safe – she stated that she thinks "this is the most experimental and riskiest IP book that has been published to date, that has a brand name on it".

== Reception ==
In Publishers Weekly's "Best-selling Books Week Ending November 12, 2022", Critical Role: The Mighty Nein – The Nine Eyes of Lucien was #25 in "Hardcover Fiction" with 4,108 units sold.

Steve Dunk, for Cinelinx, commented on the difficulties of good IP writing and stated that "the best compliment I can give The Mighty Nein – The Nine Eyes of Lucien, is that despite all the knowables, despite the unavoidably foreseeable nature of the book, I found myself anticipating and enjoying what was happening next, page after page after page". Dunk felt that Roux didn't shy away from Lucien being a villainous character and didn't paint "Lucien as a sympathetic character". Dunk also highlighted the back half of the novel which focuses on Lucien's transmutation where he experiences "fragmented visions, bizarre all-to-real dreams, and a chorus of auditory Somnovem stiffs" – "Roux has a bit of fun here when it comes to the work on the page, using erratic schizophrenic type of layouts (and pretty great interludes), depicting a person nimbly transforming into a madman. As a practicality and favor to us, she also uses different fonts to show the 9+ voices Lucien hears, letting us in on the madness that lies just beneath the surface".

Kat Bloodgood, for That Hashtag Show, rated the book as 100% and called the novel "fascinating" and "perfect for anyone who has seen the 2nd campaign, or for those who want some insight into the character of Lucien". On Lucien, she commented that the novel examines the "innerworkings" [sic] of the character and that the "villain's story doesn't always have to be black and white. It can be complex and interesting, and still very grounded in storytelling". Bloodgood also highlighted that "throughout the book, there were sections that had extra story pieces alongside what was already written in that specific chapter. And there are a lot of these placed throughout the entire book. What this does is essentially add a whole extra layer of storytelling into the book, which I love about this new book".

The Nine Eyes of Lucien appeared on the 2024 Game Rant "31 Best Dungeons & Dragons Novels, Ranked" list at #7.

== See also ==
- Critical Role–related products
