= Critical Role: Vox Machina Origins =

American comic series

Vox Machina
- Trade paperback cover art by Stjepan Sejic

Group publication information
- Publisher: Dark Horse Comics
- First appearance: Critical Role: Vox Machina – Origins vol. 1 #1 (September 2017)
- Created by: Matthew Mercer; Cast of Critical Role

In-story information
- Type of organization: Adventuring party
- Agent(s): Vax'ildan "Vax" Vessar; Vex'ahlia "Vex" Vessar; Keyleth of the Air Ashari; Scanlan Shorthalt; Grog Strongjaw; Tiberius Stormwind; Pike Trickfoot; Percival "Percy" Fredrickstein von Musel Klossowski de Rolo III

Critical Role: Vox Machina Origins

Series publication information
- Schedule: Irregular
- Format: Limited series
- Genre: Fantasy; Dungeons & Dragons
- Publication date: September 2017 – May 2025
- Number of issues: 24

Creative team
- Writer(s): Matthew Colville (vol. 1); Jody Houser (vol. 2–4)
- Artist(s): Olivia Samson (vol. 1–3); Noah Hayes (vol. 4)
- Letterer(s): Chris Northrop (vol. 1); Ariana Maher (vol. 2–4)
- Colorist(s): Chris Northrop (vol. 1); MSASSYK (vol. 2–3); Diana Sousa (vol. 3–4)
- Creator(s): Matthew Mercer; Cast of Critical Role
- Editor(s): F. Avedon-Arcadio Barrera II (vol. 1); Rachel Roberts (vol. 1–2); Jenny Blenk (vol. 1–2)

Critical Role: Vox Machina Origins is a comic series, published by Dark Horse Comics, based on the American Dungeons & Dragons web series Critical Role. The comics act as a prequel story and covers how the characters became the adventuring party known as Vox Machina before the events of the web series. Matthew Colville was the writer on the first volume with Jody Houser becoming the writer on the subsequent three volumes. Olivia Samson was the artist on the first three volumes with Noah Hayes becoming the artist on the fourth volume.

The first six issues were published digitally, starting in September 2017, followed by print collections of the issues released in May 2018 and October 2019. A second set of six issues followed in 2019, both digitally and in print, and was also collected into a printed volume in August 2020. A third volume, with six issues released both digitally and in print, was published in 2021 with its print collection following in November 2022. A fourth volume, with six issues released both digitally and in print, was published from May 2024 to May 2025 with its print collection following in November 2025.

== Plot summary ==
=== Volume 1 ===
The half-elven rogue Vax'ildan and the ranger Vex'ahlia, his twin sister, are investigating the swamp near the city of Stilben on behalf of peasant residents who believe a curse is responsible for killing their children. After they battle shark-speakers, a squirrel reveals itself to be the half-elven druid Keyleth who then heals Vax. Keyleth is also investigating the swamp, on behalf of a sorcerer friend, to verify if the swamp is being poisoned rather than cursed. The twins return to the city to track down the alchemist who informed the peasants that the swamp was cursed. The alchemist heads to a meeting; Iselda steps out of a mirror and informs him that she'll take care of the people following him. In a nearby ally, the twins fend off an attack.

The gnome bard Scanlan and the goliath barbarian Grog, along with other mercenaries, successfully raid a fish-god temple and return to Stilben to have an alchemist identify a potion they recovered. Upon arrival to the alchemist's shop, the group is attacked and a member is killed. Later, after recounting their tale at a tavern, they are approached by the dragonborn sorcerer Tiberius who identifies the potion as a type of poison used by an assassins guild based in Wildemount and buys the vial. Keyleth and Tiberius attend a meeting where their group is given twelve hours by the Clasp, a criminal guild, to identify what is killing the peasants; Keyleth and Tiberius spilt off to investigate on their own. Each pair manages to track down the alchemist hiding in a sewer lair at the same time, leading them to attack each other before grouping together to fend off an attack from the alchemist's allies. While initially successful, the group is attacked by Iselda who ambushes them by stepping out of a mirror; she seriously damages the group before fleeing through the mirror with the alchemist. Tiberius identifies her as a member of the Myriad, a Wildemount crime syndicate.

After healing up, each pair splits up again. Vax is then kidnapped by Iselda; Vex seeks help from both Scanlan and Grog's group and Tiberius and Keyleth's group. Neither group can help, so Vex storms off but Keyleth follows after and joins Vex who retrieves her pet bear Trinket. Vex, Keyleth, Tiberius, Scanlan and Grog converge on the docks as a nearby ship explodes; Vax has managed to escape on his own. As a group, they storm the ship and discover that both a poison and a ritual spell are being used to harm the swamp the peasants depend on. After creatively diluting the spell, they are attacked by Iselda who transforms into a fiend. While almost being overwhelmed, Grog kills Iselda and the group decides to get to know one another.

=== Volume 2 ===
Following another successful job in Stilben, the party celebrates in a tavern; in the middle of the night, Grog has a vision of his father and leaves. At breakfast, the group realize that Grog is missing and the twins learn from the city guard that a goliath with an ax left at dawn heading towards Westruun. They decide to go after Grog except for Tiberius who splits off to pursue research in the Ashen Gorge, the opposite direction. Their investigation in Westruun leads them to the home of the gnome cleric Pike and her great-great-grandfather Wilhand Trickfoot. Pike informs them that Grog is a childhood friend; Pike then channels her god, the Everlight, and scries on Grog. Her spell reveals that Grog is in a nearby mountain known for madness and she decides to join the group to rescue him.

On their journey, Pike tells the party that Grog protected Wilhand from a group of half-giants, including Grog's uncle, who then proceeded to beat Grog to near death. Wilhand and Pike took Grog in and nursed him back to health. Inside the mountain, the group discover a tattered shadow skeletal creature, Drath Mephrun, who has magically ensnared Grog along with a bunch of skeletons, including Grog's father. They beat the creature, rescue Grog who is left with an itchy scar, and then bury Grog's father. Back in Westruun, they look for help to heal Grog's scar; however, at the Temple Ward, they are informed Lady Kima of Vord is away on pilgrimage and at Greystone Tower, they are informed that Realmseer Eskil Ryndarien has a nine week long waitlist. Regrouping at a tavern, they are approached by Drez Vina, a representative of the Realmseer's rival, who offers them a way into his tower if the group agrees to steal an object from the tower.

After agreeing, the group infiltrate the mage tower; the group's behavior and discussion (including the decision to not steal the object) intrigue Eskil who then identifies Grog's scar as a curse that will allow Drath Mephrun to return via a makeshift lichdom ritual. Eskil can cure Grog but only if the group splits up to retrieve two components. Vex, Vax, and Grog head to the Frostweald Forest to retrieve the heart of a nymph. Overcoming basilisks, they reach the nymph's sanctuary; while the twins discuss a plan of action, Grog walks up to the nymph who then whisks him away via portal and then returns him to the sanctuary with a nymph's heart. Pike, Scanlan, and Keyleth head to the Umbra Hills to retrieve the skull of a nightmare. In Jorenn Village, their investigation leads them to a local jail where they discover gunslinger Percival Fredrickstein von Musel Klossowski de Rolo III. Percy was pursuing a doctor who was meeting a local cult; the cult plans on summoning a nightmare. Subsequent a jailbreak, Percy helps them fight the cult, kill the nightmare and then joins the group. Upon regrouping, Eskil begins the ritual but Grog is possessed by Drath Mephrun. The group successfully fight to keep Grog in the ritual circle until Eskil destroys the near-lich. Eskil informs them that they now owe him a favor; later in the tavern, Drez Vina informs the group that they now owe his master a favor for failing at the job.

== Publication history ==
=== Creative origins ===
Critical Role began as a private Dungeons & Dragons game with Matthew Mercer as the Dungeon Master and creator of the Exandria setting. Each cast member created their own character to play in the campaign. When Geek & Sundry moved "the group's existing home game into its studio" as a weekly web series in 2015, the story of Vox Machina started in medias res. Prior to the publication of Vox Machina: Origins, most information on the group's adventures pre-stream came from a short video summary. Critical Role: Vox Machina Origins is an adaptation of the group's game before the show.

=== Volume 1 ===
In July 2017, at the 2017 San Diego Comic-Con, it was announced that a comic covering the origin of Vox Machina would be published. It was written by Matthew Colville, drawn by Olivia Samson (a long-time member of the Critical Role community), and both colored and lettered by Chris Northrop. In September 2017, Geek & Sundry announced that they partnered with Dark Horse Comics to publish the comic book and that it would be available digitally beginning September 2017. The first digital issue was released on September 20, 2017 with a cover by Deborah Hauber.

On May 31, 2018, two hardcover editions collecting Critical Role: Vox Machina Origins #1–#6 were released. Both editions include annotated cover process pieces, preliminary character sketches, and character descriptions with stats. The limited edition is bound in faux leather and came with a lithograph and cloth portfolio, all housed in a faux leather slipcase. The limited edition is now out of print. A trade paperback, Critical Role: Vox Machina Origins Volume 1 was released on October 15, 2019. In February 2025, as part of Critical Role's 10th anniversary, Dark Horse announced that the first volume would be released as print single issues starting in June 2025.

=== Volume 2 ===
Following successful sales of the first mini-series, Dark Horse announced on March 11, 2019 that a second volume, also of six issues, would continue the Vox Machina Origins story. The second volume was released as a print comic instead of a digital first comic. Critical Role: Vox Machina Origins Volume 2 was written by Jody Houser, drawn by Olivia Samson, colored by MSASSYK, lettered by Ariana Maher, and published by Dark Horse Comics. In an interview, Houser said, "I have an outline from the Critical Role folks. They do give notes on each issue to make sure character voices/details and other elements such as the way spells work are consistent. It's a collaborative process.

Issue one was released digitally and in print on July 10, 2019. The six issues were collected as a trade paperback that released on August 12, 2020. A hardcover limited edition collecting these issues was also released on August 18, 2020 with a faux-leather cover and slipcase along with a lithograph art print.

On June 15, 2020, an omnibus hardcover edition collecting the first two volumes of Critical Role: Vox Machina Origins was announced. Critical Role: Vox Machina Origins Library Edition Vol. 1 was published by Dark Horse Comics and released first in comic book stores on November 11, 2020, and then followed with a wide release on November 24, 2020. On Women Write About Comics, reviewer Nola Pfau called the omnibus "MASSIVE. It's larger than a comic, it's larger even than a D&D book. It's 12¼” tall, 9¼” wide, and 1¼” thick, three hundred and twenty glossy, thick pages, and it weighs…look, I dunno, a ton? I feel like I could do arm curls with it to tone my biceps."

=== Volume 3 ===
In June 2020, ComicBook reported that on the last page of the final issue of Critical Role: Vox Machina Origins Volume 2 there was a small textbox that promised "the adventures would continue in Vox Machina Origins Series 3." In September 2020, it was announced that the creative team of the second volume – writer Houser and artist Samson – would return for the third volume and that the first issue would be released on December 9, 2020. However, the release was delayed and the first issue was released on February 10, 2021. MSASSYK returned as the colorist on the first issue with Diana Sousa as the colorist on the subsequent issues.

A trade paperback, collecting the volume's six issues, was scheduled to be released on November 2, 2022. A hardcover limited edition collecting these issues was also set to be released on November 2, 2022 with a faux-leather cover and slipcase along with a lithograph art print. It had a wide release in December 2022.

=== Volume 4 ===
The fourth volume was announced in January 2024 – the first issue of this six issue miniseries was released on May 29, 2024. Houser, Sousa, and Maher are returning as writer, colorist and letterer, respectively, with new artist Noah Hayes. The sixth and final issue was released on May 28, 2025. A trade paperback, collecting the volume's six issues, released on November 4, 2025. A hardcover limited edition collecting these issues was also released in November 2025 with a faux-leather cover and slipcase along with a lithograph art print.

=== Webtoon ===
In July 2026, it was announced that Vox Machina Origins would be adapted for the digital vertical scroll format on Webtoon. This version's release is scheduled to begin in August 2026.

== Reception ==
=== Accolades and sales ===
In The New York Times Best Seller list for November 2019, Critical Role: Vox Machina Origins Volume 1 was 12th in "Graphic Books and Manga". In USA Today's Best Seller list for October 24, 2019, Critical Role: Vox Machina Origins Volume 1 was 96th. In the Diamond Comic Distributors' "Best-Selling Graphic Novels" sales list, Critical Role: Vox Machina Origins Volume 1 was 8th in October 2019 and 27th in the January 2020 list; in their "Top 500 Graphic Novels: Year 2019", the trade paperback was 57th "based on total unit sales of products invoiced". In 2019, Critical Role: Vox Machina Origins was Dark Horse's 6th best selling title with 19,000 copies sold. Academic Emily Friedman, in the book Roleplaying Games in the Digital Age: Essays on Transmedia Storytelling, Tabletop RPGs and Fandom (2021), commented that success of the first volume led to the publication of the second volume – "no small part of the success of these comics is their direct connection to the primary diegesis of the first campaign, providing access to elements of the plot that were previously unknown save to the players of the home game".

In The New York Times Best Seller list for September 2020, Critical Role: Vox Machina Origins Volume 2 was 13th in "Graphic Books and Manga". In Publishers Weekly's "Best-selling Books Week Ending August 23, 2020", Critical Role: Vox Machina Origins Volume 2 was 6th in "Trade Paperbacks". In USA Today's Best Seller list for August 27, 2020, Critical Role: Vox Machina Origins Volume 2 was 109th. In 2020, the first volume was Dark Horse's 7th best selling title with 18,000 copies sold and the second volume was Dark Horse's 10th best selling title with 17,000 copies sold; the library edition containing both volumes sold "around 9600 copies". Brian Hibbs, in The Beat's analysis of 2021 comics sales, commented that "the third big success for Dark Horse in licensed comics is Critical Role: Vox Machina Origins, where the big hardcover of Series 1 & 2 comes in as their #9 best-seller with almost 17k sold". In December 2022, Jody Houser was 13th on NPD BookScan's "Top 20 Author Graphic Novels" for Critical Role: Vox Machina Origins Volume 3.

Colorist Diana Sousa was nominated for the "Eisner Award for Best Coloring" at the 2023 Eisner Awards for her work on Critical Role: Vox Machina Origins, The Mighty Nein Origins: Yasha Nydoorin, The Mighty Nein Origins: Fjord Stone, and The Mighty Nein Origins: Caleb Widogast.

=== Reviews ===
Critical Role: Vox Machina Origins (the first volume) was 8th on CBR's "10 Best Comic Books & Graphic Novels Any D&D Player Should Read" list. Steve Gustafson, for 411Mania, gave the first issue of Critical Role: Vox Machina Origins Volume 1 an 8 out of 10 and wrote: "Samson's art is quite nice, and complements Mercer and Colville's storytelling well. The fantasy art brings to mind a cleaner, more defined tone than a book like Saga, differentiating itself nicely. [...] All in all, Vox Machina – Origins serves as an effective jumping-off point for people who want to learn what all the Critical Role fuss is about, but it also stands strong as its own thing too. There's enough here for readers to want to keep progressing". In coverage of ComiXology's Bestseller List for April 21, 2018, Bleeding Cool highlighted that "Critical Role: Vox Machina Origins has been a huge digital success. Based on the popular roleplaying podcast, Critical Role, and only available digitally, this surprise hit has managed to beat Mister Miracle".

Cori McCreery, for WWAC, highlighted that Tiberius was written out of the prequel comic in the second volume. She wrote, "Part of the beauty of adaptations is that you can change things that no longer fit the story you want to tell. The Critical Role team had a falling out with the actor who played Tiberius, and the character wound up leaving the game pretty early on into the stream, and leaving a bit of a conundrum for adaptations like this and the upcoming cartoon. [...] So while I don't know if they're writing the character out in the comics earlier than he left the game, I do know that they do not plan to use him in the animated series, despite his being present for some of the adventures there. I'd be perfectly fine if this adaptation took a page from the medium it's part of and provides everyone with a retcon of the group's past". Christian Hoffer of ComicBook.com gave the sixth issue of Critical Role: Vox Machina Origins Volume 2 a rating of 4 out of 5 and wrote: "Critical Role's second miniseries ends in a bit of a rushed fashion, but it's still an enjoyable one and hints at greater adventures to come. [...] There's still tons of great character moments and most importantly the feeling that Vox Machina's adventures are just getting started."

Nola Pfau of WWAC compared the work of the different creative teams in her review of the library edition which collects the first two volumes – she viewed the second volume as "stronger, be that a function of Houser's experience or the fact that she had to do less team-assembling and was more free to simply jump into a story," and attributed the second volume's more female gaze to "all of the creative duties in the second arc" being "handled by women". Pfau liked Matthew Colville's "repeating motifs" and thought he did an "excellent job" at pulling "disparate stories" together; she opined that Colville's character work leaned "heavier" on Dungeons & Dragons character class archetypes than Jody Houser's. She also commented that the library edition highlights the impact of "different letterers and colorists" and that "it's not that the first arc is bad in any way, it's just that it has the unfortunate luck of being paired in this single volume with another, one that reads like a masterclass in comics work". Pfau wrote that Chris "Northrop's colors are brighter hued, vibrant greens and blues, whereas MSASSYK leeches that vibrancy out, giving everything a more dank, oppressive feel" and that while "Northrop's letters get the job done", Ariana "Maher's lettering work is tighter, more precise [...]. It's all subtle work but it has the same effect as MSASSYK's colors, above—it's more atmospheric, it draws the reader further into the story".

Hoffer, for ComicBook, also gave the first issue of Critical Role: Vox Machina Origins Volume 3 a rating of 4 out of 5 and wrote: "After Vox Machina spends away their latest earnings on various pleasures (the montage is one of the best parts of these comics so far and perfectly captures the personalities of the team), the group is recruited for an underground fighting ring that may be more than meets the eye. Another solid comic that only requires the scantest of information about Critical Role to enjoy. This remains one of the best fantasy comics on stands today".

== Collected editions ==
Title	Material collected	Format	Publication date	Pages	ISBN	Ref
Critical Role: Vox Machina Origins Volume 1 Standard Edition	Critical Role: Vox Machina Origins #1–6	Hardcover	May 31, 2018	160		
Critical Role: Vox Machina Origins Volume 1 Limited Edition	Critical Role: Vox Machina Origins #1–6	Hardcover	May 31, 2018	160		
Critical Role: Vox Machina Origins Volume 1	Critical Role: Vox Machina Origins #1–6	Trade paperback	October 15, 2019	168	ISBN 978-1-5067-1481-3	
Critical Role: Vox Machina Origins Volume 2	Critical Role: Vox Machina Origins Series Two #1-6	Trade paperback	August 12, 2020	152	ISBN 978-1-5067-1449-3	
Critical Role: Vox Machina Origins Volume 2 Limited Edition	Critical Role: Vox Machina Origins Series Two #1-6	Hardcover	August 18, 2020	152		
Critical Role: Vox Machina Origins Series I & II Library Edition	Critical Role: Vox Machina Origins #1-6, Critical Role: Vox Machina Origins Series Two #1-6	Hardcover	November 11, 2020	320	ISBN 978-1-5067-2173-6	
Critical Role: Vox Machina Origins Volume 3	Critical Role: Vox Machina Origins Series Three #1-6	Trade paperback	November 2, 2022	152	ISBN 978-1-5067-2368-6	
Critical Role: Vox Machina Origins Volume 3 Limited Edition	Critical Role: Vox Machina Origins Series Three #1-6	Hardcover	November 2, 2022		ISBN 978-1-5067-3427-9	
Critical Role: Vox Machina Origins IV	Critical Role: Vox Machina Origins Series Four #1-6	Trade paperback	November 4, 2025	152	ISBN 9781506738352	
Critical Role: Vox Machina Origins IV Deluxe Edition	Critical Role: Vox Machina Origins Series Four #1-6	Hardcover	November 4, 2025	152	ISBN 9781506738376	
Critical Role: Vox Machina Origins Omnibus—Series I and II	Critical Role: Vox Machina Origins #1-6, Critical Role: Vox Machina Origins Series Two #1-6	Trade paperback	April 7, 2026	304	ISBN 9781506753782	
