= Madeleine Roux =

American writer

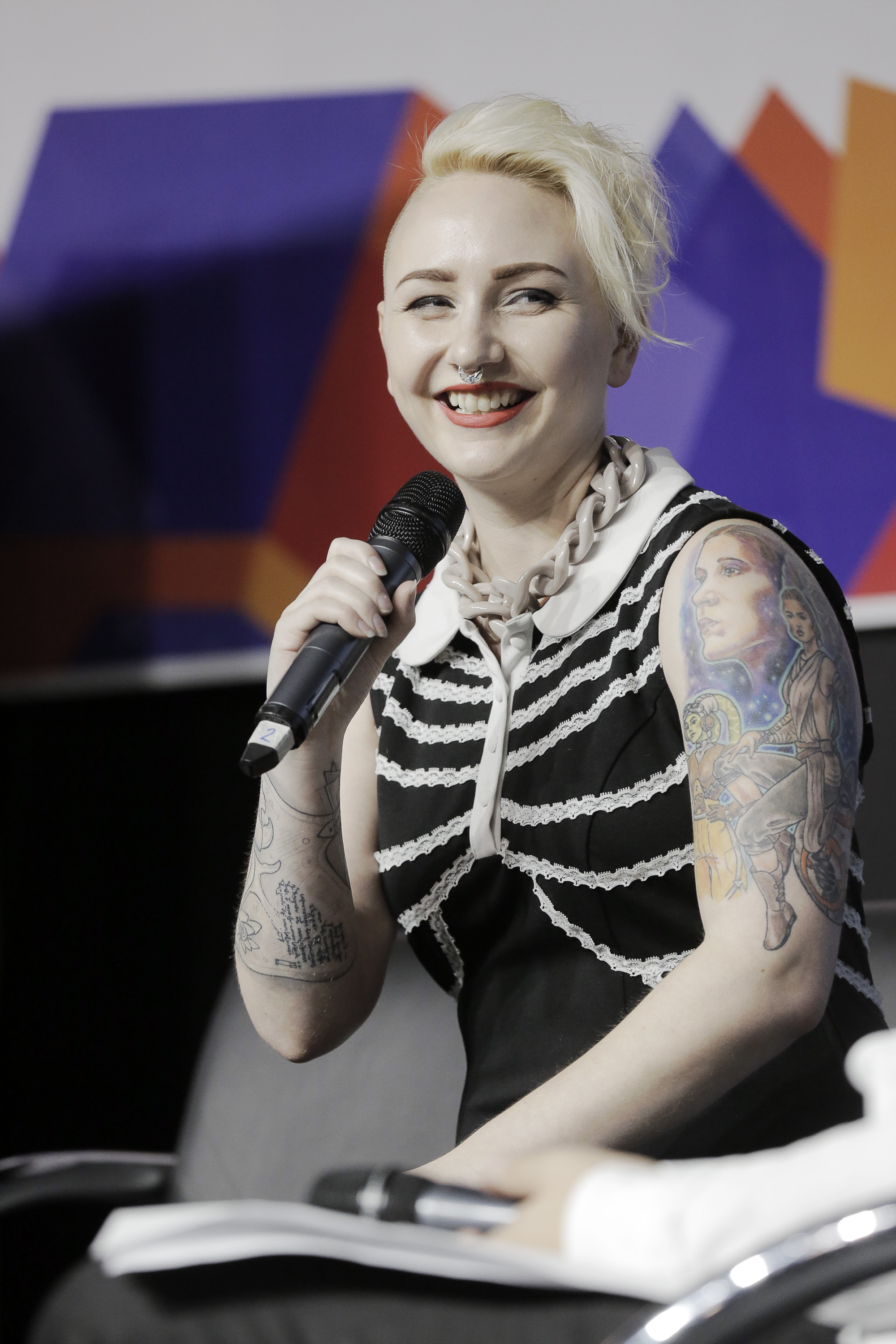
- Roux in Argentina in 2017
- Born: Minnesota, U.S.
- Other name: Diane Walker
- Education: Beloit College
- Known for: Writing
- Notable work: Asylum series
- Website: www.madeleine-roux.com

Madeleine Roux is an American fiction author. She has written several young adult paranormal and horror fiction series, including the Asylum series. She has also written two standalone adult science fiction novels along with several novels for licensed properties such as World of Warcraft and Dungeons & Dragons.

== Life and education ==
Roux was born in Minnesota. Roux attended Beloit College, where she studied creative writing and acting and graduated with a bachelor's degree in 2008.

== Career ==
=== Novels ===
Roux became known for her zombie fiction blog, Allison Hewitt Is Trapped, which she turned into her first novel by the same name. Asylum, a 2013 young adult horror novel and first installment in the series of the same name, was a New York Times bestseller.

Her next young adult trilogy began with House of Furies in 2017. Kate McKean, in a review of the novel for Publishers Weekly, wrote that Roux "brings her gothic setting to rich life in this darkly delightful (and frequently gruesome) series opener". In February 2022, the Oklahoma attorney general's office announced a list of school library books, which included House of Furies, that they were reviewing for alleged obscenity. However, Attorney General John O'Connor walked back the probe within the day.

Both of her adult science fiction thriller and mystery novels – Salvaged (2019) and Reclaimed (2021) – received starred reviews from Publishers Weekly. Paste stated that Salvaged "is not for the faint of heart" and that "there are few worse ways to go out than what Roux has imagined for humanity in Salvaged".

In March 2022, Roux published the young adult horror novel The Book of Living Secrets. The Proposition, a Regency romance novel by Roux, is scheduled to be published in August 2022. In June 2022, it was announced that Quill Tree Books had acquired Now We Hunt the Doe, a young adult fantasy novel by Roux, along with an additional untitled novel. Now We Hunt the Doe is scheduled to be published in 2024.

=== Licensed properties ===
Roux contributed the short story "Eclipse" to From a Certain Point of View, a 2017 anthology of stories in the Star Wars universe. Jennifer Roy, for CBR, commented that Roux's contribution "was the most devastating story in the collection because it showed Alderaan's fate from the point of view of Queen Breha Organa. [...] 'Eclipse' compounded the tragedy of Alderaan and made Leia's loss even more visceral".

Roux wrote two World of Warcraft novels, as well as the short story "A Moment In Verse". Shadows Rising, her second novel set in the Warcraft universe, was among Publishers Weekly bestsellers in July 2020. Roux is the author of the Dungeon Academy series, with illustrator Timothy Probert, which is a set of Dungeons & Dragons themed middle grade books; the second novel is scheduled for release in November 2022. A novel featuring characters from the series, titled Dungeons & Dragons: A Goblin Problem (2022), was published under Roux's pen name Diane Walker.

Roux is the author of a prequel novel, titled Critical Role: The Mighty Nein – The Nine Eyes of Lucien, set before Critical Role's second campaign; it was released in November 2022.

== Bibliography ==
=== Adult fiction ===
- Salvaged (Ace, 2019, ISBN 9780451491831)
- Reclaimed (Ace, 2021, ISBN 9780451491855)
- The Proposition (Dell, 2022, ISBN 9780593499375)

=== Young adult fiction ===
- The Book of Living Secrets (Quill Tree Books, 2022, ISBN 9780062941428)
- A Girl Walks into the Forest (Quill Tree Books, 2025, ISBN 9780063284845)

==== Zombie ====
- Allison Hewitt Is Trapped (St. Martin's Publishing Group, 2011, ISBN 9780312658908)
- Sadie Walker is Stranded (St. Martin's Publishing Group, 2012, ISBN 9780312658915)

==== Asylum ====
- Asylum (HarperCollins Publishers, 2013, ISBN 9780062220967)
- Sanctum (HarperCollins Publishers, 2014, ISBN 9780062220998)
- Catacomb (HarperCollins Publishers, 2015, ISBN 9780062364050)
- Escape from Asylum, prequel (HarperCollins Publishers, 2016, ISBN 9780062424433)
- The Asylum Novellas (HarperCollins Publishers, 2016, ISBN 9780312658915); collects:
  - The Scarlets, novella (2014)
  - The Bone Artists, novella (2015)
  - The Warden, novella (2016)

==== House of Furies ====
- House of Furies (HarperTeen, 2017, ISBN 9780062498618)
- Court of Shadows (HarperTeen, 2018, ISBN 9780062498700)
- Tomb of Ancients (HarperTeen, 2019, ISBN 9780062498731)

=== Licensed fiction ===
==== World of Warcraft ====
- The Shining Blade – World of Warcraft: Traveler, Book 3 (Scholastic Inc., 2019, ISBN 9781338538946)
- Shadows Rising – World of Warcraft: Shadowlands (Del Rey Books, 2020, ISBN 9780399594144)
- "A Moment in Verse", short story (2021)

==== Dungeons & Dragons ====
- Dungeon Academy: No Humans Allowed! (HarperCollins Publishers, 2021, ISBN 9780063039124)
- Dungeon Academy: Tourney of Terror (HarperCollins Publishers, 2022, ISBN 9780063039148)
- Dungeon Academy: Last Best Hope (Farshore, 2024, ISBN 978-0008642433)

==== Critical Role ====
- Critical Role: The Mighty Nein – The Nine Eyes of Lucien (Del Rey Books, 2022, ISBN 9780593496732)

==== Marvel ====
- What If. . . Loki Was Worthy?: A Loki and Valkyrie Story (Del Rey Books, 2024, ISBN 978-1529914337)

==== Star Wars ====
- "Eclipse" in From a Certain Point of View (Del Rey Books, 2017, ISBN 9780345511478)
- Star Wars: Legacy (Random House Worlds, 2026, ISBN 9780593982662)

=== Anthologies ===
- "The Tall Ones" in Don't Turn Out the Lights (HarperCollins Publishers, 2020, ISBN 9780062877673)
