= Asylum (novel series) =

Book series by Madeleine Roux

- Asylum; Sanctum; Catacomb
- Author: Madeleine Roux
- Country: Britain
- Language: English
- Genre: Young adult, horror
- Publisher: HarperTeen
- Published: 2013
- Media type: Print

Asylum is a New York Times bestselling young adult horror novel series by Madeleine Roux. The series is composed of four novels, Asylum, Sanctum, Catacomb, and Escape from Asylum and three novellas: The Scarlets, The Bone Artists, and The Warden. The series features various twists and turns.

The books feature a written story accompanied by photographs that the series' characters uncover during the course of the story.

== Premise ==
The series follows sixteen-year-old Dan Crawford, who was chosen to attend a prestigious college preparatory summer program in New Hampshire. Once there he befriends two other teens, Abby and Jordan, with whom he explores an old psychiatric hospital that has been re-purposed into a student dormitory. However, what they find ends up drawing them into old and disturbing recurring events. In the way, they will uncover the secrets that link them to the terrifying things that happen inside the Asylum walls.

This story is a warning: the mind can make bad plays when entering an underworld where nothing is what it seems and is experienced with it. There will always be consequences ... And they will not be pleasant at all.

== Synopsis ==
=== Asylum (2013) ===
Dan is a new attendee to the New Hampshire College Prep (NHCP) summer program, where he befriends two other attendees, Abby and Jordan. Abby and Dan kindle a romance, which threatens their friendship with Jordan. This becomes the least of his problems, as the trio ends up getting drawn into the past mysteries of their dorm, the Brookline Dorm, which used to serve as a psychiatric hospital. Exploring the dorm's grounds and history brings evidence that one of Abby's relatives attended the hospital and that one of Dan's relatives may have been the hospital's warden. Things grow more tense after a boy is killed at the university and Dan discovers that there was once a serial killer named "The Sculptor" that attended thanages to meet her aunt, Dan travels back home.

=== Sanctum (2014) ===
Dan and his friends have decided to return to the prep school in order to investigate the past summer's mysteries further, especially as someone is sending them creepy old pictures and GPS coordinates to abandoned houses near the Brookline Dorm. Dan is determined to explore these coordinates in order to end the torment once and for all. They discover that the carnival from the photos is hosted on campus and that's just where the horrifying story begins .

=== Catacomb (2015) ===
Dan and his friends, Abby and Jordan, decided to take a road trip the summer after senior year. On their way to visit Jordan's uncle in New Orleans, the friends realize they're being followed and photographed. Dan begins to receive messages from someone who died last Halloween and the strange occurrences only escalate once they reach New Orleans. Dan realizes that the disturbing events that have happened to him might not be coincidence, but fate. His past might be connected to a group called the Bone Artists, who are disturbingly interested in past killers. Dan just hopes he can make it out of this road trip alive with his life.

== Books ==
1. Asylum (2013)
2. Sanctum (2014)
3. Catacomb (2015)
4. Escape From Asylum: An Asylum Prequel (2016)

== Novellas ==
- The Scarlets (2014)
- The Bone Artists (2015)
- The Warden (2016)

== Characters ==
- Daniel Crawford: Sixteen-year-old boy who goes to study History at the New Hampshire College Prep for the summer. He's quiet, studious, thoughtful, and curious. He suffers from a mild form of Dissociative Disorder and is connected to the history of Brookline Asylum.
- Abby Valdez: A girl Dan's age who is studying Art at the New Hampshire College Prep for the summer. She's described as being "petite, with large brown eyes and creamy olive skin". She is Dan's love interest.
- Jordan Lipcott: A guy Abby and Dan's age who Abby meets on the ride to campus. He's described as having "broody hair and broody face and cool, broody clothes".
- Felix Sheridan: Dan's roommate at Brookline. He's described as "a lanky teenager...dressed like a door-to-door missionary in a starched white shirt, dark tie, and pleated trousers."
- The Warden (Daniel Crawford): He was the warden at Brookline when it was an asylum. His experiments focused on immortality and he was focused on spreading his "legacy".
- Dennis Heimline: Previous patient of Brookline Asylum who was a serial killer called the "Sculptor" because he posed his victims with ropes and wires. He was "cured" then disappeared after the asylum was shut down.

== Reception ==
Common Sense Media gave the first and second books in the series three stars each, writing of the second book that "Genre fans will have a good time with zombie novelist Madeleine Roux's fast-paced, spooky narrative."
