= Critical Role: Vox Machina – Kith & Kin =

2021 novel by Marieke Nijkamp

- Cover art by Nikki Dawes.
- Author: Marieke Nijkamp
- Audio read by: Laura Bailey, Robbie Daymond, Liam O'Brien
- Language: English
- Genre: Fantasy literature
- Set in: Exandria (Critical Role)
- Published: November 30, 2021
- Publisher: Del Rey Books
- Publication place: United States
- Media type: Print (Hardcover), Ebook, Audiobook
- Pages: 368
- ISBN: 978-0-593-49662-6

Critical Role: Vox Machina – Kith & Kin is a 2021 fantasy novel by Marieke Nijkamp. It is the first prequel novel based on the web series Critical Role; it focuses on the twins Vex'ahlia "Vex" and Vax'ildan "Vax" Vessar, from campaign one, three years before they joined the adventuring party Vox Machina.

== Premise ==
The novel focuses on the backstory of the half-elven twin siblings Vex'ahlia and Vax'ildan during an encounter with the criminal organization known as The Clasp that positions them on opposite sides.

== Publication history ==
The prequel novel, Critical Role: Vox Machina – Kith & Kin by Marieke Nijkamp, was originally scheduled to be released in October 2021; it was released on November 30, 2021. "This is the first fiction novel" based on the web series Critical Role; it is also the first novel to be "released by Penguin Random House's Del Rey imprint, following a 2019 licensing agreement" with Critical Role Productions.

The main characters, Vex'ahlia and Vax'ildan, were created by Laura Bailey and Liam O'Brien respectively for the first campaign of Critical Role. Bailey called the twins a "deeply ingrained" part of herself and O'Brien. O'Brien stated that "it's hard for me to think of something more central to all my memories of Critical Role than the bond between the twins. Discovering and creating their story and their friendship with Laura has been one of the greatest parts of this entire journey and I'm thrilled to dive deeper into their past together with this book".

It was released as a hardcover, an ebook and an audiobook. The audiobook is narrated by Robbie Daymond, with Bailey and O'Brien voicing their respective characters.

== Reception ==
In USA Today's "Top 150 Weekly Best Sellers", Critical Role: Vox Machina – Kith & Kin debuted at #108 on December 9, 2021. Critical Role: Vox Machina – Kith & Kin was #48 on Bustle's "The Most Anticipated Books Of November 2021" list. The novel was also included in AIPT Comics "2021 Gaming Gift Guide" list — the article states that it was released "just in time for the holiday season and makes for a great gift for fans of the series.

Jennifer Melzer, for CBR, highlighted that there are many potential entry points to campaign one through additional media, such as the comics or the animated series. Melzer emphasized that Critical Role: Vox Machina – Kith & Kin "is an enticing introduction into Critical Role" and "one of the exciting things about this book is that it can appeal to general fantasy readers, perhaps even those who have never heard of Critical Role or played D&D" so the book "makes for a perfect leaping-off point into the first campaign for newcomers". Melzer also wrote that "the author's insight into these beloved characters made the story itself feel like the reader was there in Exandria, following closely behind the twins and growing ever closer to understanding exactly how they became who they were before joining forces with Vox Machina. Bailey and O'Brien's deep love for Vex and Vax shines through in every moment, as if their voices whispered in Nijkamp's ear while penning their adventure and expanding the canon lore".

Sam Tyler, for SFBook Reviews, compared Critical Role: Vox Machina – Kith & Kin to the Dragonlance book series and commented that reading this novel was a close experience to reading the Dragonlance books, however, this novel also "felt more modern than the books of the 80s". Tyler wrote, "I have not interacted with the wider world of Critical Role before reading this book and it had no negative effect on the story. Nijkamp wrote a contained story that works for new readers. Nijkamp takes to writing fantasy within this IP brilliantly. The author has taken on all the information from the Critical Role team but brings their own sense of what makes good fantasy". Tyler highlighted the narrow focus of just two protagonists which makes the twins' relationship the key to the book's drama and that the book "guides the reader through this new world without confusion".

Ed Fortune, for Starburst, wrote: "This is an expertly done opening to a franchise that is going to run and run. There's plenty here for anyone who doesn't know the series with just enough to tempt those readers to seek out the other media. It's almost surgical in it's [sic] precision; it's an excellent read that delivers just enough to keep the fans happy whilst also carefully bringing in new readers. Nijkamp has perfected the art of tie-in fiction as both a way to promote and elevate a franchise".

Andrew Stretch, for TechRaptor, wrote that he was "prepared for magic and swords and the wild adventures of Vex'ahlia and Vax'ildan" but instead "was given a small town adventure, a morally questionable situation, and flashbacks keenly focused on what made these two adventurers who they are. For a Critical Role fan wanting to learn more about these two important characters, it's a fun and fast-paced read, but even those interested in some light fantasy reading could enjoy this". He highlighted the "common 'black and white' nature of Dungeons & Dragons" adventures, however, this novel "creates a glorious shade of grey" where "each twin [is] getting fed the 'right' side of the story [...]. Each new face that Vex and Vax meet tells stories of the tense situation and the losses they've suffered but also shares wholesome compassion with Vex and Vax even as newcomers. It's hard to believe that anyone is the bad guy. [...] This storytelling is so fresh in the world of Tal'Dorei and gives the characters chances to split up that normally get highly discouraged through regular tabletop play. This mystery immediately pulls the reader in as perspectives continually shift and your own assumptions are pulled into doubt. While you're certainly getting more of the story than Vex or Vax hearing each side of the story individually, the reader will still be able to relate to the twins as they attempt to determine the truth".

Kat Bloodgood, for That Hashtag Show, rated the book as 100% and wrote: "fans both new and old will find something to love in this release. But for fans discovering the show for the first time, this is the perfect starting point. And for me, getting to learn more about Vex and Vax in this book was an amazing experience and fun at the same time. [...] One of the more interesting things about the book is we also get to hear about locations we didn't see in Campaign 1. We also get a few different flashbacks within the book. [...] Overall if you're a new fan to CR or you've watched the show since the first episode of Campaign 1, Critical Role: Vox Machina – Kith And Kin is the perfect way to learn more about everyone's favorite twins from Campaign 1".
