= Unbroken: 13 Stories Starring Disabled Teens =

2018 short story anthology

- Editor: Marieke Nijkamp
- Genre: Anthology; Young adult; Varied
- Publisher: Farrar, Straus and Giroux
- Publication date: September 18, 2018
- Pages: 320
- ISBN: 978-0-374-30650-2

Unbroken: 13 Stories Starring Disabled Teens is a 2018 young adult short story anthology edited by Marieke Nijkamp. It features thirteen stories in various genres with disabled protagonists.

== Stories ==
- "The Long Road" by Heidi Heilig
- "Britt And The Bike God" by Kody Keplinger
- "The Leap and the Fall" by Kayla Whaley
- "Per Aspera Ad Astra" by Katherine Locke
- "Found Objects" by William Alexander
- "Plus One" by Karuna Riazi
- "The Day The Dragon Came" by Marieke Nijkamp
- "Captain, My Captain" by Francisco X. Stork
- "Dear Nora James, You Know Nothing About Love" by Dhonielle Clayton
- "A Play In Many Parts" by Fox Benwell
- "Ballad Of Weary Daughters" by Kristine Wyllys
- "Mother Nature's Youngest Daughter" by Keah Brown
- "A Curse, a Kindness" by Corinne Duyvis

== Reception ==
Unbroken was given starred reviews by Kirkus Reviews, Booklist, and Publishers Weekly. Kirkus Reviews described the collection as "sometimes painful, sometimes funny, never sentimentally inspirational." Donna Scanlon of Booklist noted the variety of genres and type of disabilities portrayed, and concluded that "teens disappointed by the lack of nuanced depictions of disability in YA fiction will cheer for these compassionate, engaging, and masterfully written stories."

Ragan O'Malley, writing for School Library Journal, commented on the varying importance of each protagonist's disability across the stories and the intersectional diversity among the cast. O'Malley further stated "the collection of stories is eclectic - not every selection will appeal to every reader - but there is something for everyone in this volume."
