= Marieke Nijkamp =

Dutch author

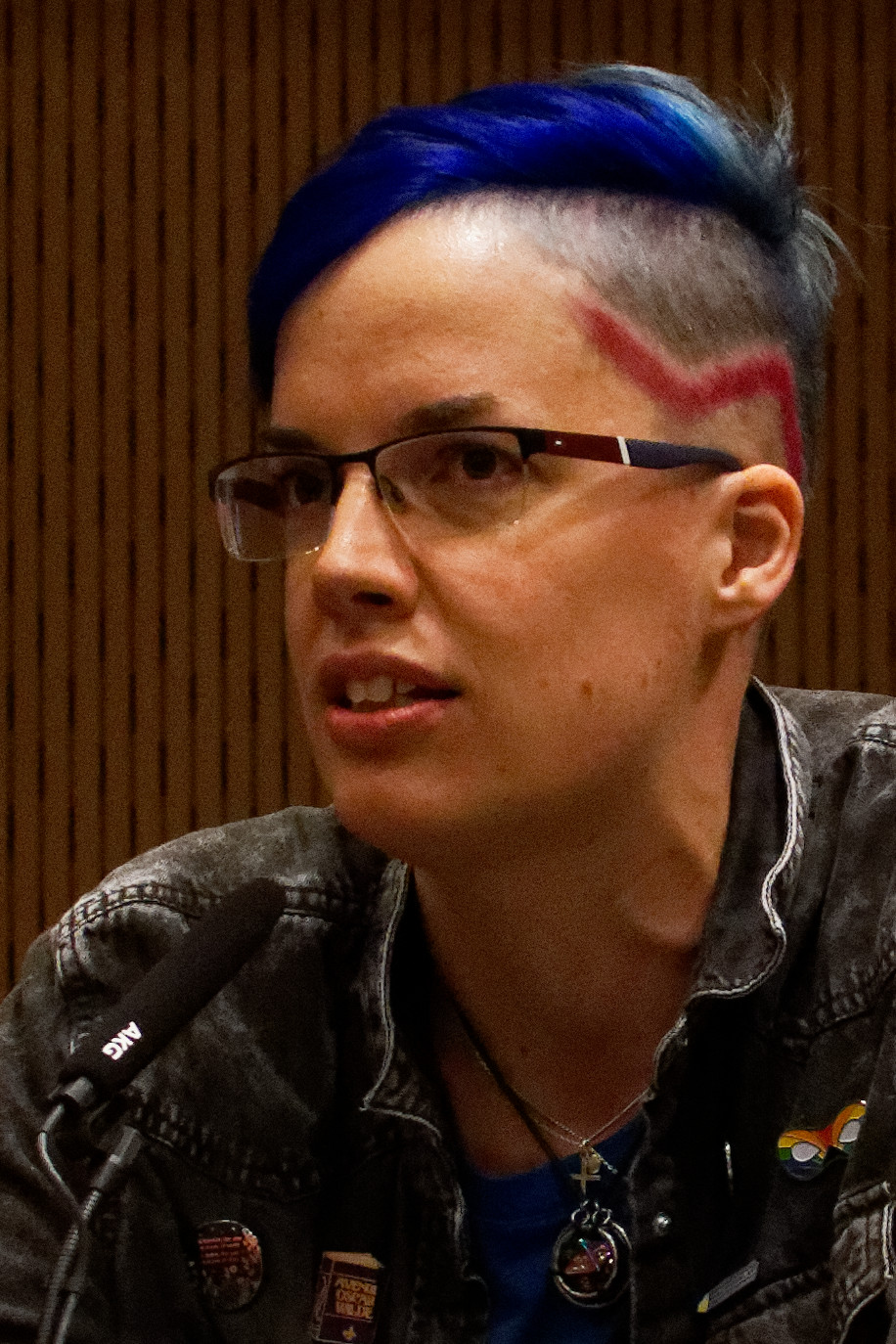
- Marieke Nijkamp at Dublin Worldcon 2019
- Born: 23 January 1986 (age 40); Zwolle, Netherlands
- Education: University of Groningen (BA and MARes)
- Occupation: Writer

Marieke Nijkamp is a Dutch author of young adult fiction. Her (Note: Nijkamp uses all personal pronouns. This article uses she/her for consistency.) novel This is Where It Ends was a New York Times bestseller.

== Personal life ==
Nijkamp was born in Zwolle and raised in Twente, the Netherlands. As a child, she read the Dutch novel The Letter for the King by Tonke Dragt and felt compelled to start writing too.

Nijkamp holds degrees in philosophy, and medieval studies from the University of Groningen. She identifies as non-binary, homoromantic asexual, and is Catholic and autistic.

== Career ==
In daily life, Nijkamp is a civil servant.

Her debut novel This Is Where It Ends was published by Sourcebooks Fire, an imprint of Sourcebooks, in January 2016. She then released the novel Before I Let Go in 2018. In the 2020s, she wrote the young adult novels Even If We Break (2020), At the End of Everything (2022) and After We Burned (2025). She also started a middle grade fiction trilogy, Splinter & Ash, with the first book released in 2024 and the second book released in 2025. The trilogy originated with a short story Nijkamp wrote for This Is Our Rainbow (2023).

She wrote a children's graphic novel, Ink Girls (2023), with debut artist Sylvia Bi. A companion graphic novel, titled Clock Hands, is scheduled for release in April 2026.

=== Adaptations and licensed properties ===
Nijkamp has also written multiple media tie-ins, such as her first graphic novel The Oracle Code (2020) for DC Comics. Nijkamp is the author of the five-issue miniseries Hawkeye: Kate Bishop, with illustrator Enid Balám, which stars the titular superhero. The first issue was released in November 2021 to coincide with the Hawkeye (2021) TV series.

Nijkamp is the author of the Critical Role prequel novel, Critical Role: Vox Machina – Kith & Kin, which was also released in November 2021. In February 2023, Dark Horse, with Critical Role and Amazon Studios, announced a new interconnected prequel graphic novel series for the animated show The Legend of Vox Machina which are written by Nijkamp. The first volume was published in April 2024. The second and third volumes are scheduled for release in March 2026 and June 2025, respectively.

== Reception ==
In May 2015, This Is Where It Ends was announced as part of Publishers Lunch's selection of buzz books (Fall/Winter 2015:Young Adult). Reviewing the book, Kirkus Reviews wrote, "This brutal, emotionally charged novel will grip readers and leave them brokenhearted." Publishers Weekly stated that "A highly diverse cast of characters, paired with vivid imagery and close attention to detail, set the stage for an engrossing, unrelenting tale." School Library Journal called it first purchase for libraries serving teens." The book entered The New York Times Best Seller list (Young Adult Hardcover) in March 2016. It remained on the list for 67 weeks and was optioned as a film by Gotham Group in 2018 with Lysa Heslov attached as director.

In 2020, The Oracle Code received positive reviews, especially for Nijkamp's portrayal of Barbara Gordon's disability. Publishers Weekly stated that "Nijkamp repeatedly explores the idea that people with disabilities needn’t be 'fixed,' along the way considering how stories can be used to reveal hard-to-communicate truths". The Beat highlighted that "Nijkamp has written something for DC’s Young Reader books that feels like the Vertigo of yesteryear, mining innovative stories from the pillars of what it means to be a DC comic". CBR stated that "Nijkamp's previous work, the widely acclaimed prose novel This Is Where It Ends, had provided an unflinching, heartbreaking look at high schoolers confronting horrific violence in their midst. While The Oracle Code is nowhere near as brutal as its predecessor, Nijkamp's first foray into the comic book medium similarly doesn't pull its punches when it comes to depicting the emotions experienced by its protagonist. [...] Nijhamp's first tale in the comic book medium is more accessible than her previous prose works, and she makes the transition between fields naturally". On her next comics work, The A.V. Club wrote that "Nijkamp made her comics debut last year with DC’s YA graphic novel The Oracle Code, a compelling psychological thriller about a teenaged Barbara Gordon dealing with the recent trauma of a gunshot wound that left her paralyzed from the waist down. The script for Hawkeye: Kate Bishop doesn’t have that same level of emotional depth".

In 2021, Nijkamp's handling of IP in Critical Role: Vox Machina – Kith & Kin was praised. Jennifer Melzer, for CBR, highlighted that Nijkamp's "insight into these beloved characters made the story itself feel like the reader was there in Exandria, following closely behind the twins and growing ever closer to understanding exactly how they became who they were before joining forces with Vox Machina. Bailey and O'Brien's deep love for Vex and Vax shines through in every moment, as if their voices whispered in Nijkamp's ear while penning their adventure and expanding the canon lore". Sam Tyler, for SFBook Reviews, commented that "Nijkamp wrote a contained story that works for new readers. Nijkamp takes to writing fantasy within this IP brilliantly. The author has taken on all the information from the Critical Role team but brings their own sense of what makes good fantasy". Ed Fortune, for Starburst Magazine, wrote: "Nijkamp has perfected the art of tie-in fiction as both a way to promote and elevate a franchise".

== Publications ==
=== Middle Grade fiction ===
- Splinter & Ash trilogy
  - Splinter & Ash, Greenwillow Books, September 10, 2024 (ISBN 978-0063326262)
  - City of Secrets, Greenwillow Books, October 7, 2025 (ISBN 978-0-06-332631-6)

=== Young Adult fiction ===
- This Is Where It Ends, Sourcebooks, January 5, 2016 (ISBN 9781492622468)
- Before I Let Go, Sourcebooks, January 23, 2018 (ISBN 9781492642282)
- Even If We Break, Sourcebooks, October 12, 2020 (ISBN 9781492636113)
- Critical Role: Vox Machina – Kith & Kin, Del Rey Books, November 30, 2021 (ISBN 978-0-593-49662-6)
- At the End of Everything, Sourcebooks, January 25, 2022 (ISBN 9781492673156)
- After We Burned, Sourcebooks, July 7, 2025 (ISBN 978-1-7282-9120-8)

=== Comics and graphic novels ===
- The Oracle Code, DC Graphic Novels for Young Adults, March 10, 2020, with Manuel Preitano (Illustrator) (ISBN 978-1-4012-9066-5)
- Hawkeye: Kate Bishop #1–5, Marvel Comics, November 24, 2021 – March 9, 2022 (limited series), with Enid Balám (Illustrator)
  - Hawkeye: Kate Bishop (collects #1–5, trade paperback, 120 pages, 2022, ISBN 978-1-302-93299-2)
- The Legend of Vox Machina: Whitestone Chronicles
  - Volume 1 – Ripley, Dark Horse Comics, 2024, with Tyler Walpole (Illustrator)
  - Volume 2 – Cassandra, Dark Horse Comics, 2026, with Travis Hymel (Illustrator)
  - Volume 3 – The Briarwoods, Dark Horse Comics, 2026, with Aviv Or (Illustrator) [upcoming]
- Siannerra setting
  - Ink Girls, Greenwillow Books, 2023, with Sylvia Bi (Illustrator)
  - Clock Hands, Greenwillow Books, 2026, with Sylvia Bi (Illustrator) [upcoming]

=== Short stories ===
- "Better for All the World" in The Radical Element ed. by Jessica Spotswood (Candlewick Press, 2018)
- "The Day the Dragon Came" in Unbroken: 13 Stories Starring Disabled Teens (Farrar, Straus and Giroux, 2018)
- "Changeling" in At Midnight ed. by Dahlia Adler (Flatiron Books, 2019)
- "Splinter & Ash" in This Is Our Rainbow: 16 Stories of Her, Him, Them, and Us, ed. by Katherine Locke and Nicole Melleby (Yearling, 2021) (ISBN 9780593303979)
- "2:00 A.M.: Wren Willemson" in The Grimoire of Grave Fates, ed. by Hannah Alkae and Margaret Owen (Ember, 2023)
- "Anchor Points" in Out of Our League ed. by Dahlia Adler and Jennifer Iacopelli (Feiwel & Friends, 2024)
- "Sports as Confrontation and Celebration" in Athlete Is Agender: True Stories of LGBTQ+ People in Sports ed. by Katherine Locke and Nicole Melleby (Christy Ottaviano Books, 2025, ISBN 9780316572002)

==== Editor ====
- Unbroken: 13 Stories Starring Disabled Teens, Farrar, Straus, and Giroux, September 18, 2018 (ISBN 9780374306519)
