= Critical Role =

American Dungeons & Dragons web series

- Genre: Fantasy; Actual play
- Based on: Dungeons & Dragons 5th edition
- Starring: Matthew Mercer; Ashley Johnson; Travis Willingham; Laura Bailey; Liam O'Brien; Taliesin Jaffe; Marisha Ray; Orion Acaba; Sam Riegel; Brennan Lee Mulligan; Luis Carazo; Robbie Daymond; Aabria Iyengar; Whitney Moore; Alexander Ward
- Theme music composer: Jason C. Miller; Colm McGuinness; Sean Feica; Peter Habib
- Opening theme: "Critical Role Theme Song" (C1); "Critical Role Too" (C2); "Your Turn to Roll" (C2); "It's Thursday Night" (C3)
- Ending theme: "Twin Elms" (C1); "Welcome to Wildemount" (C2); "Welcome to Marquet" (C3)
- Country of origin: United States
- Original language: English
- No. of episodes: 410 (list of episodes)

Production
- Production locations: Los Angeles, California
- Running time: 180–300 minutes
- Production companies: Geek & Sundry (2015–18); Critical Role Productions (2018–present)

Original release
- Network: Twitch; YouTube
- Release: March 12, 2015 – present
- Network: Alpha
- Release: November 3, 2016 – February 21, 2019
- Network: Beacon
- Release: May 9, 2024 – present

Related
- Several products: Aftershows; Talks Machina (2016–2021); 4-Sided Dive (2022–2024); Critical Role Cooldown (2024–present); Adaptations & spin-offs; Exandria Unlimited (2021–2025); The Legend of Vox Machina (2022–present); The Mighty Nein (2025–present); Other; Critical Recap (2018–2019); Crit Recap Animated (2020–2022); Critical Role Abridged (2024–present)

Critical Role is an American web series in which a group of professional voice actors play Dungeons & Dragons. The show started streaming partway through the cast's first campaign in March 2015. Campaign one ended in October 2017 after 115 episodes, and campaign two started in January 2018 and ended in June 2021 after 141 episodes. A number of one-shots were aired in the hiatus between the two campaigns. After campaign two was completed, the spin-off limited series Exandria Unlimited aired from June 2021 to August 2021. The third campaign aired from October 21, 2021 to February 6, 2025 with 121 episodes. The fourth campaign premiered on October 2, 2025. The first three campaigns featured Matthew Mercer as the show's Dungeon Master and were set in the Exandria campaign setting; Brennan Lee Mulligan of Dimension 20 is the Game Master for the fourth campaign which is set in Mulligan's setting of Aramán.

The series is broadcast on Thursdays at 19:00 PT on the Critical Role Twitch and YouTube channels and the Beacon streaming service, with the video on demand (VOD) being available to Beacon, YouTube, and Twitch subscribers immediately after the broadcast on their respective platforms. The VODs are made available for the public on Critical Role's website and uploaded to their YouTube channel on the Monday after the live stream. Prior to the COVID-19 pandemic, the show had broadcast live, but has been pre-recorded since its return for episode 100 of campaign two.

The cast own the intellectual property from the show, and the show also lends its name to the studio owned by the cast—Critical Role Productions. The studio has produced Critical Role since 2018. A number of licensed works based on the show have been released, such as several comic books and two official campaign setting guides. The Legend of Vox Machina, the animated series based on the first campaign of Critical Role, premiered January 28, 2022 on Amazon Prime Video. The Mighty Nein, an animated series based on the second campaign, premiered on November 19, 2025.

== Background ==
Critical Role is a creator-owned streaming show where the cast play an ongoing Dungeons & Dragons campaign, initially with Matthew Mercer as the show's Dungeon Master for the player cast.

The group's first campaign began two years prior to the start of the series as a one-off, simplified Dungeons & Dragons 4th edition game for Liam O'Brien's birthday. At the time O'Brien was acting as Mercer's voice director on Resident Evil 6. Mercer had been encouraging O'Brien for some time to join a game, but O'Brien had been declining up to that point due to his new child. He eventually agreed to do a game for his birthday, and the bulk of the cast were present at that first session. The players enjoyed the game so much that they continued to play it while switching to the Pathfinder ruleset. O'Brien spoke with Ashley Johnson while the two were working on The Last of Us, and invited her to the campaign's second session. The home-game ran for two years, with the cast meeting approximately once every six weeks and playing for up to 8 hours at a time.

After Felicia Day heard about the private home game from Johnson, she approached the group about playing it in a live-streamed format for Geek & Sundry. The version G&S pitched would have had the players switch over to a video game to resolve combat. Mercer was against this, preferring instead to continue to play at the tabletop as the group had been. The players also vowed to halt the show if it compromised their enjoyment of the game. Geek & Sundry would ultimately host the show until February 2019. In order to streamline gameplay for the show, the game's characters were converted from Pathfinder to Dungeons & Dragons 5th edition before the web series began airing on March 12, 2015. There were initially eight cast member players; Orion Acaba left the show after episode 27 of campaign one. His character, Tiberius, appeared in the first seven issues of the prequel comic series Critical Role: Vox Machina Origins.

Fans of the show are termed "Critters". The name was suggested by O'Brien during the Q&A session at the end of episode 10 of campaign one, which was popular with the chat at the time.

== Critical Role company and studio ==
The Critical Role company, Critical Role Productions LLC, was incorporated in 2015. As of 2019, Travis Willingham is chief executive officer, Matthew Mercer is chief creative officer, Marisha Ray is creative director, Ed Lopez is chief operating officer, Rachel Romero is senior vice president of marketing, and Ben Van Der Fluit is vice president of business development.

In June 2018, Critical Role launched its own Twitch and YouTube channels, with cast member Marisha Ray announced as the creative director of the franchise. The company also moved to their own studio space in 2018 and started putting out new shows on their Twitch and YouTube channels. The sets for Critical Role and Talks Machina moved from Legendary Digital Network's studios to Critical Role's own studios in July 2018. In February 2019, Critical Role finalized its split from Geek & Sundry and Legendary Digital Networks, with live broadcasts of the company's shows and videos on demand (VODs) airing exclusively on Critical Role's channels. Critical Role also took over production responsibility for Critical Role and Talks Machina after splitting from Legendary Digital Networks. Some "legacy episodes" (currently the entirety of Campaign 1, the first 19 episodes of Campaign 2, as well as the corresponding episodes of official discussion show Talks Machina) remain available in Geek & Sundry's archives on YouTube and Twitch, though some older episodes of Critical Role and Talks Machina are being deleted from the Geek and Sundry channels and re-uploaded to the official Critical Role channels since 2019 as part of an ongoing migration of older content to the creator-owned channels.

On March 4, 2019, Critical Role launched a Kickstarter campaign to raise funds for a 22-minute animation called Critical Role: The Legend of Vox Machina Animated Special. The final total raised by the Kickstarter when it closed on April 19, 2019, was $11.3M turning the intended animated special into a ten-episode animated series. When the campaign closed, it was one of the most quickly funded in Kickstarter history, and was the most funded Kickstarter for TV and film projects. In November 2019, Amazon Prime Video announced that they had acquired the streaming rights to The Legend of Vox Machina, and had commissioned 14 additional episodes (two additional episodes for season 1 and a second season of 12 episodes). The project was originally slated for release in late 2020, however in June 2020, it was announced that the debut would be missed due to the COVID-19 pandemic. The Legend of Vox Machina premiered on January 28, 2022. Mighty Nein, an animated series based on the second campaign, was announced in January 2023 and later premiered on Amazon Prime Video.

A leak of Twitch data in October 2021 revealed that Critical Role is among the highest earners on Twitch; the company received a total direct payout of $9,626,712 between September 2019 and September 2021 from Twitch in gross income for subscriptions and ad revenue. BBC News commented that this list of payments is unlikely to "account for tax paid on income" and that "many, if not all, of these top streamers are effectively large-scale media operations, with their own employees and business expenses – so the numbers do not represent 'take-home pay' for those listed". Business Insider highlighted that "Critical Role has grown into a full-fledged media company. [...] Its LinkedIn page lists employees in roles including marketing, business development, photography, editing, and even one person responsible for keeping track of the lore, or details in its fantasy world".

Regarding the potential impact of the 2023 SAG-AFTRA strike on the show, Critical Role stated:

We fully support the strike and stand in solidarity with our fellow actors. Currently, our release schedule is not impacted by the strike, but we will continue to evaluate and take the necessary steps should it be impacted in the future.

Critical Role's fourth campaign premiered October 2, 2025. It features Brennan Lee Mulligan as the Dungeon Master and a new world "outside its usual Exandria setting". Rolling Stone stated that "the inclusion of Mulligan is huge, but not entirely surprising" given Mulligan's background as "a well-established Game Master" who created the "titanic success" Dimension 20 along with previous comments made by Mercer on eventually shifting "into a 'Professor X' role as a mentor to the next generation of storytellers rather than remaining the face of the brand in perpetuity". The fourth campaign features an expanded player cast – in addition to the original Critical Role cast returning as players, Luis Carazo, Robbie Daymond, Aabria Iyengar, Whitney Moore and Alexander Ward joined the main cast. After the campaign's initial episodes, the players were split into three groups with different narrative and game style interests in a West Marches-style (Note: In a West Marches game, a large number of players are split into smaller groups. Although they play at separate tables, the actions of one group of players can have implications for the other groups.) structure.

=== Beacon ===
In May 2024, Critical Role Productions launched their boutique subscription streaming service Beacon with the Critical Role broadcast and VODs available to subscribers of the platform. They announced a new programming slate for Beacon including shows related to the main series – Critical Role Cooldown and Critical Role Abridged. Critical Role Cooldown, exclusively available on Beacon, is an immediate aftershow with the cast still at the table which airs after each episode of Critical Role and Critical Role Abridged, available for early access on the platform, which condenses and streamlines the Critical Role show to 60–90 minute episodes starting with Campaign Three. Cheryl Teh of Business Insider stated that "Beacon essentially gives people what they get with a Twitch subscription — instant access to VODs of their livestreams, but with some additional perks".

== Production ==
=== Format and broadcast ===
Critical Role is a mixture of a weekly show and a modern gaming Twitch stream. The show originally did a live broadcast but has been pre-recorded since Campaign Two Episode 100; the change occurred as a result of filming conditions during the COVID-19 pandemic. Each episode usually runs for three to five hours and is streamed on Critical Role's Twitch and YouTube channels on almost every Thursday, with possible breaks from the show being announced ahead of time. The VOD is made available for subscribers of Critical Role's Twitch channel immediately after airing and before being uploaded to Critical Role's YouTube channel the following Monday, where it can be watched for free. In February 2024, the option to access to the VOD immediately after airing on the YouTube channel was added for YouTube subscribers. In May 2024, Critical Role began to also broadcast on the studio's streaming service Beacon with VOD access immediately after airing for Beacon subscribers. These additional platforms did not impact the distribution on Twitch or the free YouTube VOD which is available after a delay.

Starting with the third campaign, the main campaign of Critical Role did not air new episodes on the last Thursday of every month; instead, other content by the studio aired in its time slot. In March 2026, during the fourth campaign, Critical Role announced that this schedule would not continue. Instead of a set monthly break, pauses would occur due to natural story progression or United States holidays.

Critical Role has included advertisements since October 2015 with sponsorships announced at the start of each episode that "usually also appear in the visual overlay of the show". Sam Riegel is typically the cast member who reads these advertisements. Academic Jan Švelch commented that "Riegel's comedic approach to sponsorship announcements, which often involves only loosely related skits, has become a running gag of Critical Role". He also highlighted that "the most prominent sponsorships include long-term collaborations with D&D Beyond, Wyrmwood (gaming tables and dice trays) and Dwarven Forge (miniature terrain)". Additionally, a number of Critical Role's streams have also served as a donation drive to support nonprofit organizations such as St Jude, 826LA, Extra Life, and Doctors Without Borders.

=== Filming and set design ===
Matt Jarvis, in the UK print magazine Tabletop Gaming, highlighted "what has changed significantly, even from Critical Role's beginnings, is its production values. The audio and video quality of the first few episodes [...] has since been polished by professional lighting, microphones and sets". The cast played at a shared table when it was still a home game, however, the first set at Geek & Sundry separated the cast onto three tables. The set, nicknamed "Felicia's Bedroom", had numerous issues including poor audio, cameras which blocked the player's eyelines and long distances between the tables. O'Brien has stated that it "felt like a child's diorama for a school project". The distance also made it challenging for the cast to see the battle maps. The show moved to another set early on, which featured a "stony, moodily-lit backdrop". A custom game table which allows the cast to sit together was added to the set in July 2017. It was designed by Wyrmwood so that the cast can "see each other and interact with each other" while they are filmed from multiple sides. Mercer is positioned behind a gamemaster's screen in the inset portion with space for his notes; in the center of the table, there is an area for the miniatures and maps used in combat. Critical Role was initially filmed at Geek & Sundry, but moved to its own studio in June 2018. From 2016 to 2019, Critical Role was also available on Legendary Digital's Alpha platform. The Alpha version featured a number of digital "enhancements" including "special real-time dynamic character sheets, damage and heal animations, and visualizations." This version is no longer accessible as Alpha was shut down in March 2019.

Four camera layout during an ocean battle scene in C2 Episode: "Dark Waters".

The show is filmed in a simultaneous multi-camera setup with two cameras at the players and a third at the Dungeon Master. The three camera feeds are "arranged in a single window" for the audience. Additionally, a "fourth 'Battle Cam' can be turned on when necessary, to show a close-up of the miniatures and models used for in-game combat". This composite approach was novel at the time and more commonly seen in e-sports. Prior to this, actual play shows were sometimes using wide-angle lenses in an attempt to include the full table. The composite format came to dominate the genre during the late 2010s. Em Friedman, for Polygon, commented that showing "all angles of a table, simultaneously, live" meant the reactions of the players became "a significant part of the audience experience, leading to some of the most memorable moments in the show".

The D&D Beyond sponsorship, starting with the premiere of Campaign Two, led to an immediate impact "in the physical space of the gaming table" as the players "now had tablet computers in front of them, allowing them to access their digital character sheets". However, "analog components" from player diaries to dice and dice trays have "remained on the table". Academic Robyn Hope, in an essay in the book Watch Us Roll (2021), highlighted how the simple livestream layout has been redesigned over time:

At various times it also displayed sponsors, a live feed of the Twitch chat, the player's Twitter handles, and combat information. As the show progressed, however, this excess text was stripped away: now, the players are each labeled with the names, classes, and portraits of their characters, and aside from the mandatory block for sponsor advertisements, there is almost no other additional text. The physical set has also grow simpler. In early episodes, the players sat in front of a chalkboard and bookshelves; these were later replaced with a façade of stone, wood, and electric lanterns.

A new set, designed by professional amusement park designers Shaun Ellis and Polly Hodges, was built for the third campaign in 2021. The cast are no longer divided into socially distanced individual tables, but returned instead to a common table as had been the case prior to the pandemic. The Wyrmwood table was replaced with a new custom game table. The update also features "enhanced set designs, music, lighting and effects, along with improved sound (each actor will have an individual mic)." The Campaign Three set, which was called the "Tavern of Tales", was then replaced with a new set built for the fourth campaign in 2025. Ray explained that with the Campaign Four set they were able to "innovate and iterate" on what they learned from building the previous set in terms of effects and the "camera dimensions". In comparing the set design, Ray commented that Campaign Three's set was intended "to be a very blank space [...] a tavern that reflects your imagination" while the Campaign Four set "is a lot more grounded in [the setting of] Aramán" and the city of Dol-Makjar where the campaign begins.

Critical Role has played with a live theater audience eighteen times. (Note: List of these shows: 1. Landmark Theatre in Los Angeles (July 14, 2016); 2. Hilbert Circle Theatre in Indianapolis (August 6, 2016); 3. Old National Centre in Indianapolis (August 17, 2017); 4. Gen Con in Indianapolis (August 3, 2018); 5. United Palace Theater in New York City (October 4, 2018); 6. The Theatre at the Ace Hotel in Los Angeles (January 19, 2019); 7. Murat Theatre in Indianapolis (August 2, 2019); 8. Bass Concert Hall in Austin (November 29, 2019); 9. Auditorium Theatre during C2E2 in Chicago (February 27, 2020); 10. OVO Arena Wembley in London (October 25, 2023); 11. Wintrust Arena in Chicago (April 10, 2025); 12. ICC Sydney Theatre in Sydney, Australia (June 19, 2025); 13. Rod Laver Arena in Melbourne, Australia (June 25, 2025); 14. Fishers Event Center in Indianapolis/Fishers (August 2, 2025); 15. Radio City Music Hall in New York City (October 7, 2025); 16. Gas South Arena in Atlanta, Georgia (May 26, 2026); 17. Uber Arena in Berlin, Germany (July 6, 2026); 18. Edinburgh Castle in Edinburgh, Scotland (July 12, 2026)) The tenth live show was the first to take place internationally, occurring at the OVO Arena Wembley, in London. The third campaign's premiere in 2021 was simulcast live in Cinemark Theatres along with the regular Twitch and YouTube livestream. Similarly, the 17th episode of the third campaign was simulcast in Cinemark Theatres, Landmark Theatres, and Cinépolis alongside the regular livestream as part of their 7th anniversary celebration. As part of the show's tenth anniversary celebration in 2025, Critical Role did a live tour in cities across the United States and Australia. In May 2025, Critical Role announced a partnership with Fathom Events to air the remaining live tour shows in movie theaters shortly after each show was recorded. Variety reported, per Critical Role, it is "the company's largest-ever theatrical distribution agreement" with the four live shows being broadcast at "800 movie theaters". In July 2025, Critical Role announced their 2026 live tour – titled Echoes of Exandria – in cities across the United States and Europe. In October 2026, Critical Role announced their upcoming 2027 live tour – titled The Nerdy Best Friends Tour – in cities across North America and Europe.

=== Podcasts ===
On the 100th episode of Critical Role, the launch of the Critical Role podcast was announced: an audio version of the game sessions. It is available on iTunes, Spotify, Google Play Music, and at the Geek & Sundry website. The first campaign's podcast episodes were released in batches of 10–15, between June 8, 2017, and January 8, 2018. Academic Emily Friedman highlighted the length of the first campaign at "447 hours, 39 minutes". She noted that the podcast "is often recommended to new listeners" because it "can be listened to on accelerated speed" with the listener supplementing "their experience with strategic viewing of notable visual moments". Since the start of the second campaign, the podcast episodes have been released on the following Thursday. Starting in May 2024, the podcast is available same day to Beacon subscribers. In August 2025, it was announced that for the fourth campaign, the "podcast episodes will drop in two parts: the first one the week after the premiere, and the second on the following Tuesday".

== Campaign structure ==
The Critical Role storyline occurs in campaigns that consist of a series of story arcs, which are usually played over multiple episodes. Between—or sometimes within—the major story arcs, the characters rest, resupply, or go on side quests. In addition, every player character has a backstory, an unfinished part of their personal history that can be relevant to the campaign from time to time. Sometimes, major story arcs are intrinsically tied to a character's backstory. While each campaign centers on a different party of adventurers, the campaigns are all set on the various continents of Exandria, a world Mercer created. In June 2021, the cast of Critical Role finished their second campaign. Their third campaign premiered on October 21, 2021.

Campaign	Party	Episodes	Originally released		
Campaign	Party	Episodes	First released	Last released	Network
Main series
1	Vox Machina	115	March 12, 2015	October 12, 2017	Twitch, YouTube, Alpha (from 2016)
2	The Mighty Nein	141	January 11, 2018	June 3, 2021	Twitch, YouTube, Alpha (until 2019)
3	Bells Hells	121	October 21, 2021	February 6, 2025	Twitch, YouTube, Beacon (from 2024)
4	The Soldiers, The Seekers, and The Schemers (Note: Due to the number of players, after episode four, the player cast split into three, smaller adventuring parties.)	43	October 2, 2025	TBD	Twitch, YouTube, Beacon
Anthology series
Exandria Unlimited	The Crown Keepers	10 (Note: Includes two episodes from the continuation Exandria Unlimited: Kymal)	June 24, 2021	April 1, 2022	Twitch, YouTube
Exandria Unlimited: Calamity	The Ring of Brass	4	May 26, 2022	June 16, 2022	Twitch, YouTube
Exandria Unlimited: Divergence	—N/a	4	February 13, 2025	March 6, 2025	Twitch, YouTube, Beacon
Limited and related series
One-shots	Various	65	February 25, 2016	TBD	Twitch, YouTube, Alpha (2016–2019), Beacon (2024–present)
The Re-Slayer's Take	The Re-Slayer's Take	31	May 20, 2024	March 3, 2025	Twitch, YouTube, Beacon
Wildemount Wildlings	O.L.G.A. Cabin	3	April 3, 2025	April 17, 2025	Twitch, YouTube, Beacon

=== Campaign one ===
Campaign one takes place primarily in Tal'Dorei, a continent of Exandria. It follows the exploits of an adventuring party known as Vox Machina, previously known as the Super High-Intensity Team (or S.H.I.T.s), a rag-tag group of mercenaries originally formed in the swamp town of Stilben.

==== Pre-series history ====
The Vox Machina campaign originated as the home game of the cast, which was played at home from 2012 to 2015. In their adventures prior to the start of the series, the group saved the family of Sovereign Uriel Tal'Dorei III, ruler of Tal'Dorei and its capital city of Emon. In appreciation, Uriel gave the group seats on the city council, and provided them with a residence called Greyskull Keep, which is located just outside the city.

While the early adventures were not formally recorded, some shorter recordings have been released by the cast. This includes audio from the first session of the campaign, which was released as a segment in the third episode of the podcast All Work No Play. Additionally, O'Brien released a recording of the magic carpet being discovered by the party. Episode 36, titled Winter's Crest in Whitestone, features a summary of the pre-series history, with artwork created by Wendy Sullivan Green and voice-overs provided by the cast. The comic book, Critical Role: Vox Machina Origins, is an adaptation of the group's game before the show. The animated series adaptation, The Legend of Vox Machina, also adapts a canonic story that takes place within the pre-stream time frame.

==== On-stream campaign ====
The show begins in medias res with the characters regrouping in the city of Emon after approximately six months apart and the streamed campaign picks up where the cast's original home game left off. The first episode of the show aired on March 12, 2015, and the campaign concluded with its final episode on October 12, 2017. Campaign one was broadcast live on the Geek & Sundry Twitch and YouTube channels between March 12, 2015, and October 12, 2017, for a total of 115 episodes and six story arcs. Starting in November 2016, it was also broadcast live on the Alpha streaming service from Legendary Digital Networks. The show on Alpha had a unique overlay that included "real-time character sheets, damage and heal animations, and visualizations".

==== Post-campaign ====
In 2019, over a year after the first campaign ended, Critical Role produced three canonical one-shot games that feature Vox Machina in the time frame after Vecna's banishment. The first one-shot, Vox Machina: The Search for Grog, was played at a live show in Los Angeles on January 19, 2019, then broadcast on Twitch on February 22, 2019, before being released via YouTube and Twitch VOD on February 23, 2019. It explored an event that took place in the final episode of campaign one, but was not played out in detail because it would have disrupted the ongoing epilogue. More Vox Machina one-shots were unlocked as rewards and stretch goals during the Kickstarter campaign for the Critical Role animated series. The first of these was Vox Machina: The Search for Bob, a continuation of the events of The Search for Grog. It aired on the Critical Role Twitch channel on June 21, 2019, with the YouTube VOD being made available on June 23, 2019. Another Kickstarter reward was Vox Machina's Summer Reunion at Dalen's Closet, which aired on Twitch on August 29, 2019, with the YouTube VOD becoming available for the public on September 2, 2019. This one-shot takes place a year after the events of The Search for Grog/Bob, as Percy and Vex renew their wedding vows on a beach in Marquet, with all of their friends and family present—as well as a few uninvited "guests".

Critical Role also played another canonical and Vox Machina-related one-shot at a live show in 2019: The Adventures of the Darrington Brigade, which was played at the Bass Concert Hall in Austin, Texas, on November 23, 2019. It stars Sam Riegel as Taryon Darrington, honorary member of Vox Machina, who leads a group of new characters into their own adventures. The story is set roughly a decade after campaign one and a decade before campaign two. It aired on the Critical Role Twitch channel on November 29, 2019, with the YouTube VOD being made available on December 1, 2019.

After the animated series, The Legend of Vox Machina, was picked up by Amazon and, according to Variety, "Prime Video ordered an additional 14 episodes, for a total of 24 episodes across two seasons". Critical Role announced that the animated show would adapt the full Briarwood arc along with other storylines from campaign one.

=== Campaign two ===
The second campaign began on January 11, 2018, and follows the adventuring party known as The Mighty Nein. The story is set on the continent of Wildemount, which was briefly visited during the Vox Machina campaign. The Mighty Nein campaign is set about 20 years after Vox Machina's final battle against Vecna and takes place in a time when tensions between two of Wildemount's mightiest nations are very high. A hiatus due to concerns around the COVID-19 pandemic was in effect from March to July 2020, after which the show returned in a non-live format adjusted for social distancing. In May 2021, the cast announced that campaign two would end shortly; however, "the Mighty Nein's story wasn't finished". The finale aired on June 3, 2021; it was the longest episode at just over seven hours.

==== Post-campaign ====
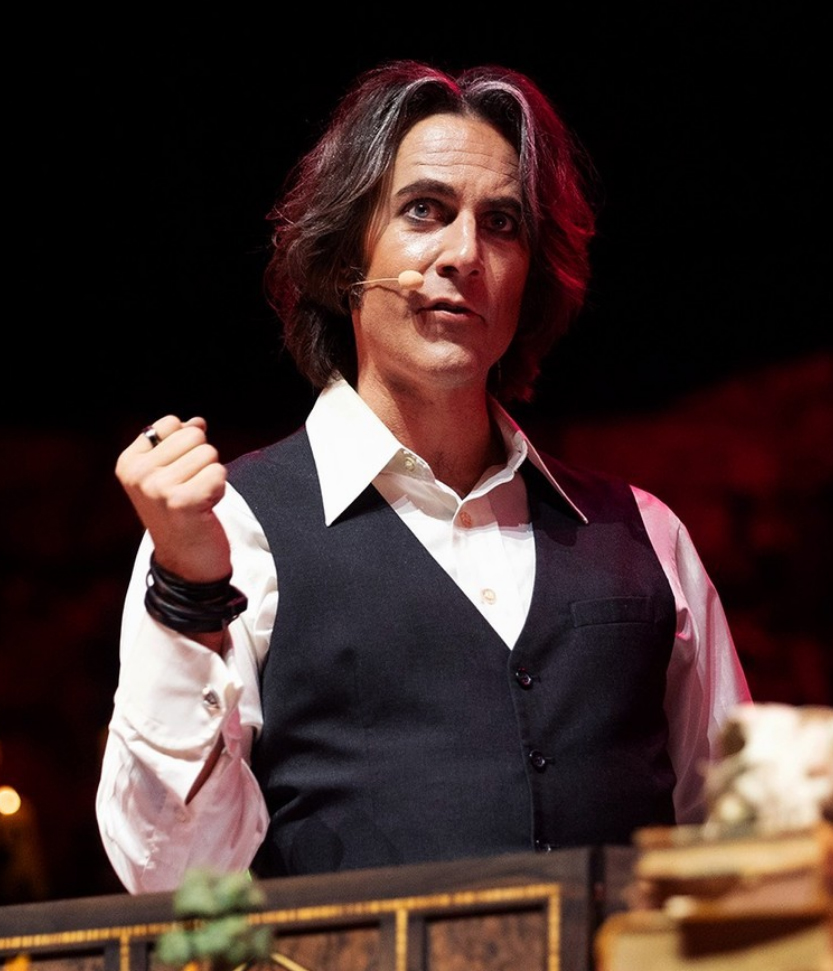
Mercer at the 2023 Critical Role live show in Wembley Arena.

In October 2022, Critical Role announced an upcoming two-part special titled The Mighty Nein Reunited. The canonical story picks up several months after the conclusion of the second campaign with the cast reprising their roles. Part 1 aired on November 17, 2022 with Part 2 airing on December 1, 2022. In addition to being streamed on Twitch and YouTube, The Mighty Nein Reunited was simulcast in Cinemark Theatres in both the United States and South America. The cast reprised their roles again for an episode titled The Mighty Nein Reunion: Echoes of the Solstice, which was recorded live at the OVO Arena Wembley on the October 25, 2023 and streamed over Twitch and YouTube the following night. The story takes place during the third campaign, close to a decade after the second campaign. The June 2025 live shows in Sydney and Melbourne featured two blended parties with characters from both the Mighty Nein and Bells Hells on the search for Ludinus Da'leth in the Shattered Teeth. The October 2025 live show at Radio City Music Hall in New York featured the wedding between Jester and Fjord.

The eight volume prequel graphic novel series Critical Role: The Mighty Nein Origins was published between 2021 and 2024. In January 2023, it was announced that the campaign would receive an animated television adaptation titled The Mighty Nein. The series is executive produced by Tasha Huo, Sam Riegel, Travis Willingham, Chris Prynoski, Shannon Prynoski, Antonio Canobbio and Ben Kalina; Metapigeon, Amazon MGM Studios, and Titmouse will also executive produce. The first season premiered on November 19, 2025.

=== Campaign three ===
The third campaign premiered on October 21, 2021. The story takes place after the events of the second campaign and Exandria Unlimited; it is set on the continent of Marquet, which was briefly visited during the Vox Machina campaign. Multiple characters in this campaign are returning characters. Dorian, Orym, and Fearne premiered in Exandria Unlimited while Bertrand premiered in the one-shot "Search For Grog". The characters met in the city of Jrusar and later named their adventuring party the Bells Hells after a fallen member. After Riegel's character FCG sacrificed themself to save the Bells Hells in Episode 91 (April 2024), Riegel took a leave of absence from the show to receive treatment for cancer before returning to the show with a new character in June 2024.

In August 2024, Mercer started to seed the return of the players as their parties from previous campaigns within arcs in the third campaign which would allow the cast to "play as Vox Machina, the Mighty Nein, and Bells Hells in what would technically be the same fight, though spread out over their respective targets". In October 2024, the cast then reprised their roles as the Mighty Nein while also role-playing as the Bells Hells. In November 2024, the cast also reprised their roles as Vox Machina in a concurrent arc focused on destroying the Malleus Key. The show went on an unplanned hiatus in January 2025 as a result of the California wildfires in the Los Angeles metropolitan area where the studio, cast and crew are located. The finale aired on February 6, 2025; at over eight and a half hours, it is also the longest episode of the series.

=== Campaign four ===
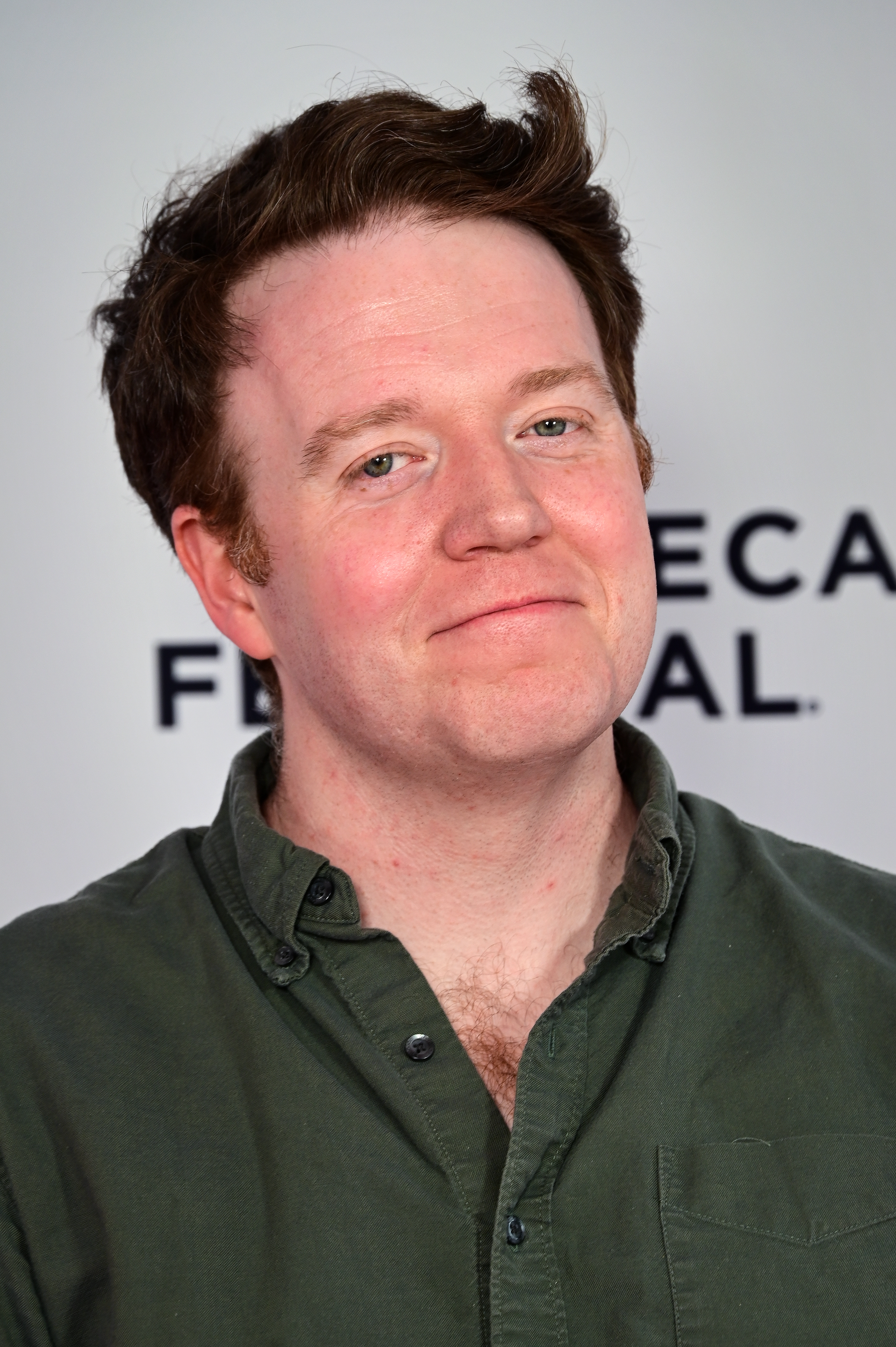
The new Game Master Brennan Lee Mulligan

The fourth campaign premiered on October 2, 2025 and features Brennan Lee Mulligan as the Game Master for a campaign in a new setting called Aramán. On August 21, 2025, Critical Role released the cast and campaign structure for the fourth campaign which included the announcement that the campaign would be using the 2024 revision to the 5th Edition ruleset of Dungeons & Dragons. In addition to the original Critical Role cast returning, including Mercer as a player, the player cast was expanded – Luis Carazo, Robbie Daymond, Aabria Iyengar, Whitney Moore and Alexander Ward will join the main cast. After the opening four sessions of the campaign, Mulligan split the players into three initial groups: the Soldiers, the Seekers, and the Schemers. The campaign then continues in a West Marches-style structure.

=== One-shots ===
Instead of an episode in the main storyline, the series occasionally features a one-shot game—a self-contained story that can be told within the time constraints of one episode (or three to four hours of gameplay). A one-shot could be described as the RPG equivalent to a short story. Some of the Critical Role one-shots are canonical parts of the storylines that play out in one of the campaigns, covering events that occur outside the time frame of the respective campaign, but still feature some of the campaign's main characters. Other one-shots only have a tangential relationship to the campaigns, as they are set in the world of Exandria, but feature a different cast of characters, often in smaller scale adventures that may or may not be canon. There are also one-shots that have no connection with the campaigns or the world of Exandria at all.

Not all Critical Role one-shots use the Dungeons & Dragons game system, as some are based on other RPG systems. In many one-shots, other cast members take over the role of Dungeon Master or game master (GM) from Mercer. The show aired several one-shots in the hiatus between campaign one and campaign two. Some one-shots promote other intellectual properties commissioned by sponsors.

== Cast and characters ==
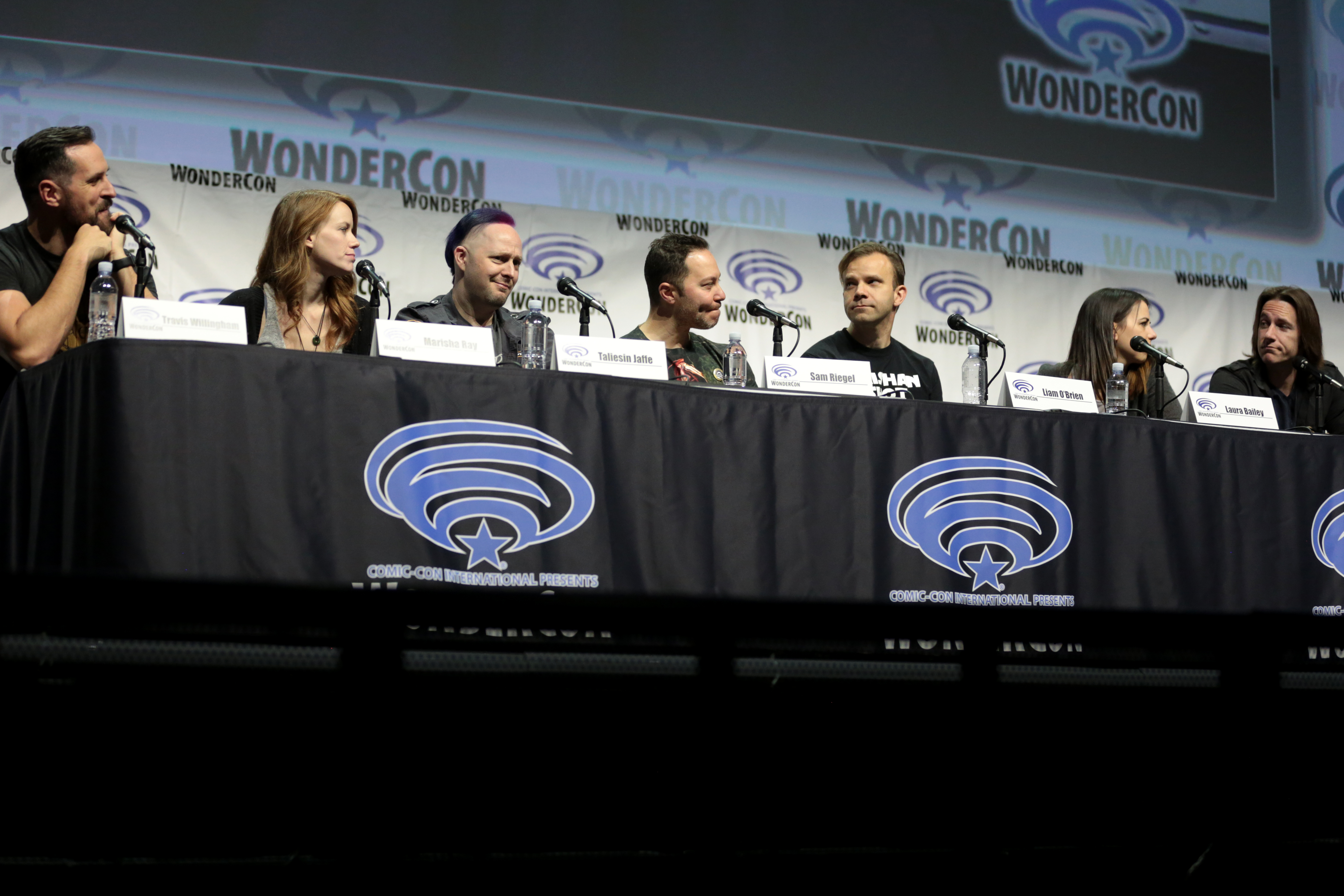
The main cast of Critical Role at WonderCon in 2017.

Part of the main cast for Campaign 4 at GalaxyCon Des Moines in 2026.

From October 2015 to February 2025, Critical Role consisted of eight main cast members, all of whom are the original cast. The show had a cast of nine for the first 27 episodes. The initial main cast of Critical Role consists of professional voice actors. The main cast was then expanded to fourteen, thirteen players and the dungeon master, with the fourth campaign which premiered in October 2025. When asked about the qualifications to become a new cast member, Sam Riegel stated:

At the beginning of every episode of Critical Role, Matt usually says we're, "A bunch of nerdy-ass voice actors who play D&D." I think we don't all have to be voice actors, but we have to be nerdy ass. The folks who do best on our channel are friends – we don't have to be best friends or longtime friends, but we love everybody who plays on our channel and especially the folks who are playing in Campaign 4. We all have really great bonds with them, and it shows on camera. It shows behind the scenes.

A number of guest players have also appeared on the show over the years. Guests are an irregular occurrence on Critical Role and, in most cases, only stay on the show for a one-off appearance or a few consecutive episodes.

=== Main ===
List indicator

This section includes characters who will appear or have appeared in each season.

- A green cell indicates the actor is a main cast member.
- A light blue cell indicates the actor is a guest or special guest cast member.
- A dark gray cell indicates the actor has not participated in the respective season.

Actor	Campaign 1 (Note: Campaign 1 is considered to include the canonic one shots The Search for Grog, The Search for Bob, Dalen's Closet and The Darrington Brigade)	Campaign 2 (Note: Campaign 2 is considered to include the canonic two-part special The Mighty Nein Reunited Part 1 – Unfinished Business, The Mighty Nein Reunited Part 2 – Uk'otoa Unleashed, and the one-shot The Mighty Nein Reunion: Echoes of the Solstice)	Campaign 3 (Note: Campaign 3 includes the mid-campaign special Critical Role: Downfall)	Campaign 4
Starring
Matthew Mercer	Dungeon Master (Note: In campaign 3, Mercer briefly relinquishes Dungeon Master (DM) duty twice. During Aabria Iyengar's guest stint as DM, he plays his Exandria Unlimited character, Dariax Zaveon. Mercer is absent for the three part, mid-campaign special Critical Role: Downfall, which is helmed by Brennan Lee Mulligan.)	Dungeon Master	Dungeon Master	Sir Julien Davinos
Ashley Johnson	Pike Trickfoot	Yasha Nydoorin	Fearne Calloway (Note: For the mid-campaign special Critical Role: Downfall, Johnson plays Trist.)	Vaelus
Travis Willingham	Grog Strongjaw Sir Bertrand Bell (Note: Appeared in the in medias res one shots The Search for Grog and The Search for Bob)	Fjord Stone	Sir Bertrand Bell Chetney Pock O'Pea	Teor Pridesire
Laura Bailey	Vex'ahlia "Vex" de Rolo (née Vessar)	Jester Lavorre	Imogen Temult (Note: For the mid-campaign special Critical Role: Downfall, Bailey plays Emhira.)	Thimble
Liam O'Brien	Vax'ildan "Vax" Vessar Lieve'tel Toluse Derrig (Note: Appeared in the epilogue one shot Dalen's Closet)	Caleb Widogast	Orym of the Air Ashari	Halandil Fang
Taliesin Jaffe	Percival "Percy" Fredrickstein Von Musel Klossowski de Rolo III	Mollymauk "Molly" Tealeaf Caduceus Clay Kingsley Tealeaf (Note: Appeared in the two-part epilogue special The Mighty Nein Reunited Part 1 – Unfinished Business and The Mighty Nein Reunited Part 2 – Uk'otoa Unleashed)	Ashton Greymoore (Note: For the mid-campaign special Critical Role: Downfall, Jaffe plays Asha.)	Bolaire Lathalia
Marisha Ray	Keyleth of the Air Ashari	Beauregard "Beau" Lionett	Laudna	Murray Mag'nesson
Orion Acaba	Tiberius Stormwind			
Sam Riegel	Scanlan Shorthalt Taryon Darrington	Nott the Brave	Fresh Cut Grass Braius Doomseed	Wicander Halovar
Robbie Daymond			Dorian Storm Cerkonos	Kattigan Vale
Aabria Iyengar			Deanna Leimert Dungeon Master	Thaisha Lloy
Brennan Lee Mulligan			Dungeon Master	Dungeon Master
Alexander Ward				Occtis Tachonis
Luis Carazo				Azune Nayar
Whitney Moore				Tyranny

== Reception ==
=== Viewership ===
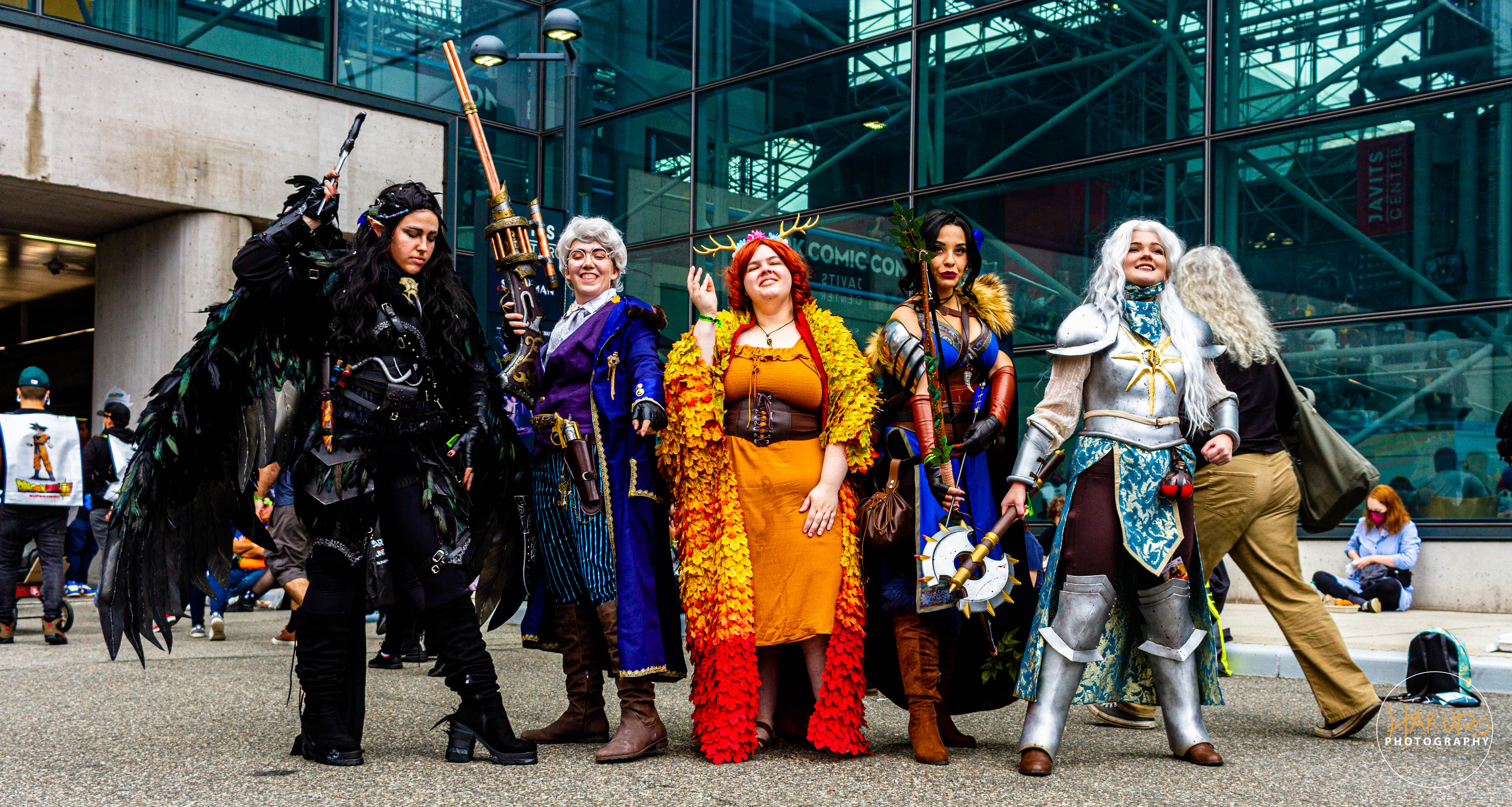
A group cosplaying Campaign One characters at New York Comic Con 2021

Viewer responses to the show have been overwhelmingly positive, with many fans, nicknamed "Critters", creating content such as fanart, fan fiction, character-inspired music, and fan-created merchandise for the show. Fans also send in many gifts for the cast and crew, resulting in occasional "Critmas" episodes during which the gifts are opened and distributed.

By January 2016, each episode of the show had been watched for more than a million minutes on Twitch, totaling over 37 million minutes watched for the whole series. By 2018 the weekly live game had roughly 30,000 viewers, and each episode was receiving hundreds of thousands of follow-up views on YouTube. Additionally, the Critical Role YouTube channel, which was started in 2018, had over 500 million views as of September 2022. By the time the 100th episode was launched, the channel had amassed over 68 million views overall, reaching over 224 million views as of December 2020. As of January 2021, the first episode of campaign one has been watched 15 million times on YouTube.

In 2021, Variety reported "historically, C.R.'s Twitch channel has attracted 60,000–75,000 live viewers for each episode. Factoring in on-demand plays on Twitch and YouTube, the total per-episode audience has ranged from 1.2 million to 1.5 million, according to Willingham." The Critical Role audience has grown significantly on Twitch and YouTube year over year. With 1.1 million followers on Twitch, Critical Role is one of many successful enterprises; Twitch's 50 most popular streamers have 4 million followers or more. In October 2021, Business Insider reported that the official Twitch channel had 828,000 followers and 13,530 active subscribers while the official YouTube channel had 1.4 million subscribers. In May 2024, The Washington Post reported, based on data provided to them by Critical Role Productions, that "YouTube viewership of Critical Role has increased by 125 percent since 2019, peaking at more than 188 million views on the channel last year".

=== Critical response ===
In a January 2016 article, Polygon described Critical Role as a "thoroughly modern" show with a business model that is still developing. In September 2016, Russ Burlingame of ComicBook.com highlighted that the show has a "stellar cast" with good "chemistry". Burlingame commented that it has also "evolved from a pretty simple and low-fi operation in the early days to something much more elaborate and with better production values as time goes on". Early on the show caught the attention of the publishers of Dungeons & Dragons, Wizards of the Coast, who discussed it at length on two occasions on their official D&D podcast in 2015 and 2016, along with cast members Matthew Mercer, Marisha Ray, Liam O'Brien, Laura Bailey and former member Orion Acaba.

Andy Wilson, for Bleeding Cool, highlighted Critical Role as "the best show [he has] watched all year" in 2020. He wrote, "I've said repeatedly that Critical Role is the future of television, and specifically praising their response to COVID that continued their show in a safe way where no one has gotten sick. Let me pause there for a moment: no one has gotten sick. They have been smart and responsible and safe. [...] But even more important is what they did this year. They are, weekly, one of the most-watched streams on Twitch. [...] They gave fans something to look forward to every week– an incredible feat given the endless monotony and despair of socially distant quarantine life." Noelle Warner of CBR commented on how the show has become more polished since the first campaign with the cast spending "far less time on activities in-game that viewers might consider dull to watch" and instead focused "on creating compelling narrative moments between Matt Mercer's carefully crafted encounters". Warner stated that "the main show itself has become more theatrical than ever, with cast members carefully planning their every move and leaning hard into the show's classic, jovial improvisation — which may be heavily curated improvisation but is still spontaneous nonetheless". She highlighted that some fans view the show as having lost something that made it "magical in the first place" by shifting to a more "polished presentation"; however, Warner viewed the evolution of the show in a more positive light since it "has done a phenomenal job of maintaining its voice and vision as the years have gone on".

Rebekah Krum, for CBR in November 2023, highlighted how the Exandria campaign setting was created by Mercer for the first campaign and that "though they started out using a standard pantheon of D&D and Pathfinder deities, all other elements of Critical Role's worldbuilding were and are homebrew". Krum stated that at the time of Critical Role's premiere "most professionally produced actual plays were officially licensed by or connected with Wizards of the Coast and set in the preexisting Dungeons and Dragons world, featuring settings like Eberron or the Forgotten Realms. By basing the series in a homebrewed world, Critical Role ensured that all viewers had access to the same lore information, regardless of their level of experience with Dungeons and Dragons". Cheryl Teh of Business Insider highlighted that the third campaign has many callbacks to the previous campaigns which is "nerdy nostalgia at its finest" – "the depth of Critical Role lore over three campaigns is a testament to how it's becoming sustainable as a long-term phenomenon". Chris King, in his review of Exandria Unlimited for Polygon, commented that "despite Critical Role's commercial success, criticisms of the show have been mounting over the years—first, that the cast wasn't diverse enough and, second, that there was really no easy way in to understanding this world without starting all the way back at the beginning". King felt the show did not succeed as an entry for new fans, however, "Exandria Unlimited is still a big step in the right direction. [...] Iyengar's work here goes a long way toward proving that Critical Role doesn't always need Mercer at the head of the table to succeed." King wrote, "Exandria Unlimited has been able to retain what makes Critical Role so beloved by so many fans, while bringing new voices to the table. [...] It's not an adventure for the uninitiated, but instead an interstitial adventure filled with pre-existing lore and in-jokes to old campaigns, and no clear starting point for new fans to connect with. But it's still a lot of fun".

Academic Jan Švelch, in a 2022 article examining the mediatization of tabletop role-playing, commented that Critical Role's "approach to tabletop role-playing is notably traditional in terms of a clear preference of in-person play with physical accessories except for the use of D&D Beyond as a digital replacement for paper character sheets. In other words, Critical Role promotes and celebrates analog play despite its mediated form. Furthermore, Critical Role's aspirational status among role-playing communities, exemplified by the so-called Mercer effect, is not limited to the cast's acting and storytelling skills, but arguably extends to the lavish presentation of its gaming table with artisan-made accessories and detailed battle dioramas. [...] Critical Role makes full use of this new mediatized reality of tabletop role-playing and its underlying economic logics, providing both spectator entertainment and extensive physical merchandising".

=== Dungeons & Dragons resurgence ===
In 2020, Sarah Whitten of CNBC stated that the resurgence of Dungeons & Dragons began with the release of the new 5th Edition in 2014 which intersected with the "Let's Play" genre of online videos – Critical Role introduced "a whole new audience to" Dungeons & Dragons and helped "bolster the renaissance of the 46-year-old role-playing game". Whitten wrote, "Critical Role isn't just a source of entertainment, it's teaching people how to play Dungeons & Dragons in the same way someone might watch a baseball or football game to gain a basic understanding of the rules and then start playing". In a 2015 interview with Polygon, lead D&D designer Mike Mearls commented about the show: "It was really cool, as a guy who works on Dungeons & Dragons, to open up my Twitch app on my iPad and see Dungeons & Dragons in the first row." Critical Role has been credited by VentureBeat as responsible for making actual play shows "their own genre of entertainment", and has since become one of the most prominent actual play series.

A 2020 qualitative study examining the modern resurgence of Dungeons & Dragons stated that participant responses highlighted Critical Role's "high quality production value and noteworthy depiction of social fun and fantasy tropes" which "cultivated a burgeoning interest in D&D play that they believed contributed to the game's resurgence". The authors commented that "the criticality of Critical Role was repeatedly mentioned by participants and reveals successful convergence culture in action and the impact this has had on drawing more interest and players towards D&D. [...] The progression of Critical Role from a home tabletop game, to live broadcast, to mass-media partnered animated series, to in-canon campaign guide, exemplifies the prolific impact that convergence culture has had on D&D's modern resurgence and popularity".

However, critics have also highlighted the impact of the "Matt Mercer Effect" on Dungeons & Dragons. Named for Critical Role's Dungeon Master, Matthew Mercer, the "mercer-effect" is the belief that all TTRPG/DnD players expect an experience with the same narrative, immersive, and gameplay qualities as Critical Role. Luke Winkie of Slate commented that:

In a world where Mercer's abilities are on public display, they've naturally become something to aspire toward. The problem is that he and the rest of his hugely artistic group of players are world-renowned professionals. Critical Role is a job, and a party of amateurs bound together in the name of casual, Saturday-night Dungeons & Dragons—the purest incarnation of the hobby—is unlikely to eclipse what Critical Role is capable of in the studio. It's an odd paradox: The face of Dungeons & Dragons does not necessarily deliver a version of Dungeons & Dragons you can experience at home. Mercer would be the first to agree.

Elisabeth Garber-Paul of Rolling Stone explained that "the 'Mercer Effect' is a recent phenomenon wherein amateur DMs feel like they'll never live up to the standard" set by Mercer. Mercer has responded numerous times to people asking how to "beat" this effect and critics who cite Critical Role for creating unattainable standards in the hobby. In a message to the community, he writes, "Every [game] table is different, and should be! If they just want to 'copy' what we do, that's not very creative nor what makes the game magic at the table." Garber-Paul noted Brennan Lee Mulligan, who took over Dungeon Master duties from Mercer for the show's fourth campaign, joked "that he has a different definition: 'The Mercer Effect is me and all my friends having a fucking job'".

=== Orion Acaba's departure ===
Orion Acaba left Critical Role in 2015. Emily Duncan of Tor.com stated that the "popular consensus" is to start Critical Role's first campaign after Acaba's departure as "everyone at the table is more comfortable and the energy of the group is more vibrant after the removal of a player who caused some tension within the first two arcs". Emily Friedman, in the book Roleplaying Games in the Digital Age: Essays on Transmedia Storytelling, Tabletop RPGs and Fandom (2021), highlighted that "while the public statements by all were civil and warm, fan speculation was so rampant that the Critical Role Reddit page [...] has an entire FAQ section on what can and cannot be discussed in relation to Acaba and his character Tiberius Stormwind". Shelly Jones, in an essay in the book Watch Us Roll (2021), also highlighted the fan response (including the Reddit FAQ) to Acaba's departure and the cast's "external strife associated" with his departure, such as "disgruntled and deleted Tweets" and an "uncomfortable AskMeAnything [AMA] on Reddit". James Grebey, for Rolling Stone in 2025, commented that the show is not known for cast drama beyond Acaba's departure, noting that "the cast declines to talk about it, and the fan community has largely forbidden any online discussion of the exit. It's fair to say, though, what few incidents like this exist have helped inform what Critical Role and the relationships that make it up aspire to be".

Jones commented that Critical Role's fandom has learned a "behavior of erasure in the guise of maintaining a positive attitude" from the show itself. The FAQ of The Legend of Vox Machina Kickstarter states that Tiberius would not appear in the show; Jones wrote, "while there are many possible reasons for this exclusion, the result is the same: the ultimate distortion of the narrative of Critical Role". Friedman explained that the "audience base expanded significantly in the months after Acaba's departure [...]. As a result, different viewers have a different experience of 'how long' Tiberius was a part of Critical Role. Cori McCreery, for WWAC, highlighted Tiberius' exit in the second volume of the prequel comic. She wrote, "Part of the beauty of adaptations is that you can change things that no longer fit the story you want to tell. The Critical Role team had a falling out with the actor who played Tiberius, and the character wound up leaving the game pretty early on into the stream, and leaving a bit of a conundrum for adaptations like this and the upcoming cartoon. [...] So while I don't know if they're writing the character out in the comics earlier than he left the game, I do know that they do not plan to use him in the animated series, despite his being present for some of the adventures there". McCreery commented that she would "be perfectly fine" if the comic "adaptation took a page from the medium it's part of and provides everyone with a retcon of the group's past". Friedman noted that "Acaba attempted to run an independent spinoff series focused on the character's home country of Draconia, but the show only saw a handful of episodes before it ended. Acaba courted fan appeals to bring back his character (and thus himself), none successful. As of this writing, almost all episodes of the spinoff have been purged from YouTube".

=== Feast of Legends / Wendy's ===
In 2019, Critical Role released a one-shot sponsored by Wendy's to promote the fast food chain's Feast of Legends RPG system. However, following a strong negative fan response to the sponsor, the Critical Role team chose to take down the VOD, and announced via Twitter that they had donated their sponsorship profits from the one-shot to the Farm Worker Justice organization. In 2021, the book The Routledge Handbook of Remix Studies and Digital Humanities highlighted the Feast of Legends one-shot. It states, "neither the game itself nor quality of the Critical Role performance was really at issue [...] Accepting financial support from Wendy's was read among some fans as a tacit acceptance of political positions held by Wendy's. [...] To bring Critical Role into contact with Wendy's was not just bringing professional voice actors into Freshtovia; a whole array of political issues were brought into the mix at the same time. The Critical Role staff scrubbed nearly all evidence of the video from their official feeds and records. The community was significantly jarred by the mashup, not of D&D and fast food, but escapism and politics". Jones commented that decision to remove the Feast of Legends episode was "presumably" made by the show's "development team for purposes of branding and controlling the criticism circulating about the failed experiment". Jones also highlighted that the fan-created wiki followed the show's example and that by scrubbing the episode from their wiki, these fans "are erasing any evidence of negativity in an effort to protect their fan object".

=== Accolades ===
Year	Award	Category	Recipient(s)	Result	Ref.
2016	Streamy Awards	Gaming	Critical Role	Nominated	
2018	Streamy Awards	Live Streamer	Critical Role	Nominated	
2019	Webby Awards	Video Series & Channels – Games	Critical Role	Webby Winner	
2019	Webby Awards	Video Series & Channels – Games	Critical Role	People's Voice Winner	
2019	Shorty Awards	Games	Critical Role	Finalist	
2019	Shorty Awards	Games	Critical Role	Audience Honor	
2021	Shorty Awards	Games	Critical Role	Finalist	
2021	The Streamer Awards	Best Role-Play Streamer	Critical Role	Nominated	
2022	Shorty Impact Awards	Best Influencer & Celebrity Partnership	Critical Role Foundation	Audience Honor	
2022	Shorty Impact Awards	Best Fundraising Campaign	Critical Role Foundation	Gold Honor	
2025	Webby Awards	Podcasts (Features) – Best Partnership or Collaboration	Campaign 3: Bells Hells	Honoree	
2026	The Streamer Awards	Best Role-Play Streamer	Critical Role	Won	

== Anthology and other related series ==
=== Exandria Unlimited ===
Exandria Unlimited (ExU) is an anthology series which premiered on June 24, 2021, and is a spin-off of the main Critical Role series. IGN reported, in June 2021, that "Exandria Unlimited will be considered canon within the wider Critical Role story, and 'will affect future environments and timelines across the overall lore of Critical Role.' So as fans await what may come from Campaign 3 of the core CR cast, Unlimited looks to offer a new vantage point into the world of Exandria".

The first season is set in the city of Emon on the continent of Tal'Dorei 30 years after Campaign One and 10 years after Campaign Two. It features Aabria Iyengar as the game master. A two-part adventure continuation of the first season, titled Exandria Unlimited: Kymal, premiered in March 2022. The second season, titled Exandria Unlimited: Calamity, is set in the Age of Arcanum – almost 1,000 years before the Critical Role series. It was broadcast from May 26 to June 16, 2022. It features Brennan Lee Mulligan as the Dungeon Master. Mulligan returned as the Dungeon Master for the third season, titled Exandria Unlimited: Divergence, which premiered on February 13, 2025; the season focuses on mortals rebuilding the world after the destruction of the Calamity.

=== The Re-Slayer's Take ===
An all-ages actual play podcast set in Exandria featuring "a group of adventurers rejected from the monster hunting group The Slayer's Take". This canonical game uses the Dungeons & Dragons 5th Edition ruleset. It features George Primavera and Nick Williams as the Dungeon Masters and stars Jasmine Bhullar, Jasper William Cartwright, Caroline Lux, and Jasmine Chiong as the players. The show premiered on May 20, 2024. Beacon subscribers have early access to the show.

=== Wildemount Wildlings ===
Wildemount Wildlings is a spin-off which premiered on April 3, 2025. The three episode limited series focuses on teenage campers at the Wildemount Wildlings Camp for Adventuring Kids and their two Mighty Nein camp counselors with Sam Riegel as the gamemaster. The players are Eden Riegel, Aleks Le, Brennan Lee Mulligan and Libe Barer as new characters with Ray and Johnson reprising their Campaign 2 characters, Beauregard and Yasha, respectively.

== Licensed works and related products ==
Critical Role's commercial success has led to many other related products, including a prequel comic series, art books, a novel, two campaign setting books (Critical Role: Tal'Dorei Campaign Setting and Explorer's Guide to Wildemount), and two animated series (The Legend of Vox Machina and The Mighty Nein). Hobby and toy stores sell miniatures and other collectibles related to Critical Role.

== Charity involvement ==
On October 16, 2015, the Extra Life fundraiser episode raised over $20,000 for the Children's Miracle Network during the broadcast. This charity episode included a reappearance of the Critical Rejects, as well as three members of the Critical Role cast: Liam O'Brien, Marisha Ray, and Orion Acaba.

During the show, viewers are invited to donate money to 826LA, which is later provided in a lump sum to the charity. Donation amounts and messages appear live on the stream, and on earlier episodes, a list of donors was read at the end of each session. During Geek & Sundry's 2015 Extra Life fundraiser, a special interactive episode was broadcast. This episode alone brought in over $20,000 for the Children's Miracle Network, and the event as a whole raised over $76,000. In late November 2015, Geek & Sundry's Twitch channel held a special Doctors Without Borders fundraiser, with nearly half of the $10,000 goal being raised during the four-hour Critical Role broadcast. In December 2015, the cast released an article on Geek & Sundry, "Critter's Guide to Critmas", in response to the flood of gifts they were receiving from fans, asking them to instead donate to a variety of charities, with a different cast member sponsoring each charity.

In Spring 2018, the show held a charity drive for 826LA which resulted in community members donating over $50,000, with a matching amount given by one generous community member. The drive resulted in some prizes being unlocked for the community, such as discount codes for D&D Beyond and Wyrmwood Gaming, a second "Fireside Chat" with Mercer, and a second one-shot of the game Honey Heist run by Ray.

=== Critical Role Foundation ===
Critical Role Productions launched a new 501(c)(3) nonprofit organization, Critical Role Foundation, in September 2020 with the mission statement: "To leave the world better than we found it." Comic Book Resources reported that "Critical Role Foundation will partner with other organizations in the nonprofit sector that share the same values as Critical Role and its community, in addition to raising emergency relief funds to be put toward immediate humanitarian aid as needed. Its inaugural partnership will be with First Nations Development Institute, which seeks to strengthen Native American economies and communities. CRF aims to raise $50,000 for First Nations, which will fund the Native Youth & Culture Fund for two initiatives over the course of one year."

== See also ==
- HarmonQuest
- The Adventure Zone
- Dimension 20
