= Critical Role: Tal'Dorei Campaign Setting =

Tabletop role-playing game supplement

- Rules required: Dungeons & Dragons, 5th edition
- Campaign setting: Exandria (from Critical Role)
- Authors: Matthew Mercer, James Haeck
- First published: August 17, 2017
- Pages: 144
- ISBN: 978-1934547847

Critical Role: Tal'Dorei Campaign Setting is a sourcebook that details the continent of Tal'Dorei from the Critical Role's Exandria campaign setting for the 5th edition of the Dungeons & Dragons fantasy role-playing game. It was published by Green Ronin Publishing and released on August 17, 2017; however, it is not considered "official" Dungeons & Dragons material. A revised edition, titled Tal'Dorei Campaign Setting Reborn, was published by Darrington Press and released on January 18, 2022.

== Tal'Dorei Campaign Setting ==
=== Summary ===
This book adds a variety of options for both players and Dungeon Masters:

- Introduction (by Matthew Mercer)
- Chapter 1: Campaigns in Tal'Dorei
- Chapter 2: Gazetteer of Tal'Dorei
- Chapter 3: Character Options
- Chapter 4: Allies and Adversaries

=== Publication history ===
On August 8, 2016, Green Ronin Publishing announced that it had signed a licensing agreement with Geek & Sundry to release a roleplaying game sourcebook series set in the world of Exandria, written by Matthew Mercer and based on the Dungeons & Dragons 5th edition rules via the Wizards of the Coast Open Game License. The announcement was made by Chris Pramas, president of Green Ronin and Ryan Copple, General Manager of Geek & Sundry, live on the 62nd episode of Uninviting Waters at Gen Con 2016. Only one book was published with Green Ronin—Critical Role: Tal'Dorei Campaign Setting—and it is set on the continent of Tal'Dorei where most of Vox Machina's adventures take place. The hardback edition was released at the next Gen Con on August 17, 2017, while the PDF version was released on July 17, 2017. The book is now out of print.

An updated version of the Way of the Cobalt Soul, a monk subclass that first appeared in Critical Role: Tal'Dorei Campaign Setting, was published in October 2020 on D&D Beyond; however, it is not official play material for Dungeons & Dragons.

== Tal'Dorei Campaign Setting Reborn ==
Tal'Dorei Campaign Setting Reborn
- Rules required: Dungeons & Dragons, 5th edition
- Campaign setting: Exandria (from Critical Role)
- Authors: Matthew Mercer, Hannah Rose, James Haeck, Aabria Iyengar, John Stavropoulous
- First published: January 18, 2022
- Pages: 280
- ISBN: 9781737372509

=== Contents ===
The book expands on game elements for the 5th edition of Dungeons & Dragons and revises elements from the previous edition of the book, such as:

- Lore and updated information on each region of Tal'Dorei reflecting the twenty year progression of time between Critical Role's Campaigns One and Two
- Player character options
  - Four new subclasses: College of Tragedy Bard, Moon Domain Cleric, Circle of the Blighted Druid, and Blood Magic Wizard
  - Five other subclasses: Path of the Juggernaut Barbarian, Blood Domain Cleric, Way of the Cobalt Soul Monk, Runechild Sorcerer, and Oath of the Open Sea Paladin
  - 5 backgrounds
- 44 creature statblocks along with updated statblocks for the members of Vox Machina
- Magic items such as the Vestiges of Divergence

=== Publication history ===
In July 2021, Darrington Press announced that a revised edition of the Tal'Dorei sourcebook was forthcoming; it was released on January 18, 2022. This edition moves the timeline 20 years forward from the first edition "bringing it in line with the era explored in Critical Role's second campaign". The lead designers are Mercer, Hannah Rose and James Haeck. Aabria Iyengar and John Stavropoulous, along with the cast of Critical Role, also contributed to the sourcebook.

Beadle & Grimm, a licensee, also released several limited run deluxe boxed set editions of the Tal'Dorei Campaign Setting Reborn which included physical handouts and maps, props and other game master tools.

In March 2023, Darrington Press announced a new virtual tabletop edition of Tal'Dorei Reborn for Roll20 along with releasing the PDF edition on DriveThruRPG. The PDF edition is also available in French. A digital D&D Beyond edition was released in August 2023; this was the first third-party product released for sale on the platform. Linda Codega of Gizmodo commented that "it'd make sense that if Beyond is being opened up in a limited capacity, someone as massively intrinsically successful to D&D as a brand like Critical Role comes first. Although there has been no information given about this release, the license used, or how the money will be distributed, it's hard to exactly say whether or not Wizards of the Coast receives a good chunk of change out of its arrival on Beyond". The digital Nexus edition on Demiplane was released in September 2023.

== Related products ==
=== Critical Role ===
Critical Role is an American web series in which a group of professional voice actors play Dungeons & Dragons with Mercer as the Dungeon Master and creator of the world Exandria. Within the campaign setting of Exandria, the continent of Tal'Dorei is the main setting of Critical Role's first campaign while the continent of Wildemount is the main setting of Critical Role's second campaign.

=== Explorer's Guide to Wildemount ===
Explorer's Guide to Wildemount (2020) is a sourcebook that details the continent of Wildemount for the 5th edition of the Dungeons & Dragons. Unlike the Critical Role: Tal'Dorei Campaign Setting, this sourcebook is considered "official" Dungeons & Dragons material since it was published by Wizards of the Coast. Wildemount was designed with an Eastern European influence – specifically, the Dwendalian Empire was inspired by 15th century Russia and Prussia, Xhorhas by 13th-century Romania, and the edges by 14th-century Spain.

==== D&D Adventurers League ====
Both the official adventure module Critical Role: Call of the Netherdeep and the Explorer's Guide to Wildemount were adapted for play in the D&D Adventurers League, the Wizards of the Coast organized play association for Dungeons & Dragons, upon the release of the Call of the Netherdeep in March 2022. The 14th version of the Adventurers League Player's Guide (March 2024) added Tal'Dorei Reborn (2022) as an option for additional rules in Adventurers League Critical Role campaigns.

== Reception ==
=== Awards and nominations ===
Year	Award	Category	Work	Result	Ref.
2018	ENNIE Awards	Best Art, Cover	Critical Role: Tal'Dorei Campaign Setting	Silver Award	
2022	ENNIE Awards	Best Setting	Tal'Dorei Campaign Setting Reborn	Gold Winner	

=== First edition ===
The sourcebook was a perennial best-seller for Green Ronin. It was on the "Top 10 Games by Dollars Invoiced" list by Diamond Book Distributors for multiple months such as #1 in December 2018, #1 in January 2019, #9 in April 2019, #5 in August 2019, #6 in September 2019, #1 in December 2019, #1 in January 2020, #2 in February 2020. The book was #3 on Diamond's "Top 100 Games for 2019" (ranked in dollar sales order).

Critical Role: Tal'Dorei Campaign Setting was highlighted in issue 210 of Game Trade Magazine, a monthly print magazine. The magazine states, "Until now, the wondrous and dangerous lands of Tal'Dorei have been the sole stomping grounds of Critical Role's adventuring company, Vox Machina. But now, you can explore these realms in a tome from the pen of Game Master Matt Mercer [...]. This setting book takes an in-depth look at the history, people, and places of Tal'Dorei, and includes new backgrounds, magic items, and monsters for the Fifth Edition rules".

Simon Yule, for GeekDad, wrote, "Unlike some of the more recent Wizards of the Coast fifth edition D&D campaign books, the Tal'Dorei Campaign Setting doesn't follow a single linear narrative. Instead it provides dungeon masters (DMs) with the tools to create and build any number of their own campaigns in a fully formed world set one year after the end of the Critical Role Vox Machina campaign. This approach encourages DMs and players to take on more responsibility in the story and delivers a far more creative and unique experience. [...] This entire campaign setting is clearly a labor of love, the culmination of over five years of world building and development from Matthew Mercer. As you flick through the pages, it is easy to see how the foundations of the Critical Role phenomenon were built; sure you need some enthusiastic players and a world-class DM to emulate Vox Machina, but with this campaign setting, you can at least begin follow in their footsteps".

Critical Role: Tal'Dorei Campaign Setting was #5 on Game Rant's 2021 "Best Third Party Books for D&D 5e, Ranked" list — the article states that "players who've always wanted to meet the same people the Vox Machina have met in their adventures can go to the world of Exandria and make a name of themselves. [...] Any Critical Role fan who always wanted to play in the same world as the Vox Machina had can consider this sourcebook a must-have. [...] Fans of Critical Role will recognize this book as a testament to Mercer's talent as Dungeon Master. Players can look at the famed Vestiges of Divergence or villains such as the cultists of Vecna from the lens of Mercer as a DM. Moreover, the book also serves as a great deep-dive into the homebrew Tal'Dorei setting as a 5e-compatible setting".

=== Second edition ===
Chris King, for Polygon, called the sourcebook "The Silmarillion of campaign settings" and commented that the Tal'Dorei Campaign Setting Reborn is over 150 pages longer than the original edition; it includes updates to various factions in the world along with new threats and organizations. King highlighted the various adventure hooks in each location and the sourcebook's bestiary — "there's plenty available for adventurers of all levels to take on in battle. Challenge ratings go all the way from three up to 27, with the majority settling in around 12-18". King also drew attention to the sourcebook's illustrations especially the cartography by Andy Law; he wrote that "as a visual package it just works, and you are completely transported into this world". King concluded that "despite not being a truly system agnostic book, this is an incredibly well-realized world filled to the brim with interesting characters and stories to tell. Even if it just ends up sitting on your coffee table to peruse during regular Thursday-night livestreams, Tal'Dorei Campaign Setting Reborn is well worth the $49.99 price tag".

Ed Fortune, for Starburst, gave Tal'Dorei Campaign Setting Reborn five stars and stated that the book has top-down approach to design — "this makes Tal Dorei Reborn quite a different beast from Explorers Guide to Wildemount. It's denser and bolder in approach, and much more connected to the show than the official books". Fortune wrote, "rules wise, they are some meaty new character types to play with here, and some interesting takes on magic items that aren't innovative but are nice to have. There's some optional rules for running D&D provided that have been clearly well play-tested and thought out. [...] If you're a fan of the show this is essential. If you're an avid D&D player or DM, this book is also just generally really useful. The last time the team at the Secret Starburst Gaming Thunderdome got this energized by a D&D sourcebook was when the ground-breaking Eberron first came out".

Andrew Stretch, for TechRaptor, wrote that "there is a plethora of content to be found within the bindings of Tal'Dorei Campaign Setting: Reborn. From the mind of Matthew Mercer, Hannah Rose, and James J. Haeck while this isn't an official Wizards of the Coast sourcebook to add to your D&D collection if you're interested in the Tal'Dorei setting or the character, magical item, or monster options then it's always worth having more information to pull from. With Critical Role: Call of the Netherdeep adventure book releasing in two short months as a 3-12 adventure this book might even be the best way to start a new party at level 1. If you're already feeling overwhelmed with the sheer amount of D&D content that has been released recently, or have no interest in Critical Role or its setting though then it's likely that you can leave this book out of your collection".

Benjamin Abbott, for GamesRadar+, commented that "Tal'Dorei Reborn reminds me of the lavish, encyclopaedic companion books for franchises like Lord of the Rings and Star Wars that I used to obsess over as a kid" and that the book is "littered with interesting adventure hooks that will likely make you want to put your own party together. In fact, reports of what's been going on since Vox Machina hung up their weapons make me wish we had another series focusing on the new status quo". He also wrote that the book is worth purchasing — "even if you're not a huge fan of Critical Role, it'll impress with its skillful worldbuilding and overall design-quality. Indeed, it's rather lavish and looks fantastic. Sure, I enjoyed our last look at the world of Exandria in Explorer's Guide to Wildemount. But this is a step up in many ways, and I'm eager to dig in more".

Christian Hoffer, for ComicBook.com, commented that "the new Tal'Dorei Campaign Setting Reborn serves as a course correction of sorts, keeping much of the quality of the original and strengthening the weaker parts of the books". Hoffer wrote that "not only is both the cover art and interior art fantastic, the physical production quality of the tome itself is perhaps the finest I've seen out of any recent non-premium tabletop roleplaying book. [...] More impressively, the book isn't content to rest on the laurels of Vox Machina or make the group too central to the politics and fates of various other factions and groups. Tal'Dorei is a full continent of adventure and new factions, threats, and mysteries have arisen that have nothing to do with Vox Machina, their enemies, or allies. Other factions have taken advantage of the chaos and destabilization left in the wake of Vox Machina's adventures, with the so-called League of Miracles emerging as a mysterious force through their magically accelerated rebuild of Emon and other cities destroyed by the Chroma Conclave". Hoffer highlighted that the book serves as an entry point to the campaign setting "so that players can enjoy a campaign set in the world without watching the 400+ hours of the Vox Machina campaign first"; additionally, player options and lore could be used in other campaign settings "without much retooling. [...] Fans of Critical Role will like this book, but so will D&D players who enjoy good worldbuilding or mythology or are simply looking for a template around which to build their own world."
