= Critical Role: Call of the Netherdeep =

Dungeons & Dragons adventure module

- Rules required: Dungeons & Dragons, 5th edition
- Character levels: 3-12
- Campaign setting: Exandria
- Lead designers: James J. Haeck, Matthew Mercer, Christopher Perkins
- Authors: James J. Haeck, Makenzie De Armas, LaTia Jacquise, Cassandra Khaw, Sadie Lowry
- First published: March 15, 2022
- ISBN: 9780786967865

Critical Role: Call of the Netherdeep is an adventure module with themes of heroism, underwater horror and fantasy. It is set in the Exandria campaign setting and designed for the 5th edition of the Dungeons & Dragons role-playing game. It was published by Wizards of the Coast and released on March 15, 2022.

== Summary ==
This adventure module is designed to take player characters from 3rd level to 12th level. Call of the Netherdeep's story is considered to be concurrent with Critical Role's second campaign; however, Dungeon Masters can adjust the timeline.

The module begins in Jigow, a town in the Wastes of Xhorhas region on the continent of Wildemount. From there, players will continue across Xhorhas to the fort-city of Bazzoxan before heading to Ank’Harel, a city on the continent of Marquet. Three factions are set up in Ank'Harel – the Allegiance of Allsight, the Consortium of the Vermilion Dream, and the Library of the Cobalt Soul – and the party's faction alignment will impact the track of their mission as they are drawn to an underwater region called the Netherdeep. Each location has a dungeon for players to explore in order to meet their objectives.

To undertake the deep-sea exploration, players will need to acquire "spells or magical items designed for underwater breathing" along with "items crafted from a unique mineral known as ruidium" in order to withstand the water pressure. Players will also have to contend with the corrupting nature of ruidium. CBR highlighted that the Netherdeep is a region "of deep woe and despair" and that "its dark, labyrinthian depths are host to an imprisoned Apotheon (or demigod) known as Alyxian, who created the tomb to hold himself for reasons the adventuring players must discover on their own. Alyxian's emotions ripple throughout the depths, giving the entire region a heavy, oppressive madness and sense of disconnection not dissimilar to The Far Realm".

Additionally, the player characters will be in a race against the clock because a rival party is after the same set of objectives as the player group. Depending on how the players treat these NPC adventurers over the course of the module, this rival party can become "powerful allies or potent enemies". The story has multiple potential endings, both good and bad, based on the choices the players make throughout the adventure.

== Publication history ==
The new adventure module was announced on October 12, 2021. It is the first dedicated adventure book for the Exandria setting and is the second collaboration book between Wizards of the Coast and Critical Role Productions. The book was released on March 15, 2022 in the United States. However, the European release was delayed to April 5, 2022 due to shipping delays. The book is also available as a digital product through Wizards of the Coast licensees such as D&D Beyond, Fantasy Grounds, and Roll20.

=== Development ===
The book's design was led by Matthew Mercer, James J. Haeck, and Christopher Perkins. Mercer was inspired by the Mariana Trench and other "unknown, deep, lightless spaces". On the book's development, Perkins stated that he was "on the backend process" of the book's creation. He highlighted that:

All of the story beats and big plot points, and settings were all created by Matt Mercer, and he basically handed off his outline and all of his notes to Joey. The two of them executed on the story, fleshed out the locations and created the monster bestiary with their freelance writers. All of that was just dropped on my desk and they basically said, "Here, make this into a book please." [...] In a Wizards of the Coast adventure, we do focus on character to an extent. [...] But in a Critical Role adventure, I think you expect even more depth and more interaction between characters. So, a great deal of the writing of this product was focused on character development.

The book's cover art, by artist Minttu Hynninen, features the five characters of the rival party. On the inclusion of rival adventurers in the module, Mercer said, "I love the idea that the party has the realization that they're not the only adventurers out there. Suddenly they understand that if they aren't going to step up and answer the call of fate and they wait too long, somebody else is going to grab the opportunity. [...] Are you going to try and one-up your rivals, stop them in their tracks, or make friends with them? There are lots of different ways to play out this narrative". Christian Hoffer, for ComicBook.com, highlighted that the rival adventuring party "will level up as the players do, with them gaining new abilities and changing to match the player characters as they progress through the adventure. This is a new-ish mechanic to D&D 5E, although Strixhaven: A Curriculum of Chaos featured NPC statblocks that could be used in a similar fashion as Strixhaven students progressed through their four years of college".

== Related products ==
=== Critical Role ===
Critical Role is an American web series in which a group of professional voice actors play Dungeons & Dragons with Mercer as the Dungeon Master and creator of the world Exandria. A number of licensed works based on the show have been created, such as the Critical Role: Tal'Dorei Campaign Setting (2017) and The Legend of Vox Machina (2022).

=== Explorer's Guide to Wildemount ===
Explorer's Guide to Wildemount (2020) is a sourcebook that details the continent of Wildemount from the Critical Role campaign setting for the 5th edition of the Dungeons & Dragons. Unlike the Critical Role: Tal'Dorei Campaign Setting, this sourcebook is considered "official" Dungeons & Dragons material since it was published by Wizards of the Coast. Wildemount was designed with an Eastern European influence – specifically, the Dwendalian Empire was inspired by 15th century Russia and Prussia, Xhorhas by 13th-century Romania, and the edges by 14th-century Spain.

=== D&D Adventurers League ===
Both Call of the Netherdeep and Explorer's Guide to Wildemount were adapted for play in the D&D Adventurers League upon the release of the Call of the Netherdeep. In March 2022, Wizards of the Coast licensee Baldman Games began running a ticketed Adapted Campaign featuring Call of the Netherdeep which breaks the book up into four hour segments for digital play. Polygon reported that "players will sign up to experience them in sequence, sitting down to play each time with a completely different group of players. Character progress — including leveling up and loot — will carry over. The result is a D&D game that isn't quite as open-ended as ones you might play at home. Players aren't encouraged to wander from the main storyline".

== Reception ==
In Publishers Weekly's "Best-selling Books Week Ending March 19, 2022", Call of the Netherdeep was #5 in "Hardcover Nonfiction" with 9,647 units sold. In USA Today's "Best-Selling Books List for March 20, 2022", Call of the Netherdeep was #50.

Ed Fortune, for Starburst, rated Call of the Netherdeep as a 4/5; he wrote that the module "formalises an old D&D trope, the rival party. This is nicely done, as the rivals aren't exactly villains (so your party can't simply slaughter them) and allow for the DM to throw something in when there is lull in the action. [...] The adventure itself is a nice blend of ancient mystery, cosmic horror and under-water exploration. [...] Unlike other D&D adventures books Call of the Netherdeep finds the balance between an open world and getting your players to engage with the story. It's not as limited as say Tyranny of Dragons but nor is it a pseudo-setting book like Icewind Dale". Fortune highlighted that while the book corresponds with the Exandria setting books, Explorer's Guide to Wildemount (2020) and Tal'Dorei Campaign Setting Reborn (2022), a prospective Dungeon Master will only need the basic rules and the adventure module itself to run the campaign; the module also does not require familiarity with the Critical Role show.

Chris de Hoog, for CGMagazine, rated Call of the Netherdeep as a 9/10; he prefaced his review with the statement that he only has "passing knowledge" of Critical Role. de Hoog wrote that "the adventure itself feels a little more prescribed, trying to hold your hand more than recent adventures like Wild Beyond the Witchlight. [...] The climactic showdown is one of the best approximations of a video game's final, multi-phase boss I’ve seen translated into D&D yet. [...] Critical Role represents the pinnacle of what good, fun Dungeons & Dragons play can look like, so it's fitting that Call of the Netherdeep should also be a gold standard sourcebook". de Hoog highlighted that there are several different endings possible which depends "upon the Apotheon's fate and the group's real-world investment in Exandria" and that these different endings "would even help establish a follow-up campaign". He also noted that there isn't an "alternate cover for Call of the Netherdeep. The art direction throughout the book is fantastic, with a ruidium-styled motif, detailed maps, and abundant character art, so it's almost a shame that we didn't get a premium cover to match—but this is a small quibble".

David Smith, for Kotaku Australia, called Call of the Netherdeep "a great little adventure" and that it is a "Rollercoaster Campaign" with a brisk pace that engages players no matter their level of interest in roleplaying. Smith wrote that while the adventure could be a "Roll For Initiative sword-and-board D&D experience", the module is also "built to offer the cerebral equivalent too, turning conversations into loaded jousts. With the right crowd, it seems like it would be a great (if at times grim) journey into the kind of horror that dominated the latter half of CR's Campaign 2. For fans of the show, it's perhaps the closest to cracking open Exandria's origins that Mercer has come to date. Call of the Netherdeep is steeped in the history of The Calamity, a cataclysmic event in which the Exandrian pantheon exploded into a civil war that put the entire world in peril". Smith also commented that the secrets of the second moon Ruidus had previously sent Critical Role "theorycrafters down the rabbit hole" especially as "Ruidus looms large in the Campaign 3 story" – this book "nukes those theories with cold hard canon in a way the previous campaigns never did".

Chris Stevenson, in the Strange Assembly review, highlighted three key components of the module – the first is "how you treat people matters. Yes, Call of the Netherdeep is a D&D campaign and, yes, it has epic fights. But it's also campaign of relationships, empathy, and personal growth (or the lack thereof, depending on how you want to play it). From start to finish, these things will significantly impact the campaign, both the characters and the world around them. [...] Second, decisiveness matters". The third component is the fickleness of destiny; "the characters’ choices matter. There's more than one way this thing can go". Stevenson wrote that this module demonstrates an epic campaign is possible without reaching level 20. They commented that "like a lot of recent 5E content, this one is not going to scratch your itch for an old school dungeon crawl. But if you want a really emotionally meaningful campaign – without the DM needing to improvise every single bit of the social stuff – it's hard to beat".

Dan Arndt, in The Fandomentals review, prefaced that he has no experience with Critical Role media outside of the sourcebooks. Arndt highlighted the main theme of the campaign is what makes a hero and how do they impact the world around them; "while I have my gripes with Exandria and Wildemount in particular, the adventure really ended up winning me over as time went on. There's some fascinating concepts at play here". He commented that Ank'Harel is "where we finally see things break away from the bog standard medieval fantasy of Wildemount". Arndt wrote that the Netherdeep location which contains the Apotheon is "a bit" Lovecraftian – "rather than a simple boss fight, you instead travel through the memories of the Apotheon a.k.a. Alyxian as he journeys grows from a child of destiny to a troubled hero to a defeated prisoner yearning for freedom. The battles all involve monsters and manifestations of these memories, and at the end you confront not just Alyxian but his own self-image".
