= Critical Role campaign one =

Campaign of the web series Critical Role

- Campaign poster art by Matteo Scalera and Moreno Dinisio
- No. of episodes: 115

Release
- Original network: Twitch; YouTube; Alpha (Note: From 2016.)
- Original release: March 12, 2015 – October 12, 2017

Season chronology
- Next → Campaign two

The first campaign of the Dungeons & Dragons web series Critical Role premiered on March 12, 2015; it consisted of 115 episodes and concluded on October 12, 2017. It followed Vox Machina, a party of seven to eight adventurers, in their travels across the continent of Tal'Dorei. Campaign one broadcast live each Thursday at 19:00 PT on Geek & Sundry's Twitch channel, with the video on demand (VOD) being available to Twitch subscribers immediately after the broadcast. On the Monday following the live stream, the VODs were made available for the public on the Geek & Sundry YouTube channel.

== Cast ==
=== Main ===
For the first 27 episodes, Campaign 1 had nine cast members: eight players and a Dungeon Master. This became eight from episode 28 to the conclusion of the campaign with episode 115.

- Matthew Mercer as the Dungeon Master
- Ashley Johnson as Pike Trickfoot, gnome cleric
- Travis Willingham as Grog Strongjaw, goliath barbarian / fighter
- Laura Bailey as Vex'ahlia "Vex" de Rolo, née Vessar, half-elf ranger / rogue
- Liam O'Brien as Vax'ildan "Vax" Vessar, half-elf rogue / paladin / druid
- Taliesin Jaffe as Percival "Percy" Fredrickstein Von Musel Klossowski de Rolo III, human gunslinger
- Marisha Ray as Keyleth of the Air Ashari, half-elf druid
- Orion Acaba as Tiberius Stormwind, dragonborn sorcerer; the sorcerer leaves Vox Machina during the journey to Whitestone and is later killed when the Chroma Conclave attacks Draconia.
- Sam Riegel as:
  - Scanlan Shorthalt, gnome bard; the bard temporarily leaves the group to spend time with his daughter and to focus on self-discovery.
  - Taryon Darrington, human artificer; the artificer joins Vox Machina after the defeat of the Chroma Conclave.

=== Guest ===
In total, 13 guest players appeared in Campaign 1.

- Felicia Day as Lyra, human wizard
- Mary Elizabeth McGlynn as Zahra Hydris, tiefling warlock
- Wil Wheaton as Thorbir Falbek, dwarf fighter
- Will Friedle as Kashaw Vesh, human cleric
- Kit Buss as Lillith Anioska Daturai, tiefling wizard
- Jason C. Miller as Garthok, half-orc rogue
- Chris Hardwick as Gern Blanston, dragonborn wizard
- Chris Perkins as Shale, goliath fighter
- Patrick Rothfuss as Kerrek, human paladin
- ND Stevenson as Tova, dwarf/werebear blood hunter
- Jon Heder as Lionel "Chod" Gayheart, half-orc bard / barbarian
- Darin De Paul as Ethrid "Sprigg" Brokenbranch, gnome rogue
- Joe Manganiello as Arkhan the Cruel, red dragonborn paladin / barbarian

Additionally, the following guest players appeared in episode 12, which featured a one-shot rather than a traditional Vox Machina episode:

- Dan Casey as Salty Pete
- Zac Eubank as Snugglelord
- Ify Nwadiwe as Ulfgar Fireforge

== Synopsis ==
The Kraghammer story arc (16 episodes, 1–16) starts in medias res at the point in Vox Machina's story where the cast's original home game left off. It takes place primarily in the subterranean depths of the Underdark, and culminates in a battle between Vox Machina and a dangerous beholder by the name of K'varn, who is controlling an entire city of Illithid.

The Vasselheim story arc (7 episodes, 17–23) splits the party into two groups, who seek to prove their worth to the "Slayer's Take", a local adventurer's guild in the ancient city of Vasselheim, by taking on dangerous missions. This arc features multi-episode guest appearances by Felicia Day (Lyra), Mary Elizabeth McGlynn (Zahra), Wil Wheaton (Thorbir), and Will Friedle (Kashaw), adding a new twist to the now-divided adventuring band. This arc also includes the first episode (episode 22) that touches on a character's backstory, as Keyleth visits another druid tribe to continue her Aramenté, a journey to become the leader of her people.

The Briarwood story arc (15 episodes, 24–38) leads Vox Machina to Percy's ancestral home, the city of Whitestone, which was once ruled by his family. The party have to fight for control over Whitestone against Lord and Lady Briarwood, who are responsible for the demise of most of the de Rolo family and have taken the city as their own. The Briarwood's ties into necromancy and a secret cult make things even more dangerous, and Vox Machina must stop them from completing a ritual that threatens to endanger the entire kingdom. During the early stages of this arc, Tiberius leaves Vox Machina for good.

The Chroma Conclave story arc (46 episodes, 39–84) begins with the attack of four ancient chromatic dragons on Emon, the capital of Tal'Dorei, with the Sovereign and other important political figures falling in the onslaught. The dragons take control over and divide the kingdom, and in order to defeat them, Vox Machina needs more power than they currently have. They search for the "Vestiges of Divergence", famed and extremely powerful magical items from ages passed, which are scattered throughout the world. During the ongoing battles against the powerful dragons of the Chroma Conclave, the backstories of some characters are also further explored. Smaller arcs focus on Grog's herd that once exiled him, the last figure from Percy's traumatic past, as well as a strained family reunion for the twins, Vex and Vax. Episodes in this arc are broken up into 3 parts (39-56, 57–69, 70–84) based on Geek & Sundry's change of colour in thumbnails on YouTube.

The Taryon Darrington story arc (15 episodes, 85–99) begins with the departure of Scanlan from the group, whose use of "spice" (an in-campaign illicit drug) and disagreements with the group culminate in an argument that shakes the party. While traveling to Ank'Harel on the continent of Marquet, Vox Machina meet Taryon Darrington, an inexperienced aspiring author and adventurer. Adventuring together with Taryon, some smaller story arcs see Vox Machina helping Keyleth (who seeks to complete her Aramenté), traveling to hell, as well as dealing with Taryon's family, who reside in the Dwendalian Empire on the continent of Wildemount. It also features Taryon's coming out story. During this arc, which is loosely defined by Scanlan's absence and Taryon's presence in the party, Pike's family also makes an appearance and her relationship with them is explored. The arc includes a one-year time skip between episodes 94 and 95.

The Cult of Vecna story arc (16 episodes, 100–115) revisits the mysterious and dangerous artifact that was activated beneath Whitestone Castle during the Briarwood story arc. Scanlan finally rejoins Vox Machina, while the party now has to fight a cult which tries to summon the evil lich demigod Vecna, who seeks to ascend to true godhood and rule Exandria. His ascension actually succeeds and he becomes the only god on this side of the Divine Gate, which keeps the other gods from directly interfering in the world they created. With the indirect help of some of the prime deities who aid them with special powers, Vox Machina are the only group of heroes who can possibly stop the "Whispered One" in one gigantic final battle.

After the conclusion of the primary campaign, several one-shots have taken place using Vox Machina. These include "The Search for Grog" and "The Search for Bob", which portray an adventure on the plane of Pandemonium which was only briefly summarized toward the end of the final episode. Additionally, the "Dalen's Closet" one-shot portrayed the wedding vow renewal of Vex'ahlia and Percy one year later.

== Production and format ==
The Vox Machina campaign originated as the home-game of the cast, which started in 2012. While the adventures prior to the Kraghammer arc in 2015 were not formally recorded, some shorter recordings have been released by the cast.

The format and production values evolved significantly over the course of the run. The initial set, nicknamed "Felicia's Bedroom" by the cast, had a number of issues. They were seated at three tables which were located far apart from one another, the cameras got in the way of the players' eyelines, and the audio quality was very poor. The show moved to another set early on, which featured a "stony, moodily-lit backdrop".

Campaign one was originally broadcast live on the Geek & Sundry Twitch and YouTube channels between March 12, 2015, and October 12, 2017, for a total of 115 episodes. Starting in November 2016, it was also broadcast live on the Alpha streaming service from Legendary Digital Networks. The show on Alpha had a unique overlay that included "real-time character sheets, damage and heal animations, and visualizations". Campaign one's closed captions were transcribed by a fan group who submitted them to Geek & Sundry. Geek & Sundry then added these to the YouTube VODs. The VODs have since been uploaded to Critical Role's own YouTube channel. A number of cast members were absent during episode 12, and so Mercer ran a Dungeon Master workshop rather than a session with Vox Machina. Further workshop and DM tip videos would be released by Geek & Sundry over the following years but unlike episode 12 these were not given numerical episode designations.

=== Pre-game segments ===
An announcement segment was present through much of the run, usually with Mercer opening the show, followed by other announcements such as new merchandise or other projects from the cast. These would continue into the second campaign in a similar fashion. On occasion, guests would be present for the announcement segment, such as prop maker Kai Norman in episode 15. The opening and break sequences initially featured backstory videos about each player character- these used copyrighted artwork and had to be blurred out of the VOD versions. The clips were eventually removed from the introduction in favour of a live-action opening sequence with the cast. The first of these featured the cast in costumes, much of which were owned by Jaffe for use at ren faires. The second live action opening featured more elaborate costumes and make-up.

A segment informally referred to as "Critmas" featured cast members opening mail and gifts from fans. This originated as a pre-game segment in episode 5, later becoming a sporadic post-game segment through the first half of the show's run. Beginning in episode 3, fans would also order food such as pizza to be delivered to the studio; this would arrive mid-game and quickly became unmanageable so the studio set up a PO Box for non-perishables. From December 2015, Geek & Sundry instead encouraged generous fans to donate to a list of sponsored charities.

=== Post-game segments ===
Several post-game segments were employed, particularly early on in the run. These included giveaways, Q&A sessions with the chat, and reading the names and messages of donors. Episode 11 featured a 45-minute dancing sequence after the game to celebrate reaching a subscription threshold. In the book The World of Critical Role, it was revealed that these dance segments came from a desire to keep the core game session to three hours, while filling the dedicated time slot on Geek & Sundry. These segments later fell out of use in favor of longer play times and were edited out of the podcast versions of the episodes.

== Episodes ==
=== 2015 ===
List of episodes in 2015
Episode	Title	Original release date	Notes
1	"Arrival at Kraghammer"	March 12, 2015	Ashley Johnson is absent.
Vox Machina enter the dwarven city of Kraghammer in search of Lady Kima of Vord, who has gone missing after seeking to destroy something evil brewing beneath the city. They get rooms at the Iron Hearth tavern, and Tiberius draws the ire of House Thunderbrand. Owing to a misunderstanding, Vex's bear Trinket has become engaged in a bear fight back at the tavern and the party is forced to intervene. The following day they visit the owner of the Mithril mines, Nostoc Greyspine, and learn that Kima had disappeared below some time ago. As they finish talking, a large group of goblins rush up to the surface and they aid the dwarves in fighting them off. They realise the goblins who just came out of the mines were actually fleeing a strange abomination, which is ultimately slain by Scanlan.
2	"Into the Greyspine Mines"	March 19, 2015	Ashley Johnson is absent.
Greyspine offers the party a reward if they can stop the source of these attacks from below the mine. They stop by House Thunderbrand and purchase supplies at the Value of Valor before making their descent. They are attacked by two umber hulks, along with three duergar and an intellect devourer, which strikes Grog and leaves him catatonic. The last duergar surrenders, but Grog does not respond to healing.
3	"Strange Bedfellows"	March 26, 2015	Ashley Johnson is absent.
After failing to revive Grog, Vox Machina interrogate and torture the duergar before killing her. They rest at the duergars' campsite, briefly examining its surroundings. Keyleth manages to revive Grog through a ritual. Following a series of tracks, they investigate a goblin village and spot a warcamp on the far side of a bridged crevasse. Scanlan scouts out the area and finds trolls and a mind flayer holding hostage three dwarfs. The party enact a plan to destroy them: Keyleth casts the Hallucinatory Terrain spell, creating an illusion of solid terrain instead of the bridge, and Vax acts as bait to trick them into tumbling over the edge. The plan succeeds, but Vax nearly falls to his death and is saved at the last moment by Tiberius. Keyleth and Vex explore an hidden cave lower down in the crevasse, where they encounter a mind flayer outcast – and potential ally – named Clarota.
4	"Attack on the Duergar Warcamp"	April 2, 2015	Ashley Johnson's first on screen episode. The cast host a Q&A at the end.
Resting in the abandoned goblin village, Clarota shares his knowledge of K'Varn, a beholder who has taken control of his people. They discuss various plans for how to attack the duergar warcamp on the far side of the chasm. Vax and Scanlan ambush the camp's illithid, while the rest of the party make use of the Daylight spell to blind their foes. The fight becomes more complicated when a bulette rises from below their feet to join the fight, but Grog manages to kill it.
5	"The Trick about Falling"	April 9, 2015	Sam Riegel is absent. The ooze was selected by the chat for the encounter.
The party interrogate the general from the camp, and with the aid of Clarota learn more about K'Varn. They intend to let him go, but his brain is eaten by Clarota. A risky escape leaves Clarota injured, and so they heal him and rest up. They encounter a group of ogres pulling a cart and a fight ensues- rousing the oozes concealed on the cart- but gain the upper hand.
6	"Breaching the Emberhold"	April 16, 2015	–
As the group head deeper they encounter the subterranean fortress of Emberhold. They attack some of the guards and encounter a hidden stone door behind a falling flow of magma. They fight their way into a dungeon and rescue Lady Kima. She has a tense moment with Clarota, whom she naturally distrusts due to his nature as an illithid.
7	"The Throne Room"	April 23, 2015	Travis Willingham is absent.
The party continue to explore Emberhold. They fight and interrogate a duergar mage and learn that K'Varn himself is likely waiting for them above. They debate their next actions, concerned that if they make a break for the surface they may be pursued and trapped in a two-front battle. They head for the throne room of the fortress and confront the duergar king Murghol and his wife, queen Ulara. The king is killed, but queen Ulara escapes amid a dangerous encounter, complicated by the presence of two basilisks. Grog is captured, Kima and Tiberius are petrified, and the unconscious Vax receives a serious burn on his right leg from magma.
8	"Glass and Bone"	April 30, 2015	Travis Willingham is absent.
Emberhold is swamped by lava as Vox Machina retreat, carrying their frozen companions and discussing how to retrieve Grog. Tiberius and Kima are revived with Greater Restoration and Kima shares a vision she had of K'varn, who possesses one of the horns of Orcus. They rest, and track Grog's scent towards a pit filled with volcanic glass shards. Duergar below are fighting some abomination, and the party get involved. Trinket is knocked unconscious, but is retrieved by Keyleth, Tiberius and Pike. Vax discovers a duergar camp on the far side, containing Queen Ulara and a captive Grog.
9	"Yug'Voril Uncovered"	May 7, 2015	Ashley Johnson is absent.
Tiberius is spotted and Vax is forced to kill the duergar lookout. They confront the queen and a fight breaks out, with an invisible illithid attacking. They free Grog from his shackles, and K'Varn possesses the queen, and asks them to come to his temple as "treasured guests". This starts a debate about their purpose below ground, with the group agreeing to try and stop K'Varn and retrieve the horn of Orcus. Some armour is discovered in a secret chamber, and is claimed by Kima. The party begin their descent to Yug'Voril, a subterranean city of illithid, and the home of Clarota.
10	"K'Varn Revealed"	May 14, 2015	The last episode with character backstory videos at the start.
The party are attacked by a group of undead and a cloaker. They encounter a portal to the far realm- perhaps K'Varn's entry point- and collapse the cavern around it. They perform some magical research, with Tiberius contacting his brother Jerahd and Keyleth scrying on K'Varn. She sees the Elder brain in the centre of the city, and sees the armoured beholder directly. They head for the city, and encounter a giant.
11	"The Temple Showdown"	May 21, 2015	–
The party attempt to subdue and restrain the giant "Tiny" with mixed success, eventually putting it under a Geas spell so it can help them attack K'Varn. They make their plans for the attack and rest up. Grog nearly attacks Tiny when it downs his cask of ale, but a fight is averted. Through cunning use of the magic carpet and a Polymorph spell, Vox Machina crash through the roof of the temple and engage K'Varn. Lady Kima is turned to stone while Grog is killed and revived during the battle, but Tiberius lands the killing blow on K'varn's central eye and retrieves the Horn of Orcus.
12	"Dungeons & Dragons Campaign Tips"	May 28, 2015	Laura Bailey, Ashley Johnson, Sam Riegal and Travis Willingham are absent. Guest stars Dan Casey, Zac Eubank, and Ify Nwadiwe.
A special episode in which Matthew Mercer runs a D&D workshop and answers questions from the chat, as most of the cast are unavailable. He then supports some guests with character creation and runs a short one-shot.
13	"Escape from the Underdark"	June 4, 2015	–
Clarota is welcomed back by his illithid community, and immediately turns on Vox Machina. During the running battle, Percy shoots Clarota, and the Elder Brain takes considerable damage but is not destroyed. Tiberius teleports everyone back to Emon, and they return to their home at Greyskull Keep. Tiberius spends some time in Draconia, Kima is freed from her petrification by Pike, and the party learn that the horn of Orcus must now be sealed away in a secure location. Sovereign Uriel sends the party a message summoning them to his presence.
14	"Shopping and Shipping"	June 11, 2015	Laura Bailey and Travis Willingham are in Florida but joined via Skype. Sam Riegel is absent for this episode.
Tiberius returns from Draconia with a Bag of Holding, Kima is returned to Allura and Vox Machina are paid for their exploits. The fate of the horn is discussed by the council, and a plan is agreed for Vox Machina to escort it to Othanzia. Overhearing the Briarwoods' name in the proceedings, Percy is visibly disturbed. The party purchase a range of items at Gilmore's Glorious Goods.
15	"Skyward"	June 25, 2015	Liam O'Brien is in New Jersey but joined via Skype for this episode.
Percy does some tinkering, and Pike heals the lasting damage to Vax's foot from the lava they had encountered earlier. The following morning, Vox Machina board the skyship Deera, to set sail for Vasselheim. On their way the ship is attacked by wyvern riders, but the party repel the assault.
16	"Enter Vasselheim"	July 2, 2015	Liam O'Brien is in New York but joined via Skype for this episode. It was announced that Ashley Johnson would be absent for a block of episodes due to her NY filming schedule.
The airship comes to land in Vasselheim, and the party are escorted to meet Highbearer Vord. The Hall of Exalt below the Platinum Sanctuary has become infested with spiders, and so Vox Machina are hired to clear it out before sealing the Horn away in its depths. When they return to the surface, Pike learns of a recently rediscovered temple to Sarenrae in the city, and decides to stay and restore the temple.
17	"Hubris"	July 23, 2015	Ashley Johnson's first absence for a block of episodes due to her NY filming schedule.
Grog loses a fight in The Crucible, brawling arena in Vasselheim. The next day, while tracking down creatures in the woods outside the city, Vox Machina encounter and fight a hydra – stealing the kill from the hunting guild Slayer's Take. To avoid prosecution as poachers, Vox Machina agrees to be split into two parties to take on hunting trials and retroactively become members of the guild.
18	"Trial of the Take: Part 1"	July 30, 2015	Marisha Ray, Liam O'Brien, Ashley Johnson, Orion Acaba are absent this episode. Guest stars Felicia Day and Mary Elizabeth McGlynn.
Scanlan, Percy, Vex'ahlia, and Grog are teamed up with two guild members, the human wizard Lyra and the tiefling warlock Zahra, to hunt down and harvest a white dragon. After doing some research in the city, the group treks through the Vesper Timberland. In the night, they are attacked by wolves and orcs, however, the group overpower their attackers and interrogate the survivor.
19	"Trial of the Take: Part 2"	August 6, 2015	Marisha Ray, Liam O'Brien, Ashley Johnson, Orion Acaba are absent this episode. Guest stars Felicia Day and Mary Elizabeth McGlynn.
After a northwest push into the mountains, the group negotiates passage by frost giants. Using a spell, Lyra learns that the dragon's name is Rimefang and realizes that other members of the Slayer's Take were killed on a previous contact for this same dragon; this new contract could be a suicide mission. However, the group successfully defeat the dragon in its lair and revive their fallen allies. They return to guild, with all of the required dragon parts, and are welcomed as official members.
20	"Trial of the Take: Part 3"	August 13, 2015	Travis Willingham, Taliesin Jaffe, Ashley Johnson, Laura Bailey, Sam Riegel are absent this episode. Guest stars Will Friedle and Wil Wheaton.
Keyleth, Vax'ildan, and Tiberius are teamed up with two guild members, the human cleric Kashaw Vesh and dwarven fighter Thorbir Falbek, to hunt down a rakshasa. As part of their research, the group consult with the Bastions (city guard) on strangely violent deaths in the city. This leads them to the Velvet Cabaret, a fancy establishment, where a wealthy merchant was residing before his murder. In their investigation, they discover that a rakshasa owns the Velvet Cabaret and then pursue the fiend as it flees through a tunnel underneath its room into a long subterranean tunnel fraught with traps. After overcoming traps, the group is attacked by an unknown creature.
21	"Trial of the Take: Part 4"	August 20, 2015	Travis Willingham, Taliesin Jaffe, Ashley Johnson, Laura Bailey, Sam Riegel are absent this episode. Guest stars Will Friedle and Wil Wheaton.
After defeating an otyugh and then later ghosts, the group partakes in a Heroes' Feast before continuing their pursuit of the rakshasa. The group face a tough battle with the rakshasa before defeating it and harvesting it for parts. Upon return to the guild, Thorbir vouches for their success and they are welcomed as official members. Kashaw, meanwhile, says his farewells before planting a kiss on Keyleth and walking out the door.
22	"Aramente to Pyrah"	August 27, 2015	Sam Riegel is absent this episode.
Vox Machina joyfully reunite at the Slayer's Take before being formally inducted into the guild. Vox Machina follow the Huntmaster Vanessa to a hidden ziggurat below the guild which acts as a temple to Ioun (the goddess of knowledge) where they meet Osysa, a gynosphinx, who magically brands their shoulders with the mark of the Slayer's Take. After some shopping, the group travel to the home of the Fire Ashari in the Sunder Peak mountain and meet with Flamespeaker Cerkonos who confirms Keyleth's mother, Vilya, came through about ten years ago on her own Aramenté. The group passes a trial by combat in the Elemental Plane of Fire; while there they see a huge red dragon pass overhead. After returning to Pyrah, the group celebrate Keyleth's success before Pike returns to her temple.
23	"The Rematch"	September 10, 2015	Ashley Johnson is absent this episode.
Before leaving Vasselheim, Grog wins a rematch at The Crucible; his fight is observed by the Dawn Marshal Earthbreaker Groon. After concluding their business in the city, Vox Machina return to Greyskull Keep in Emon where they discover a young man, Kynan Leore, has been camping in front of their home for two weeks in order to meet them. Kynan wants to join their group; Vax, to make a point, strikes him with the pommel of a dagger and knocks him out in a single hit. After waking him up, Vax offers to mentor him if Kynan improves his training and returns. Seeker Assum Emring meets with the group to inform them that in a week there will be a celebration with Lord and Lady Briarwood of Whitestone to mark the construction of a bridge between Tal'Dorei and Wildemount. Assum noticed Percy's discomfort the last time the Briarwoods were mentioned, which matched up with Assum's own reservations about the couple and the group is invited to this celebratory dinner.
24	"The Feast"	September 17, 2015	Ashley Johnson is absent for a block of episodes due to her NY filming schedule.
Percy explains to Vox Machina that the Briarwoods are responsible for the deaths of everyone in his family. The only survivors of the attack inside Castle Whitestone were traitors and Percy wants revenge, which is what drove him to create his guns—the names of the five conspirators from the coup are engraved on the barrels of his pistol: Lord Briarwood, Lady Briarwood, Dr. Anna Ripley, Sir Stonefell, and Professor Anders. The party run several errands: Vax buys enchanted daggers for Kynan only to discover Kynan has left the city; Tiberius, Grog, Vex, and Scanlan teleport to Kraghammer to get a price for repairing their flying carpet and retrieve payment for their Underdark venture; and Grog starts to grow a beard due to the Belt of Dwarvenkind. Vox Machina attend the dinner party with Percy disguised as Vax. During dinner the Briarwoods explain how they "inherited" Whitestone from the de Rolo family. After a tense dinner, Vax stealthy follows the Briarwoods, takes down a guard and enters their guest suite. However, Vax is discovered by the Briarwoods, and ends up paralyzed after failing to bluff his way out and before he could say the emergency code word "Jenga".
25	"Crimson Diplomacy"	September 24, 2015	Guest stars Kit Buss.
Vax overcomes the paralysis and charm spells, only to be attacked by the Briarwoods – Lady Briarwood uses necrotic magic and Lord Briarwood appears to be a vampire. Vax escapes by jumping out a second-story window while yelling "Jenga" into his magical earpiece. Vox Machina gather weapons and search for Vax; Seeker Assum and Lillith Daturai, a tiefling wizard, also join the fight against the Briarwoods but Seeker Assum ends up charmed by Lord Briarwood. Lord and Lady Briarwood retreat and, before teleporting away, they sarcastically invite Percy to visit his family in Whitestone. After the fight, Lillith explains that she is Zahra's cousin who suggested that Vox Machina could aid her in her fight against the bounty hunter known as "The Broker" who was hired by her sisters. Vox Machina successfully kill "The Broker" (who Lillith then reanimates to send back to her sisters); however, during the fight Tiberius killed an older civilian woman.
26	"Consequences and Cows"	October 1, 2015	Taliesin Jaffe is absent this episode
Percy stays at Greyskull Keep while the rest of Vox Machnia answer a summons from Sovereign Uriel Tal'Dorei. Uriel demands that they explain their attack on formal guests of the palace, the torture of the guests' carriage driver, and the death of an elderly woman. During their account of the situation, Vax shows his bite wound and Keyleth explains that Lord Briarwood charmed Seeker Assum. Keyleth uses a restoration spell on Assum, but Assum pretends that the magic had no effect. Sovereign Uriel temporarily revokes Vox Machnia's membership on the Council of Tal'Dorei until a formal investigation is completed. Afterwards, Allura explains that they only have a few weeks to prove their innocence. Vox Machnia free the carriage driver who details the situation in Whitestone. Not only was Percy's family executed but the other nobles of Whitestone were replaced by mercenaries and also killed, as was anyone who objected to their rule. The carriage driver notes he was pressed into service, that he has only seen Lady Briarwood walk in daylight, and that the castle is a place of sacrilege magics. As a diversion, the party (without Percy) resolve a nearby job where a roc is preying on livestock.
27	"The Path to Whitestone"	October 8, 2015	Last appearance of Orion Acaba.
Vox Machina fend off an attack in their keep; Vax believes the Invisible Stalkers were sent by the Briarwoods. Seeker Assum infiltrates the keep to explain that he is pretending to be charmed so he can investigate who else might have been impacted by the Briarwoods' magic. Assum says he suspects Sovereign Uriel has been charmed, and he is going to soon head for Wildemount to investigate the Briarwoods' origins. During the party's discussion, Percy begins to hear a whispered voice repeating the word "vengeance" and once by himself, Percy agrees with the voice. The party prepares to head to Whitestone by enchanting items, brewing potions and Tiberius sends a letter to his father requesting the aid of the Draconian army in order to support Percy, however, the request is denied. The party then teleport to Westruun and while on the mountain path through the Alabaster Sierras, they are attacked by serpentine creatures.
28	"The Sun Tree"	October 15, 2015	Tiberius was played by Matthew Mercer as Orion Acaba was not present.
Vox Machina continue on their way after defeating the creatures and discover a stone giant fortresses which they determine was attacked two to three months ago by the dried blood pools; Tiberius teleports away to pursue another idea. On the outskirts of Whitestone, they decide to rest in trees after they hear wolves while Keyleth in eagle form takes Scanlan to invisibly scout the city. Most buildings are shut, crops are failing, the few people in the city give a wide berth to the undead giants that are patrolling, and there are eight bodies hanging from the Sun Tree. Percy explains that the Sun Tree is a representation of the sun god Pelor. The next day, the party utilize magic to disguise themselves to infiltrate the city and head to see the Sun Tree; Vox Machina realize the eight bodies are effigies of themselves. The party regroup in a nearby abandoned tavern where Keyleth digs until she finds the Sun Tree's roots and discovers the tree is dead. After Keyleth prepares a Heroes' Feast for Vox Machina, she begins casting an eight-hour long spell to attempt reviving the tree.
29	"Whispers"	October 22, 2015	–
The party split up; Vex and Grog protect Keyleth, whilst the rest investigate the nearby graveyard temple. Entering, they discover the temple vandalized, the priest of Pelor dead, and find a half-burned note that seems to discuss the discovery of Percy being in Emon. Percy investigates the altar closer, finding components similar to what he uses to make gun ammunition. On their way back, they discover a Sir Kerrion has been issuing impossible decrees to the townsfolk and that Keyleth is unable to revive the tree because something even further down is sucking the life out of it. The next day, still disguised as peasants, the party attend a sermon at the temple to the lawbearer god Erathis where Percy gives a prayer for outside forces to bring salvation and then slips a parchment to the Erathis Keeper Yennen. The party then infiltrate Sir Kerrion's house, kill him, defeat his guards and interrogate a survivor who emphasizes that Lady Briarwood is the scariest and that the Briarwoods have a project room beneath the castle; Vox Machina then light the house on fire, leave the survivors tied up outside it, and stealth back to the tavern as warning bells ring.
30	"Stoke the Flames"	October 29, 2015	Orion Acaba's departure from the show was announced immediately before this episode.
On being questioned about the smoke that emanated from his body and his heightened levels of violence during the fight; Percy explains that a year after the Briarwoods' coup he had a dream that asking if he wanted the means to achieve revenge in exchange for the souls of those he would kill. He awoke with the idea of creating his first gun, but that it was just a dream. Although not convinced, the party decide they will save him if he goes too far. In the night, the party fend off a vampire attack before splitting up to find a new hideout. After attending another sermon, Keeper Yennen asks the party to follow him for a discussion where he explains that other community leaders are not yet onboard due to previous failed rebellions and that an informant told them that a ziggurat beneath the city is being repurposed for evil. Percy recognizes another man in the room as Archibald Desnay, his father's chancellor, and drops his magical disguise. Archibald explains that their informant inside the castle is Cassandra de Rolo - Percy's surviving sister - who is being forced to serve the Brairwoods. Vox Machina determine their next plan of action.
31	"Gunpowder Plot"	November 5, 2015	–
Scanlan manages to hold off Duke Goran Vedmeyer and his forces while lighting the mansion on fire but it requires him using most of spells and the Duke escapes; the rest of Vox Machina successfully kill the vampire Count Tylieri and his guards. Vex notices smoke circling Percy's ankles who then deflects and reassures Vex that he is fine when he is not. Vox Machina regroup as civilians begin to fight the undead giants and then head for the Sun Tree. After more battle, the party starts to flee the area as they notice a skeleton army pouring into the streets.
32	"Against the Tide of Bone"	November 12, 2015	Ashley Johnson, during Blindspot's production hiatus, joined via Skype for this episode.
Vox Machina fend off waves of undead with the help of Pike who has appeared as a not entirely solid apparition of herself via divine magic. The party then splits up to take on more undead giants with support of the civilian militia. Regrouping, they then head for the castle's secret entrance about an hour away and Pike casts Greater Restoration on Percy which removes some of corruption but Percy is not ready to let go of his desire for revenge. They campout near the entrance to recover, and in the morning, Pike prepares a Heroes’ Feast. The secret tunnel leads to the dungeons and they discover an older woman imprisoned who begs for aid. Suspicious of the woman, Vex intentionally breaks her lockpick in the lock resulting in the woman's anger who then grabs Vex's hands with both of her hands, however, Vex feels only one hand.
33	"Reunions"	November 19, 2015	–
Vox Machina reveal that the illusioned, imprisoned woman is in fact Dr. Anna Ripley; Ripley is then freed under strict conditions to help the party reach Cassandra. Percy and Ripley exchange jabs on gun designs and Ripley baits Percy by informing him that Cassandra would be with Professor Anders; this is a trap and in the ensuing fight Anders gravely injures Cassandra, Percy kills Anders whose name then vanishes from his gun barrel, Ripley escapes and as the danger fades, Vax confesses his love to Keyleth before kissing her. As the party gathers documents & other evidence to clear their names in Emon, Cassandra explains her survival and her capture two years later during the first failed rebellion. After arming up, the party and Cassandra head to the undercroft where they fight a series of ghosts before delving further into a recently-dug tunnel.
34	"Race to the Ziggurat"	December 3, 2015	Ashley Johnson joined via Skype for this episode.
Pike's avatar manifests once again and the party continues further into the trapped tunnel system. Eventually, they reach a room where Cassandra presses a secret button that traps Vox Machina within the center of the room and the Briarwoods reveal themselves. In Vax's escape attempt, he sets off an acid trap on the rest of Vox Machina; Cassandra tells Percy that she is now a Briarwood and has a destiny with the "Whispered One". After they escape, Percy notices his gun barrel now displays the name "Cassandra de Rolo". The party stealth up the ziggurat and then in the ensuing fight, Lord Briarwood is killed after being pushed into his mist form. Lady Briarwood attempts to set of the ritual early which begins to impact everyone's ability to cast magic before she and Vex are knocked unconscious.
35	"Denouement"	December 10, 2015	Ashley Johnson joined via Skype for this episode.
Vox Machina flee the ziggurat as the anti-magic field pulses; outside of the field, healing magic brings Vex to consciousness. Percy interrogates Cassandra who says she has no idea of the ritual's true purpose, however, Scanlan manages to recall a being called Vecna. Percy begins to talk out loud to the voice within his head which has been urging him to kill both Lady Briarwood and Cassandra. Vox Machina readies for a fight as a smoke creature manifests from Percy's gun and the creature warns Percy not to double cross Orthax. During the fight with the creature, Lady Briarwood attempts to escape and after the fight, Percy instructs Cassandra to kill Lady Briarwood. Scanlan uses magic to grab Percy's gun and drop it into an acid vat; as it is dissolves, the cold core within Percy is extinguished. The citizens of Whitestone begin to celebrate after winning their freedom and Vox Machina begin to coordinate next steps with Keeper Yennen.
36	"Winter's Crest in Whitestone"	December 17, 2015	A summary of the pre-Kraghammer campaign is played during the break.
In the two weeks leading up to the holiday of Winter's Crest, Vox Machina secure the ziggurat and help rebuild Whitestone. Percy discovers that Lord Briarwood's sword has a voice so he trades it to Grog for another weapon. Grog immediately accepts the offer of power from the sword's voice. On Winter's Crest, Vox Machina participate in multiple festival competitions. Privately, Percy, Cassandra and Keeper Yennen discuss the future of the city. Percy proposes that the city be led by a five-person council – a leader of the citizens, a leader of the wider farming community, an economic leader, Keeper Yennen, and Cassandra. Percy does not consider himself fit to rule and has other affairs to focus on. Later, Vex and Vax discuss Keyleth avoiding Vax while Keyleth and Percy discuss a reminder of giving into darkness.

=== 2016 ===
List of episodes in 2016
Episode	Title	Original release date	Notes
37	"A Musician's Nostalgia"	January 7, 2016	Ashley Johnson returned to play in-person for this episode. Tiberius was played by Matthew Mercer as Orion Acaba was not present.
Before returning to Emon, Percy rebuilds Dr. Ripley's pistol. Vox Machina discover both Pike and Tiberius at Greyskull Keep; after spending time in self-reflection, Tiberius explains he has failed as diplomat, he is not respected by his family in Draconia and his personal mission to recover magical artifacts has become stagnant. The party has a sentimental farewell as Tiberius has decided to leave Vox Machina. Vox Machina then meet with Sovereign Uriel and Seeker Assum to discuss the Briarwoods. Assum has discovered that the Briarwoods were accused of necromancy six years ago, thought to have been killed by a mob except Assum was able to trace them to Port Damali a few months after their "deaths". Uriel confirms that Vox Machina is not at fault and restores them to the council as his mind is no longer clouded by the Briarwoods. The party reveals paperwork that shows council member Riskel Daxio is a traitor; after the meeting, Vox Machina track Daxio down, capture him and discover he worships Vecna. During their investigation, Scanlan encounters his former company, Dr. Dranzel's Spectacular Traveling Troupe, and lets a young gnome woman win a flute duel against him.
38	"Echoes of the Past"	January 14, 2016	Ashley Johnson joined via Skype for this episode.
Vox Machina return Daxio to Sovereign Uriel who sentences him to immediate execution; Grog beheads him. During an evening pub crawl, Vox Machina encounter Gilmore who shares his knowledge of the archlich Vecna. While they get drunk, Vax has a privateFFa conversation with Gilmore where he tells Gilmore they cannot be together anymore because he has fallen in love with someone else that he thinks does not love him. Upon returning to Greyskull Keep, they discover that their guards have allowed Scanlan's former troupe inside. Scanlan is confronted by the gnome woman Kaylie and discovers she is his daughter. Kaylie cannot bring herself to kill him and Scanlan hugs her while apologizing for not knowing of her existence. The next morning, Vox Machina decide to reinvestigate the home of another council traitor, General Krieg. A year ago, they had discovered he was actually the blue dragon Brimscythe and killed him. They find a jeweled humanoid skull before heading to a magically connected secret cave where Vex determines the partially collapsed cavern system was ravaged by another dragon. Vex begins to scoop up leftover gold before the party is attacked by a giant wormlike creature with multiple rows of teeth.
39	"Omens"	January 21, 2016	–
The party successfully defeats two giant wormlike creatures in Brimscythe's lair before narrowly escaping the mother worm. Vax confronts Grog about why he has been talking to his sword. Grog privately confesses to Pike that the skull spoke to him and promised him a Wish. Using magic, Pike determines the skull is evil so they agree to take it and lock it in Percy's lab. Vex and Scanlan ask Uriel to put a guard around Krieg's home until they can investigate further. Scanlan goes to break his daughter out of the stockade. Later that afternoon, Vox Machina attends a proclamation outside the palace. Uriel announces his surprise abdication. During this, the city is attacked by four dragons of varying colors: green, white, red, and black. In the distance, they see Allura's tower destroyed. The green dragon Raishan attacks the crowd; the black dragon Umbrasyl joins in before the larger red dragon directs the other dragons to leave and complete their tasks to establish the domain of the Chroma Conclave. The party flees to Greyskull Keep via Keyleth's magic leaving the council and Gilmore behind while the red dragon lights the Cloudtop District on fire.
40	"Desperate Measures"	January 28, 2016	–
Vox Machina tries to help civilians by letting them into their keep, however, the white dragon Vorugal begins his attack on them. After a skirmish, they watch as the massive red dragon, Thordak, flings Vorugal away warning him that Emon is his. The other dragons head east while Thordak announces to the city that they now serve him. Meanwhile, Grog remembers the mysterious skull that has whispered about granting a Wish. Grog insists that they use the skull to Wish the dragons away which leads to a tense argument in the group. Allura then shows up having felt the severing of the Emon teleportation circle; she has also felt the severing to Westruun's sigils. She states that the skull is extremely dangerous. She outlines what she knows of the named dragons including that she and Kima were the surviving members of the group that sealed Thordak away to the Plane of Fire; Thordak's previous reign of terror included the destruction of the twins' childhood home and the death of their mother. Keyleth's Scry reveals that the people of the Fire Ashari have been decimated. They decide their next step is to assess the survival of allies.
41	"In Ruins"	February 4, 2016	Guest stars Jason C. Miller.
Allura heads to Westruun where she hopes a well-fortified library will have more information on the Chroma Conclave. Keyleth uses magic to determine that Gilmore is alive; Vox Machina decides they need to sleep. In the morning, Vex gives Jarett funds to take care of the refugees. Utilizing the secret tunnels under Greyskull Keep, they travel into the city to assess the situation. After befriending Garthok, a half-orc rogue, they are shown to a secret entrance of the thieves' guild known as the Clasp. Vox Machina dispatch looters at Gilmore's shop; Sherri then guides them to the cellar below where a weak Gilmore is along with Empress Salda Tal'Dorei, Uriel's wife, and their three children. Pike heals Gilmore who states he prioritized saving the children, Salda, Speaker Assum and Tofor Brotoras. Uriel attempted to save others. When Gilmore returned later, he found Uriel's body. The party splits up with half escorting Gilmore and the refugees to the keep. Vex, Scanlan, and Garthok head to the Clasp stash location which they discover has been looted; townsfolk are looting everywhere to make tribute to Thordak. Garthok heads to the Clasp to set up a meeting. At Greyskull Keep, they consider next steps.
42	"Dangerous Dealings"	February 11, 2016	–
The party debates making an alliance with the Clasp. Keyleth and Pike utilize Scry to assess the situation across Exandria; Vasselheim, Whitestone, and the Air Ashari seem untouched. Syngorn has vanished – the city possibly retreated to the Feywild. Vox Machina determine they cannot hold Greyskull Keep so Keyleth uses magic to transport Percy and some refugees to Whitestone. Percy talks to Cassandra about the progress of studying the black orb under the castle before transporting back to Emon. On the way to the Clasp, Vox Machina defeat lizardfolk riding wyverns. Vax reveals to Vex that he had a previous deal with the Clasp; a Clasp patron wanted her but he was able to exchange someone else by agreeing to be branded by Clasp and that he would answer their call as needed. While meeting with the Clasp, they are unable to reach a deal resulting in the Clasp declaring Vax and the rest enemies. Vax has Keyleth burn the Clasp brand off; they then spend the night together in Keyleth's bedroom. In the morning, they magically transport the last of the refugees (including Gilmore, Salda, Salda's children, and the keep's staff) to Whitestone before magically transporting to Vasselheim.
43	"Return to Vasselheim"	February 18, 2016	Guest stars Will Friedle and Mary Elizabeth McGlynn.
In Vasselheim, Vox Machina reunites with Kashaw and Zahra at the Slayer's Take. After a discussion with Huntmaster Vanessa, she leads them below the guild to a secret temple of Ioun where its guardian sphinx, Osysa, resides. Osysa informs Vox Machina of powerful divine items, called the Vestiges of the Divergence, which could aid the party in their fight. She also informs them of the Chroma Conclave's expansion past Westruun to Draconia which the dragons destroyed. Later, Vox Machina heads to the Platinum Sanctuary; only Lady Kima will provide aid. Afterwards, Grog seeks out Earthbreaker Groon, which leads to a fight between Groon and Grog, Vax & Scanlan. Groon pushes Grog to force him to determine the source of his strength. During the fight, the sword Craven Edge will not allow Grog to switch weapons. Grog determines his strength comes from his friends. Following the fight, Groon informs them of two Vestiges – Kord's Titanstone Knuckles and The Raven Queen's Deathwalker's Ward. Although he does not know the location of Kord's Vestige, Groon states that The Raven Queen's champion last held her Vestige and was lain to rest in the west. The champion's tomb is now a sunken ruin.
44	"The Sunken Tomb"	March 10, 2016	Guest stars Will Friedle and Mary Elizabeth McGlynn.
Grog informs everyone else that he believes his uncle has the Titanstone Knuckles, however, he does not know where the roving raiders his uncle leads are. Kashaw, Zahra, and Kima join Vox Machina in their trip to the Marrowglade Loch where the sunken tomb is located. They explore the area and spend the night before discovering the entrance by displacing the water of the lake. Their exploration of the tomb leads to a lengthy battle with a beholder leaving the group battered. Percy, with Trinket's help, pushes open the sarcophagus. Vex notices Percy interacting with it and goes to make sure it is safe. However, Percy does not wait before attempting to remove the armor from the body within the sarcophagus which sets off a trap that only Percy is able to avoid – Vex is killed instantly. Vax is horrified; Kashaw begins the Revivify ritual. In the final part of the ritual, Vax offers himself to the Raven Queen in exchange for his sister's life. A dark specter of the Raven Queen approaches and nods at Vax as the ritual successfully brings Vex back to life. They take the armor and head to Whitestone, via Keyleth's magic, to regroup.
45	"Those Who Walk Away"	March 17, 2016	–
Keeper Yennen identifies the items recovered from the tomb. In addition to outlining properties of the armor, Yennen says the amulet is magically holding a living creature inside of it. Vex recalls from her research that the Champion had an ally named Galdric. Percy apologizes to Vex for his carelessness; Vex later gets the full details of the ritual from Keyleth – including Vax's exchange. Grog has an unsettling private conversation with his sword where the sword states Grog satiates its hunger. Keyleth and Vax discuss the events of the tomb – Vax's symbol of Sarenrae is now cracked. Keyleth admits her love to Vax but also her fear that she'll lose him. In the morning, Vex discovers Vax sleeping in front of her door. After they discuss the ritual, she gives Vax the Deathwalker's Ward. Later, Vox Machina releases the wolf Galdric who agrees to guard Whitestone until the danger passes. Vex uses the now empty amulet to store Trinket. Vox Machina then head to the Fire Ashari settlement of Pyrah to search for survivors. This is where Thordak was sealed away and then brought back. They run into Keyleth's father Korrin who is also there aiding survivors.
46	"Cindergrove Revisited"	March 24, 2016	Guest stars Chris Hardwick.
The portal to the Plane of Fire remains open at the center of the caldera. Cerkonos, headmaster of the Fire Ashari, informs them that the Ashari need to divide forces to face the imminent threat of the rift. During an encounter with some undead, Vox Machina meet the dragonborn necromancer Gern Blanston; these undead are his thralls. Gern joins them as they proceed to the rift; they fight various fire elementals along the way. The biggest threat is the efreeti, also known as a fire genie. During that battle, Gern uses a flying broom which he later hands off to Vex. Vex stealthily stashes it in the Bag of Holding and apologizes to Gern about losing the broom in the lava – Gern believes her lie. With the path to the rift cleared, Keyleth signals the Ashari. The Ashari along with Gern and Vox Machina are able to seal the rift after layering multiple magical techniques. Korrin later tells Keyleth how proud he is of what she has been able to accomplish – he also entreats her to finish her Aramenté. Korrin plans to continue helping the Fire Ashari with their reconstruction effort.
47	"The Family Business"	March 31, 2016	–
Scanlan casts Mordenkainen's Magnificent Mansion – everyone, including the Ashari, spend the night inside. Cerkonos informs Keyleth that Raishan disguised herself as an orphaned human in order to be adopted by the Ashari. Raishan used this access to free Thordak. Vax has a vision from the Raven Queen where he faces the web of life. Holding the thread of his life, she offers her fate-touched champion choices: "Rebirth or ruin. Maker or martyr. Conqueror, tyrant, or nothing". As the thread snaps, Vax plummets. Grog dreams of Craven Edge driving him to cut down foes who turn into innocent people including Pike – Grog then sees Kevdak and the Herd of Storms bowing to him. Vox Machina head out in the morning and travel over Westruun. Speaking with a forced laborer leads to questioning a guard; they discover that the Herd of Storms has bowed to the black dragon. Grog kills the guard with Craven Edge. Grog confides in Scanlan about his sword. Using magic, Scanlan gets the sword; it tells Scanlan to kill the laborer to prove his worth. Scanlan informs Grog that he is consulting with Pike. The party decides to head to Osysa's mate first before Grog challenges Kevdak one-on-one.
48	"Into the Frostweald"	April 7, 2016	–
Vox Machina head to the base of the mountains where they find a refugee tent city. They have history with some of the refugees. The leader Cornelius will not take them up on the offer to evacuate to Whitestone until scouts, who are hunting orcs, return. Vox Machina agree to find them as it is on their way. Pike rejoins the party; Scanlan updates her on his concerns about Craven Edge. Vex tells Vax that based on her research, the Raven Queen's commandments make her seem alright. She thinks it could be a wonderful thing to be a god's champion; Vax says he'll consider it. They continue on the next day and encounter basilisks. After they defeat them, Vax realizes the cartographer Tyriok is one of the statues; Pike casts Greater Restoration to free him from the petrification, however, he loses the arm which had broken off when he was a statue. Vax takes a moment away to ask the Raven Queen for more guidance than nightmares. He immediately has a vision of the Vasselheim temple to the Raven Queen – then within the temple, the god rises from a pool of red liquid and beckons him before the vision ends.
49	"A Name Is Earned"	April 14, 2016	–
Tyriok acts as guide. After a fight with orcs, Vox Machina free their prisoners. Grog has been avoiding sleep as this allows him to build up the strength granted by Craven Edge when Grog kills. The refugees stay in Scanlan's Mansion while the party scouts. Everyone spends the night within the Mansion. Grog asks Craven Edge about the Briarwoods but it does not know about their Vecna plans. Grog then asks about what happens if the sword is full; it suggests Grog find out. Grog lies about sleeping to the party. Tyriok leads the refugees to the tent city while Vox Machina continues to a mountain cavern. A perilous search leads them to the sphinx who will not grant them knowledge until they earn it by saying his name. They fight the sphinx while attempting to solve the puzzle by entering different, harmful, elemental zones that contain letters. It takes four attempts but Percy eventually yells "Kamaljiori" which ends the fight. Kamaljiori gives the party the Mythcarver sword, a Vestige last wielded by the master bard known as the White Duke. He reveals the locations of six other Vestiges but warns others are also hunting for them.
50	"Best Laid Plans..."	April 21, 2016	–
Outside of Kamaljiori's temple, Vox Machina take a moment to rest. Grog suddenly collapses – there are no signs of life. Scanlan is concerned that the sword Craven Edge has stolen Grog's soul. Pike begins the Revivify ritual; Vax and Scanlan contribute to the ritual before Percy threatens the sword and summons his own shadowy mist which faces off the screaming within the sword. Grog comes back to life; Vox Machina votes to banish the sword. Pike uses divine magic to break the sword's connection to Grog and then Keyleth casts Plane Shift on it to send it away. The party heads to the tent city where Cornelius confirms everyone's safety; the refugees plan to go to Kymal. On the outskirts of Westruun, Vox Machina discovers the laborer they had previously spoken to is dead and strung up in the field. Pike casts Speak With Dead; the laborer hid their involvement and took the blame for the guard's death. The next day they split up to scout the city; Scanlan sets off alarms in the Margrave's house but escapes via the Dimension Door spell to a nearby temple where he discovers Dr. Dranzel and Kaylie.
51	"Test of Pride"	April 28, 2016	–
Within the ruined temple, Scanlan and Kaylie utilize magic to hide themselves, Dr. Dranzel, and some refugees from investigating goliaths. Meanwhile, the rest of the party ends up in a fight with members of the Herd of Storms. Scanlan casts the illusion Seeming to get everyone to the sewers, however, they also come into conflict with the guard. Kaylie causes the guard to fall asleep – Scanlan directs Dr. Dranzel to get the group to safety outside of Westruun. Vox Machina reconvenes and adjusts their plan as it appears the Herd is using townspeople as a meat shield. The party casts various beneficial magic on Grog as he will challenge his uncle Kevdak. Grog turns himself in to the Herd while the rest stealthily follow along; Grog is led to the town square. After a verbal confrontation with various members of the herd, Grog challenges Kevdak who steps out onto the balcony of the Margrave's house. Kevdak is wearing the Titanstone Knuckles. A brutal battle unfolds with Kevdak dealing serious damage to Grog. Grog finally pretends to be defeated and sinks to his knees – he then signals the others to attack by shouting, "Vox Machina! Fuck shit up!"
52	"The Kill Box"	May 5, 2016	–
Vox Machina and members of the Herd begin to fight leading to a massive battle of attrition; many members of Vox Machina are fighting from the air. Scanlan tips the scale in their favor by casting Hold Person on Kevdak which paralyzes him. One by one, Vox Machina throw bullets, spells, and weapons at Kevdak and the Herd. The party manages to nearly cut off both of Kevdak's arms while he was paralyzed which left him nearly useless when he breaks the spell. The Herd seer gets a spell off which restores Kevdak's right arm. A badly wounded Vex drops Grog from the sky who crashes down upon his uncle with his own axe bisecting Kevdak. The fight with the Herd ends – the Herd then brings forward Kevdak's son Zanror who is in shackles. Grog takes the Titanstone Knuckles and grants leadership of the Herd to Zanror. Together, they rally the Herd with the promise of ridding Westrunn of the black dragon that claimed both the city and the Herd. Vox Machina begins to clean up after the fight including gathering the dead. Pike casts Raise Dead to restore a civilian child who was caught in the fight.
53	"At Dawn, We Plan!"	May 12, 2016	–
Vox Machina returns the child to his mother and Grog asks them to evacuate to the refugee camp before a fight ensues in Westrunn. Vex asks for information on how to find Reginald's daughter. Vox Machina then arrive at the home of Wilhand, Pike's great-great-grandfather. They find a secret hiding place in the pantry, where Wilhand is found hiding. They update him on what the latest events before taking him into Scanlan's magic mansion. Scanlan reveals to Wilhand he wishes to propose to Pike. The group debate whether they are ready to attack the dragon at Westrunn, and what to do with the townsfolk and the Goliath herd. Upon ransacking a house with multiple traps, the group find the circlet, which gives Keyleth the ability to control a Golem they discover in the house. Keyleth names it Fastbender. Scanlan takes Vax into the sewers to track down Kaylie, but she has fled the city. Scanlan proposes to Pike, and the two talk about the letter Scanlan gave her. Keyleth tests out the control she has over the golem. At dawn, the group meet with Zanror and convince him to delay the dragon fight so they can all prepare.
54	"In the Belly of the Beast"	May 19, 2016	–
Vox Machina spend the day preparing for their battle against the black dragon, Umbrasyl. Percy creates a large mousetrap-like structure, Keyleth digs hidden trenches, Vex covers their tracks and Grog frees some prisoners from the jail. There he finds Reginald's daughter Amelia. That night, the group have a Hero's Feast and attune their magical items in preparation for the battle the next day. The next day, the Goliath Herd and Vox Machina lay in wait for Umbrasyl. The dragon lands on the baited gold pile, releasing Percy's trap, and along with the iron chains held by the Goliath, Umbrasyl finds himself pinned to the ground. As the battle ensures, most of the Herd are lost to the acid attack of the dragon, while Scanlan and a miniature Vax use Dimension Door to transport themselves to the inside of Umbrasyl. From inside Umbrasyl's stomach, Scanlan activates the Immovable Rod. After taking heavy damage, Umbrasyl takes off, with the rod ripping out the side of him. Percy, Vex, Pike and Keyleth watch on in horror as the dragon flies away, with Scanlan and Vax still inside, and Grog being dragged along behind.
55	"Umbrasyl"	June 2, 2016	Guest stars Chris Perkins.
As Umbrasyl flies away, Grog attempts to climb up on to his back, Vax cuts his way out of Umbrasyl's muscle and Scanlan uses Bigby's Hand to push through the skin of the dragon. Umbrasyl turns invisible and manages to throw off all three members of Vox Machina from his body. As Vax falls, he pledges allegiance to the Raven Queen as part of his Paladin multi-class. Quick thinking Scanlan manages to save everyone by polymorphing Grog into a Giant Eagle. The rest of the group catch up and they all regroup at the bottom of Gatshadow Mountain. There, they meet Shale, an elderly female Goliath fighter from Grog's Herd, who is the only survivor of a dragon hunting party. She leads Vox Machina up the mountain to Umbrasyl's lair. The group continue their attack on the black dragon, and eventually Grog deals the final death blow. The episode ends with the group looking over the dragon's treasure hoard, and dissecting Umbrasyl's body.
56	"Hope"	June 9, 2016	Guest stars Patrick Rothfuss.
Vox Machina loot Umbraysl and rest in the Magnificent Mansion. Vex and Vax argue over who has ownership of the Boots of Haste, culminating in a fight late at night where Vax concedes after Vex questions his relationship with Keyleth. The next day, the entire party, bar Vax, have a cannonball contest in the spa which Percy wins, being the only one to draw blood. Vox Machina return to the herd where they are burning the dead, and gain the control circlet for a golem they name Fassbender. They befriend Kerrek, a human blacksmith and relay Reginald's sacrifice to his daughter, Amelia. After holding a celebration and eulogy, they begin preparing bunkers and escape routes. Scanlan reunites with Kaylie who makes him promise not to die in the upcoming battles. Eventually, the party open a portal to Vasselheim and head through.
57	"Duskmeadow"	June 16, 2016	–
Vox Machina decide to run errands, first heading to the Slayer's Take for materials and directions. Percy, Grog and Scanlan go to Victor's to buy black powder, discovering Anna Ripley was recently in town. The rest of the group arrive at the Raven Queen's Temple where Vax dives into a pool of blood and speaks with the Raven Queen. They discuss Vax's duty, destiny and life. Grog and Scanlan go clothes shopping. As Percy returns, he veers to the Temple and, also in the pool of blood, communes with the Raven Queen. Vex realizes this upon his return. The next day, the party head to Whitestone and check on their friends, such as Zahra and Gilmore. Everyone gathers for dinner where Allura provides all of the known information about the Chroma Conclave. Vex and Percy go on a walk where they discuss the Raven Queen and Whitestone renovations. After a bit, everyone goes to bed although Vax warns Vex about Percy and Gilmore arrives. He gifts Vax a robe and asks to go for a walk, as they do Gilmore accuses Vax of breaking his heart and stabs him, suddenly morphing into a creature with fur and whiskers.
58	"A Cycle of Vengeance"	June 23, 2016	–
As Vax is attacked by the Gilmore-looking Rakshasa, the rest of Vox Machina awake to assassins, with most members of the group without their armor or weapons. Vax tackles the Rakshasa off the balcony into the courtyard, where Vox Machina regroups. Pike is able to kill the Rakshasa, who vows he will return. Afterwards, Vax tries to take off the robe given to him by the Rakshasa but finds that it flays his skin. Quick thinking Percy takes him down to the Ziggurat where he is able to safely take off the robe within the anti-magic field. Vox Machina learn that the Rakshasa will reform in the Nine Hells and eventually come for them again. The next morning, Keyleth and Pike are able to remove a curse placed upon Vax. Vax also learns from Gilmore about the qualities of his Vestige armor, which now includes wings for flight. Keyleth and Pike talk about how they are confused about their feelings for others, but Pike encourages Keyleth to be with Vax. Scanlan also talks to Pike, rescinding his proposal and they agree to just be friends. The episode ends with the group heading to the Feywild, while Pike remains in Whitestone.
59	"Into the Feywild"	July 7, 2016	Liam O'Brien joined via video call for this episode.
Arriving in the Feywild, Keyleth picks a flower, alerting Nahla, the Nymph from Grog's past. She gives some advice for how to survive in the Feywild in exchange for the Raven Queen book from Vex. The group trek through the forest and open grass field, before discovering a Satyr named Garmelie, who has been trailing them. They take him into Scanlan's magic mansion, where he charms Percy and makes a deal with Vox Machina. In exchange for guiding them to the Shademurk Bog where the Vestige bow is, Vox Machina must fix his pan flute, and steal something from the Elven city of Syngorn. Percy easily fixes the musical instrument, and after resting, the group make their way to Syngorn.
60	"Heredity and Hats"	July 14, 2016	This episode was recorded live at the Landmark Theatre in Los Angeles. Ashley Johnson is absent for this episode.
Upon entering Syngorn, Garmelie becomes invisible and Vax and Vex lead the group to their father Syldor's house. There they meet Syldor's new wife and their half-sister. After an awkward conversation with Syldor over tea, he gives them a letter with access to some areas of the city and a meeting with the High Warden of Syngorn. Percy gives Vex a Ladyship title for Whitestone. While at their accommodation for the night, the group realize that Pike’s design form is fading and disappears. The group then talk with Garmelie, who asks them to steal a piece of a threshold crest and the High Warden’s hat. Vox Machina then met with the High Warden. Vax and Vex fail to persuade her to give them part of a threshold crest, but Scanlan successfully deceives her into letting them view her hat collection, where Vax steals a hat. Later, Percy and Keyleth trick Garmelie into accepting their fake threshold crest. They then head out of Syngorn towards the Shademurk Bog. They discover a cave with offerings outside in the Moonbrush Forest, which Keyleth disturbs. Suddenly, both Keyleth and Vex are confronted by a giant guardian spirit bear but are rescued by Trinket.
61	"Denizens of the Moonbrush"	July 28, 2016	Ashley Johnson is absent for this episode.
As the group continue, they hear music. After investigating, Vax and Scanlan become charmed, however Vex and Grog rescue them. Vox Machina come across a pack of lycanthrope, and their leader requests that they destroy a Pixie city in exchange for safe passage. The group investigate the Pixie area, and upon approaching, Keyleth casts Hallucinatory Terrain so that the city appears destroyed. The group then flee to the edge of the forest, but run into an impenetrable, invisible wall. The Lycan leader is angered by their deception, leaving them to be trapped in the forest. That night while resting, Keyleth follows a couple of Pixies that are scouting the area. In the morning, Vox Machina are met by a group of Pixies. Their leader is suspicious of the group, and turns Grog into stone as punishment for their deception. A battle ensues and Vox Machina are able to kill all but one Pixie, who tries to flee, but is caught and squished by the Lycan leader. The Lycan leader offers his assistance if the group needs it in the Shademurk Bog. With the barrier now gone, Vox Machina now head off to the rivers of the Gilded Run.
62	"Uninviting Waters"	August 6, 2016	This episode was recorded live at the Hilbert Circle Theatre in Indianapolis. Liam O'Brien is absent for this episode.
Vox Machina struggle to cross over the enchanted, dangerous rivers of the Gilded Run. They battle a large plant-like crocodile, before saying goodbye to Garmelie and heading into the Shademurk Bog. They come across a hovel inside the base of a tree. Pike and Scanlan fly over on Vex's broom to investigate. They peer through the window in the tree trunk, and while the interior looks cosy, they see a hag-like hand reach out from behind a chair. Pike and Scanlan flee, but the broom looses its magical ability. They return to the group, and while Vex makes sure her broom is still functioning, a door into the tree hovel opens.
63	"The Echo Tree"	August 11, 2016	Ashley Johnson is absent for this episode. Liam O'Brien joined via video call for this episode.
Vox Machina decide to avoid the hag, and also avoid a group of trolls as they make their way through the thick, murky sludge of the bog to the tree. After some rest and recon, the group approach the tree, and begin to hear the voice of Saundor, an archfey who has melded with the tree. Saundor speaks with Vex, tempting her to join him in companionship. However, she resists, and shoots an arrow at him. A battle then ensues, and with the help of the werewolf leader, Saundor is defeated and Vex claims her Vestige bow. The group is then approached by Artagan, who reveals that he was also Garmelie, and had enjoyed the last few days with them. He says that he will probably see them again, before Keyleth transports the group back to Whitestone.
64	"The Frigid Doom"	August 18, 2016	Ashley Johnson is absent for this episode.
Percy and Grog lose their memories of the Feywild and Scanlan returns some memory, but alters it to his own liking, upsetting Vex'ahlia particularly. The party meet with all of their friends, as well as new arrivals such as Seeker Assum. Everyone discusses the magical protections and the damage to Draconia, before they are interrupted by an alarm. Vorugal flies over, but doesn't seem to see Whitestone through the illusion, they begin to evacuate the civilians. Pike returns Grog and Percy's real memories. Everyone continues discuss the situations they are in before eventually going to bed. The group disguise themselves as tailed Dragonborns and head to Draconia where they discover Lockheed and are threatened by tailless Dragonborns. They convince them of their goals and discover Tiberius's body, having been killed by Vorugal protecting his people. After mourning and planning a funeral, they return to Whitestone and Vex bids Lockheed goodbye as he flies away.
65	"The Streets of Ank'Harel"	August 25, 2016	–
Keyleth tells Vax she is in love with him and they spend the night together. In the morning, the group argue over how to fight Vorugal, deciding to consult Kashaw. After interrupting his training session, they send him to deliver a letter. They visit Gilmore then Jarett, who requests they fetch him 'fusaka' for cooking. The group, minus Pike, teleport to the house of Gilmore's parents before walking to Ank'Harel. Vex catches Vax leaving Keyleth's room and teases him. Scanlan, convinced Fusaka is an illegal drug, starts confronting random people on the street asking if they 'do spice'. After exploring the city further, they get an audience with J'mon Sa Ord, who greets them from his throne.
66	"A Traveler's Gamble"	September 8, 2016	–
J'mon Sa Ord decides they must prove their worth, and the party fights a stone golem. After, J'mon transforms into Devossa, a brass dragon, and pledges to help them. Scanlan goes to make a spice deal for Fusaka for 400 gold, but after none of them feel any affect, Vex discovers Fusaka is an ordinary spice for food. The party go to Mistress Asharru and discover a dead body, who they believe to be shot by Anna Ripley.
67	"The Chase to Glintshore"	September 15, 2016	–
The party discover Ripley has been spying on them and is seeking Whisper, another vestige of divergence. The party continue to remove her enchantment, visit a casino and buy a boat. They fly towards where Whisper is located, and encounter a huge storm which Keyleth separates. After some hours, they reach Ripley's ship and successfully attack and sink it. They then exit the boat and head to shore.
68	"Cloak and Dagger"	September 22, 2016	–
Whilst investigating the shore, they are attacked by an air elemental. After it is killed, Vox Machina head into the jungle where they discover Ripley with two companions. When the party attempts to ambush their target, it is revealed that they were seeing illusions—part of a trap set by Ripley. She counterattacks, starting a long battle. During the fight, it is revealed that Ripley has made her own deal with Orthax. One of her companions is killed, and several members of Vox Machina are knocked unconscious. Vax discovers that Kynan is with Ripley, and attempts to convince him to switch sides. Although at first reluctant, Kynan joins Vax in attacking Orthax. Percy forgives Ripley for everything, but states he cannot allow her to leave. Orthax knocks Percy unconscious and, as he awakens, Ripley fatally shoots him. Furious and distraught at Percy's death, the party kill Ripley together—Orthax vanishing in the process. They then try, and fail, to heal their friend.
69	"Passed Through Fire"	September 29, 2016	–
They collect the Whisper Vestige and with Ripley's one surviving ally being Kynan, distressing Vax, but are unable to reach Pike for a long while. They rest in the mansion before rushing to Sarenrae's temple to meet Pike. They discover that Orthax has captured Percy's soul, and Keyleth dispels him. Pike then begins the ritual where each of them give something to help her, ending with Vex admitting she is in love with him. The ritual succeeds and a confused Percy awakens. He reunites with his sister and others. Keyleth receives a letter from Kerrek. Everyone goes out for a celebratory drink where Scanlan pays Jarett to get him an illegal drug named Suude. Vex shows the group a letter written by Percy to be read if he died, which Vax reads aloud and Vex sneaks back into Percy's pocket before he notices. The next morning, Seeker Assum gathers the party in the war room before beginning to transform into a scaly appearance, revealing he in reality the green dragon Raishan disguised as Assum. She tells them she has come as an ally to defeat Thordak.
70	"Trust"	October 6, 2016	–
Raishan explains her history and reasons for opposing Thordak. Keyleth is vehemently against Raishan for her assault on the Fire Ashari. The rest of the group decide they have to agree to her proposal and discuss it privately in the war room. Percy and Vex go to the library, Grog and Scanlan to talk to Seeker Assum, and Vax and Keyleth to the temple of the Raven Queen. After preparing further for fighting Vorugal, the party accidentally reveal Raishan to Kima then fail to wipe her memory, angering her. They then all teleport to Draconia.
71	"Vorugal"	October 13, 2016	–
Everyone wakes up and begin to plan for the battle. They meet the Ravenites in their hideout and Keyleth returns to Whitestone to collect Pike. They are met by 'Larkin' a dwarven mercenary really Raishan in disguise, Vox Machina attempt to keep this a secret in front of Kima. They scry on Vorugal and take shelter in the mansion. Vax wonders where Raishan is, and everyone stares at him in disbelief. The team plan to attack and stalk Vorugal, and a battle erupts. Vex'ahlia eventually kills Vorugal will help from Raishan. Everyone heals and rests, with Raishan returning to Assum and vanishing.
72	"The Elephant in the Room"	October 20, 2016	–
The party loots the deceased before exploring the lair and creating a tomb for Tiberius. They return to the mansion and test out their weapons on each other. Vax advises Vex to speak to Percy. Keyleth transforms herself into an elephant, accidentally causing Grog to think an elephant ate her and start a fight between the confused Vox Machina. After returning to Vorugal's lair, Vex speaks to Percy and they kiss.
73	"The Coming Storm"	October 27, 2016	–
Vox Machina return to Whitestone and visit Raishan and Gilmore. Kashaw is furious at the group as they killed the dragon despite sending him to deliver letters. Jarett advises Scanlan to stop trying to find Suude, eventually punching him. At a war meeting, Percy unexpectedly stabs 'Assum' three times, only for her to be an illusion. Vox Machina is angry with him, but explain the situation to Allura and the others, continuing the meeting. The meeting dissolves into an argument as Keyleth refuses to cooperate with Raishan. Eventually, they decide their plan of attack on Thordak and plan to head to Fort Daxio.
74	"Path of Brass"	November 3, 2016	–
In Fort Daxio, Vox Machina discover that the forces needed are still in Syngorn, but reveal their own plan. Scanlan feeds the troops in his mansion whilst the party plan and fix their weapons. They decide to collect another vestige in the fire plane, a set of armor for Pike, and manage to trick their way inside the city. They befriend Senokir and Uten who disguise the party, minus Vax and Keyleth, as slaves.
75	"Where the Cards Fall"	November 10, 2016	–
Senokir explains the history of the Fire Plane and recent coup. Terrified, Keyleth blurts out her full name and title to Whaska, a fire giant, who agrees to help them after handing over most of their weapons and gold. They visit Juuraiel who has the vestige in her personal museum, Scanlan challenges her to a card game with comically large cards, he then wagers himself as a slave but still loses. Juuraiel decides to give them rings to ward off onlookers and allow them to roam about. The party and Senokir explore the market, where Vex buys two young boys being sold as slaves. Vox Machina confront Ghurrix, who calls upon an erinyes to help him.
76	"Brawl in the Arches"	November 17, 2016	–
Vox Machina fight Ghurrix and the Erinyes ending with Scanlan killing him with Mythcarver. Scanlan modifies memories of the newly arrived efreeti, leading them to believe Ghurrix was trying to assassinate the Sultan. In the mansion, the party rest and Vex befriends the two boys she saved. At Juuraiel's they trade the necklace for the armor vestige. Senokir reveals his favor is for them to bury a box containing the ashes for his late wife Zaafin. They agree to bury it in Vasselheim and teleport back to Fort Daxio with the two young boys. As they arrive, they discover Fort Daxio is in the middle of collapsing.
77	"Clash at Daxio"	December 1, 2016	TBA
The party survey the area and kill wyvern riders outside the Fort. After a fight, Xanthas arrives and begins mind-controlling and fighting the party. Kima manages to kill him. The party loot the many deceased and then travel back to Whitestone. After a meeting, they resolve to begin the assault on Emon.
78	"The Siege of Emon"	December 8, 2016	Guest stars Will Friedle and Mary Elizabeth McGlynn.
Vox Machina gather forces around Whitestone including Zahra and a reluctant Kashaw. A disgusted Jarett gives Scanlan some Suude. Everyone meets to discuss the plan, and Kashaw points out all of the problems and suggests a better one. That night, Percy visits Vex in her room. Vox Machina, Kashaw and Zahra head to Emon and the Greyskull Keep, passing many forces along the way. They sneak into the sewer systems and encounter two fire giants which attack them. Kashaw and Zahra are forced to stay behind as Vox Machina arrive in Thordak's lair, coming face to face with him.
79	"Thordak"	December 15, 2016	–
Thordak emerges, not spotting the party, and they, aided my Raishan, attack. During the battle, most of the party are injured, Gilmore seriously. Eventually, Thordak attempts to escape but Vax chases, remembering his mother's voice and finally killing him. Vex, arriving soon after, comforts him. After finishing off his remaining bodies, Raishan joins the twins and begins casting Speak with dead prompting Vax to attack her. Vax, Vex and Keyleth chase her, but she fires fireballs injuring the latter two.

=== 2017 ===
List of episodes in 2017
Episode	Title	Original release date	Notes
80	"Raishan"	January 5, 2017	–
The rest of the party attempt to reach the trio, whilst Raishan's magic overpowers everyone. She injures, knocks unconscious and kills several of the party although all are revived. Whilst the party are distracted healing Vax and reviving Scanlan, she disappears through a magical barrier, taking Thordak's body with her.
81	"What Lies Beneath the Surface"	January 12, 2017	Guest stars Patrick Rothfuss.
The party confirm that Zahra and Kashaw survived and reunite with Kerrek. Scanlan uses J'mon Sa Ord's sacred pipe to smoke Suude, then lies convincingly about the drug being medicinal. The party argue over responsibility and search for weapons to fight Raishan. Keyleth scrys on Raishan and Kerrek identifies the volcanic island, everyone agrees to head there the next morning. Scanlan enchants Jarret into believing he has to give him more Suude. Whilst everyone is bathing, Vax visits Percy and they have an awkward conversation where Vax admits he views Percy as a brother, when he leaves Vex'ahlia comes up gasping for breath. After a meeting with Allura, everyone goes to bed and Vax visits Keyleth and cuts the burnt ends of her hair, giving her short hair while saying some words of encouragements.
82	"Deadly Echoes"	January 19, 2017	Guest stars Patrick Rothfuss. Sam Riegel is absent.
Everyone prepares for the battle and manage to track Raishan to a cave. They explore her seemingly empty lair, finding many spells, potions, books and ingredients before being attacked by four flaming skulls. After killing them, they head down a flight of stairs where they encounter traps, and then a huge chasm which inverts gravity and is filled with the zombified bodies of the previous victims. Vax sneaks ahead and finds Raishan reading a spellbook in a human form.
83	"The Deceiver's Stand"	January 26, 2017	Guest stars Patrick Rothfuss.
Raishan warns them to leave and the party eventually realize she is an illusion. The real Raishan unleashes a devastating attack, knocking out Allura, Kerrek and Trinket immediately. She is then aided by her wraiths as the battle begins, easily injuring and knocking almost all of the party unconscious. She kills Scanlan before Keyleth casts Feeblemind, removing all of her intelligence. In her stupor she kills Percy, but Kerrek manages to kill her. The party discover the dead Scanlan and Percy, they first manage to revive Percy but fail to revive Scanlan, infuriating Grog. The party loot her lair before accidentally destroying it. Allura and Kima attempt to teleport back to the Greyskull Keep, but something goes wrong and Keyleth miraculously finds them drowning at sea, saving their lives. After some false starts, the party teleport back to Whitestone and they decide to start their second revival attempt. Whilst the rest of the party consults the Raven Queen, Vex teleports with Eskil Ryndarien to Kymal and tracks down Kaylie.
84	"Loose Ends"	February 2, 2017	Guest stars Patrick Rothfuss. Ashley Johnson returns for this episode. Sam Riegel is absent.
Kaylie arrives at the Raven Queen's temple, and is distraught that Scanlan broke his promise to stay alive. After some preparation, she returns extremely drunk. During the ritual, Kaylie plays the violin, Grog sings a song and Pike recites a poem. It works, although it leaves him comatose. They send a message to Vex reassuring her and tell everyone in Whitestone he is alive. Grog, Pike and Kerrek get drunk, Pike and Percy decide to prank Scanlan - smearing him with pudding, dressing him in a nightgown and tying him down with scarves. Vex celebrates with Trinket in Kymal. Kerrek is approached by his associate Vanessa and says his goodbyes. The party, still suspicious of Senokir, debate whether to bury his box but eventually do, holding a burial for his wife in Vasselheim. Grog visits Earthbreaker Groon who reveals he has been having visions of Grog and takes a fighting stance.
85	"A Bard's Lament"	February 9, 2017	–
Groon and Grog fight, ending with Grog knocking him out of the ring. They decide to head back to wake up Scanlan, but he becomes furious at them for dressing him up and showing Kaylie his body. The argument eventually culminates into Scanlan revealing he believes none of them care for him, demanding 'What's my mother's name?' which nobody knows, nor do they know he had to watch her be murdered by goblins. Percy loses his temper and yells at him about Kaylie, only to discover she was listening at the door. Scanlan leaves the party with Kaylie, leaving them distraught and in disarray. The next morning the party decide to visit Marquet, where they meet the rich Taryon Darrington, who they immediately dislike, and his golem Doty. Tary reveals he is writing an adventuring book and is willing to pay them for 50,000 gold to allow him to join them. The party unwillingly agree and they travel to Debt's Reprise.
86	"Daring Days"	February 16, 2017	–
In the Debt's Respite the party hands Treev the hand of Ripley, proving they did not murder Mistress Asharru. After this, they get to know their new companion, Tary, learning about his list of adventures he would like to accomplish. They make a quick visit to J'mon's tower, speaking to the Grand Maven, to let them know that the last dragon of the conclave has been slayed, and Vex puts in a good word for Jarett. After returning to Whitestone (with Tary), Vex updates Jarett on the recent events and Jarett hands her the suude he had procured for Scanlan. Vox Machina then starts a hazing of their new companion, nearly knocking him out, before he finally admits he is not quite as heroic as he had been saying he is. Now that the facade has gone down, the party actually starts to like the new guy. They travel to the Earth Ashari in Terra to acquire knowledge on how to get to the Water Ashari, after which they teleport to Emon and charter a ride with captain Adella on the Drensala Vis.
87	"Onward to Vesrah"	February 23, 2017	–
After a few uneventful days of sailing, the Drensala Vis gets caught in an unnatural fogcloud. From the fog cloud appears a pirate ship, and a battle ensues. Vox Machina comes out victorious and they save a captive who was locked in a cage in the pirate ship. Tary and Percy tinker together, and Percy tells Vex he heard what she said to him when he was dead. Once they arrive at the Water Ashari, headmaster Uvenda explains the party will have to cross to the water elemental plane, recover three lodestones, and be careful to not kill the kraken, as it is responsible for creating the lodestones, which keep the city of Vesrah afloat. Keyleth also finds out that her mother did reach the Water Ashari when she was on her Aramenté, but that her companions died during the challenge, and only her mother's leg was ever found.
88	"Tangled Depths"	March 2, 2017	–
After an evening of prepping, the group of adventurers make their way to the water plane to retrieve the lodestones. The first one is retrieved rather easily, but when Tary finds a decomposing human skull while digging for the second stone he freaks out and attracts the attention of the kraken. The party starts fighting the kraken, but struggle to do so. They do manage to dig up the other two lodestones while battling. Several people get swallowed, and Vax dies. With Keyleth plane shifting the twins and herself to Vesrah, everybody eventually makes it to the other side of the portal, but not before Grog gets swallowed a third time and destroys all but one kraken tentacle.
89	"Curious Tides"	March 9, 2017	Ashley Johnson returns for this episode.
Once the groups regathers at the center of the city, Pike is called through some druid magic and makes her way to Vesrah in her astral form to perform a resurrection ritual. After Vex makes an offer to the Raven Queen to fight Orcus for her, and Keyleth and Grog speak to Vax as well, the ritual succeeds and Vax is brought back to life, right after the Raven Queen makes a brief appearance to the whole group. Now that Keyleth has finished her Aramenté, headmaster Uvenda learns Keyleth shapechange, so she can change into monsters. Pike meets Taryon and gets Doty, Tary's automaton, to draw hyperrealistic drawings of the group members in their sleep to use as flash cards so Tary can learn everybody's names. The band goes back to Emon and researches the papers found in Opash/Thordak/Raishan's lair.
90	"Voice of the Tempest"	March 16, 2017	–
Vox Machina decides they want to go to Vasselheim to safely store Opash's journal, but realize they need to disguise the automaton Doty as he is an arcane entity. The twins go to the Platinum sanctuary to talk with Scalebearer Vord to discuss potentially leaving Orcus' journal there and to get information on Orcus and on the Nine Hells. Keyleth and Percival go to the Cobalt library and read up on the Nine Hells, and Taryon and Grog go to buy potions from a merchant who never want to meet them ever again. Vax and Percy decide to bring the journal of Opash to the temple of the Raven Queen, where a priest promises to properly dispose of it. Vex and Keyleth but some nice dresses, which they wear the next day when they teleport to Zephrah, the city of the Air Ashari and Keyleth's home. As Keyleth has now completed her Aramenté, a ceremony is held for her and she become the Voice of the Tempest.
91	"Vox Machina Go to Hell"	March 23, 2017	–
After the ceremony, Vox Machina gets ready to go to hell. After learning the very basics of Infernal from a tiefling gardener, they plane shift to the city of Dis on the second layer of Hell. It is difficult to navigate in the city, but eventually they find a tavern and are given some 'food'. When Keyleth takes a bite, they find out this 'food' is actually slivers of soul stones. After a successful scry the party finds out Hotis is still in egg-form somewhere under the ground in a prison. Percy and Grog talk with the devil Ipkesh, the manager of the tavern, and consider doing a contract with him where they kill his superior for him and he safely gets them to prison to kill Hotis. When Keyleth goes outside to do a fly over to investigate the city, she is followed by two humanoids who say they want Vax, who had previously been disguised as an albino tiefling.
92	"Deals in the Dark"	March 30, 2017	Guest stars ND Stevenson.
Keyleth gets out of the alley unharmed by changing into an erinyes, and the party uses Keyleth in this form to try and get some information out of a clerk devil, without too much success. They decide to take the contract that Ipkesh gave them, with a few adaptation, and Percy signs. The next morning the party heads out together with Vasa, an imp guide given to them, towards the place where the pit fiend they are to kill in order to fulfill the contract is. Through a door that Tary makes they enter into a torture room where they find a dwarven female named Tova, who turns out to be a were-bear, who they free right before her torturer, a devil, appears. They kill the devil, together with a few other evil creatures that respond to the noise, before they make their way towards the central chamber where Utugash, the pit fiend, is waiting for them.
93	"Bats out of Hell"	April 6, 2017	Guest stars ND Stevenson.
A large battle ensues, but the party manages to kill the pit fiend and its lessers, unfortunately losing Doty in the process. A few moments later a group of devils and others come in to arrest them, and the party surrenders. They are taken to the Mentiri prison, where they are shackled up in a cell, but as per the contract they are left alone, their weapons and belongings are left unharmed, be it right outside of the prison cell, and they are given directions as to where they can find Hotis. They get out of the cell, and start making their way to Hotis as bats, but get caught in a fight with some guards before they reach him. While Hotis' room is guarded by a chain golem, the party is able to quickly open the door and Grog smashes the rakshasa fetus to bits. The party forms a human string to get ready for a plane shift, leaving Tova behind with the ring of invisibility so she can attempt to free her friends from the prison.
94	"Jugs and Rods"	April 13, 2017	–
The party returns to Whitestone and reunite with Pike once again. In the Tipsy Quorum tavern; Grog and Tary have a lighthearted competition to win over the heart of the barmaid, Grog without too much success. Tary is not great at it either, but the barmaid does help him find a lady to go to home with for the night, Trish - who beat Grog at arm wrestling last winter's crest. Grog and Pike wait for him at the bar, and the next morning Tary tells them he is now certain: women are not for him. At breakfast Vex is told that as Grand Mistress of the Grey Hunt, she is to undertake a ceremony which involves her hunting a quarry in the Parchwood. She sits down near the sun tree and starts meditating on what to hunt and where. After many hours, she finally gets a vision and runs into the night on Trinket, following tracks until she finds the beast. With the help of Trinket, Vex'ahilia is able to kill the grey render and at dawn returns to Whitestone castle with one of its hands, now officially Grand Mistress of the Grey Hunt.
95	"One Year Later..."	April 27, 2017	–
After a year of individual pursuits, the party regroups and heads out to Marquet to the Bay of Gifts for a beach vacation. When Grog is burying Tary into the sand, Vax sees the opportunity to grab Tary's armor and hide it in Percy and Vex's room. When Tary finds his armor in their room, he releases two mastiffs who sunder the room. Vex is furious when she returns, and when she finds out Vax was in their room and he denies she sends Trinket after him, who pins Vax to the ground until he admits he put Taryon's armor in their room. Eventually Keyleth and Doty help clean the room and everyone enjoys the rest of their vacation. Once back in Whitestone, Pike's cousin Johann shows up unexpected, together with his wife Astra, sister JB and father Ogden. Over dinner uncle Ogden tells Pike he has been having dreams of Pike dying a terrible death, and that is why they have come to see her and try to protect her.
96	"Family Matters"	May 4, 2017	–
Grog, Vax and Percy take the Trickfoots on a tour through Whitestone. The rest of the party meanwhile teleport to Westruun to talk to Pike's grandpa, Wilhand, about the family curse. Later, Pike goes on a walk with Ogden and he tells her the history of their cursed bloodline. He explains he may be able to perform an exorcism on Pike at the next full moon to remove the curse. Although the party is hesitant, they gather the materials needed for the ritual before making their way to a mountain bluff where the exorcism can take place. The ritual is started, during which a shade with many screaming faces appears around Pike. The party starts fighting it, but they realize that the shade is an illusion created by Ogden. They capture the gnomes, who admit they it was a con to get money. Pike decides to give Ogden, Astra and Johann her money purse and tells them she never wants to see them again or she will kill them, while JB stays behind with the party.
97	"Taryon, My Wayward Son"	May 11, 2017	–
Once the Trickfoots leave, Vex looks for the lost diamond. Spotting it from her broom, she asks Keyleth to get it. Keyleth dives off the 1000 feet cliff – impacting the rocks below and dying instantly. Vex brings Keyleth back. Returning to Whitestone, the party find a woman looking for a job waiting at their bakery. They agree to meet her the next day. Arriving at the castle, JB is given the job of searching the library for information on the orb of death. Vex and Percy go to look at the ziggurat. Shooting an oracle arrow into the orb, Vex sees that it is a siphon that channels towards a dark obsidian tower. The following morning, Allura begins researching this new information. The group realizes Tary is missing, so scry on him finding out that he’s been kidnapped and taken home to Deastok, a city in Wildemount. Through teleporting to Draconia and then wind walking; they catch-up with and free Tary before he is brought to his father, but go to the estate anyway. They find out Tray's family is in financial trouble, and that Tary is to marry a lady so the family debts can be paid.
98	"The Mines of the Many"	May 18, 2017	–
After Tary talks to his sister and his mother, the group makes their way to the Grumpy Lily to find Korshad, the man of the Myriad to whom Tary's father is in debt. They make a deal: Vox Machina slays a beast that resides in the Platinum Mines of Herethis, and the Darringtons get to keep their estate and their name, but lose the rest of their property. The party makes their way to the mine, getting some info on what to expect inside it from a corpse nearby before they make their way in. Once down, they fight a little celestial baby cherub, gather the glitter that is its remains, and get back out on the magic carpet and flying brooms before the ankhegs that have now gathered around the whole exit get too many attacks on them.
99	"Masquerade"	June 1, 2017	Guest stars Jon Heder.
The party defeat the ankhegs and return to Korshad, who gives Tary the deeds to the estate and an adjoining piece of farmland. Over breakfast the next morning, Tary tells his family of what has happened and how he would like to move back home. Although emotions are high, the family agrees. He goes back to Whitestone with the party, so that he can collect his belongings. On arrival the party stop at a farmers market and are approached by Lionel 'Chod' Gayheart, a messenger for Aes Adan who is offering information about a mysterious pyramid in exchange for Percy's gun designs. During the meeting Vex sees through Scanlan's illusion and, when negotiations come to an end, she follows him out. Scanlan tries to modify Vex's memory but fails - making enough noise to attract the attention of the rest of the party. During a tense conversation, Scanlan talks about his past year, and the second ziggurat in Marquet. Several of the party members do not want to talk to Scanlan. He unsuccessfully attempts to talk to Grog, but does talk to Pike. The next morning, they gather at the Sun Tree to go to Marquet.
100	"Unfinished Business"	June 8, 2017	Guest stars Jon Heder.
The party teleports to Ank'harel, meet briefly with Kaylie, before wind walking to the Smouldercrown Mountains. They make their way in, fight a few undead, and retreat to Scanlan's mansion for the night. Vax has a conversation with Scanlan, whilst Vex pulls Pike aside. Pike then goes to talk with Grog. The pair decide they will show Scanlan what he has missed by showing their best sides the next day. In the morning; the two of them leave the mansion by themselves and start killing a horde of undead, with some help from Lionel. Scanlan apologizes to Pike and Grog in front of the group. The party sees two cultists, who the twins assassinate – taking the box being transported. They make their way down he halls, ending in a room with a ziggurat upon which is siphon with Delilah Briarwood next to it. In the ensuing battle Delilah feebleminds Pike before she disappears through the orb. Doty dies. With Sarenrae's help, Pike sees through the orb the same place Vex saw in Whitestone's siphon. Once out of the orb’s antimagic range, Keyleth undoes feeblemind, and the group talks to the corpse of one the followers of the Whispered One.
101	"Thar Amphala"	June 15, 2017	–
Vox Machina decides to collapse the paths leading to the ziggurat in Marquet before heading back to Whitestone to prepare for their visit to the Shadowfell. The next day Tary lets Vex know he will not be joining them, as he has to repair Doty before heading back to Wildemount with Lionel to start his own Darrington brigade of adventurers. The party heads down to the ziggurat and with the cultist necklaces around their necks jump through the spinning orb of death. They land on a platform on the outskirts of a city within the Shadowfell, seeing the black obsidian tower in the distance, as well as two other siphons. They start making their way through this undead city, which they discover through interrogating a cultist is the city of Thar Amphala, the city once built for the Whispered one. They begin to make their way to the Entropis, the tower where the Undying King is supposed to be resurrected soon.
102	"Race to the Tower"	June 22, 2017	–
The party continues their journey towards the tower, hopping from building to building to avoid the hordes of undead and flying gloom stalkers. In the city center, they find crystals like the ones in Syngorn, which could plane shift the city. Keyleth makes a hole in the city wall for the party to crawl through, but gets caught by a gloom stalker before she makes it through. Scanlan dominates the monster and together with Vax they use it to fly to the tower. There they see the orb on top of the tower explode, killing a bunch of people on the top of the tower and severing the ties with the other orbs. The group reunite and disguise themselves as cultists before making their way towards the tower. Keyleth and Pike partially collapse the tower. The fingered zenith slowly descends into the rubble. The group make their way up the zenith, to find Delilah, a death knight and the reborn Vecna. Most of the party are immediately paralyzed, and Vecna kills Vex'ahlia and disintegrates Vax'ildan. The party kills Delilah, and Pike revivifies Vex. Vox Machina realizes they cannot win this fight, gather Vax's belongings, and plane shift to the Feywild.
103	"The Fate-Touched"	June 29, 2017	–
Arriving in the Shademirk Forest, Scanlan tears out the reptile eye out of Delilah's corpse, then impulsively tries to tear his own eye out before Pike stops him. Realizing they do not have the power to get Vax back that day, they get some rest. Floating between death and life, Vax'ildan has an encounter with the Raven Queen during which he pledges he will return to her forever if she gives him another change to save Exandria, his chosen family, and his love from Vecna. The next morning, he walks towards the group, who are surprised and careful to inspect that it really is him. The party realizes they will need some more help to fight Vecna and make their way to Sarenrae's temple in Vasselheim. Here Pike receives an attuning fork needed to plane shift to the plane of Elysium where Sarenrae resides. Meanwhile, Grog and Scanlan, on their way to meet the Lord of the Quadroads, get arrested by the guards and they have to flee. Once reunited, the party head to the Island of Renewal, but not before briefly visit the Fire Ashari to let all the cities with crisis orbs know what’s going on.
104	"Elysium"	July 6, 2017	–
Once landed on the pearl beach of the Island of Renewal, the party figures out how to reach Sarenrae's crystal temple through Pike's faith. They explain to Sarenrae what has happened with Vecna, and she blesses Pike before sending them to Pelor, as he will know more about the ritual of seeding, which is what Vecna is seemingly in the process of doing in order to become a god. After walking through an orchard for a few hours, they reach the Fortress of the Sun, where they meet with the Dawnfather. They explain their purpose for coming here and ask for his blessing. None of them follow Pelor, so Vex'ahlia steps forward and together they undergo a trial for her to receive the blessing. They succeed, and Vex'ahlia in granted the blessing, and given a piece of Pelor which should help them seal Vecna away. Pelor gives them a vision of where to go to find the goddess Ioun, the Wounded Mistress, who should know more about how to banish Vecna.
105	"The Fear of Isolation"	July 13, 2017	Guest stars Darin De Paul.
The party travel to Terrah, which is close to the place where they can find the key to Ioun. The next morning, they make their way to a small house in the forests, where they meet Sprigg, a frazzled elderly gnome. While talking to the man, they hear Vecna's voice thanking them for 'letting me know where he is', and a battle with a bunch of undead ensues. They win, and when Sprigg prays to Ioun he begins to glow blue. Using Sprigg as the tuning fork, Keyleth plane shifts the party to an endless library beyond the divine gate. Scanlan hints at the fact that Percy told Pelor he is betrothed to Vex, and the two of them admit they secretly got married. They meet Ioun.
106	"The Endless Atheneeum"	July 27, 2017	Guest stars Darin De Paul.
Ioun chooses Scanlan as the one who is to complete a challenge receive her blessing. He must find the tome that holds the Incantation of Isolation within one hour. The party succeeds and get the book and the blessing. Ioun also tells them how to make the trammels that will make it easier to banish Vecna and talks about Vecna's past. While talking, she senses Vecna's ritual has succeeded, and he is now a god. Ioun gives them a piece of her to make a trammel. When the party returns to Sprigg's house, leaving Sprigg with Ioun, Vecna's illusion appears to the group, and they have a conversation. They teleport to Vasselheim and Vax goes down the blood pool to talk to the Raven Queen. He gets another piece of god. Grog tries to reach Kord, but without success. The party tries to speak with Delilah’s corpse, but Pike cannot reach her, so Keyleth scries on her instead. They find out she’s in Thar Amphala, alive.
107	"Scaldseat"	August 3, 2017	–
After having a heroes feast, the party, without Pike, sets out for Issylra, where they rent a crappy boat to sail to the underwater volcano Scaldseat where the Core Anvil is. They make their way into the volcano, using waterbreathing to not suffocate in the water nor the toxic air. They get into a fight with a magma bulette and her two young, which they kill. The party then heads towards the Allhammer's workplace, getting to a hexagonal chamber with a large inward triangular object, and three relief men with triangular voids as faces. When Percy touches one of them, the reliefs jump out of the wall, ready to fight.
108	"The Core Anvil"	August 10, 2017	–
The party fights the metal constructs, and Grog uses his blacksmithing skills to cast platinum into the pyramidal void faces. They shove the platinum triangles in the large gold object, but nothing happens. They redo it with gold, and this opens the door. The party then enters the room with the Core Anvil, which is protected by a giant stone entity. When talking does not seem to work, they fight instead. It is a tough fight, as the entities' sword blinds people when it hits them, but eventually it lays down its sword and becomes inert in the back of the room. Grog starts working on the trammels, together with Percy, and manages to infuse them with the gods' pieces. Percy then chisels the runes onto them, completing three Prime Trammels.
109	"The Ominous March"	August 17, 2017	This episode was recorded live at the Old National Centre in Indianapolis.
Vax had promised Grog a present if he made the trammels, so when they party goes into Scanlan's mansion to rest, he pulls him aside. He tells Grog that Taryon had given him a love potion, and Vax wants to prank Scanlan with it. While debriefing with some wine, Vax puts the potion in Scanlan's drink, and he falls intensely in love with Percy. He confesses his love furiously and even tries to cuddle up in bed with Percy, and Vex, before the potion wears off. The party makes their way to Vasselheim, where a large group of important leaders has gathered. Vecna's illusion appears and threatens them, but Allura is able to dispel it, while Vex attunes to a ring that prevents scrying. The party and J'mon sa Ord transport to the foot of the Zenwick mountains and scry on the death knight. They realize Vecna is in front of them, so jump on J'mon's dragon back and start making their way to him. They find out he has put the inner part of Thar Amphala on top of an undead earth titan, which is making its way to Vasselheim. The party flies to him and enters its hip.
110	"The Climb Within"	August 24, 2017	–
As Vox Machina makes their way into the titan, the walls start moving and they have to fight earth elemental like entities. They win and make their way to a sarcophagus of a dwarven king. While a few party members are briefly petrified, they manage to rob the king of his hammer and belt. Slowly ascending inside the titan, Vax kills a one-eyed entity before the groups has to fight a bunch of undead trolls. Grog uses the hammer he just found, but realizes it is cursed, as he is sometimes forced to hit himself with it. Once the trolls are dead, Pike releases the curse from Grog.
111	"Shadows of Thomara"	September 14, 2017	–
Going deeper into the titan, the party finds an iron room with a brazier, some buttons, and a mirror. The party, with the clever use of Vax's snake Simon and Scanlan's unseen servant, manage to figure out how to turn the mirror into a portal without being roasted alive. They then reach the main city part of Thomara, where Scanlan's servant grabs a blue crystal from the temple around which undead are clustered. Making their way through a former viaduct, the party encounters Remnants, followers of Vecna. They have a tough fight, as the cultists have a sphere of annihilation that nearly takes Grog and they hide behind a force wall, but the party manages to kill everyone without them alerting others. Scanlan manages to get control over the sphere of annihilation. Pike attempts to speak to the corpse of a cultist, but only hears laughter and suffers psychic damage. They dispose of the bodies in the sphere of annihilation.
112	"Dark Dealings"	September 21, 2017	–
The party makes their way towards a chamber in which the bottom of Thar Amphala is planted. There are several entities blocking the way, and they kill a few before caving in the tunnels behind them and making their way into Thar Amphala. Vex'ahlia locates the sword of Kas, which has slain Vecna once before, and while some of the party hides in Scanlan's mansion, the half-elves stealth towards the sword. Vex becomes ethereal, which causes Vecna to finally have vision on Vax and Keyleth, as the anti-scrying ring no longer works. While Vex has to wait for the ethereal oil to wear off, Keyleth, as an earth elemental, manages to find the sword. Vex releases Trinket to let Keyleth know where she is, and they wait for Vex to return to her normal form before going back to the mansion. Suddenly they are bamfed out of their mansion by Delilah and Sylas, but Keyleth teleports them to the Feywild. Grog finds out Kas's sword talks. They make a deal with their archfey friend Artagan that he will control the time when they teleport back, while he gets to strangle Vax to death. Vax returns a few hours later.
113	"The Final Ascent"	September 28, 2017	Guest stars Joe Manganiello.
In preparation for the final fight, Scanlan creates another Scanlan. After resting in the Feywild, the party teleports back to Thar Amphala, where they help a dragonborn tame a gloomstalker. They find out it is Arkhan, a paladin of Tiamat who Percy and Keyleth have met before. They destroy one of the creststone crystals in the walls, causing the protective shield around the city to partly dissipate. This alerts the Briarwoods, who fly in on their skeletal dragon and start fighting the group. They kill Delilah, and with that the dragon, while Sylas is beaten into his misty vampire form but manages to escape. De'vossa and the wyverns swarm into the city and start attacking the gloomstalkers. The party makes their way to the tower Entropis and starts ascending it, preparing themselves for the final battle. They get to a chamber where they see three death knights, and the twins kill two of them. They then take a closer look, and realize they killed Kaylie and Cassandra, leaving Gilmore alive. Pike revivifies the girls, and Gilmore casts haste on Grog before teleporting himself and the girls to safety.
114	"Vecna, the Ascended"	October 5, 2017	Guest stars Will Friedle, Mary Elizabeth McGlynn, and Joe Manganiello.
Vox Machina runs to the top of the tower, where they find Vecna, now in his full avatar god form, with Velora Vessar unconscious in his chest. Vecna cracks the tower in pieces with a meteor storm, and teleports Grog to a different plane. Vex catches the limp body of her little sister when she falls dead, while Grog eventually returns to the battle. The party holds up quite well, especially when Pike heals everyone back to full health halfway through. Zahra and Kashaw join in for a bit, but Vecna plummets them down the tower. Arkhan then joins the fight, right before Grog hits Vecna with Pelor's trammel. Keyleth tries to attach the Raven Queen's trammel with her planetar strength but fails. Grog however attaches Ioun's trammel, and the party tries to hold Vecna down until he can be banished. He resists when Scanlan reads the book, but Keyleth in her planetar form is able to banish Vecna, saving Vasselheim and the rest of Exandria. Arkhan however steals Vecna's hand and vanishes.
115	"The Chapter Closes"	October 12, 2017	Guest stars Will Friedle and Mary Elizabeth McGlynn. The events from the one-shots The Search for Grog and The Search for Bob take place during this episode.
With Vecna dead, the tower begins falling, but the party manages to get down safely, with Velora's body, and find Kashaw and Zahra just barely alive. Kash is able to bring Velora back to live before he and the pregnant Zahra say their goodbyes and head back into Vasselheim. They scry on Sylas Briarwood and see he is fleeing. J'mon gives the party a ride to Bahamut's temple, where they meet with Highbearer Vord and Allura. The Raven Queen comes down, and while the group tries to convince her otherwise, after saying their last goodbyes, she takes her champion Vax'ildan with her to the afterlife. Grog brings the Sword of Kas and Arkhan's hand to Highbearer Vord, and the party checks up in Sarenrae's temple before drinking their grief away, the little Velora with some apple juice on Vex’s lap. They make their way back to Whitestone, where Grog pulls a magic card and his soul is banished to Pandemonium, where the party has to find him. From here on, Vox Machina follows their own journeys, some alone, gnomes together, but never too far away. A large raven comes to visit Keyleth every day, as the story comes to an end.

=== Specials ===
List of specials
No.	Title	Original release date	Notes
1	"The Search for Grog"	February 22, 2019	
Set during the final episode of the series, Vox Machina head to Pandemonium to recover Grog's soul after his use of the Deck of Many Things. This episode was recorded live on January 19, 2019 at The Theatre at the Ace Hotel and premiered on Twitch on February 22, 2019 before being released via YouTube and Twitch VOD the following day.
2	"The Search for Bob"	June 23, 2019	
After reuniting Grog's soul with his body, Vox Machina must now find Bob to recover the items he took; the team needs these items to be able to leave Pandemonium.
3	"Dalen's Closet"	August 29, 2019	
One year following the defeat of Vecna; Percy and Vex invite the surviving members of Vox Machina to Dalen's Closet for an official wedding ceremony—having previously married in secret. Keyleth, her bodyguard Derrig, Taryon, Doty 5.0, Scanlan, Pike, and Grog connect. Preparations continue and more guests arrive. After Keyleth and Tary make their "best person" and "man of honor" speeches, everyone – except for Grog, Derrig and Trinket – falls unconscious from spiked wine. Percy and Vex are abducted by humanoid shadows. Keyleth, Pike, Scanlan, Allura and Kima are woken, and they follow footsteps to a cliff. Captives of Sylas Briarwood; Percy and Vex awake only to be thrown off a cliff. Vex drowns, but Percy manages to swim to shore and alert the others. Pike revives Vex and the party attack Sylas and his cohorts, with Vex killing him. Returning to finish the wedding ceremony; Scanlan uses his final Wish to allow Vax to return from the dead for some final words. The Raven Queen and Vax arrive, and after all of the party exchange final words, he vanishes crying "Thank you! Live!" Pike pronounces them husband and wife, the celebration begins as Grog tackles Scanlan for the bouquet.

== Reception ==
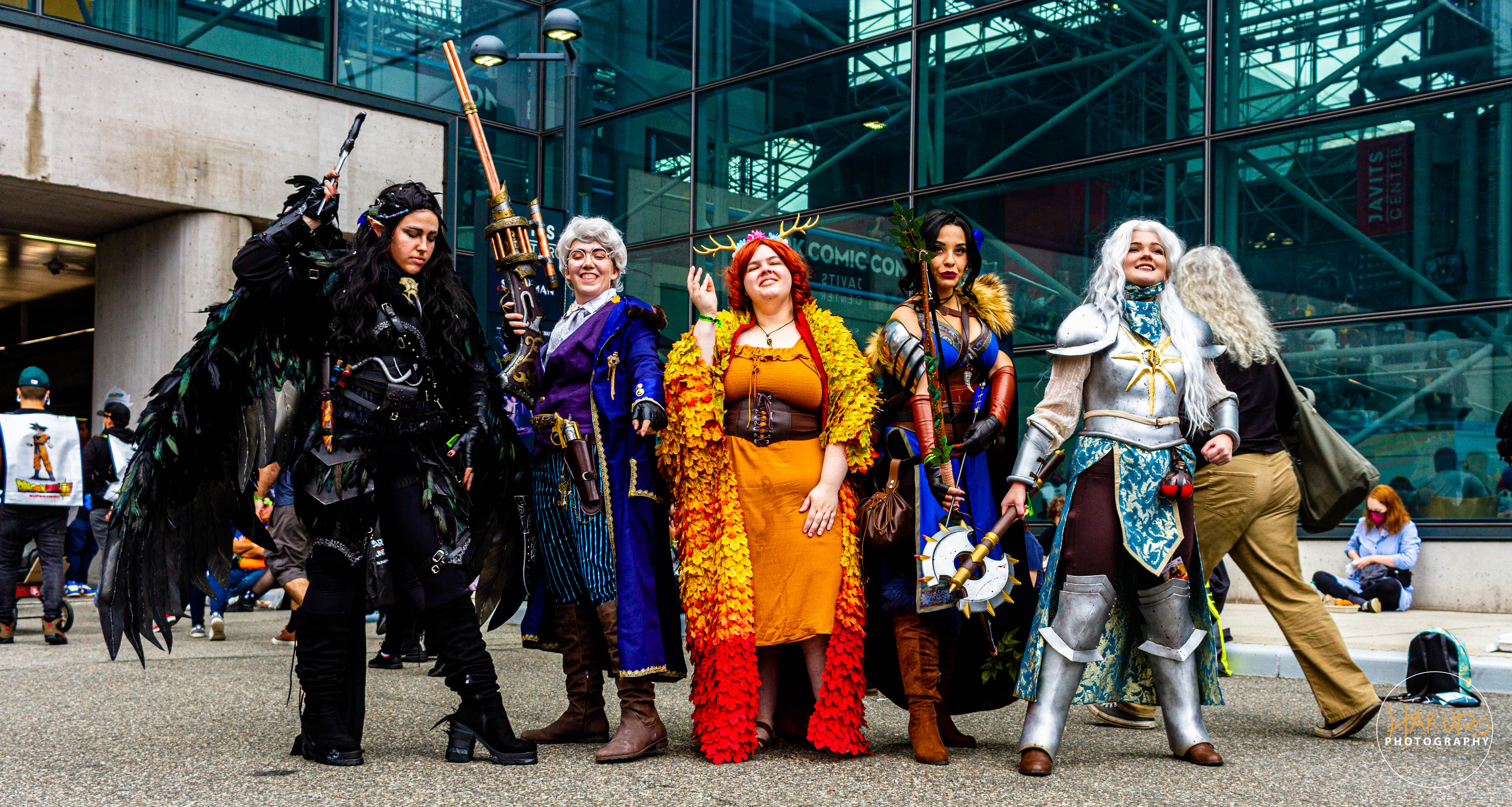
A group cosplaying as the main cast at New York Comic Con 2021

In 2016, the show was nominated in the Streamy Awards for the "Gaming" category.

Critical Role has been credited by VentureBeat as responsible for making actual play shows "their own genre of entertainment", and has since become one of the most prominent actual play series. By January 2021, the first episode of Campaign One had been watched 15 million times on YouTube. Both the show's length and high viewership have been emphasized by multiple critics. Ben Kuchera, for Polygon in 2016, wrote:

According to Geek and Sundry the show has reached over 37 million minutes watched, with over one million minutes watched per episode on Twitch. The show's YouTube account has over 1.3 million subscribers, with over 10,000 paying subscribers on Twitch. What's even more surprising is that following the story requires a substantial commitment on the part of the viewer. Episodes of Critical Role often last multiple hours, or may even be split into multiple parts.

Chris DeVille, for The Verge in 2017, stated Critical Role is "arguably the most popular and influential D&D liveplay series" and that "the YouTube archive of Critical Role's first episode has accumulated more than 5 million views – this for a three-hour video almost entirely consisting of pals sitting around a table and acting out whimsical characters. Two years and 114 mammoth episodes later, their imagined adventures have spun off a comic book, an art book, and even a line of merchandise [...] – all in addition to inspiring countless works of fan-generated art, music, and literature". Academic Emily Friedman, in the book Roleplaying Games in the Digital Age: Essays on Transmedia Storytelling, Tabletop RPGs and Fandom (2021), highlighted the length of the first campaign – "447 hours, 39 minutes" – which "outstrips the entire runs of long-running livestreams like Dice, Camera, Action (141 episodes and roughly 266 hours) and the first campaign of the prerecorded podcast The Adventure Zone (69 episodes, roughly 103 hours)". She commented that "for new viewers, 'catching up' on Critical Role is a massive task, and one that is difficult to compare to other linear storytelling forms". Jevon Phillips, for the Los Angeles Times in 2017, wrote that Critical Role "is bare bones. Mercer guides the narrative action as dungeon master, and a group of players [...] sit at a table and play out scenarios – sometimes for more than four hours". Phillips also wrote that "combining the two – watching people onscreen (online or TV) who are playing role-playing games – would seem to go a step too far in terms of our need to be entertained. [...] The fact that these shows can average hundreds of thousands of views is probably lost on those who don't regularly watch TV online (re: older viewers)".

Critics have emphasized the emotional story beats in the first campaign. Ryan Teitman, for Slate, wrote "sure, it's corny, but the actors sell their performances so well that you really begin to invest in their emotional arcs". Teitman highlighted the emotional impact of a devastating city-wide attack: "in the midst of the chaos, they search the streets, desperately looking for beloved friends and allies. And in those moments, I forgot that I was watching D&D—I only saw the anguish on the faces of each of the actors as everything their characters had come to love came crashing down around them. I wondered how they could possibly deal with so much death and destruction". Friedman, for the Los Angeles Review of Books, commented that Critical Role's "maximalist" production design allows the viewer to watch all players at once which can create "unexpectedly moving moments". Friedman highlighted one such moment towards the end of the campaign: "As other players take their turns in heated combat, we can also see, in one corner, Sam Riegel's puckish face collapse in grief as he realizes his character can cast a spell that will save the world, but at the cost of his plans to save the character played by his friend Liam O'Brien—who whispers 'I love you' in response to Riegel's 'I'm sorry'." In October 2023, Noelle Warner of CBR opined that "Scanlan's ninth-level counterspell is not only one of the best moments in Critical Role – it might be one of the best narrative moments in gaming, period. It's an instance of seemingly infinite complexity – somehow, one moment summarizes the relationships between Vox Machina, the players themselves, and themes of heroism, sacrifice, and found family. Suddenly, two men are crying at the table, and the magic of Dungeons & Dragons, tabletop games, and games as a whole is laid bare".

=== Where to start ===
On where to start the Critical Role series, critics are divided between Campaign One and Campaign Two. Alexandria Turney, for Screen Rant in 2020, highlighted that starting Critical Role at all can be a "little daunting" and that campaign one's "quality is noticeably lacking compared to future episodes which can be off-putting for those not already invested", while campaign two is "highly recommended for new Critters to watch, as it makes it easier to fall in love with the cast, which then makes it easier to go back and watch some of the lower-quality sessions of the first campaign". However, Emily Duncan of Tor.com suggested in 2021 that new viewers begin with the first campaign because the viewer would know the exact time commitment compared to an ongoing campaign. Duncan also commented on the show's early production value – "the audio quality on the first twenty or so episodes is a little rough, and there's some expected awkwardness as the group takes something that had been personal and private into the public eye". Duncan highlighted:

A popular consensus, and one I recommend, is starting at episode 24, which is the beginning of the Briarwood arc when the group ends up in a revenge quest for Percy, taking on a vampire power couple who murdered his family. Starting here skips over the first two arcs, The Mines of Kraghammer and the Adventures in Vasselheim (also called the Trial of the Take), but everyone at the table is more comfortable and the energy of the group is more vibrant after the removal of a player who caused some tension within the first two arcs. Because the campaign already drops you randomly at the beginning of a quest point, it's easy to just start a little later on and pick up quickly enough on what has happened previously.

Caitlyn Ng Man Chuen, also for CBR in 2023, similarly highlighted skipping the early episodes of Campaign One and jumping to the Briarwood arc since it can be "a little boring or off-putting" due to poor production quality and the in medias res transition from Critical Role's home-game. Chuen included the caveat that "the first campaign is still a great place to start, though, especially because it's a big part of why the show is so well-known now". She also recommended the animated series which adapts the campaign "for those that are even more pressed for time or simply don't want to take in a hundred episodes of old content". Warner viewed Critical Role as becoming a more polished show in subsequent campaigns and that "the first campaign feels like an epic tale told around the campfire at the end of a long day on the road. That's not to say that the more recent play style is particularly better or worse – it's simply different, and a viewer's enjoyment of one campaign over another will come down to personal preference. There are a lot of long hours at the table that are more worth skipping through than watching when it comes to the first campaign, but the chaotic, often confused energy is something special when fans revisit the origins of Critical Role. The show's change in tone and structure feels even more poignant when fans consider the early episodes' ephemerality".

== Adaptations ==
- The campaign sourcebook, Critical Role: Tal'Dorei Campaign Setting (2017), is a guide to the setting of campaign one. It was published by Critical Role and Green Ronin Publishing under the Wizards of the Coast Open Game License and is not considered "official" Dungeons & Dragons material. The book is now out of print — a revised edition, titled Tal'Dorei Campaign Setting Reborn (2022), was released by Darrington Press. The revised edition reflects the twenty year progression of time between campaign one and campaign two.
- The comic series, Critical Role: Vox Machina Origins, is an adaptation of the group's game before the show.
- The animated show adaptation, The Legend of Vox Machina, also includes a canon story that takes place within the pre-stream time frame. After the show was picked up by Amazon and "Amazon Prime Video ordered an additional 14 episodes, for a total of 24 episodes across two seasons", Critical Role announced that the animated show would adapt the full Briarwood arc along with other storylines from the game.
