= The Mighty Nein (disambiguation) =

The Mighty Nein is a fictional group of adventurers appearing in the Dungeons & Dragons web series Critical Role. Specifically it may refer to:

- The Mighty Nein, the second campaign of Critical Role which is centered on this adventuring party
- The Mighty Nein (2025), the animated series adaptation of Critical Role's second campaign

== Print media ==
- Critical Role: The Mighty Nein Origins, a graphic novel series that serves as a prequel to Critical Role's second campaign
- Critical Role: The Mighty Nein – The Nine Eyes of Lucien, a novel focused on Lucien, the antagonist of Critical Role campaign two, and his life before and after he met the Mighty Nein
