= Critical Role: The Mighty Nein Origins =

American comic series

- 2021 Free Comic Book Day one-shot cover. Cover by Tyler Walpole.
- Date: 2021–2025
- No. of issues: 10
- Main characters: The Mighty Nein
- Publisher: Dark Horse Comics

Creative team
- Writers: List: Sam Maggs; Jody Houser; Cecil Castellucci; Kevin Burke; Chris "Doc" Wyatt; Mae Catt; Kendra Wells
- Artists: List: Tyler Walpole; Hunter Severn Bonyun; Selina Espiritu; William Kirkby; Guilherme Balbi; Leonardo Cino
- Letterers: Ariana Maher
- Colourists: Cathy Le; Diana Sousa; Eren Angiolini
- Creators: Matthew Mercer; Cast of Critical Role

Chronology
- Followed by: Critical Role campaign two

Critical Role: The Mighty Nein Origins is a graphic novel series, published by Dark Horse Comics, based on the American Dungeons & Dragons actual play series Critical Role. The series acts as a prequel story for Critical Role's second campaign. Each book explores a backstory before the characters became the adventuring party known as The Mighty Nein. Eight volumes were published between 2021 and 2024. Additionally, one-shot issues were released for Free Comic Book Day in 2021 and 2025.

== Premise ==
Each volume in the Critical Role: The Mighty Nein Origins graphic novel series explores an individual backstory of a player character from Critical Role's second campaign before they became the adventuring party known as The Mighty Nein. These characters are: Jester Lavorre (created by Laura Bailey), Caleb Widogast (created by Liam O'Brien), Yasha Nydoorin (created by Ashley Johnson), Nott the Brave (created by Sam Riegel), Mollymauk Tealeaf (created by Taliesin Jaffe), Beauregard Lionett (created by Marisha Ray), Fjord Stone (created by Travis Willingham) and Caduceus Clay (created by Jaffe).

== Publication history ==
=== Creative origins ===
Critical Role began as a private Dungeons & Dragons game with Matthew Mercer as the Dungeon Master and creator of the Exandria setting. Each cast member created their own character to play in the campaign. In 2015, Geek & Sundry moved "the group's existing home game into its studio" as a weekly web series; the first campaign focused on the story of Vox Machina. Critical Role started their second campaign, with new characters, in 2018; this campaign focused on The Mighty Nein adventuring party.

=== 2020–present ===
In November 2020, Critical Role announced that a graphic novel series exploring the backstories of The Mighty Nein main characters would be published by Dark Horse Comics. Each book has a different creative team and was released as a hardcover. Critical Role: The Mighty Nein Origins – Home was released in August 2021 for Free Comic Book Day. In December 2021, Dark Horse announced that many of the titles in the series would have a delayed release date due to a mixture of circumstances. An omnibus – titled Critical Role: The Mighty Nein Origins Library Edition Volume 1 – collecting the Jester Lavorre, Caleb Widogast, Yasha Nydoorin, and Nott the Brave stories was released in October 2023. The second library edition volume, collecting the Mollymauk Tealeaf, Beauregard Lionett, Fjord Stone and Caduceus Clay stories, was released in December 2024.

Critical Role: The Mighty Nein Origins – Acquired Taste was released in May 2025 for Free Comic Book Day; the issue focuses on Beau and Caleb in Bassuras waiting to meet a contact at a dinner theater show themed around Vox Machina. A boxed set collecting the eight hardcover volumes is scheduled to be released in November 2025. In June 2025, it was announced that The Mighty Nein Origins would be adapted for the digital vertical scroll format on Webtoon. This version's release began in November 2025.

== Reception ==
In Publishers Weekly's "Best-selling Books Week Ending February 18, 2022", Critical Role: The Mighty Nein Origins–Caleb Widogast was 14th in "Hardcover Frontline Fiction". In USA Today's "Top 150 Weekly Best Sellers", Caleb Widogast debuted at #144 on February 17, 2022. Brian Hibbs, in The Beat's analysis of 2022 comics sales, highlighted that Caleb Widogast was one of eight Dark Horse titles in the "Top 750" and that it was Dark Horse's 4th best selling title with 15,000 copies sold. In Publishers Weekly's "Best-selling Books Week Ending February 10, 2023", Critical Role: The Mighty Nein Origins–Nott the Brave was 18th in "Hardcover Frontline Fiction". Colorist Diana Sousa was nominated for the 2023 Eisner Award in "Best Coloring" for her work on Critical Role: Vox Machina Origins, The Mighty Nein Origins: Yasha Nydoorin, The Mighty Nein Origins: Fjord Stone, and The Mighty Nein Origins: Caleb Widogast.

Corey Patterson of CBR opined that the "success" of Critical Role comic series Vox Machina Origins and The Mighty Nein Origins "highlights why the comic book medium may be the best way to tell Critical Role stories" and "it could be argued that comic book illustrations are better at unpacking Critical Role's immersive world, especially when it comes to the campaign events retold in The Mighty Nein Origins". Patterson noted that unlike the Vox Machina Origins series, The Mighty Nein Origins "series specifically structures each volume around a specific character from the party". He commented that the latter series "does a brilliant job of homing in on each party member's backstory and unique experiences" as each volume "pinpoints the stages that created their characters and eventually led to them crossing paths with the adventuring party".

== Books ==
Title	Writer(s)	Contributor(s)	Artist	Colorist	Letterer	Publication date	Ref.
Graphic novels
Critical Role: The Mighty Nein Origins – Jester Lavorre	Sam Maggs	Matthew Mercer; Laura Bailey	Hunter Severn Bonyun	Cathy Le	Ariana Maher	November 3, 2021	
Critical Role: The Mighty Nein Origins – Caleb Widogast	Jody Houser	Matthew Mercer; Liam O'Brien	Selina Espiritu	Diana Sousa	Ariana Maher	February 9, 2022	
Critical Role: The Mighty Nein Origins – Yasha Nydoorin	Cecil Castellucci	Matthew Mercer; Ashley Johnson	William Kirkby	Diana Sousa	Ariana Maher	August 17, 2022	
Critical Role: The Mighty Nein Origins – Fjord Stone	Kevin Burke; Chris "Doc" Wyatt	Matthew Mercer; Travis Willingham	Selina Espiritu	Diana Sousa	Ariana Maher	December 14, 2022	
Critical Role: The Mighty Nein Origins – Nott the Brave	Sam Maggs	Matthew Mercer; Sam Riegel	William Kirkby	Eren Angiolini	Ariana Maher	January 17, 2023	
Critical Role: The Mighty Nein Origins – Mollymauk Tealeaf	Jody Houser	Matthew Mercer; Taliesin Jaffe	Hunter Severn Bonyun	Cathy Le	Ariana Maher	May 17, 2023	
Critical Role: The Mighty Nein Origins – Beauregard Lionett	Mae Catt; Matthew Mercer; Marisha Ray	—N/a	Guilherme Balbi	Diana Sousa	Ariana Maher	May 15, 2024	
Critical Role: The Mighty Nein Origins – Caduceus Clay	Taliesin Jaffe; Kendra Wells; Matthew Mercer	—N/a	Selina Espiritu	Eren Angiolini	Ariana Maher	June 19, 2024	
One-shots
Critical Role: The Mighty Nein Origins – Home	Jody Houser	—N/a	Tyler Walpole		Ariana Maher	August 14, 2021	
Critical Role: The Mighty Nein Origins – Acquired Taste	Sam Maggs	—N/a	Leonardo Cino	Diana Sousa	Ariana Maher	May 3, 2025	

=== Collected editions ===
Title	Material collected	Format	Publication date	Pages	ISBN	Ref
Critical Role: The Mighty Nein Origins Library Edition Volume 1	Critical Role: The Mighty Nein Origins – Jester Lavorre; Critical Role: The Mighty Nein Origins – Caleb Widogast; Critical Role: The Mighty Nein Origins – Yasha Nydoorin; Critical Role: The Mighty Nein Origins – Nott the Brave	Hardcover	October 11, 2023	224	978-1-5067-2380-8	
Critical Role: The Mighty Nein Origins Library Edition Volume 2	Critical Role: The Mighty Nein Origins – Mollymauk Tealeaf; Critical Role: The Mighty Nein Origins – Beauregard Lionett; Critical Role: The Mighty Nein Origins – Fjord Stone; Critical Role: The Mighty Nein Origins – Caduceus Clay	Hardcover	December 3, 2024	224	978-1-5067-2381-5	
Critical Role: The Mighty Nein Origins Boxed Set	Critical Role: The Mighty Nein Origins – Jester Lavorre; Critical Role: The Mighty Nein Origins – Caleb Widogast; Critical Role: The Mighty Nein Origins – Yasha Nydoorin; Critical Role: The Mighty Nein Origins – Nott the Brave; Critical Role: The Mighty Nein Origins – Mollymauk Tealeaf; Critical Role: The Mighty Nein Origins – Beauregard Lionett; Critical Role: The Mighty Nein Origins – Fjord Stone; Critical Role: The Mighty Nein Origins – Caduceus Clay	Hardcover	November 4, 2025	448	978-1-5067-5302-7	
