= Critical Role campaign two =

Campaign of the web series Critical Role

- Campaign poster art by Matteo Scalera and Moreno Dinisio
- Starring: Travis Willingham; Marisha Ray; Taliesin Jaffe; Ashley Johnson; Sam Riegel; Liam O'Brien; Laura Bailey; Matthew Mercer
- No. of episodes: 141

Release
- Original network: Twitch; YouTube; Alpha (Note: Until 2019.)
- Original release: January 11, 2018 – June 3, 2021

Season chronology
- ← Previous; Campaign one Next → Campaign three

The second campaign of the Dungeons & Dragons web series Critical Role premiered on January 11, 2018—four months after the conclusion of the first campaign—and concluded on June 3, 2021. The series starred Travis Willingham, Marisha Ray, Taliesin Jaffe, Ashley Johnson, Sam Riegel, Liam O'Brien, and Laura Bailey as the players with Matthew Mercer as the Dungeon Master.

The campaign is an actual play which follows the Mighty Nein, a party of seven adventurers, in their travels across the continent of Wildemount. It occurs at a time of very high tensions between the Dwendalian Empire and the Kryn Dynasty—two of Wildemount's major powers, which are divided by the Ashkeeper Peaks mountain range. Over the course of the campaign, the Mighty Nein work towards rooting out political corruption, especially within the Cerberus Assembly, and establishing peace between the Kryn Dynasty and the Dwendalian Empire after war breaks out. They also thwart apocalyptic threats such as Tharizdûn attempting to escape his imprisonment and the Somnovem attempting to return to the Prime Material Plane.

Campaign two aired each Thursday at 7 p.m. PT on Twitch, YouTube, and Alpha. When production switched from Geek & Sundry to Critical Role Productions in February 2019, distribution on Alpha and the other Geek & Sundry channels ended; the campaign then aired on Critical Role Productions' official channels. It consisted of 141 episodes with a total run time of over 550 hours. Additionally, the show has returned multiple times with specials set after the conclusion of the campaign. Critical Role won multiple awards during the campaign, such as the 2019 Webby Winner and People's Voice Winner in the "Video Series & Channels – Games" category from the Webby Awards, and the 2019 Audience Honor in the "Games" category from the Shorty Awards. An animated television adaptation for Amazon Prime Video, titled The Mighty Nein, was announced in January 2023 and premiered on November 19, 2025.

== Cast ==
Campaign two featured all eight primary cast members from the end of Campaign one, in addition to occasional guests. Ashley Johnson was absent for several lengthy periods over the first 86 episodes due to her filming schedule for the NBC drama Blindspot, which ran from 2015 to 2020.

Two of the player-characters for this campaign are based on characters their actors had previously created. Jester is based on a character Bailey had portrayed in two one-shot adventures, one with GameSpot and one with Kinda Funny. Mollymauk was originally designed by Jaffe as a possible replacement for Percy, his character in Campaign one, in the event of Percy's death.

=== Main ===
Campaign two had eight cast members—seven players who form an adventuring party and the Dungeon Master (DM).

- Travis Willingham as Fjord Stone, a half-orc warlock who unwittingly makes a pact with a malevolent leviathan named Uk'otoa when he is drowning at sea. After a period of self-discovery, Fjord breaks his pact with Uk'otoa and becomes a follower of the Wildmother, who also has dominion over the sea, and multiclasses into a paladin.
- Marisha Ray as Beauregard "Beau" Lionett, a human monk working for the Order of the Cobalt Soul to root out corruption in the Dwendalian Empire. Beau is initially presented as being resentful of authority and anti-social, and rises to the rank of Expositor to carry out sensitive, covert investigations.
- Taliesin Jaffe as:
  - Mollymauk "Molly" Tealeaf, a tiefling blood hunter (Note: Blood hunter is a homebrew class developed by Mercer.) and con artist working in a traveling circus. Mollymauk is killed when the Mighty Nein attempts to free party members from a slaver group.
  - Caduceus Clay, a firbolg cleric in service of the Wildmother, goddess of the wilderness. Caduceus is searching for a way to save his home from a magical blight. The Mighty Nein recruits Caduceus before the party's second attempt to rescue their captured members; he remains with the group because he believes it will aid in his journey.
  - Kingsley Tealeaf, a blood hunter/rogue who awakens in Molly's body in the final episode of the campaign.
- Ashley Johnson as Yasha Nydoorin, an aasimar barbarian who is exiled from her homeland in Xhorhas for marrying outside the strict arranged-marriage traditions of her clan. She is haunted by her time as the "Orphanmaker" and her involvement in a cult that gave its followers control over her.
- Sam Riegel as Nott the Brave, a goblin rogue who escaped jail with Caleb and wishes to support his growing magical potential. She was previously a halfling woman named Revetha "Veth" Brenatto and was cursed to be a goblin after a goblin raiding party captured her family. She is returned to her halfling body in episode 97 and struggles with her conflicting desires to continue adventuring with the Mighty Nein, and to stay with her husband and son.
- Liam O'Brien as Caleb Widogast, a human wizard who was enrolled at the Soltryce Academy, the Dwendalian Empire's premier magical school, until he was chosen to train to become an assassin for the Empire. This training was physically and mentally traumatizing, leading to a breakdown. Caleb is known for inventing spells. The Zemnian accent O'Brien used for Caleb "resembles real-life German"; when spoken, Modern German was used for the fictional language Zemnian. Mercer explained this was "a narrative reference/tool" based on O'Brien's "love of German", however, "Zemnian has no specific language equivalent".
- Laura Bailey as Jester Lavorre, a tiefling cleric who follows an obscure entity known as the Traveler. Her relationship with the Traveler is temporarily strained when she learns he is not actually a deity as originally claimed, but an archfey named Artagan, a recurring non-player character (NPC) from Campaign one.
- Matthew Mercer as the Dungeon Master, who organizes the gameplay, describes the effects the player characters' actions have on the world and narrative, and plays the NPCs. He introduced 1,144 unique NPCs during this campaign.

=== Guest ===
There were seven guest players for Campaign two. Though he plays a different character, Chris Perkins is the only guest player who also appeared in Campaign one.

- Khary Payton as Shakäste, a human cleric who aids the party as they investigate a gnoll attack in Alfield.
- Mara Holmes as Calianna, a half-elf sorcerer who enlists the party to help her find and destroy an artifact.
- Ashly Burch as Keg, a dwarven fighter who joins the party in the fight against the Iron Shepherds.
- Sumalee Montano as Nila, a firbolg druid whose husband and son were taken by the Iron Shepherds
- Deborah Ann Woll as Twiggy, a gnome arcane trickster who stows away aboard the party's ship with a dangerous relic.
- Chris Perkins as Spurt, a kobold inventor who joins the party as they cross into Xhorhas and dies within minutes of his introduction to the Mighty Nein.
- Mica Burton as Reani, an aasimar druid and self-styled protector of Uthodurn who aids the party in their quest to re-forge a legendary sword.

== Production and format ==
The show's format was initially largely unchanged from the later episodes of the first campaign with videos of the cast and battle maps presented in three-to-five-hour episodes. During the second campaign's run, technical changes to subtitles and character information were introduced. A D&D Beyond-branded Twitch overlay was available to viewers using web browsers to watch live after February 28, 2019. The overlay displayed character-status information and allowed viewers to access digital character sheets. This was not available on the YouTube platform or for Twitch video on demand (VOD) viewers. Episodes 1 through 53 were captioned by the same fan group that transcribed Campaign one. From Episode 54 onward, episodes were transcribed live on Twitch by a professional transcription service. The YouTube VOD relied on YouTube's auto-generated captions until the broadcast transcription was reviewed and added "within a week or so of upload".

Four camera layout during an ocean battle scene in the Episode: "Dark Waters".

The show was primarily filmed in a simultaneous multi-camera setup with two cameras at the players and a third at Mercer, the Dungeon Master. A fourth camera was used during battle scenes "to show a close-up of the miniatures and models used for in-game combat". The audience sees the camera feeds "arranged in a single window". The cast is seated together at a custom game table which was introduced to the set during the first campaign. It was designed by Wyrmwood to allow the cast to "see each other and interact with each other" while they are filmed from multiple sides. Mercer is positioned behind a gamemaster's screen in the inset portion with space for his notes; in the center of the table, there is an area for the miniatures and maps used in combat.

=== Changes during the COVID-19 pandemic ===
On March 17, 2020, as a result of the COVID-19 pandemic, the show went on an unplanned hiatus. The show returned with the 100th episode of the campaign on July 20, 2020; before then, a video explaining how the production team was implementing the guidelines within the Hollywood White Paper and setting out the social distancing requirements that would be followed was uploaded to Critical Role's YouTube channel. The measures included the cast being seated at separate tables, spaced at least seven feet (2.1 m) apart, rather than being seated around their custom game table. The cast used "laser pointers when issuing directions to the DM during combat". In addition, each cast member had an individual camera and the on-set production team was reduced to a skeleton crew. The show also switched to pre-recorded episodes rather than airing live. These changes were present until the end of the campaign on June 3, 2021.

=== Post-campaign ===
Title card for the Echoes of the Solstice which features the cast in cosplay of their characters.

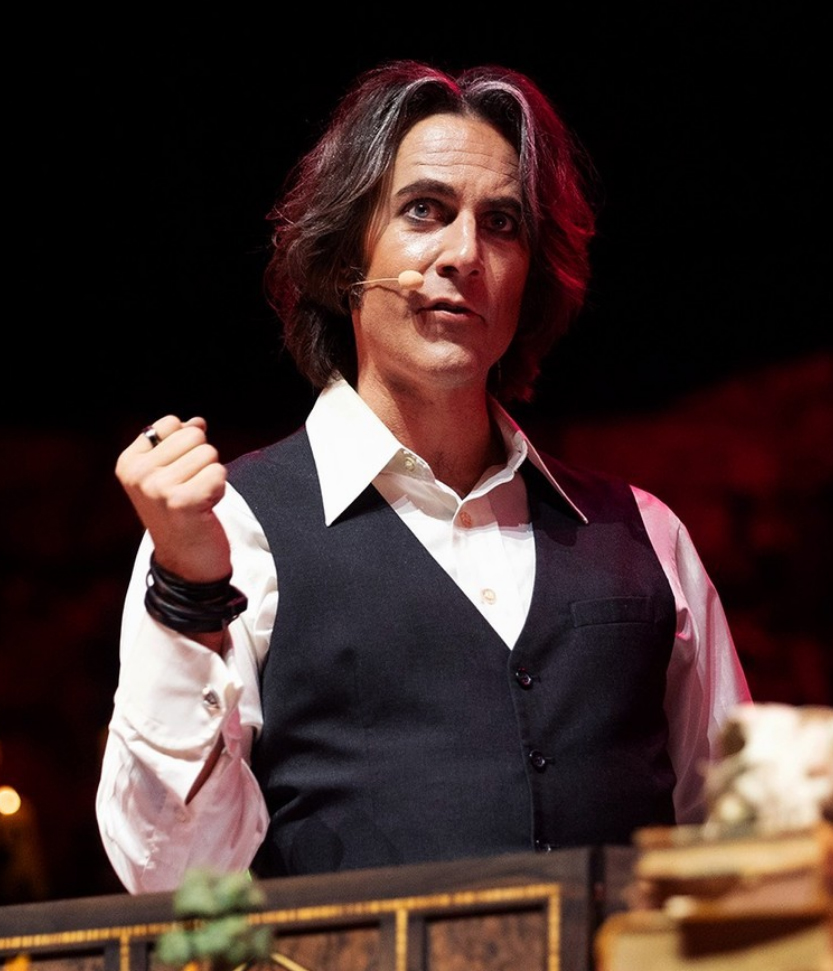
Photo of Mercer taken during the live show in Wembley Arena.

In October 2022, Critical Role announced a two-part special titled The Mighty Nein Reunited. The canonical story begins several months after the conclusion of the second campaign with the cast reprising their roles. Part One aired on November 17, 2022, and Part Two aired on December 1, 2022. The Mighty Nein Reunited was streamed on Twitch and YouTube, and was simulcast at Cinemark Theatres in the United States and South America.

The second post-campaign special, The Mighty Nein Reunion: Echoes of the Solstice, was recorded live on October 25, 2023, at the OVO Arena Wembley. Insider highlighted that while previous live shows "were in venues with 2,000 to 3,000 audience members", this arena has a much larger capacity. GamesRadar+ noted that this live show, with 12,000 tickets, sold out "in less than 6 minutes". In addition to the regular Twitch and YouTube livestream, it was shown in Cinemark Theatres in the United States and in Cineplex Theatres in Canada on October 26, 2023. The cast reprised their roles in a canonical story focused on the Mighty Nein coming together in the wake of events surrounding the Apogee Solstice in 843 PD. Beau and Caleb, as NPCs played by Mercer in the third campaign, were among the many people who failed to stop Archmage Ludinus Da'leth from utilizing the solstice in a ritual which resulted in the red moon Ruidus being locked in the sky and arcane powers across Exandria going awry. The fate of Beau and Caleb after the ritual is unknown. During a panel at MCM Comic Con London after the special, cast members mentioned that they hoped to revisit the Mighty Nein in future stories. Willingham highlighted that after playing level 20 characters in Echoes of the Solstice, he "felt like there was a whole boatload of story to come" and that "every session leads to the next story beat or the next idea or something that you wanna do".

In August 2024, Mercer started to seed the return of the players as their previous campaign parties within arcs in the third campaign which would allow the cast to "play as Vox Machina, the Mighty Nein, and Bells Hells in what would technically be the same fight, though spread out over their respective targets". In October 2024, the cast then reprised their roles as the Mighty Nein while also role-playing as the Bells Hells. In April 2025, Riegel was the game master of the limited series spinoff Wildemount Wildlings which focused on campers at Veth's Wildemount Wildlings Camp. It also featured two Mighty Nein camp counselors, with Ray and Johnson reprising their roles as Beau and Yasha respectively.

As part of the show's tenth anniversary celebration in 2025, Critical Role announced a live tour which occurred in cities across the United States and Australia. The June 2025 live shows in Sydney and Melbourne featured two blended parties with characters from both the Mighty Nein and Bells Hells on the search for Ludinus Da'leth in the Shattered Teeth. The October 2025 live show at Radio City Music Hall in New York featured the wedding between Jester and Fjord. The cast reprised their Mighty Nein roles on the 2026 Echoes of Exandria live show tour.

== Broadcast ==
The second campaign premiered on January 11, 2018, four months after the conclusion of the first campaign. The show aired each Thursday at 7 p.m. PT. Like the previous campaign, episodes 1 through 51 were aired live on Twitch and YouTube channels run by Geek & Sundry, and on the Legendary Digital Networks' Alpha service. Critical Role Productions separated from Geek & Sundry and Legendary Digital Networks in February 2019. After the split, the Critical Role series ceased to be distributed on Alpha, and live broadcasts and VODs were exclusively distributed on Critical Role's YouTube and Twitch channels. Alpha was shut down several weeks after the split.

In May 2021, the cast announced Campaign two would shortly end but "the Mighty Nein's story wasn't finished". ComicBook.com reported that the second campaign had aired for over 550 hours. Collider stated that the campaign included 100 hours dedicated to battles with "440 slain villains". The finale aired on June 3, 2021; at seven hours it was also the longest episode of the campaign.

== Setting ==
The campaign is set in Exandria, a fictional world Matthew Mercer created for the game. The second campaign is set about 20 years after Vox Machina's final battle against Vecna in Critical Role's first campaign, and except for a few secondary characters has a new cast of adventurers. Most of the story takes place on the continent of Wildemount, which is located to the east of Tal'Dorei, the setting of the first campaign. It takes place at a time of very high tensions between the Dwendalian Empire and the Kryn Dynasty—two of Wildemount's major powers, which are divided by the Ashkeeper Peaks mountain range—and war is imminent.

Western Wildemount is governed by the Dwendalian Empire and is ruled by King Bertrand Dwendal. A council of powerful archmages called the Cerberus Assembly act as advisors to the House of Dwendal. The Empire regards the region of Xhorhas, which occupies the eastern side of the continent, as an inhospitable wasteland. Xhorhas is governed by the Kryn Dynasty, is ruled by the Bright Queen Leylas Kryn, and is primarily home to the drow and other races considered to be monstrous. The Menagerie Coast occupies the southwestern coastline and is governed by the Clovis Concord, a coalition of eight city-states that includes Nicodranas and Port Damali. The tundra in the northernmost region of Wildemount is known as the Greying Wildlands; the harsh environment leaves it sparsely populated compared with other regions. Some parts of the story take place on the Lucidian Ocean, off the shore of the Menagerie Coast, and on Eiselcross, a frozen continent north of Wildemount.

== Episodes ==
=== 2018 ===
List of episodes in 2018
| Episode | Title | Original release date | Notes |
|---|---|---|---|
| 1 | "Curious Beginnings" | January 11, 2018 | - |
A group of seven adventurers—Fjord, Beauregard, Caleb, Nott, Jester, Mollymauk and Yasha—meet in a tavern in Trostenwald before going to a carnival. During a performance involving a strange toad, an elderly audience member is transfigured into an undead creature. The party kill the creature but the guards are suspicious of them and urge them not to leave town until an investigation has been carried out.
| 2 | "A Show of Scrutiny" | January 18, 2018 | Ashley Johnson is absent this episode. |
The group investigate the incident at the carnival while becoming acquainted with one another. They speak with town residents the following day, and that night they return to the carnival grounds, where they witness two guards affected by a similar undead transformation. The toad creature flees.
| 3 | "The Midnight Chase" | January 25, 2018 | Ashley Johnson is absent this episode. |
The party defeat the undead guards and chase the toad-like creature, which they now know to be a Nergaliid. The party barter for passage to an island in the local lake, to which the creature has fled, and defeat it.
| 4 | "Disparate Pieces" | February 1, 2018 | - |
Returning to town with the head of the Nergaliid, the party explain what happened to the officials. Gustav, the owner of the ruined carnival, takes responsibility for the incident and gives the party a cart to thank them. The party put their affairs in order, leave the town in good standing, and begin traveling north.
| 5 | "The Open Road" | February 8, 2018 | Ashley Johnson is absent for a few episodes, returning halfway through episode 9. |
Traveling north, the party come across the village of Alfield, which is under attack by gnolls. Watchmaster Bryce is offering a bounty for gnoll ears. The party aid the village's defense and rest at the local tavern.
| 6 | "The Howling Mines" | February 15, 2018 | - |
Following direction from Watchmaster Bryce, the party track the gnolls to an abandoned mine, where a strange ritual is underway, and fight a number of gnolls.
| 7 | "Hush" | February 22, 2018 | Guest stars Khary Payton. |
During their investigation of the gnoll-infested mine, the party discover the gnolls have been feeding the abducted townsfolk to a manticore. With the help of a cleric named Shakäste, they slay the manticore and the remaining gnolls. They loot the cave and return to Alfield, where they receive rewards and thanks from the villagers.
| 8 | "The Gates of Zadash" | March 1, 2018 | - |
While collecting payment from Watchmaster Bryce, the party need to establish a name for themselves for the village's ledger. They settle on "Mighty Nein" and head north towards Zadash. When a group of bandits approach, they pretend to have "extreme syphilis" to avoid a potential attack. In Zadash, they shop at the Pentamarket and discover a magic store named The Invulnerable Vagrant, which is run by the firbolg Pumat Sol.
| 9 | "Steam and Conversation" | March 8, 2018 | - |
Beau and Fjord attend a meeting of unhappy Empire residents who are plotting an uprising but are concerned by the zeal of a member named Ulog. Caleb and Jester go to the Tri-Spire, an expensive part of town. The party take on a contract to investigate a sewer-dwelling creature that recently killed a few guards.
| 10 | "Waste and Webs" | March 15, 2018 | - |
Descending into the sewers, the party encounter an enormous spider. During their exploration, they uncover a secret route into the Tri-Spire, which could present a means of more easily entering the expensive part of town. They save a man who was trapped in the spider's webs and learn from him the password needed to meet with "The Gentleman", a local crime boss.
| 11 | "Zemnian Nights" | March 22, 2018 | Ashley Johnson is absent for a few episodes, returning episode 14. |
A storm passes over Zadash and Yasha leaves during the night. Caleb peruses a local bookstore in search of "historical romances" because he had earlier found useful spells written in them. Fjord, Beau, and Caleb attend another meeting of rebels and take on a job for the group; they must infiltrate the houses of city officials with Ulog to find evidence of corruption between city officials and nobles.
| 12 | "Midnight Espionage" | March 29, 2018 | - |
The Mighty Nein use a city-wide festival as cover to infiltrate Lord Sutan's house and steal his wax seal. Having obtained the seal, they go to the High Richter's house, hoping to frame him. In disguise, the party discover papers that prove the High Richter imprisoned Ulog's wife despite knowing she was innocent. When confronted by the High Richter, Ulog triggers an explosion, killing himself as well. The party flee and witness Xhorhasian assassins in a magical battle at the Zauberspire. They retreat into the sewer and are confronted by another Xhorhasian, a drow.
| 13 | "Lost & Found" | April 5, 2018 | - |
The party subdue the drow and discover it was carrying a "Beacon", a device shaped like a strange dodecahedron. After some debate, the party return the item to the drow and let them leave but a guard kills the drow, and the party steal the "Beacon". Dolan and Horris, two of the rebels, are concerned about being connected to the night's events; Fjord agrees to find a way to smuggle them out of the city. The party rejoin Yasha and head to the secret hideout of The Gentleman, and one of his attendants recognizes Mollymauk.
| 14 | "Fleeting Memories" | April 12, 2018 | Laura Bailey is absent this episode, although she was communicating with the rest of the cast through text. |
The party meet with The Gentleman in his secret basement. The Gentleman suggests an exchange of favors; he will smuggle the rebels out of the city in exchange for a job being done. The Mighty Nein are hired to investigate a subterranean ruin, which they access via an underground river.
| 15 | "Where the River Goes" | April 19, 2018 | - |
The party follow the river, dealing with traps and local fauna in the ruins. They discover a research chamber dating to the Age of Arcanum. The also find a magical sword and meet a strange, ghostly figure.
| 16 | "A Favor in Kind" | April 26, 2018 | - |
The ghostly figure, Siff Duthar, attacks the party with mental abilities. The Mighty Nein destroy it and examine a nook that contains jewelry. Caleb identifies the magic sword in the ruin as the Magician's Judge. Fjord receives a strange vision from his patron and the party give the loot from the ruin to The Gentleman but withhold the sword. They complete several errands in town and learn more about the Beacon.
| 17 | "Harvest Close" | May 3, 2018 | - |
The Harvest Close festival is held in Zadash, and the Mighty Nein take part in several of the games that are being held. The party discover the Empire has declared war on Xhorhas, though this is not yet widely known. They take part in a fighting ring known as the Victory Pit.
| 18 | "Whispers of War" | May 10, 2018 | - |
The Mighty Nein is victorious in the final battle of the Victory Pit. With war looming, they debate their next actions. The party relax at their hotel in the Tri-Spire, and Caleb explains his dark past to Nott and Beau: his magical talent was recognized by Trent Ikithon, a member of the Cerberus Assembly, while he was training at Soltryce Academy. Caleb was given extra training to become an assassin for the Empire but was manipulated into murdering his family as a final test of devotion. The realization of Caleb's actions caused a mental breakdown.
| 19 | "The Gentleman's Path" | May 17, 2018 | - |
The Mighty Nein decide to avoid the war, and leave Zadash to deal with two important missions for The Gentleman. They must first reconnect with an old friend named Ophelia Mardun 350 miles (560 km) northwest on the outskirts of Shadycreek Run, who has requested his aid in stabilizing her situation. Second, they are to investigate a safe house in the Labenda Swamp to see why it had recently gone dark.
| 20 | "Labenda Awaits" | May 24, 2018 | - |
On their way to Labenda Swamp, Yasha has a notable dream. Jester saves a kenku child named Kiri whom they take with them to the swamp village Berleben. The Mighty Nein meet The Gentleman's contact in the Keystone Pub. In the evening, Caleb and Nott discuss Ikithon.
| 21 | "Stalker in the Swamp" | May 31, 2018 | Guest stars Mara Holmes. |
Calianna, a half-elf who is one-tenth dragon, approaches the party. She wishes to find and destroy a ritual bowl that is being sought by the Cult of the Caustic Heart. On the way to the safe house, they fight a troll and find the safe house has been overrun by merrow. Caleb finds the bowl, Yasha shatters it, and Ford hears the voice of Uk'otoa, his patron and the source of his power. Calianna goes to Port Damali.
| 22 | "Lost Treasures" | June 7, 2018 | - |
The next day, the party fight with more merrow. Jester discovers a mysterious orb, a Cloven Crystal, which is suddenly sucked into Fjord's body. With no immediate answers to this development available, the party secure the safe house using dynamite to blow up the merrow's nexus room. They then start their second errand by traveling north.
| 23 | "Have Bird, Will Travel" | June 14, 2018 | - |
The party discuss routes to Shadycreek Run. Caleb suggests they avoid the route through Rexxentrum given their timetable. They decide to take the second route through the gnomish city of Hupperdook, where they arrive after several days of travel.
| 24 | "The Hour of Honor" | June 21, 2018 | Ashley Johnson is absent this episode. |
Every night is a party in Hupperdook, so the Mighty Nein partake in the festivities. They spend the next day tracing Beau's stolen coin purse and discover gnomish children took it. Their parents were arrested for worshiping the Changebringer, an outlawed god. Although on a timetable, they decide to help the children by finding a way to free their parents.
| 25 | "Divergent Paths" | June 28, 2018 | Travis Willingham and Laura Bailey are absent this episode. Liam O'Brien joins the cast via web video. |
The party agree to take care of Hupperdook prison's out-of-control clockwork warden in exchange for the freedom of the gnomish children's parents. After their success, the Mighty Nein reunite the family and leave Kiri in their care. On their way to Shadycreek Run, the party are ambushed by a dangerous group of slavers known as Iron Shepherds. Fjord, Jester, and Yasha are kidnapped.
| 26 | "Found & Lost" | July 13, 2018 | Travis Willingham and Laura Bailey are absent this episode. Ashley Johnson is absent for a block of episodes, returning episode 34. Guest stars Ashly Burch. |
During the search for their missing friends, the party meet a dwarven woman named Keg who agrees to lead the party to their friends if they agree to help her kill the Iron Shepherds. The rest of the Nein try to rescue Molly but Lorenzo, the leader of the slavers, kills him.
| 27 | "Converging Fury" | July 20, 2018 | Travis Willingham, Laura Bailey, and Taliesin Jaffe are absent this episode. Guest stars Ashly Burch and Sumalee Montano. |
Caleb, Beau, and Nott grieve as they continue toward Shady Creek Run with Keg. They meet the firbolg Nila, who is heading north to find her son who was stolen by slavers. The party meet with Ophelia Mardun, who wants retribution on the Iron Shepherds for killing her most-trusted smuggler team.
| 28 | "Within the Nest" | July 27, 2018 | Travis Willingham and Laura Bailey are absent this episode. Guest stars Ashly Burch and Sumalee Montano. |
Nila leads the party through the Savalirwood, where they meet the firbolg Caduceus Clay, the last keeper of a holy graveyard in the forest outside of Shadycreek Run. Caduceus decides to join the group. They infiltrate the Iron Shepherds' stronghold and rescue Nila's family. Nila and her family escape while the rest of the party venture deeper into the stronghold.
| 29 | "The Stalking Nightmare" | August 3, 2018 | Travis Willingham and Laura Bailey are absent this episode. Guest stars Ashly Burch and Khary Payton. Live show was broadcast from Gen Con. |
Deeper in the stronghold, the party discover and free their friend Shakäste. They kill all of the slavers, including Lorenzo, and rescue Fjord, Jester, and Yasha. Shakäste agrees to lead the other prisoners to safety outside the Empire.
| 30 | "The Journey Home" | August 9, 2018 | - |
Fjord and Jester are informed of Molly's death but Yasha is still unconscious. They loot the stronghold and discover a letter that mentions a contact named Marius LePual at the Wayfarer's Cove. Beau spends the night with Keg and the next day, the party begin to escort Ophelia Mardun to Zadash. On the road, Yasha recovers and learns of Molly's death at his grave. She temporarily leaves the party to grieve. In Zadash, the party speak with The Gentleman and raise a glass to Mollymauk Tealeaf.
| 31 | "Commerce & Chaos" | August 16, 2018 | - |
The party take two weeks of rest to pursue individual goals before regrouping. Fjord wants to head toward the Menagerie Coast to investigate an explosion on his ship that started the sequence of events that led to his bargain with Uk'otoa; it is implied Fjord unconsciously entered the pact to avoid drowning. The party agree to head to Nicodranas on the Menagerie Coast, where Jester's mother, a prostitute and entertainer, lives. Jester uses the spell Sending to inform Yasha of their destination before the party head southward.
| 32 | "Beyond the Boundaries" | August 23, 2018 | - |
The party travel southward through Alfield and stop to drink with Watchmaster Bryce. In Trostenwald, the party pay off the debt of Gustav, former owner of the carnival that had been in town, and inform him of Molly's death. The party encounter two Ettins in the Wuyun Gorge and purchase several pets from a merchant.
| 33 | "The Ruby and the Sapphire" | September 6, 2018 | Debut of Orly, a character generated through audience votes during a special Fireside Chat episode. |
The party visit Jester's mother Marion, the Ruby of the Sea, in the coastal city Nicodranas. Jester has not seen her mother in a long time and is welcomed at her establishment the Lavish Chateau. The Mighty Nein learn Marion has a client named Algar who is making trouble by claiming their relationship is exclusive. The Mighty Nein decide to try and help by searching for Algar. The group visit a lighthouse and a tavern named Wayfarer's Cove.
| 34 | "Encroaching Waters" | September 13, 2018 | - |
The Mighty Nein spend some time in the tavern. They meet a captain who may offer them passage, and a grizzled old tortle named Orly. They learn of a network of waterways under the city called the Sluice Weave. Navigating the waterways, they encounter an elemental Algar has bound to the location. The party battle Algar and his men, and Fjord severs Algar's left hand to separate him from the device controlling the elemental.
| 35 | "Dockside Diplomacy" | September 21, 2018 | Ashley Johnson is absent this episode |
The Mighty Nein coerce Algar to leave the city for good. They go to the docks that night to meet with Marius. A failed attempt at eavesdropping on a conversation between him and the crew of The Mist results in a violent confrontation. The guards become involved and the party is drawn into a running battle as they retreat onto The Mist. Caleb hurls a Fireball at the shore as they escape. The Mighty Nein kill most of the crew in the fight, though Marius and the ship's carpenter Gallan survive.
| 36 | "O Captain, Who's Captain?" | September 27, 2018 | Ashley Johnson is absent this episode |
The party sail The Mist back to Nicodranas the following day, having prepared false papers and disguises so they may resupply and hire additional crew. Fjord takes on the alias Captain Tusktooth and the boat is renamed The Mistake. They take on the tortle Orly as a navigator, and led by visions Fjord has received, sail for the island Urukayxl. Before they arrive, they are intercepted by a much larger vessel.
| 37 | "Dangerous Liaisons" | October 4, 2018 | Live show was broadcast from the United Palace Theater. Technical difficulties delayed availability of the VOD. |
After standing down, the Mighty Nein is taken aboard the Squall-Eater and are forced to serve under Captain Avantika. Fjord discovers she is also connected to his patron Uk'otoa and that their interests may align. A subordinate of Avantika, Jamedi Cosko, returns to the ship with information about Urukayxl. As Fjord had suspected, it is likely to be the resting place of another of the Cloven Crystals and perhaps a temple to Uk'otoa. Avantika joins the group and they head to shore.
| 38 | "Welcome to the Jungle" | October 11, 2018 | Ashley Johnson is absent for a block of episodes and her character is portrayed by Mercer. Johnson returns in Episode 46. |
The group avoid lizardmen and yuan-ti as they head into a dense jungle. They infiltrate a village at the base of the temple but are discovered and a battle ensues. The party race up the slope of the pyramidal temple, climb into a hatch, and bar it behind them. The party trigger a trap and a staircase turns into a slide that deposits them into a chamber filled with more yuan-ti.
| 39 | "Temple of the False Serpent" | October 18, 2018 | - |
The group kill the yuan-ti, and navigate a series of puzzles and traps in the temple. They discover a strange orchard in a deeper chamber, one that may be fed with sacrificial blood. They are attacked by vines, a group of yuan-ti abominations, and finally a hydra.
| 40 | "Dubious Pursuits" | November 1, 2018 | Laura Bailey is absent this episode. |
Avantika and Fjord race into a submerged chamber, attempting to break the seal on Uk'otoa. Avantika reaches it first and receives a boon from her patron. The water level rises and the temple begins to collapse so the party flee up through the structure. They are attacked in a flooded chamber by more yuan-ti, and the delay causes Jester and Caduceus to begin to drown. Fjord kisses Jester and forces air into her lungs before they swim on. Caduceus is dragged to the surface by his companions. They are pursued by the locals as they escape the temple and run for hours through the jungle to reach the shore. The Squall-Eater provides covering fire for their retreat. The group, short on supplies, begin sailing for the pirate-ruled island Darktow. Fjord and Avantika share stories of their pasts and realize they were both involved with Fjord's former captain Vandran, who was seemingly connected to Uk'otoa. Fjord theorizes the Tide's Breath, a shipwreck he was involved in, may be the resting place of the third and final Cloven Crystal. Fjord and Avantika spend the night together.
| 41 | "A Pirate's Life for Me" | November 8, 2018 | - |
Avantika and the Mighty Nein encounter a Clovis Concord ship and threaten the crew into submission. They loot the ship, and Jester tattoos one of the crew members with an image of a googly-eyed Captain Tusktooth. A brief scuffle with a guard yields a box of magic paints. Squall-Eater and The Mistake arrive at Darktow. They meet with the Plank King, ruler of the island and in some respects all piracy in the eastern Lucidean Ocean. Avantika pays tribute but the King whispers to Beau there will be a significant reward if she brings him information of any underhand dealings by Avantika.
| 42 | "A Hole in the Plan" | November 15, 2018 | - |
At night, the Mighty Nein break into Squall-Eater and retrieve Avantika's encrypted journal. Caleb breaks the cipher and writes a key so anyone may read it, given enough time. They learn Avantika is planning to usurp the Plank King as ruler of Darktow. Squall-Eater's crew notice the disturbance, and in the morning, they gather on the deck. When it becomes apparent Avantika has tracked the journal with magic, Caleb casts Wall of Fire in a line across the deck.
| 43 | "In Hot Water" | November 29, 2018 | - |
The ship erupts into messy combat, in which Avantika's first mate Vera uses Mass Suggestion to draw in the guards from the docks. Jester and Beau grab the journal and teleport into the middle of the city, and begin sprinting to the hall of the Plank King. To provide a distraction, Fjord summons a demon on the ship's deck. Caleb kills most of the crew along with Vera using a Fireball, and then all sides stand down to await the Plank King's judgment. The King is persuaded by the contents of the journal and immediately executes Avantika. The Mighty Nein have also broken his law so they are banished from Darktow. They are given the fire-damaged Squall-Eater and quickly flee, making repairs as they go. They sail to the location of Fjord's shipwreck and dive to the bottom under the effect of an Underwater Breathing spell.
| 44 | "The Diver's Grave" | December 6, 2018 | - |
The Mighty Nein dive to find the wreck of Tide's Breath. They enter the lair of Dashilla the Dreadful and are faced with the spirits of dead sailors. Dashilla flees during combat, and while the party recover the third Cloven Crystal, a storm suddenly appears on the surface. The ship successfully flees from the storm.
| 45 | "The Stowaway" | December 13, 2018 | Guest stars Deborah Ann Woll. |
The Mighty Nein rename Squall-Eater to Ball Eater. They sail to Bisaft Isle to have the ship repaired, and find a stowaway who had been aboard since Darktow. A small gnome named Twiggy makes friends with the party and reveals a bizarre, clockwork, magical sphere in her possession. The party experiment and discover it contains an extra-dimensional dungeon that was constructed before the Calamity. They examine a library within and accidentally tumble into the lair of a blue dragon. The Mighty Nein arrive in the chamber at different times through a magical window, the fight quickly becomes dangerous, and they are forced to retreat. They re-emerge on their ship and discover they have been missing for six days. Twiggy leaves the magic item, the "happy fun ball", in their care.
| 46 | "A Storm of Memories" | December 20, 2018 | Ashley Johnson returns for a single episode. |
The Mighty Nein settle their debts and reunite with Yasha before setting sail. Caleb examines the items recovered from the "happy fun ball", including several books. Yasha has an encounter with the Storm Lord and faces a figure made of lightning on the deck. The party arrive in the Gravid Archipelago and Caleb locates a submerged tower that is guarded by sea spawn. They dive and engage the creatures.

=== 2019 ===
List of episodes in 2019
| Episode | Title | Original release date | Notes |
|---|---|---|---|
| 47 | "The Second Seal" | January 10, 2019 | Ashley Johnson is absent for a block of episodes and her character is portrayed by Mercer. Johnson returns in Episode 58. |
The party fight their way through several chuul, large lobster-like aberrations. Fjord discusses his plans with the party; he intends to break this seal to achieve power but suspecting Uk'otoa is dangerous, he refuses to unlock the final seal, which will release Uk'otoa into the world. After everyone leaves the room, he gives up his Cloven Crystal and the party escape. A second ship, which is clearly intent on attacking, approaches. Caduceus uses magic to capsize it from a distance. They rescue the crew, Jester gives one of their number a Tusktooth tattoo, and they sail back to Nicodranas.
| 48 | "Homeward Bound" | January 17, 2019 | - |
The group make an appointment at Tidepeak Tower in Nicodranas. The tower's owner, the mage Yussa Errenis, discusses recent events in the war with Beau. Caduceus has Yussa examine the "happy fun ball" and the dodecahedron. Yussa deduces the ball is extremely dangerous and offers to trade it for access to his teleportation sigil. The group learn Xhorhas has recently attacked Nott's home town Felderwin and decide to check on it. On their way into town, Caleb recognizes the Archmage of Domestic Protection, Martinet Ludinus Da'leth, and the Archmage of Antiquity, Vess DeRogna, who are with Righteous Brand soldiers. Nott leads the investigation of the burned-down Brenatto Apothecary and finds Yeza the owner is missing but his son Luc has survived the Xhorhasian attack. Breaking into the basement, they discover notes on a previously-unknown branch of magic called dunamancy and that the Cerberus Assembly used Yeza to conduct experiments. It is revealed Nott is Luc's mother.
| 49 | "A Game of Names" | January 24, 2019 | - |
The party must quickly move to a safe location to avoid detection from the Archmages. Nott reveals herself as a halfling named Veth who was once married to Yeza. Her family was kidnapped by goblins and escaped but were separated. Veth killed a goblin leader before being re-captured, and the goblins drowned her and forced a witch to turn her into Nott. Caleb confesses his name was Bren Aldric Ermendrud and reveals his past to the party. He reveals scars from the experiments Ikithon performed on him and said he has been on the run for a long time. Caduceus, via Divination, discovers Yeza is being taken to Ghor Dranas, the capital of the Kryn Dynasty in Xhorhas. The group hire an escort for Luc and his guardian to take them to Alfield while they travel to Xhorhas.
| 50 | "The Endless Burrows" | January 31, 2019 | Guest stars Chris Perkins. |
The Mighty Nein reopen the tunnels used by the Kryn Dynasty to attack Felderwin. They follow the tunnels to avoid crossing the Ashkeeper Peaks, and along the way meet a dim-witted kobold inventor named Spurt. Spurt is killed almost as soon as he joins the party. Using cunning and distraction, the party cross a bridge over lava that is being guarded by fire giants and escape further into the tunnel system.
| 51 | "Xhorhas" | February 14, 2019 | Last episode aired on the Legendary Digital Networks Alpha service, and on the Geek & Sundry Twitch and YouTube channels. |
The group have stealthily crossed the border into Xhorhas, avoiding the frontlines of the war, and they emerge on the eastern side of the Ashkeeper Peaks. They are caught in a skirmish between Empire scouts and Kyrn soldiers. The Kryn soldiers use incredibly powerful dunamantic magic. Both sides take heavy losses before the Kryn withdraw. The party recover and head towards Asarius, the City of Beasts.
| 52 | "Feral Business" | February 21, 2019 | First episode available only through the Critical Role Twitch and YouTube channels. |
The Mighty Nein enter Asarius and agree to take care of a problem for a beast owner in exchange for a discount on his moorbounders—large, panther-like creatures that are used as mounts. The group fight demons and seal a strange rift to the Abyss, the demonic plane. They then meet with a den mother named Lady Zethris Olios to take on mercenary work. She gives them a choice of two possible jobs; bring her the Empire spy who is working near the Four Corners or find out why several locals have recently gone mad and committed murders, which she suspects is demonic. In exchange, she offers 10,000 gold pieces or a favor to the Bright Queen.
| 53 | "Cornered" | February 28, 2019 | First episode where during live broadcast, D&D Beyond Twitch overlay is available when viewed in a web browser. |
After a punishing dream from Uk'otoa, Fjord discusses with Caduceus how this dream is different due to Uk'otoa's anger. He learns more about Caduceus's connection with Melora, the Wildmother. The party decide to pursue Lady Olios's jobs before continuing after Yeza. Beau and Jester participate in a pit fight with a mysterious female drow and others at the Four Corners tavern. After winning the fight, the drow approaches Beau and leads her, Caleb, and Jester to a deserted storage shack. The drow then drops its disguise, revealing itself to be Beau's mentor Dairon of the Cobalt Soul.
| 54 | "Well Beneath" | March 7, 2019 | - |
Dairon reveals she is in Asarius investigating a possible connection between the Assembly and the Kryn Dynasty. Dairon exchanges information with the group and Beau warns her Lady Olios is looking for a spy. The party investigate a haunted well and divert attention from themselves. The next evening, they follow up with a bugbear who lives near the well and fight two fiends in his home. The fiends retreat to the tunnels beneath the well and the group give chase.
| 55 | "Duplicity" | March 14, 2019 | - |
The party engage in a brutal fight with fiends including an incubus and a succubus, which use devastating charm abilities against them. A large fiendish creature known as a minotaur-armanite enters the fight via an abyssal rift. The group defeat the fiends but Caduceus dies. Jester raises him with the help of the Traveler and the Wildmother using the Revivify spell. They close the rift and find the device that was used to punch holes between the Abyss and the Prime Material Plane.
| 56 | "The Favor" | March 21, 2019 | Taliesin Jaffe is absent. |
The party return to Lady Olios and show her their evidence of the abyssal rift, which is verified by a male drow wizard Lythir VaSuun, who breaks the device. As their reward, the group are granted an audience with Leylas Kryn, the Bright Queen. Lady Olios teleports VaSuun and the group to Rosohna, the capital. Lady Olios speaks with the Bright Queen before they are taken into her throne room. During the audience, VaSuun, who was in skirmish on the Ashkeeper Peaks, accuses the party of espionage. In a last-ditch effort to save their lives, Caleb pulls out the dodecahedron the party acquired in Zadash. The Mighty Nein are declared heroes for returning one of the Beacons of the Luxon.
| 57 | "In Love and War" | April 4, 2019 | - |
The Bright Queen takes the beacon from the party and reveals its nature. The beacon is a key component in a cycle of reincarnation among her people. The Mighty Nein are granted symbols of the dynasty, and are allowed to meet Yeza in prison. Nott is troubled about being seen by her husband in her goblin form but Yeza accepts her. The party are granted rooms in the Dim's Inn and discuss future plans.
| 58 | "Wood and Steel" | April 11, 2019 | Ashley Johnson returns. |
The party split into two groups to complete some errands; Fjord, Nott, Jester, Yasha and Cadeuceus seek a blacksmith to examine a broken sword Cadeuceus purchased in Zadash; while Beau and Caleb organize work for the party. Kryn weapons engineer Tuss Waccoh requests they clear a mining camp of giants, specifies the foreman Bodo must not get the credit for it, and offers a bonus if they can embarrass him in some way. The group reunite and head to the work camp, where Bodo offers to beat Waccoh's reward by 25% after being intimidated. The party scout for the giants.
| 59 | "Perspective" | April 18, 2019 | - |
A fight breaks out but the party make use of Charm Monster to stop the violence. The giants tell them a story about them being forced out of their original home by creatures that turned some of the giants undead. The party rest overnight and ride for the mountains. They encounter chasme—strange, extremely dangerous, insectoid demons. Jester and Fjord narrowly avoid death and are able to seal a portal to the abyss but a giant is possessed at the last moment.
| 60 | "A Turtle By Any Other Name" | April 25, 2019 | - |
Yasha slays the giant but the dybbuk possessing it escapes through use of Dimension Door. They encounter a second rift upstairs and a chasme flies out to attack them. A possessed giant is polymorphed into a snapping turtle which is still remarkably dangerous so Caleb is forced to polymorph it again into a less-dangerous turtle which is tossed into the rift. Another giant is possessed but the party is able to destroy the anchor and seal the rift. Beau locates a small piece of blue fabric, which she suspects is a clue to discovering who is creating these rifts. Yasha has a vision of the Storm Lord and sees herself in shackles.
| 61 | "Agreements" | May 2, 2019 | - |
Jester attempts to scry using the blue fabric and sees a blond man in the midst of conversation, and discerns a few pieces of key information about a meeting at "Overcrow", though not his identity. Yasha explains her past as an exile from her people. The party tell the giants it is safe to return home and ridicule Bodo in front of his men with a love letter written by him. Fjord has an issue with his powers disappearing due to his neglect of Uk'otoa's wishes and his refusal to place the final Cloven Crystal in its temple. The party do some shopping and discover they have been allocated a house as a reward for their actions.
| 62 | "Domestic Respite" | May 9, 2019 | - |
The Mighty Nein explore their new lodgings "The Xhorhaus" and organize some security, a hot tub, and an alchemical laboratory. Essek, their liaison with the Kryn Dynasty, visits and teaches Caleb two dunamancy spells. The party investigate the Overcrow Apothecary, and Jester again attempts to scry on the blond man and learns of an impending attack on the Ashguard Garrison.
| 63 | "Intervention" | May 16, 2019 | - |
The Mighty Nein take the information from their scrying attempts to the Bright Queen and warn of the coming attack. The queen asks them to act on this information and intercept this oncoming meeting at the Overcrow Apothecary. They observe the building and a drow who approaches. A fight breaks out but a drow named Obann escapes, and the group are encouraged via a message to pursue him north.
| 64 | "A Dangerous Chase" | May 23, 2019 | - |
The party question Mauro, the apothecary's owner. They head north into the Barbed Fields and are attacked by several twisted creatures. The Lost of the Sorrowsworn are extremely resistant to damage when in dim light or darkness so Caleb casts Daylight over their surroundings, which turns the tide. The party spend the night under the protective dome of the spell Leomund's Tiny Hut.
| 65 | "Chases and Trees" | May 30, 2019 | - |
The Mighty Nein discover a map of the region inside the remains of a giant tortoise shell, and travel to a giant tree in the distance. They are stalked by three shadow-touched flying monsters known as gloomstalkers and try unsuccessfully to outrun them. The party then engages and kills them. As the party continues on, another group of gloomstalkers gives chase but four are drawn into a fight with a summoned demon and the fifth is driven off. They reach the tree and camp, and Caduceus communes with the Wildmother. Fjord is again confronted in a vision by Uk'otoa but is offered a degree of sanctuary by the Wildmother. They climb the tree and disturb a massive roc.
| 66 | "Beneath Bazzoxan" | June 6, 2019 | - |
The party use Feather Fall to jump out of the tree and Jester turns the roc into a bat with Polymorph. They examine the treasure they recovered from the nest, which includes a trapped box containing a ring of protection. Jester hides Nott's flask, which results in a later panic because she is dependent on its endless supply of liquor. They go to the outpost of Bazzoxan and magically contact Obann, who tasks them with traveling into the depths of the mountain, where they discover a chamber filled with statues of weeping angels.
| 67 | "Beyond the Eyes of Angels" | June 13, 2019 | - |
Jester retrieves a skull from the chamber after debating whether doing so is disrespectful. The party is attacked by a group of spiders and pass through several trapped rooms, including an ancient torture chamber. They face a horde of undead, who are part of an elaborate puzzle that involves pushing their hearts into a pedestal. The group reluctantly camp and are disturbed by a strange presence that lies at the bottom of a chasm.
| 68 | "Reflections" | June 20, 2019 | Laura Bailey is absent this episode. |
The Mighty Nein use a bridge to cross the chasm are tied together with rope in a long line. A roper attacks the party from above but Jester banishes it. Caduceus casts Speak with Dead on the skull Jester retrieved, and learns the skull's owner sacrificed themself to contain an entity known as "The Laughing Hand". The party encounter a strange set of mirrored hallways that discharge twisted versions of the party. Some of the party is trapped within a strange mirror realm for a time. They complete a musical puzzle and reveal an exit.
| 69 | "The King's Cage" | June 27, 2019 | - |
During a short rest, Jester reveals she has the flask and begins a conversation about Nott's alcoholism. Obann approaches and greets Yasha, whom he refers to as the Orphanmaker, and shows his true form as a demon. Obann seems to be connected to Yasha's past in some way but Yasha has suppressed the memory. Obann starts reading an incantation from a stone tablet and a fight ensues. The party cannot stop Obann from completing the ritual, which opens a sarcophagus in the chamber and releases the Laughing Hand. Each time the party wound it, the Laughing Hand creates another mouth on the surface of the creature, adding to the cacophonous laughter emerging from it. Obann is slain but some magical effect causes Yasha to turn on the party. The Mighty Nein are forced to flee, leaving Yasha behind and sealing her into the chamber with the Laughing Hand. The party leave, devastated at their loss.
| 70 | "Causatum" | July 11, 2019 | Ashley Johnson is absent for a block of episodes. Johnson returns in Episode 86. |
The Mighty Nein return to Bazzoxan and debate their next actions. Jester tells the Bright Queen of the release of the Laughing Hand and scries on Yasha. They discover Obann has been resurrected. They return to the Bright Queen at the Lucid Bastion and divulge their information on the Laughing Hand. Caduceus suggests searching for "the Kiln", a temple to the Wildmother, because he believes it could forge a weapon capable of fighting the Laughing Hand. Caleb confronts an Empire assassin who is locked in the dungeon and asks Essek delay their execution so they can further interrogate the assassin at a later date. Caduceus explains more about the Kiln and the broken sword Dwueth'var, the Star Razor.
| 71 | "Family Gathering" | July 18, 2019 | - |
Beau meets with Dairon at the Xhorhaus, and learns there are traitors within both the Empire and Xhorhas, and that the Empire is in possession of another stolen beacon. They surmise someone within the Kryn Dynasty had given the beacons to the Empire and that they are intent on keeping the war going. After a discussion with the rest of the party, Dairon assumes a disguise as a housekeeper for the Xhorhaus. They teleport to Nicodranas, reunite Nott and Yeza with their son Luc, and speak with Yussa at the Tidepeak Tower. Nott discusses with Caleb the difficult issue of returning to her halfling form; a process that may involve necromancy. Leaving her family in Nicodranas with a generous stipend, Nott returns to Xhorhas with the rest of the party. From there, Essek takes them to the Kravaraad volcano, home of the Kiln.
| 72 | "Clay and Dust" | July 25, 2019 | - |
Essek leaves the party at the volcano and returns to Rosohna, while Jester and Caleb Polymorph into eagles to search for an entrance to the volcano. They find one and meet a dwarf named Jeramess Dust, a distant associate of Caduceus who knows his family. Caduceus communes with the Wildmother and learns they need to locate a blacksmith in Uthodurn to reforge the blade. Jester and Fjord contact Vandran via Sending. Uk'otoa once again revokes Fjord's powers to coerce him to release the final seal. When Fjord's attempts at intimidation by threatening suicide fail, he hurls the sword into the lava, forcibly breaking the pact. He drops his false accent, and reveals to the party his loss of powers and his concerns about being useless to them. The rest of the Mighty Nein support him regardless of his loss.
| 73 | "Uthodurn" | August 2, 2019 | Live show was broadcast from the Murat Theatre in Indianapolis. |
The party begin the hike to Uthodurn. Wolves and two remorhaz, huge insectoid monstrosities, attack them. The party win the fight but they take some injuries and are forced to camp as dusk falls. The next day, Beau and Nott climb a tree to get a vantage of the path ahead, and become increasingly competitive to the point Nott shoots Beau with a pistol. The group are pursued by wolves but arrive at the perimeter of Uthodurn in time to be saved by the guards. They visit the Broken Stool Tavern for room and board, contact Essek, and rest. At the Anvil of Smeltborne, they meet the craftsman Umagorn but indicate he will need iceflex—a material created by a white dragon breathing on mythril—to fix it.
| 74 | "Manifold Morals" | August 8, 2019 | Guest stars Mica Burton. |
The Mighty Nein meet the aasimar Reani and are invited into her house for tea. She accompanies them into town, starting with the Plexus Post, where they buy knick-knacks made of mythril. Ava, the owner of the Plexus Post, asks them to retrieve a magic ring that was stolen from her by the Tumblecarves, a noble family with criminal ties. The party go to the Vellum Steeple Archive, where they research into various fields. Nott shoots Caleb as a distraction to allow Jester to rip out and pocket a critical page, and the group are kicked out. Their mythril is melted down into an ingot at the forge, and they gain access to the teleportation circle at the Archive by giving them money and an apology. The party return to Rosohna and speak with Essek, who transports them to Mythburrow, where a white dragon is believed to reside.
| 75 | "Rime and Reason" | August 15, 2019 | Guest stars Mica Burton. |
Essek returns to Rosohna, leaving the party just outside the cave of Mythburrow, which is home to an ancient white dragon named Gelidon, the Nightmare in Ivory. They attack some yetis who are wandering the snow, and kill four of them before retreating and camping for the night. Outside the dome, Caduceus and Fjord discuss their beliefs. Carefully proceeding into the cave the following morning, they tie the mythril ingot to a shield on the end of a piece of rope. Reani has summoned a spider to sit on the shield and ingot, while Jester lures the dragon forward with Thaumaturgy. The dragon breathes on the ingot and converts it to iceflex but carries it off and the party is forced to cut the ropes. They create a diversion while Nott and Jester use Dimension Door to retrieve the fragment and flee back to their dome. The dragon attempts to attack them but it cannot enter the dome and the party escape via Teleportation Circle.
| 76 | "Refjorged" | August 22, 2019 | Guest stars Mica Burton. |
Safely back in Uthodurn, the Mighty Nein go to the Tumbled Tankards to relax with some bar games. They give Umagorn the iceflex and are told they must return to Cinderrest Sanctum in Kravaraad to reforge the blade. The party decide to break into the Tumblecarve house and return Ava's ring. Reani, Jester and Caleb scout it in bat form but are distracted by the promise of bread. They burgle the estate the following morning using Jester's magical paints. Fleeing back to Reani's house, they return the ring to Ava in exchange for some residuum. At Cinderrest Sanctum, Cadeuceus discovers the residuum can be transformed into crystals that could save his home. The party relax and Caleb has a discussion with Nott about her alcohol problem. Fjord goes out alone to commune with the Wildmother and is encased in a cocoon of seaweed while Umagorn reforges the blade. The party pull free Fjord, who discovers his magic powers have returned, with some changes.
| 77 | "A Tangled Web" | September 5, 2019 | - |
Fjord bonds with the new sword and the party journey with Essek to the dungeon with the captive assassin. During a close conversation, the prisoner stabs Caleb and she is quickly executed by the guards. After healing Caleb, the group retreat and have some downtime, including shopping. Dairon promotes Beau to the rank of Expositor, and Beau is tasked with discovering corruption among Cerberus Assembly members. Dairon is able to identify the assassin when Jester disguises herself as the late prisoner. The Mighty Nein return to Nicodranas via Yussa's tower and Jester scries on Yasha.
| 78 | "Between the Lines" | September 19, 2019 | - |
The party return to the Empire via the Wuyun Gorge, and are forced to use magic to charm the guards into letting them pass. They visit Trostenwald and Alfield again, before stopping at Zadash. At the Valley Archive, they research Obann, the Laughing Hand, and the mysterious "Angel of Irons"—a cult that Obann leads. They believe Obann is trying to resurrect Jourrael, the Inevitable End, an assassin from the Calamity. Caleb investigates time manipulation and learns more of the dangers associated with it. They gain access to the Zadash Archive's teleportation circles but are then banned after attempting to abuse this by rotating through the archives of the other cities to memorize additional circles. They eventually return to Rosohna.
| 79 | "Through the Trees" | September 26, 2019 | - |
The Might Nein meet with Essek and teleport into the Lotusden Greenwood in an attempt to intercept Obann's party before they reach the Wraithroot Tree, which contains the heart of Jourrael. An unlucky scouting trip nearly gives away their group and they hide in the forest while Obann and Yasha search for them. They follow at a distance but Nott is seen and a fight ensues. It goes poorly; Obann and Yasha escape with Jourrael's heart and the party is left too weakened to take on the nigh-invincible Laughing Hand. They are forced to retreat back to Rosohna via teleportation.
| 80 | "The Folding Halls" | October 10, 2019 | - |
At the Xhorhaus, the Mighty Nein discuss their need for allies. Dairon arrives and they speak with Essek about the current threat. The party return to Yussa's tower in Nicodranas but find Yussa has been missing for weeks. They speak with Allura Vysoren, a sorcerer from Tal'Dorei who tells them more about the "happy fun ball". Allura knows it as the Folding Halls of Halas, an extra-dimensional space created by a powerful wizard from antiquity. The party determine a chamber within the ball may contain the heart of the Laughing Hand and that Yussa may also be trapped within. They enter it once more and face a Froghemoth, return the study from their first journey, and encounter a large golem.
| 81 | "From Door to Door" | October 17, 2019 | - |
Within the ball, the party explore a chamber containing a clockwork tower. Caduceus uses Command to disable the golem but it later pursues them to the armory. Eventually, Nott kills it with a ballista. They discover a few magical items, and use a magic mirror to contact Allura and learn more about the events in the war. From the Mighty Nein's perspective, time is moving more quickly outside the ball. They use the workshop to construct a golem of their own named Little Willi, and discover a laboratory containing twisted monsters.
| 82 | "The Beat of the Permaheart" | October 24, 2019 | - |
The Mighty Nein slay the failed experimental monster. They discover the ball's creator Halas had been experimenting with the construction of replacement bodies in lieu of immortality. They locate and destroy the heart of the Laughing Hand. Jester scries on the Laughing Hand and learns it has been weakened. Pushing onward, they explore a chamber containing an Astral Dreadnought that has been chained up.
| 83 | "Dark Bargains" | October 31, 2019 | - |
In the interior of the Astral Dreadnought, they uncover a laboratory of Halas that contains the soul of an ancient wizard trapped in a ruby. They converse with the wizard, informing him of the many centuries that have passed and contact Allura because they are unsure whether to release him. Continuing to explore the chambers outside, they encounter an insane horned devil and a magical trap that instantly kills Nott. Jester revives her and their group rescue Yussa from his prison. Yussa returns to his tower while Allura performs a ritual to learn more about the Angel of Irons. They discover the Angel of Irons is a cult of Tharizdûn, the Chained Oblivion, a god of madness that will reduce the world to nothingness.
| 84 | "Titles and Tattoos" | November 7, 2019 | - |
Yussa, Allura, and the party discuss the cult of the Angel of Irons, and Yussa reimburses them for his rescue. They are given a contact in the Zadash to ask more about it, and Jester, Beau, and Nott receive magical tattoos from Orly. The Cobalt Soul forgives the group for their earlier transgressions, performs some research, and talks with Yussa's contact. They discuss a theory the war may be a diversion orchestrated by the cult to allow them to free the Chained Oblivion. At the Invulnerable Vagrant, Jourrael attacks Caduceus.
| 85 | "The Threads Converge" | November 14, 2019 | - |
Pumat Sol and the Mighty Nein fight Jourrael, who is forced to retreat. The party meet with The Gentleman, who admits he is Jester's father. Jester learns a little more of her father's past and why he was absent during her childhood. Pumat scries on Yasha as she approaches the gates of Rexxentrum, and the group teleport there. They arrive as the city comes under attack from the Kryn Dynasty. The party intervene as they head to the Chantry of Dawn to intercept Yasha's group.
| 86 | "The Cathedral" | November 21, 2019 | Ashley Johnson returns. |
The group rush to the cathedral, bluff their way past an attacking Kryn force, and enter the building by means of Jester's magical paints. Caleb smashes his way through the stained glass window and a fight with the cult ensues, in which the debilitated Laughing Hand is slain and Yasha is freed. Obann retreats and the Nein pursue with Pumat holding off the cultists behind them. They fight in the Fane room, which contains an artefact known as the Shackle, which keeps Tharizdûn bound and unable to affect the Prime Material Plane. At the moment of his defeat, Obann is cursed by Tharizdûn and transformed into a grotesque monster.
| 87 | "Punishment and Politics" | December 5, 2019 | - |
The party battle against Obann the Punished, who is killed by his own assassin Jourrael's blow. The party learn Pumat is alive but severely injured, and speak with the Righteous Brand investigators to explain what happened. The party talk with Yasha and are swiftly escorted to the throne room to explain their findings to King Bertrand Dwendal. Beau explains and suggests the Mighty Nein could act as mediators, and help to end the conflict between the Empire and the Dynasty.
| 88 | "Unwanted Reunions" | December 12, 2019 | - |
The party retreat to their lodgings to discuss the day's events and the king's offer. The following day, they are escorted by Ludinus Da'leth to see the beacon at their request. Ikithon informs them it was recovered in an archaeological dig in Pride's Call, though Caduceus doubts him. The party conclude the Empire intends to return the stolen beacon to make peace with Xhorhas but continue their research with the newly-discovered beacon. They spend some time in Rexxentrum and shop at the Cryptic Collection.
| 89 | "Lingering Wounds" | December 19, 2019 | - |
The Mighty Nein have some downtime in Rexxentrum and all but Caleb attend The King's Cut, a clandestine fighting pit under a butcher's shop. Caleb meets with Astrid, a woman he loved while at the Soltryce Academy, who is now an assassin. The following morning, the entire party go to the fighting pit. Beau easily defeats her combatant Ovo, Fjord is knocked out by a man named Darrow, and Yasha throws her fight against Kal Dimmins, allowing herself to be severely beaten as a form of "physical therapy".

=== 2020 ===
List of episodes in 2020
| Episode | Title | Original release date | Notes |
|---|---|---|---|
| 90 | "Bathhouses and Bastions" | January 9, 2020 | - |
The party do some research and pick up their goods from the Cryptic Collection. They visit the Xhorhaus and contact Essek, and update him on the death of Obann and the events of the past few days. They converse with the Bright Queen and after a tense moment, organize an international meeting at sea and a continuation of the ceasefire.
| 91 | "Stone to Clay" | January 16, 2020 | - |
Essek joins the Mighty Nein for dinner at the Xhorhaus, and Caduceus shares some of his family mythology. Jester purchases some materials for Traveler Con, an upcoming event celebrating her god. Caleb and Essek develop a transmogrification spell that could return Nott to her true form. Nott is hesitant but eventually agrees to the process but the spell fails because there is still a curse upon her.
| 92 | "Home Is Where the Heart Is" | January 23, 2020 | - |
Nott shares more details about her past and the old woman who turned her into a goblin, and Beau connects this to an old fortune teller who dealt with her father. Beau believed the story of her family's prosperity to be a fiction but now believes it might be true. Their research leads them to discover her name, Isharnai. In Kamordah, Beau has an awkward reunion with her family but learns more about the hag who cursed Nott.
| 93 | "Misery Loves Company" | January 30, 2020 | - |
Jester communes with the Traveler to determine if they need to kill the hag Isharnai but the Traveler indicates there are other means of lifting the curse. Three of the party's horses are killed by acid geysers as they advance towards Isharnai's hut. The Mighty Nein take it in turns to enter the hut and talk with Isharnai. Fjord, Nott, Yasha, and Jester enter and learn Isharnai feeds on suffering. She offers deals to the party involving sacrifices in exchange for lifting Nott's curse. Jester out-wits the hag by offering her a cupcake infused with the magical item called the "Dust of Deliciousness" and then modifying the hag's memory. Isharnai believes she had just agreed to end the curse because she had such a nice time talking with Jester, and follows through. The party leave quickly, concerned that she may work out their ruse.
| 94 | "With Great Power..." | February 6, 2020 | - |
Jester explains what happened while they flee. Unable to escape with teleportation that day, they decide to spend the night in the forest but are attacked by husk zombies. Caleb completes the ritual for Leomund's Tiny Hut and the group rest. They return to the Xhorhaus for a short time and Essek teleports them to Whitedawn Lagoon, where they might continue Caduceus' journey to find his distant relatives. During the night, the Traveler reveals himself to Jester as the archfey Artagan. He is not truly a god but a fraud who needs her help.
| 95 | "Blessing in Disguise" | February 13, 2020 | - |
Jester introduces Artagan to the party in person. Artagan shares his difficulties; he initially enjoyed posing as a god but quickly grew tired of dealing with demanding followers. The group debate what should happen to the religion around him and Jester suggests using Traveler Con to deal with the followers, perhaps to disband them. As they continuing their journey, the party is attacked by Bladerakes but defeat the creatures and find a pool of water ringed by strange statues. Upon closer examination, the statues appear to include the petrified bodies of Caduceus' family. A gorgon approaches the Mighty Nein.
| 96 | "Family Shatters" | February 20, 2020 | - |
The party fight the gorgon, Fjord narrowly avoids death, and Beau escapes petrification. Caduceus frees several of his family members using Greater Restoration and has a strange reunion with them. Eremis Stone, when restored, informs the party the gorgon came from Blightshore. Caduceus places the crystals he forged in Kravaraad into the waters of the lagoon and they transform. He entrusts them to his sister Calliope because the crystals will save their home from destruction. The party camp for the night and free the remaining petrification victims in the morning. They and the Clay family teleport to Uthodurn, where Jester arranges for Reani to escort the Clays back home. The party then go to Nicodranas to prepare for the upcoming peace negotiations.
| 97 | "The Fancy and the Fooled" | February 27, 2020 | Live show was broadcast from the Auditorium Theatre during C2E2. |
The Mighty Nein are invited to a party in Nicodranas by Athesius and Thain of the Cerberus Assembly. Caleb spies using his cat Frumpkin and determines Thain is a guise of Essek. At the Lavish Chateau, the party make a second attempt to transmogrify Nott. Because the curse has been lifted, the spell takes hold and Nott returns to her halfling form, Veth. Marion's bathtub is completely destroyed in the ritual. The Mighty Nein organize outfits and attend a party, where they confront Essek, who admits he gave the beacons to the Empire because he was convinced the beacons could yield greater secrets of dunamancy, but their religious significance meant this would go unexplored. Essek now regrets his actions because they led to war. Caleb recognizes similarities to his own journey and stands by Essek regardless.
| 98 | "Dark Waters" | March 5, 2020 | - |
The party debate further action with their information, potentially bringing corrupt empire officials to justice but Caduceus is concerned it would reignite the war. Jester and Fjord escort Marion, an agoraphobe, back to the Lavish Chateau, and Jester goes to purchase supplies for Traveler Con. Veth talks with Yeza and agrees to continue her adventuring, leaving him a small fortune to live on in the meantime. Boarding Ball Eater, the party join the fleet heading to the peace negotiations. A storm arrives on the third night and minions of Uk'otoa attack, and kill Fjord and Orly. The remainder of the party prevent the creatures escaping with Fjord's body and kill the remainder.
| 99 | "High Seas, High Stakes" | March 12, 2020 | A hiatus due to concerns around the COVID-19 pandemic was announced on March 17, 2020. |
Caduceus and Jester revive Fjord and Orly. Other ships in the fleet have noticed to commotion, and the Mighty Nein are soon explaining themselves to Lady Vess DeRogna of the Cerberus Assembly. The bodies of the creatures that attacked them have changed into those of dead fishermen, depriving them of evidence, but their story is believed. Caduceus uses Greater Restoration to free Fjord of the remaining Cloven Crystal of Uk'otoa he is carrying, and this is hidden with Caleb's Vault of Amber spell. Later, the fleet meets with that of the Dynasty and negotiations begin. The talks are successful, and with the war over, the Mighty Nein set sail for Rumblecusp, the future venue of Traveler Con.
| 100 | "Hunted at Sea" | July 2, 2020 | The show returned in a pre-recorded format with production following social distancing requirements during the pandemic. |
The Mighty Nein journey southwest to the volcanic island Rumblecusp. Along the way, Ball Eater is attacked by a dragon turtle. On making landfall, the party discover the island is inhabited. Heading inland into the jungle to make sure it will be safe to host Traveler Con on Rumblecusp, the party meet a displacer beast and a hunting party. They learn of Vokodo, the deity of the island, and meet a half-elf named Viridian.
| 101 | "Mysteries, Memories, and Music" | July 9, 2020 | - |
The party learn more about the island from Viridian, and spend some time at the village Vo. They learn of the tradition of giving gifts to Vokodo at the mountain, and spend the night in town. Jester communes with the Traveler and learns Vokodo is not a true god, and may be wiping the memories of island residents. In the morning, some of their belongings have been moved around but Frumpkin did not sense any intruders. They travel deeper into the island along with Viridian and are attacked by a Bodak.
| 102 | "Ghosts, Dinosaurs, and Stuff" | July 16, 2020 | - |
The party face the Bodak and its accompanying will-o'-wisps, and then continue deeper into the island. Caduceus communes with the Wildmother and learns the memory-wiping effect of Vokodo can be reversed with magic. They witness more of the strange fauna of Rumblecusp from a distance, seeing a Tyrannosaurus rex eat a draegloth. They stop for the night, and the following morning, they travel through a passage that leads into the mountain. It is submerged in warm water which is oddly breathable. They meet with Vokodo, a bizarre creature who demands gifts from them. Among the treasures they proffer, Fjord leaves behind his sword, knowing he can recall it to his hand at any time. The party's gifts are added to the vast horde of valuables atop Vokodo's back. The party retreat to the surface and camp there. Caduceus uses Greater Restoration to fix Viridian's memory, who reveals her name was once Vilya, and that she has been trapped on the island for twenty-five years.
| 103 | "Maritime Mysteries" | July 23, 2020 | - |
Vilya speaks with the Ashari of her past and her failed Aramenté twenty-five years previously, which left her stranded on Rumblecusp. It seems shards of other planes are intersecting at the island, perhaps due to the influence of Vokodo. Fjord recalls the sword and the volcano begins to increase in activity in the distance. Jester and Beau scout out to sea to see if Vokodo's magical effects decay with distance but if this is the case, the edge is beyond their reach. Jester and Caduceus speak with their divine patrons and Caleb creates a series of illusions to remind everyone of their pasts before they sleep. Investigating the strange reverse waterfall in the morning, they discover a cave filled with old ships that had belonged to island residents. A magic effect draws Caduceus into a submerged tunnel.
| 104 | "The Ruined Sliver" | July 30, 2020 | - |
The party pursue Caduceus and drag him back to the surface. The group explore some of the old ships, and Caduceus uses Divine Intervention to see a vision of Vokodo's flight from the Astral Sea and arrival on Rumblecusp. He broke through the barrier between the planes, causing fragments of the Astral Sea to crash into the Prime Material Plane. The effect also pulled Vilya out of her Aramenté and left her stranded on Rumblecusp. The party leave the hidden cave and are confronted by a series of strange, wraith-like creatures in the ruins. They defeat the creatures and hike back towards Vokodo's lair.
| 105 | "Rumble at Rumblecusp" | August 6, 2020 | - |
Jester contacts the Dragon Turtle in an attempt to lure it to Rumblecusp, and Yasha has a vision in which her wings return. They destroy some of the hidden ships in an attempt to draw out Vokodo, which angers the creature but they need to swim into its lair to fight. Vokodo heats the water around the party to a dangerous temperature, and uses a reflection spell to complicate the fight. Both Beau and Caduceus are briefly banished to the Astral Sea. Caleb strikes at Vokodo with a Disintegrate spell at considerable risk but Vokodo fails to reflect it. Vokodo dies and the party see a vision in which Vokodo flees a sentient city in the Astral Sea. They are left with an image of something called the "Eyes of Nine".
| 106 | "A Fog Lifted" | August 13, 2020 | - |
Despite the scalding water, the party delay their escape to search through Vokodo's lair for treasure and the items they lost earlier to the creature. They reach the cave full of ships and put out the remaining fires. Beau falls prey to a water spout and is hurled high into the air but Yasha uses her newly restored wings to catch Beau. In the village, the locals' memories are restored and there is frustration among them. Some intend to stay while others are making arrangements to leave Rumblecusp. The party meet with the first arrivals for Traveler Con, including a very obnoxious woman named Celia. They divide up the loot and hold a village meeting in which Vilya offers to transport locals to Wildemount and Tal'dorei with magic.
| 107 | "Devoutness and Dicks" | August 27, 2020 | - |
The party organize gifts of gold for the departing villagers so they may rebuild their lives. The party workshop possibilities for Traveler Con with Artagan, and decide to imply Artagan was merely an avatar or emissary of the Moonweaver, and to encourage followers to worship her instead. They design festivities and activities for the event, including a dick-sculpting workshop, a dick hunt, and an event where the dick sculptures are thrown into the volcano at the summit of the island. The Mighty Nein then hunt and slay a Tyrannosaurus rex to provide food for the event. Vilya uses her magic to return home to Zephrah and meets her daughter Keyleth.
| 108 | "Traveler Con" | September 3, 2020 | - |
The Mighty Nein have discussions about what to do after Rumblecusp. Traveler Con takes place the following day, with Jester speaking to a crowd atop a stage and sending them on a dick hunt. After hurling the dick sculptures into the volcano, Artagan reveals himself in an illusory Moonweaver form and begins to speak to the crowd. The event is interrupted by an angelic emissary of the Moonweaver, who is angry at their misuse of the Moonweaver's name. The emissary reveals their ruse and wraps Artagan in chains. Jester grabs Artagan and pleads with the Moonweaver to let him go but is willing to share his punishment. Artagan kicks Jester free to spare her, which convinces the Moonweaver to release him. Over a round of drinks later that night, Artagan apologizes to the group, saying he never intended them to come to harm on his part. The party threaten to kill Artagen if he endangers Jester again. The Traveler followers leave, disillusioned about their former patron. The party discuss a few different courses to take for their next quest and decide to teleport to Nicodranas to investigate the Eyes of Nine.
| 109 | "Frigid Propositions" | September 10, 2020 | - |
The party do some shopping and spend some time at the Lavish Chateau while Veth reunites with her family. Beau has the Cobalt Soul investigate Vokodo and the Eyes of Nine but they are unable to find anything. The Mighty Nein go to Rexxentrum to meet with Cerberus Assembly member Lady Vess DeRogna. She offers them involvement in her expedition to the ruins of Aeor, a pre-Calamity floating city that crashed into the now-frozen archipelago of Eiselcross. DeRogna offers significant pay for the project, which the party accept. On the way out, Caleb receives a letter from his former master Ikithon, inviting him to a reunion over dinner.
| 110 | "Dinner with the Devil" | September 17, 2020 | - |
Caleb tells the Mighty Nein he intends to go to the dinner, despite his conflict with Ikithon, to find out whether Astrid and Eadwulf can be redeemed. Caduceus and Jester create sanctuaries using Word of Recall. Beauregard researches their future expedition in the Rexxentrum Archive while the Nein goes shopping for custom cold-weather gear. Dressing formally, they attend Ikithon's manor in the Shimmer Ward. The dinner is remarkably tense due to Caleb's and Ikithon's history. Ikithon expresses pride in Caleb, further claiming the trauma Caleb went through made him who he is. The party accuse Ikithon of attempting to take credit for Caleb's recent successes and Caduceus directly confronts him. At a dive bar afterwards, Beau theorizes on connections between Vess DeRogna and Mollymauk. The party rent some rooms in Rexxentrum and Caleb casts Magnificent Mansion.
| 111 | "New Homes and Old Friends" | September 24, 2020 | - |
Caleb gives the party a tour of his finely crafted Magnificent Mansion, entitled "Widogast's Nascent Nein-Sided Tower", with rooms for everyone in the party customized to their needs. At the Invulnerable Vagrant, Veth reintroduces herself to Pumat in her new form and the party purchase some magical items. The party meet with The Gentleman and discuss what he knows about his former associate Cree—who knew Mollymauk—the Tombtakers, and the Eyes of Nine. Beauregard has some theories and knows Mollymauk had nine tattoos of eyes and may have been connected to all of this. Jester scries on Cree and sees her walking through snow in a distant land. She speculates Cree is already ahead of them in Eiselcross. After some discussion, the party teleport to Mollymauk's grave and find it empty. Jester attempts to scry on him, and sees Mollymauk is alive and is also walking through snow.
| 112 | "The Chase Begins" | October 15, 2020 | This episode was released after a short hiatus in October. |
Jester tells the party of her vision and speaks with grass using Charm of Plant Command, learning Mollymauk was dug up around fifty days earlier. They speak about the Tombtakers with Vess DeRogna, who she denies knowing anything. Beau and Yasha have an awkward encounter when organizing sleeping arrangements as they try to process their feelings for each other. The Mighty Nein join DeRogna at the docks in Palebank Village, book passage on Midnight Hammer, and set sail into the frozen north. They encounter a shipwreck and salvage some spell scrolls from it, and are later attacked by minions of Uk'otoa, including an undead Avantika.
| 113 | "A Heart Grown Cold" | October 22, 2020 | - |
The fight on the deck continues, and Avantika grabs the Cloven Crystal and flees. The Mighty Nein pursue her, and several of them are Polymorphed into orcas, and they catch Avantika. As Fjord bisects Avantika, his sword glows with additional runes. He recovers the crystal and a few other items, and the party return to their ship. As the journey continues, they meet a small cetus family and otherwise arrive at the small harbor town Balenpost without issue. Their ship flies the colors of the Cerberus Assembly as they begin their final approach.
| 114 | "An Open Window" | October 29, 2020 | - |
The party meet their guide Dagen, and DeRogna says they have forty hours before their departure. They go shopping, and share dinner with DeRogna. As the party go to bed, Jester scries on Mollymauk and sees him searching a room. He seems to be aware he is being watched and states, "To Alpha and Alpha, we trek till homeward bound we be". The group connect this to the archeological sites on their map. When DeRogna does not appear the next morning, the party break into her rooms and discover her dead. They realize this was the room Mollymauk was searching hours earlier. They also find DeRogna had nine tattoos of eyes under her robes, in a manner similar to Mollymauk. Caduceus uses Speak with Dead to interrogate DeRogna, who says she subjected Mollymauk to a ritual that left him with tattoos. She confirms a connection between Aeor and the Eyes of Nine, and that she wishes to claim the Eyes of Nine's power as the Nonagon. Fjord uses an illusion to hide DeRogna's death from her men, and they tell Dagen she has gone on ahead and will meet her at site A5. They pay him his advance and depart.
| 115 | "Fetching Fables & Frosty Friends" | November 5, 2020 | - |
The party camp through the first night without magical shelter and have difficulty sleeping. Fjord sees a scrying orb following Jester, and he and Caleb attempt to mislead their watcher. The following day they uncover an old column embedded with an emerald. The party repeatedly trigger a magical trap on it from increasing distances in an attempt to take the gem through magical means. They fail to take the emerald, and leave and spend the night in the Nein-Sided Tower, not wanting to sleep in the cold again. Caleb reads Jester an old Zemnian story called Der Katzenprinz. The next day, the party are attacked by yetis but manage to negotiate a peaceful resolution, and the yetis provide escorts to site A5, where they speak remotely with Mollymauk and debate joining his expedition before entering the cave.
| 116 | "Under Timeless Ice" | November 12, 2020 | - |
The party find the body of a drow from the Kryn Dynasty in the ruins and investigate a sloping chamber. The Mighty Nein avoid a giant spider and a series of ice creatures attack them. During the confrontation, Veth slips across the sloping floors, plummets into an enormous pit in the next chamber, and is attacked by two black oozes. The party rescue her in a variety of giant eagle forms, discover more Kryn bodies, and encounter Mollymauk—who has just finished killing a group of adventurers.
| 117 | "The Tortoise and The Dare" | November 19, 2020 | - |
Mollymauk, now going by the name Lucien, does not recognize the Mighty Nein. He explains Vess DeRogna subjected him to a ritual to usurp him as the Nonagon, which tore apart his soul and scattered it across the planes of existence. Only a fragment that became Mollymauk remains, who Lucien claims no longer exists. The party witness the Tombtakers remove a large gemstone from the ruins, which Caleb recognizes as a threshold crest, a powerful magical item used to teleport large objects. The Mighty Nein realize although the floating city Aeor crashed during the Calamity, a district called the Cognouza Ward was sent to the Astral Plane, and that Lucien intends to summon it back to Exandria. Lucien poses no immediate threat and encourages the party to give chase. They formulate a plan to race the Tombtakers to excavation site A2 and recover a threshold crest before Lucien can.
| 118 | "Solace Between the Secrets" | December 3, 2020 | - |
The Mighty Nein use Polymorph to gain a lead over the Tombtakers but must contend with difficult weather that slows them. They find a bizarre circle of statues that can grant them knowledge at an unspecified cost; Jester uses it to confirm Lucien's plan but the statues age her by five years. Caduceus again questions DeRogna's spirit and learns she planned to restore the Cognouza Ward in the hopes of joining the Somnovem, the city's leaders, to gain access to powerful and long-forgotten magic. The Mighty Nein realize neither Lucien nor DeRogna know the city's escape to the Astral Sea drove its residents insane. They beat the Tombtakers to site A2, where they find a biological-weapons laboratory and a hideously mutated creature.
| 119 | "Malice and Mystery Below" | December 15, 2020 | - |
The fight with the creature is complicated by the unstable magic of Aeor, which creates odd effects. After a lengthy fight, the Mighty Nein kill the creature and explore deeper into the ruins of the laboratory, where they find another two mutated monsters inert in their holding chambers. Further investigation uncovers a passage to an arboretum filled with corrupted trees; Caduceus finds this unsettling because the corruption is similar to the one threatening the Savalirwood and the forests around his home. Jester uses a spell to locate the threshold crest. The party evade a trapped corridor to enter the vault holding the gemstone.
| 120 | "Contentious Company" | December 22, 2020 | - |
Despite being tired from the battle in the laboratory, the Mighty Nein are drawn into another fight in the vault, this time with an automaton. They recover the threshold crest and escape site A5, pausing long enough for Jester to burn the corrupted forest in the arboretum. Caleb casts Leomund's Tiny Hut to create a campsite that is protected from the elements but the party wake to find themselves surrounded by Lucien and the Tombtakers, who have timed their arrival so the Mighty Nein have not fully rested, and thus have not recovered their health or spells. Lucien asks the party to hand over the threshold crest but Fjord persuades him to let the Mighty Nein join him on the final leg of the journey to Aeor.

=== 2021 ===
List of episodes in 2021
| Episode | Title | Original release date | Notes |
|---|---|---|---|
| 121 | "Ice and Fire" | January 14, 2021 | - |
The alliance between the Mighty Nein and the Tombtakers begins poorly as both sides try to put the other at a disadvantage. When Fjord and Caleb probe Lucien for more information about their quest, Lucien says he does not fully understand his role as the Nonagon. The combined party try to cross an icy bridge over a river of lava; the attempt goes poorly when they inadvertently awaken a group of fire elementals. During the escape, Jester and Veth try to sabotage the Tombtakers with mixed results. Jester tries to drop a threshold crest into the lava but it misses. Veth is caught trying to cast a spell on one of the Tombtakers. Lucien loses patience with the Mighty Nein until Jester offers to tell his fortune using Mollymauk's tarot cards. While he is initially enthusiastic, he finds her predictions unsettling.
| 122 | "Nothing Ventured, Nothing Gained" | January 21, 2021 | - |
Lucien lends Caleb and Beau a book that recounts an early expedition to the ruins of Aeor. The author, a mage, entered the Astral Sea to visit the Cognouza Ward and on his return, the tone of the book changes to rambling nonsense and disturbing, half-finished, magical glyphs. Lucien describes the Somnovem as the collective consciousness of powerful mages and tries to tempt the Mighty Nein with the promise of harnessing their power to bend reality to their will. Veth speculates Lucien plans to kill the Mighty Nein and use their bodies as vessels for the Somnovem. Veth convinces Fjord they should kill Lucien and the Tombtakers first. Jester and Yasha refuse as they believe that Mollymauk can be saved. With one day left on their journey to Aeor, Caleb invites Lucien and the Tombtakers into the tower as a show of good faith. That night, he and Beau are pulled into the Astral Sea while dreaming. They are confronted by a vision of the Somnovem and wake to find their bodies marked with a single eye tattoo like the markings shared by Lucien and DeRogna.
| 123 | "Fair-weather Faith" | January 28, 2021 | - |
The Mighty Nein experiment with the markings on Beau and Caleb but are unable to determine their nature or remove them. They resolve to keep the markings hidden from Lucien for as long as possible. On the final day of their journey to Aeor, the combined party come under attack from Gelidon, an ancient white dragon the Mighty Nein previously encountered outside Uthodurn and who has been tracking them ever since. Gelidon retreats when the party prove more capable than she expected, and the Mighty Nein make camp. During the night, they realize the Tombtakers stole the threshold crest during the battle with Gelidon and decide to give chase. At Jester's insistence, they try to intercept the Tombtakers before they reach Aeor but with Lucien's ability to negate all magic, the Mighty Nein are almost killed but manage to regroup and flee.
| 124 | "A Walk to Warmer Welcomes" | February 4, 2021 | - |
The Mighty Nein flee with a stolen threshold crest. The Tombtakers pursue but the Mighty Nein evade them for the night. In the morning, the party attempt to magically send the threshold crest to the Cobalt Soul in Rexxentrum. They make their way to a nearby Dynasty outpost to meet Essek, who tells them the Tombtakers need to take the threshold crests into the Astral Sea to pull the city into the Prime Material Plane. The Mighty Nein believe by sending the threshold crest away, they have delayed the Tombtakers' plans by one week so Essek recommends they use this time to gather allies and information. Promising his help, Essek instructs them to speak to him again when they are ready to descend into Aeor's ruins. The Mighty Nein confirm through scrying the Tombtakers have detoured away from Aeor and so teleport to Nicodranas.
| 125 | "The Neverending Day" | February 11, 2021 | - |
The Mighty Nein seek help from Yussa and Allura, who do not know much but provide the party with equipment to survive the Astral Sea. Yussa retrieves the gem holding Halas' consciousness and Caleb tricks Halas into revealing what he knows. Halas claims there were no survivors of Aeor, implying the Cognouza Ward was consumed by something alien in the Astral Sea. The party teleport to Rexxentrum, where they plan to meet Astrid, who they hope can provide a way to counteract the blood magic Lucien uses to track them. They learn from the Cobalt Soul the King's spy network is investigating the Cerberus Assembly, making this task nearly impossible. That night, Caduceus has a premonition of a new threat to his home while Caleb and Beau are again pulled into the Astral Sea by the Somnovem.
| 126 | "Worth Fighting For" | February 18, 2021 | - |
Caleb and Beau awaken to find they both have a second marking from the Somnovem but the markings appear to be benign. Caduceus shares his premonition with the party and they decide to return to the glade once their business in Rexxentrum is finished. Caduceus believes the corruption of the Savalirwood might have more to do with the downfall of Aeor than the party first thought. Caleb arranges to meet Astrid, who agrees to help the party. She reveals the Cerberus Assembly were following the Mighty Nein in Eiselcross and that they are aware of Vess DeRogna's disappearance but not the circumstances of it. Astrid suggests Caleb uses DeRogna's disappearance and the king's investigation to assassinate Ikithon and take his place on the Assembly. Caleb refuses, at least until Lucien has been dealt with. That evening, Beau and Yasha borrow Caleb's tower and spend the night together, declaring their love for one another.
| 127 | "Sarsaparilla, Licorice, and Red Hot" | February 25, 2021 | - |
Astrid tells the Mighty Nein amulets that can protect against scrying magic are kept in the Vergessen Sanatorium, which is controlled by Ikithon. Caleb, Veth, and Jester break into the sanatorium to steal the amulets while the other members of the group remain outside on lookout. The break-in group find and take the amulets but alert Ikithon to their presence and are unable to escape before he confronts them.
| 128 | "Cat and Mouse" | March 4, 2021 | - |
Jester teleports Veth, Caleb, and herself away from Ikithon, and the party reconvene in Nicodranas. They worry Ikithon could attack them through their families, a fear that is confirmed when they receive a warning from Astrid to run and take anyone important with them. Taking Marion, Yeza, and Luc, they flee to Tidepeak Tower but discover that Yusa is on a fact-finding trip to the Astral Sea and is currently indisposed. Exhausted and with Ikithon's group nearly upon them, Caleb reads from a magic scroll that will teleport them to an unknown plane of existence.
| 129 | "Between a Ball and a Hot Place" | March 11, 2021 | - |
The group find themselves on the plane of elemental fire and are attacked by a fire elemental. They defeat it but Luc dies in the battle and Caduceus magically resurrects him. After a night's sleep, Jester magically returns the party to their own world, in Zadash. They leave Marion, Yeza and Luc—each now wearing an amulet to protect against scrying—under the protection of The Gentleman.
| 130 | "The Calm Before The Storm" | March 18, 2021 | - |
While most of the party shop for supplies, Veth talks with Yeza about their future, and Jester talks separately to her parents because they are too nervous to talk to each other. Unable to spare more time to spend with their families, the group teleport to Caduceus's home in the Blooming Grove, where he talks with his family and everyone meditates on the task they have to perform.
| 131 | "Into the Eye" | March 25, 2021 | - |
Yasha receives a lucid vision from her patron god the Storm Lord, in which she fights several spirits of storm and lightning. By defeating them, she proves to the Storm Lord she is his champion. Caleb attempts to teleport the group back to the Dynasty's outposts at Aeor but the magic is off-target and they must spend an additional day trekking across Eiselcross to reach their destination. Once there, they meet with Essek, who agrees to accompany them into the ruins of Aeor.
| 132 | "Aeor" | April 1, 2021 | - |
Essek and the Mighty Nein go to the entrance of Aeor, where they meet with Dagen and a group of Dynasty rangers, who tell them nobody else has entered while they were on watch. Entering the ruins of the city, they encounter hazards such as undead frost giants and a brown mold that sucks heat from its surroundings. Overcoming these obstacles, they go deeper and begin to plot an ambush for the Tombtakers.
| 133 | "Hunter and Hunted" | April 8, 2021 | - |
The group head deeper into Aeor, looking for any information about what Lucien is seeking and suitable places to lay an ambush. Failing to find a better location, they return to a courtyard near the entrance and set a trap for the Tombtakers before going to sleep for the night. They are awoken by the Tombtakers springing their trap. Three of the Tombtakers—Zoran, Tyffial, and Otis—are killed but Lucien and Cree escape after a brief confrontation, collapsing a tunnel behind them to prevent pursuit.
| 134 | "The Streets of the Forgotten" | April 15, 2021 | - |
The Mighty Nein clear the blocked passage, and track Lucien and Cree deeper into Aeor. They find a heavily-damaged robot and manage to reactivate it. It has amnesia and does not recall its own name so the group decide to call it Charlie. Charlie asks to be taken to the Genesis Ward, where it believes it could be repaired. Preparing to rest for the night, Jester scries on Cree, and sees the two remaining Tombtakers bandaging their wounds and seemingly also preparing to sleep.
| 135 | "The Genesis Ward" | April 22, 2021 | - |
Beau and Caleb wake from a dream to discover they have each received an additional eye marking while they slept. The party continue to pursue Lucien through Aeor and find many relics of the fallen civilization. Of the magical writing equipment they find, Caleb and Essek are most intrigued by the Aeorian use of dunamancy, a type of magic previously thought to be unique to the Dynasty. They also find a repair terminal that magically restores Charlie the robot. With his memory now intact, he introduces himself as Devexian and thanks the group for repairing him. He does not accompany the group further but directs them to a place called the Immensus Gate, which is Lucien's most-probable destination.
| 136 | "Hell or High Water" | April 29, 2021 | - |
Beau and Caleb realize the eyes that have appeared on their bodies have granted them new abilities; they are now able to see in the dark, see through illusions, and telepathically project their thoughts to others. The group continue and reache the Immensus Gate, only to find Lucien and Cree have already been there. They watch as Cree and Lucien operate the gate, calling forth a water elemental before using the gate to transport themselves to the Astral Sea. The Mighty Nein fight their way past the elemental then pursue Lucien and Cree through the gate and into the Astral Sea.
| 137 | "Welcome to Cognouza" | May 6, 2021 | - |
In the Astral Sea, The Mighty Nein pursue Lucien and Cree through the city Cognouza. They discover the city is made of flesh, formed into repeating patterns that show only a facade of a city. They are also contacted by members of the Somnovem, the leaders of the city, who seem to have conflicting personalities and agenda.
| 138 | "Where There Is A Will..." | May 13, 2021 | - |
The adventurers confront Cree and learn she has attached a threshold crest to the city, which will be used to transport Cognouza to Exandria. Jester and Caleb work to remove the crest while the rest of the party fight and kill Cree. They descend to the center of the city, where they discover the Aether Crux, a nexus that houses the gestalt consciousness of the Somnovem. With the Somnovem and The Mighty Nein distracted by each other, Lucien arrives and detonates a psychic explosive on the Aether Crux.
| 139 | "Rebirth" | May 20, 2021 | - |
The group engage in combat with Lucien, who has absorbed the power of the Somnovem. Throughout the fight, they appeal to memories of Mollymauk, causing Lucien to twitch, and become distracted and angry. After a protracted battle, Lucien flees and descends to the Aether Crux. The party pursue him and find him emerging from a cocoon.
| 140 | "Long May He Reign" | May 27, 2021 | - |
The Mighty Nein again battle with Lucien, who now has a connection to the city Cognouza. After killing him, the party retrieve his body and resurrect the soul of Mollymauk into it. Mollymauk awakens with amnesia, remembering nothing of his previous lives as Mollymauk or as Lucien.
| 141 | "Fond Farewells" | June 3, 2021 | - |
Having saved the world, the party attempt to rest and recover at Caduceus's home in the Blooming Grove but they are confronted by Ikithon who has tracked Caleb and seeks to kill him. They fight Ikithon, capture him and force him to stand trial for his crimes. The members of the Mighty Nein then disband and build their own lives while promising to always be there for each other when they are needed.

=== Specials ===
List of specials
| No. | Title | Original release date | Notes |
|---|---|---|---|
| 1 | "The Mighty Nein Reunited Part 1 – Unfinished Business" | November 17, 2022 | The episode was simulcast in Cinemark Theatres alongside the regular Twitch and YouTube livestream. |
Set six months after the destruction of Lucien, the Mighty Nein are scattered across Wildemount. In Nicodranas, Veth is running the Wildemount Wildlings camp for teenaged adventurers. In Zadash, Beau returns home to Yasha who is in their garden. Caleb heads home after giving a lecture at the Soltryce Academy in Rexxentrum. Meanwhile, Fjord, Jester, and Kingsley have taken the party's ship to the Swavain Islands. As a storm overtakes the ship, a storm giant and other Uk'otoa minions emerge to attack them. The brutal fight halts when Jester is knocked unconscious. In exchange for sparing them, Fjord trades the Cloven Crystal. However, after leaving the deck, the giant punches holes into the keel forcing the crew to flee in Kingsley's magical lifeboat as the ship sinks. Jester contacts Caleb and Veth via Sending which leads to Caleb teleporting around to gather the far-flung party members. Together with the crew they teleport from the Twinward Isles to Nicodranas. The next day, the party heads to the last temple in hopes of preventing the Cloven Crystal from being used. Fjord discovers various ancient Wildmother statues in the ruins. As they set up an ambush point, the giant approaches.
| 2 | "The Mighty Nein Reunited Part 2 – Uk'otoa Unleashed" | December 1, 2022 | The episode was simulcast in Cinemark Theatres alongside the regular Twitch and YouTube livestream. |
The giant is joined by various minions. During the fight, it focuses on destroying the temple. While they kill the giant, the Mighty Nein fail to prevent the unsealing beneath the temple. As the glyphs go off, Beau determines that they are in the Betrayer God Zehir's temple; Uk'otoa was imprisoned by Zehir. As Fjord senses that Uk'otoa is free, an apparition of Zehir demands answers. Zehir offers his mark which is required to reseal Uk'otoa. Returning to Nicodranas, the party see massive black clouds on the southern horizon and discover the Clovis Concord navy mobilizing. The party sleep on a chartered ship heading to confront Uk'otoa. To prepare, Fjord casts Underwater Breathing on everyone. The multi-eyed leviathan destroys many ships during the battle but the Mighty Nein damage Uk'otoa to the point of it withdrawing. Using the mark of Zehir, Fjord re-imprisons Uk'otoa which leaves three new Cloven Crystals. The party once again head off in different directions. Fjord entrusts one crystal to the Cobalt Soul, hides one on Rumblecusp, and keeps the location of the third secret. Soon after arriving home, Caleb is greeted by Essek who kisses him and asks for the story of defeating Uk'otoa.
| 3 | "The Mighty Nein Reunion: Echoes of the Solstice" | October 26, 2023 | This episode was recorded live on October 25, 2023 at the OVO Arena Wembley. In addition to the regular Twitch and YouTube live stream, it was shown in Cinemark Theatres in the United States and in Cineplex Theatres in Canada. |
Seven years later, Beau and Caleb are captured by Ludinus during the Apogee Solstice. (Note: As seen in Campaign Three Episodes 50 & 51.) Across Exandria, magical chaos unfolds. Beau and Caleb are magically shunted away. Caleb realizes the arcane collar preventing him from casting has failed and assumes similar collars, such as Ikithon's, are broken. Utilizing teleportation, they gather the Mighty Nein. Veth is unwilling to join the party in verifying Ikithon's status as she is in charge of campers. Veth's now teenage son Luc leaps into Caleb's Teleportation Circle to Rexxentrum. While investigating, they discover the enchantments in the Cobalt Soul's Vellum Basement have failed. Ikithon left behind verbal taunts throughout the vaults including an invitation to Caleb's hometown. In the morning, they head for Blumenthal to find Caleb's childhood home rebuilt and his dead parents seemingly alive having breakfast with Ikithon. The ensuing fight with Ikithon reveals they are undead. Ikithon then uses an artifact that unleashes Omentis, a 35-foot-tall abyssal creature, before merging with it. The Mighty Nein responds with Polymorph and other magical attacks – Jester casts Gate to draw Artagan directly into the fight. Beau pulls the artifact from the creature's chest; the artifact entraps both Omentis and Ikithon, as Caleb seals the artifact away in a demi-plane. Jester agrees to Fjord's marriage proposal.
| 4 | "Jester and Fjord's Wedding" | November 5, 2025 | This episode was recorded live on October 7, 2025 at the Radio City Music Hall. It was then shown in cinemas by Fathom Events on October 15, 2025 at 7 p.m. local time. |
The next great adventure: the marriage of Jester and Fjord.
| 5 | "[PROJEKT] Funball" | July 14, 2026 | This episode was recorded live on July 6, 2026 at the Uber Arena as part of Critical Role's Echoes of Exandria live show tour. |
An adventure to save Caleb who has become a corrupted maze master after his and Essek's experimentation in the Folding Halls of Halas went gone wrong.
| 6 | "Darktow" | July 21, 2026 | This episode was recorded live on July 12, 2026 at Edinburgh Castle as part of Critical Role's Echoes of Exandria live show tour. |
An adventure to help Kingsley who is attempting to claim the throne of Darktow.

== Reception ==
Multiple critics recommended the second campaign as the Critical Role series to start with. Dais Johnston, writing for Inverse, commented that the second campaign is the "perfect starting place" as it features "all-new characters and storylines". USA Today highlighted that by having few references to the events of the first campaign, the second campaign is "a great starting point for new viewers who are mostly unfamiliar with the show's timeline". According to Alexandria Turney of Screen Rant, Campaign one's lower initial quality "can be off-putting", while Campaign two is "highly recommended" for newcomers, "as it makes it easier to fall in love with the cast, which then makes it easier to go back and watch" Campaign one. Emily Duncan of Tor.com wrote; "the second campaign somehow has a radically different flavor to the first, while still being just as charming and chaotic". On the differences between campaigns, Duncan highlighted that the second campaign has player character death, an ocean based arc and more political tension with two countries close to war with one another leading to difficult "political maneuvers" by the party "to keep the worst from happening". Duncan also commended the setting design for ignoring "the problematic Dungeons and Dragons concept of 'evil races'" with cities inhabited by traditionally monstrous races such as goblins, kobolds, bugbears and drow.

Critical Role has been credited by VentureBeat as responsible for making actual play shows "their own genre of entertainment", and has since become one of the most prominent actual play series. In December 2018, Chey Scott, for Inlander, wrote; "one of the most popular live-play Dungeons & Dragons web series is Critical Role ... the first episode of the series' current season, which debuted in January 2018, has more than 3.1 million views". In February 2019, Jeremy Thomas of 411Mania highlighted that Critical Role "regularly garners viewership in the tens of thousands each Thursday night. It and its Tuesday discussion show Talks Machina are Geek & Sundry's most popular shows by far, both on Twitch and Legendary's Project Alpha". Andy Wilson, for Bleeding Cool, called Critical Role "the best show I've watched all year" in 2020, and "one of the most-watched" shows on Twitch; he also noted that it had a COVID-19 safe-filming protocol which allowed the show to continue production. Wilson wrote on the importance of giving fans "something to look forward to every week" during the "monotony and despair" of quarantine.

However, critics emphasized the length of Critical Role as a potential entry barrier to viewers. Both Turney and Johnston called starting the series "daunting" due to the episode lengths. Brie Mihele of TheGamer wrote the show's length "can be a huge barrier to starting" the show as Critical Role has produced new content every week "for the past two years" and that watching that enormity can seem "like an uphill battle". She noted three ways to catch up: Critical Role's official Critical Recap videos, the fan-run website "CritRoleStats", and traditional binge-watching. Turney also wrote that viewers should enjoy the show at "their own pace" and "not stress about completing all episodes" within a set period of time; additionally, there are many "Critical Role summaries and recaps" online for those "who want to quickly catch up to a certain arc".

"Ours is a story of heroism and hope in a dark world. A story many of us need. One that turns in unexpected ways, and one I believe in."

— Dungeon Master Matt Mercer, in response to fan backlash over Molly's death.

Critics also commented on the campaign's various plot twists and revelations, with a particular emphasis on Mollymauk's death and the return of his body in the form of the antagonist Lucien. Tyler Wilde, writing for PC Gamer in 2018, said Molly's death impacted both the cast and the community with the Twitch audience left "inconsolable". Wilde commented that it showcases the difference between live and scripted shows – "it was heartbreaking, but chance is partly what makes Critical Role and other tabletop gaming shows alluring". Wilde also highlighted that the player character death changed how "play is interpreted" as with the addition of proven mortality, recklessness feels like a bolder choice by the players. Aimee Hart, in a retrospective for Polygon in 2026, commented that Mollymauk's death occurred when Critical Role still live streamed so both the audience and cast experienced "the emotions and circumstances at the same time, giving authenticity not only to Taliesin Jaffe's despair at the loss of his character but also to the heartbreak of Dungeon Master Matthew Mercer and Jaffe's fellow castmates". Hart opined that player character deaths in subsequent campaigns have less of an edge, as the episodes being pre-recorded has allowed Critical Role to announce ahead of time when an episode will "be particularly stressful". Margarida Bastos included Molly's funeral on Collider's "9 Most Memorable Moments From Critical Role's The Mighty Nein" list stating that "it's impossible not to be moved by the actors' heartfelt performances. Moreover, the fact that Molly's funeral acquires a whole new connotation almost a hundred episodes later, establishes the full relevance of this moment in the grander scheme of the story".

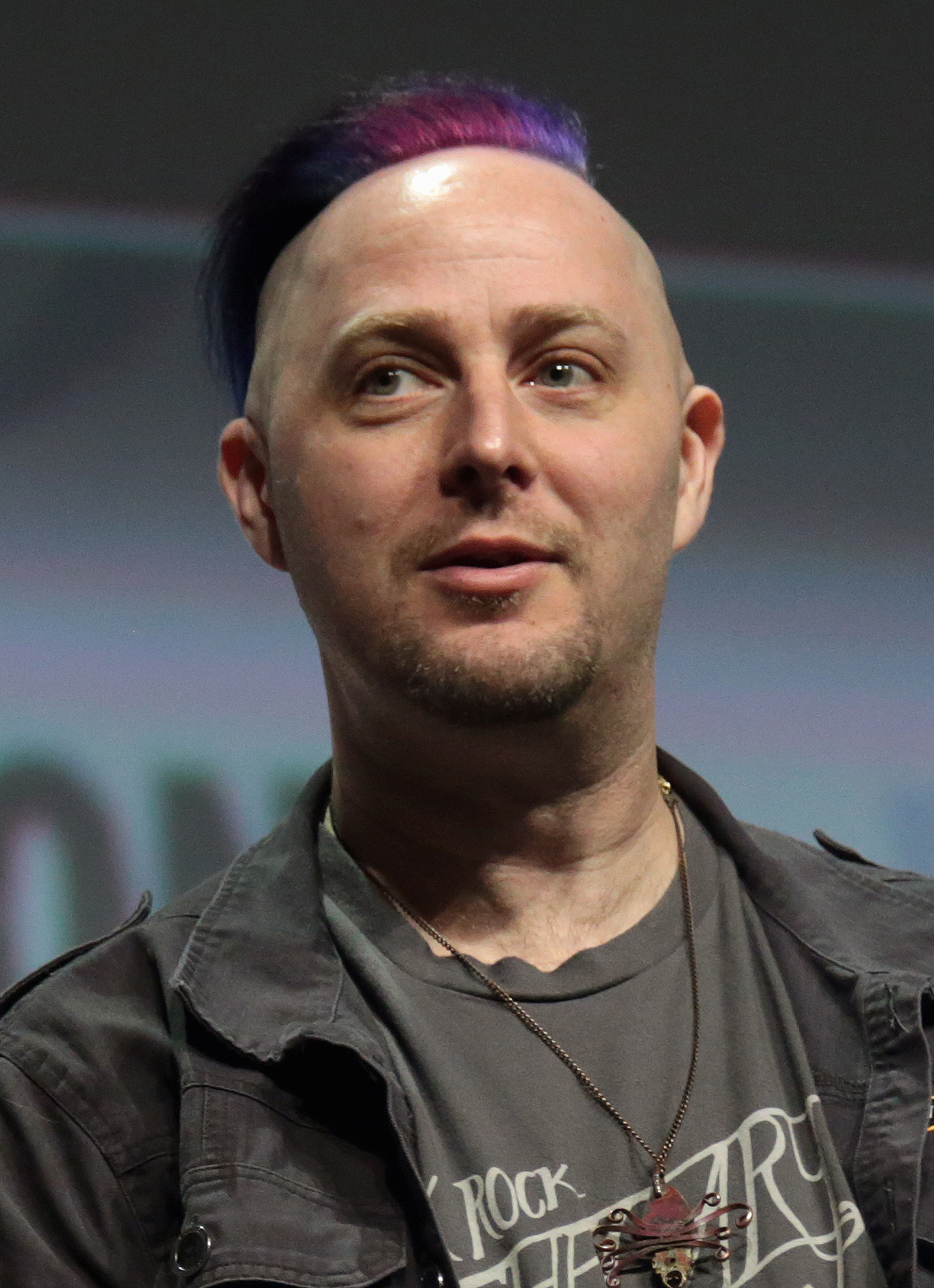
Jaffe's character death shaped the campaign

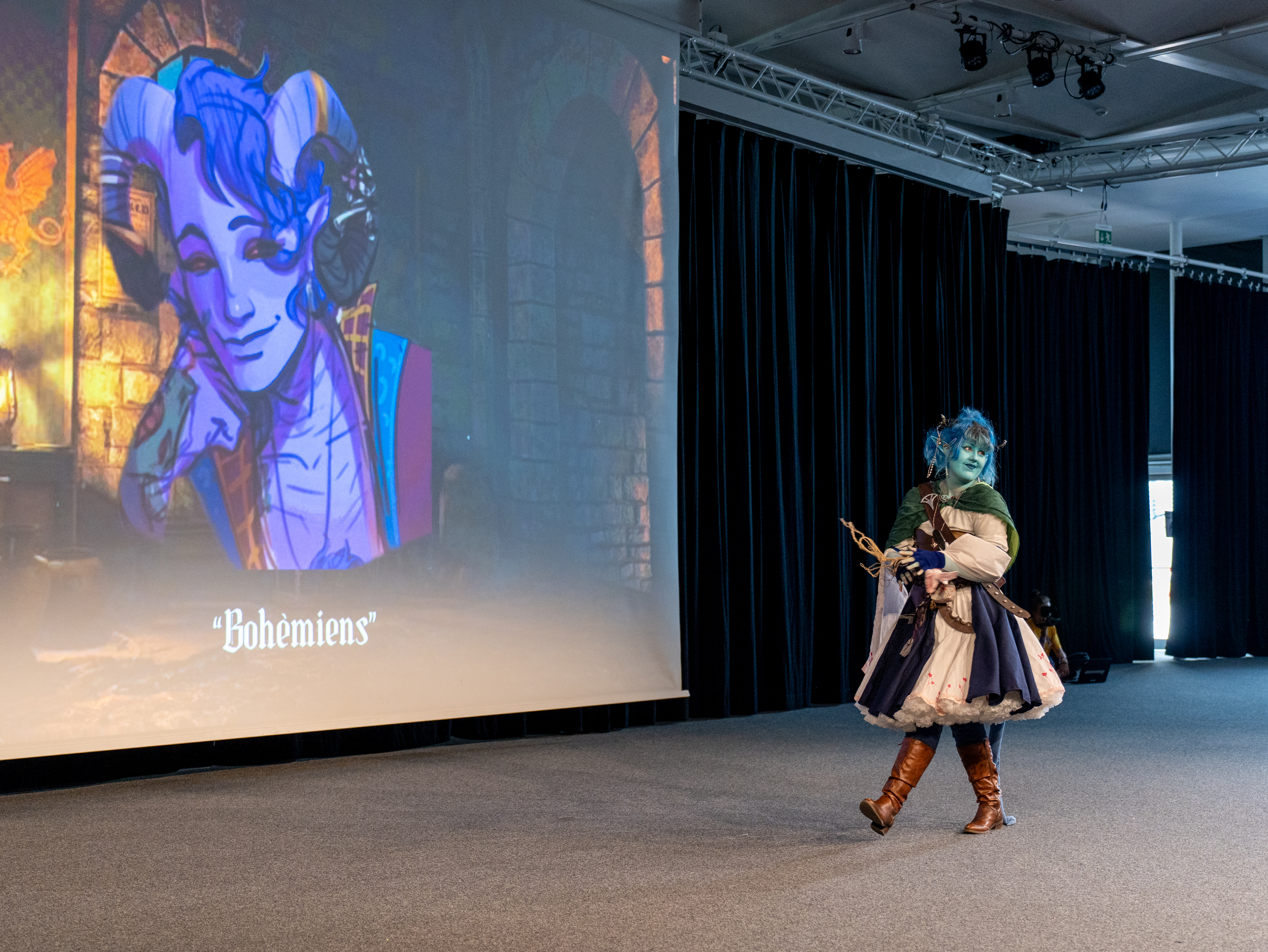
A cosplay depiction of Jester in front of a fanart image of Molly

Christian Hoffer of ComicBook has highlighted multiple revelations in Campaign two, including Molly's body appearing to be alive in Episode 111. According to Hoffer, "one of the biggest twists of the series" is Molly's resurrection – "we could be heading towards another an epic storyline centered around the only Critical Role PC who died in the middle of a campaign and wasn't brought back to finish his story. Madison Durham, writing for Polygon in 2022, stated that "unlike the somewhat cut-and-dried villainy of earlier Critical Role villains like Vecna, Lucien posed a particular problem for the party during his tenure" especially as the player characters "were forced to weigh the atrocity of Lucien's actions against the preciousness of his body". Academics Zac Boyd and Míša Hejná, in the journal Language in Society, determined through "holistic analysis of voice quality" of NPCs voiced by Mercer that "breathiness" in his voice "emerged as signalling positive morality" while "whisperiness signals negative morality and stances of threat". They highlighted that in case of Lucien, "inauthenticity" can be heard during "Lucien's fake alliance—he adopts breathiness at times, but this breathiness is not the same as the breathiness of the genuine allies". They stated that this character's voice becomes "unambiguously whispery" when "explicitly" threatening the party and when discussing "the Somnovem and his end goals", noting "Mercer employs phonatory variation to take both direct and indirect stances of threat, both of which signal Lucien's intent and moral character". Academic Emma French, in Real Life in Real Time: Live Streaming Culture (2023), highlighted "Laura Bailey's decision to nonviolently defeat an opponent using an insignificant, novelty magical item"; while it "made expert use of in-game mechanics", the sequence "was mainly praised for how it served the narrative" as "Bailey was perceived as remaining true to her character, Jester". Boyd and Hejná highlighted that during this encounter, following the hag's consumption of a magically adjusted cupcake, the hag's "vocal profile becomes breathier and her pitch dynamism also momentarily increases, drawing on resources that indicate she is less antagonistic and (at least momentarily) no longer a threat".

Several critics also highlighted how the Mighty Nein changed over the course of the campaign. Duncan found the party healing from trauma over the course of the campaign "wonderfully rewarding". Academics Lisa Horton and David Beard, in the book The Routledge Handbook of Remix Studies and Digital Humanities (2021), highlighted the "found-family" group dynamic model which "the newly fledged Mighty Nein began to emulate and improve to the extent that this became a subtheme for the entire campaign". Wilson stated that from the perspective of a fan:

We cheered for characters in their growth and development. We got gigantic payoffs for story seeds planted literally years earlier, mysteries uncovered, and romances finally consummated. There is more heart, more pain and glory, more comedy, more tension on Critical Role every week than any other show on television. And they do it all with the most basic of methods.

Michael Buttrey and Leah DeJong, in an essay in the book Theology, Religion, and Dungeons & Dragons (2025), highlighted that Yasha has a redemption arc which "spans over 100 episodes" and "as Yasha uncovers her past, hunts down the evil that haunts her, and endures the challenges and suffering set by the Stormlord, she undergoes a parallel physical transformation" as mechanically her race changes "from Fallen Aasimar to protector Aasimar". They note she gets a happy ending "living with her girlfriend" and has "transitioned away from a life of fighting and darkness". Similarly, Lin Yang of The Michigan Daily highlighted the narrative arc of the non-player character Essek Thelyss who Mercer intended to be an "antagonistic force", however, Essek instead "beat the odds set by the dungeon master" as his friendship with the Mighty Nein put him on a different path. Yang noted that Essek serves as a "foil for Caleb" as both characters must reconcile past "mistakes and atrocities. Out of all the stories told about hubris and allegiances, there are not many that put the focus on what it means to recover after irrevocably messing up your life. [...] At the lowest point of Essek's character arc, Caleb offers him what the rest of the Nein offered Caleb – an opportunity to become someone beyond his mistakes".

Robyn Hope, in an essay in the book Watch Us Roll (2021), felt the show's set design was "not distracting" but instead "evocative of the fantasy genre" with a façade of wood and stone along with "lighting on the back walls" that is changed "to match the mood of the scene". Hope commented that show is highly narrative focused, however, during combat "the players and viewers alike must understand the exact positions of their characters and the enemies, and so, [...] the Battle Cam shows us the miniatures Matt uses to model the battle for his players. Battle is when the mechanical frame tends to dominate" which is why an additional camera is used to clearly communicate the "battle flow". Hope also highlighted that the "expensive miniatures and maps" seen during combat scenes adds "gloss" to the "narrative immersion". Academic Jan Švelch wrote that the impact of official sponsorship by D&D Beyond "was immediately seen in the physical space of the gaming table. All main cast members now had tablet computers in front of them, allowing them to access their digital character sheets. Instead of shuffling through papers, players hunched over tablets trying to read an ability modifier or a spell description from a small screen". While the cast switched to tablets for this campaign, some "analog components" – from player diaries to dice and dice trays – "remained on the table". Švelch noted that the cast used dice trays provided by another sponsor, Wyrmwood. He highlighted that the mediatization of Critical Role is seen through its various sponsorships, however, the show still "promotes and celebrates analog play despite its mediated form".

=== Accolades ===
| Year | Award | Category | Recipient(s) | Result | Ref. |
|---|---|---|---|---|---|
| 2018 | Streamy Awards | Live Streamer | Critical Role | Nominated | |
| 2019 | Webby Awards | Video Series & Channels – Games | Critical Role | Won (Webby Award) | |
| 2019 | Webby Awards | Video Series & Channels – Games | Critical Role | Won (People's Voice) | |
| 2019 | Shorty Awards (11th) | Games | Critical Role | Finalist | |
| 2019 | Shorty Awards (11th) | Games | Critical Role | Won (Audience Honor) | |

== Adaptations ==
Multiple spin-offs and adaptations of the campaign have been released. The campaign sourcebook, titled Explorer's Guide to Wildemount, is a guide to the fictional setting of Campaign two; it includes series canon up to Campaign two episode 50. It is published by Wizards of the Coast and Critical Role. Two series of comic books expand on the campaign's setting; Critical Role: The Mighty Nein Origins focuses on the backstories of the main characters and Critical Role: The Tales of Exandria covers the side-stories of non-player characters. The novel Critical Role: The Mighty Nein – The Nine Eyes of Lucien (2022) focuses on Lucien, the tiefling antagonist of Campaign two, and his life before and after he meets the Mighty Nein. The novel Critical Role: The Mighty Nein – Children of Empire (2026) bridges the time between the second and third campaigns, with a focus on Caleb and Beau. Other products based on the campaign include the art book Critical Role: The Chronicles of Exandria The Mighty Nein, and the board game Uk'otoa.

As part of a sponsorship deal between Critical Role and D&D Beyond in 2018, an animated ad spot for the platform was produced which featured the Mighty Nein characters in combat. The animated ad "opened doors" for The Legend of Vox Machina (2022) to be produced. In January 2023, it was announced that the second campaign would receive an animated television adaptation for Amazon Prime Video titled The Mighty Nein. Metapigeon, (Note: Metapigeon is the production banner of Critical Role Productions.) Titmouse, Inc., and Amazon MGM Studios serve as the production companies. The series premiered on November 19, 2025. The second season is scheduled to premiere in its entirety on March 24, 2027.
