= D.Gray-man (TV series) =

2006 Japanese anime television series

- Type: TV series
- Genre: Adventure; Dark fantasy; Science fantasy
- Based on: D.Gray-man
- Created by: Katsura Hoshino
- Directed by: Osamu Nabeshima
- Series composition: Reiko Yoshida
- Character designer: Hideyuki Morioka
- Music by: Kaoru Wada
- Voices of: Sanae Kobayashi; Shizuka Itō; Takahiro Sakurai; Kenichi Suzumura; Megumi Toyoguchi; Mitsuo Iwata; Katsuyuki Konishi; Junpei Takiguchi; Ai Shimizu; Toshiyuki Morikawa
- Narrated by: Fumihiko Tachiki
- Opening themes: List: "Innocent Sorrow" by Abingdon Boys School (1–25); Brightdown" by Nami Tamaki (26–51); Doubt & Trust by Access (52–76); "Gekidō" by Uverworld (77–103)
- Ending themes: List: "Snow Kiss" by Nirgilis (1–13); "Pride of Tomorrow" by June (14–25); "Yume no Tsuzuki e" by Surface (26–38); "Antoinette Blue" by Nana Kitade (39–51); "Anata ga Koko ni Iru Riyū" by Rie fu (52–64); "Wish" by Sowelu (65–76); "Regret" by Mai Hoshimura (77–89); "Changin'" by Stephanie (90–103)
- No. of episodes: 103 (list of episodes)

Production
- Art director: Tōru Koga
- Sound director: Tōru Nakano
- Cinematographer: Eiji Tsuchida
- Color designer: Akemi Tejima
- Editor: Tomoki Nagasaka
- Studio: TMS Entertainment
- Producers: Fukashi Azuma (1–76); Shinichi Iwata (77–103); Akiyo Oguma; Yōsuke Tsuruki
- Production companies: TV Tokyo; Dentsu; TMS Entertainment
- Runtime: 23 minutes

Original release
- Network: TXN (TV Tokyo)
- Release: October 3, 2006 – September 30, 2008

Related
- D.Gray-man Hallow (2016)

D.Gray-man is a Japanese anime television series based on Katsura Hoshino's manga series D.Gray-man. It was produced by TMS Entertainment and broadcast for 103 episodes on TV Tokyo and its affiliates from October 2006 to September 2008. Set in an alternate 19th century, the story follows Allen Walker, a young exorcist who joins an organization called the Black Order. The Black Order uses an ancient substance called Innocence to combat the Millennium Earl, a man who intends to destroy humanity with his demonic army of Akuma.

A 13-episode sequel series, D.Gray-man Hallow, also produced by TMS Entertainment, aired from July to September 2016.

== Plot ==
The story follows a young exorcist named Allen Walker who has been spending several years of training under his mentor Cross Marian to defeat machine-like creatures known as Akuma created by a man known as the Millennium Earl. For this purpose Allen wields an "Anti-Akuma" weapon to destroy the Akumas and let their souls pass to the afterlife. Once finishing his training, Allen travels to the Black Order which is primarily composed of other exorcists and several supporting staff members. Allen learns from his new superior Komui Lee that the Anti-Akuma weapons are actually powered up by a divine instrument known as Innocence and that the exorcists' mission is to recovering it alongside a "Heart" before the Earl. Now a rookie exorcist, Allen starts travelling with his new teammates to different locations in the world to recover other pieces of the Innocence. Besides being confronted by Akumas that are evolving into stronger foes, Allen is shocked to find that there are humans with supernatural powers serving the Earl, Noah's descendants. Amidst these foes, Allen also knows of other Generals serving the other including his Cross Marian who become the next targets of the Noah. Arriving in China, the search party learns that Cross recently left for Edo, but his ship has been lost at sea. Nevertheless, the group of Exorcists prepare to sail to Edo, certain that Cross survived.

In their journey to Edo, Allen splits from the group to face the former exorcist Suman Dark who is being tortured by the Innocence as a result of betrayal. Allen tries to save Suman Dark from his own power but he dies in the process. In the aftermath, Allen meets the Noah Tykk Mikk who destroys Allen's weapon and nearly kills him. Sammo Han Wong from the Asia Branch of the Black Order recollects Allen unaware of his survival while the rest members of the Black Order keep their journey. In the Asian Branch of the Order, Allen recovers but is unable to rebuild his weapon. This eventually leads him to his obsession with hunting the Akuma again as he can see their tormented souls through the eye that his adoptive father, Mana, placed on him years ago. While fighting a stronger Akuma, Allen recreates his Innocence under the name of Crowned Clown based on his mission to care for both humans and Akumas. Allen then joins with his other friends in Edo through an area known as Noah's Ark. Believing the exorcist Lenalee Lee carries the Heart, the Earl sends her to another Noah's Ark and the exorcists follow her. Allen and the others start fighting the Noah members in the Ark until its destruction. A hidden Cross Marian reveals to his pupil an area where he can play a piano to reconstruct the Ark much to Allen's confusion. Upon returning to the Order, the Noah send an army of Akumas that Allen, Lenalee and the remaining exorcists fight. Although they defeat all of them, the area is destroyed, causing the group to move to another place. As the series ends, the Millennium Earl enters into depression wondering why he never killed Allen when he met him as a child.

== Production ==
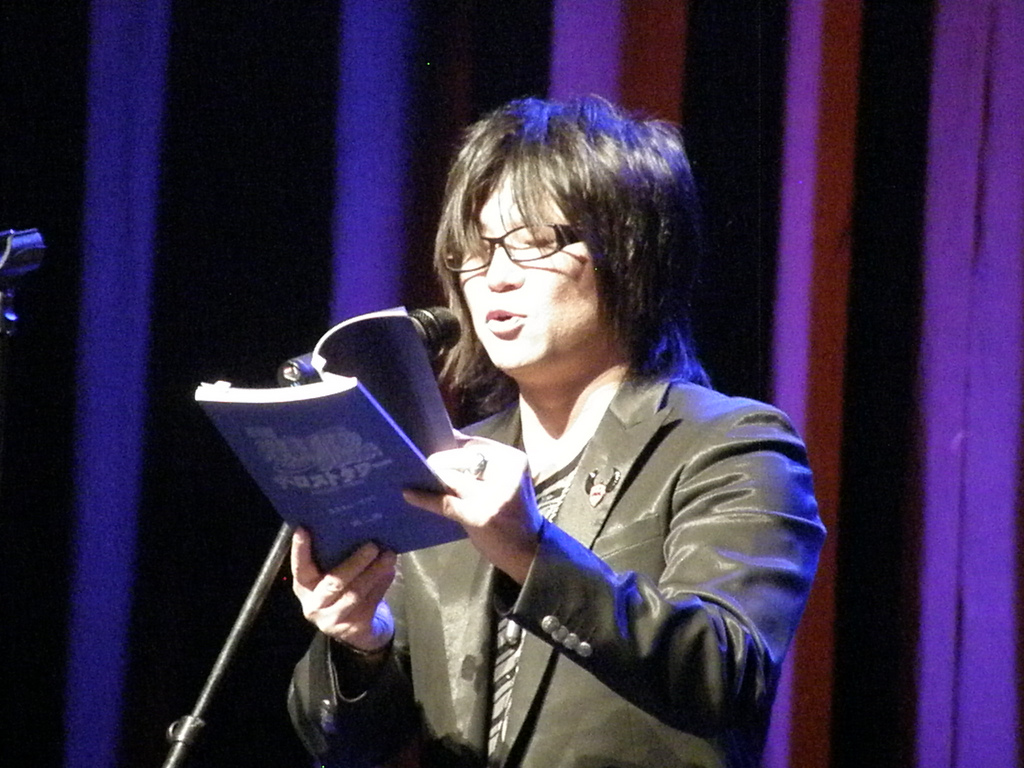
Japanese voice actor Toshiyuki Morikawa noted that the staff got along well while making the series

In June 2006, Shueisha announced that the D.Gray-man manga would be adapted as an anime. The series was directed by Osamu Nabeshima and produced by TMS Entertainment, which handled the animation, while Aniplex handled music production. During production, the original manga author, Katsura Hoshino, frequently visited the TMS Entertainment studio, where the voice actors sought advice about their characters. Although Hoshino was nervous about speaking with them, she was surprised by their dedication in practising their characters—particularly Sanae Kobayashi (Allen), Takahiro Sakurai (Kanda), Katsuyuki Konishi (Komui), and Hiroki Tōchi (Cross Marian)—and joked that Lenalee seemed more beautiful after she saw Shizuka Itō's work. Early in production, Hoshino was shown an early version of the first opening theme, "Innocent Sorrow" by the band Abingdon Boys School. When she saw the video, Hoshino cried in delight while the staff laughed.

Kobayashi enjoyed voicing Allen despite finding it challenging due to how often the character's mood changed when he was talking or fighting. Meanwhile, Takahiro Sakurai noted that Kanda's personality differed between the manga and the anime adaptation. Once the series began airing, Kobayashi commented that Allen would mature across the narrative as a result of his interactions with other characters from the series. Tyki Mikk's voice actor, Toshiyuki Morikawa, remembered the recording sessions for the series as "lively" because of the presence of many popular actors.

== Broadcast and release ==
The series began airing on October 3, 2006, on TV Tokyo. The 51-episode first season, known as the "1st stage", ended on September 25, 2007. The 52-episode second season, known as the "2nd stage", began on October 2, 2007, and ended on September 30, 2008, for a total of 103 episodes. The anime adapts the manga's storyline from the beginning and concludes after the destruction of the Black Order headquarters. The episodes were collected by Aniplex on 26 DVDs, released from February 7, 2007, to March 4, 2009.

The series was licensed for an English-language release in North America by Funimation, who released the first 51 episodes in two DVD sets, each consisting of two parts, from March 31, 2009, to January 5, 2010. The anime made its North American television debut on the Funimation Channel in September 2010. The first 51 episodes were released on four DVDs by Madman Entertainment from August 19, 2009, to May 13, 2010, and a DVD box set was released on June 6, 2012. In the United Kingdom, Manga Entertainment released the first 51 episodes in four parts from February 22 to October 18, 2010; a compilation DVD set was released on December 6 of that same year. On June 30, 2016, it was announced that Funimation had acquired the rights to the anime's second season. In August 2017, Funimation announced they would release the series's second half on home media version starting on October of the same year. In August, Crunchyroll started streaming the first 25 episodes of the series. The series was distributed in South and Southeast Asia territories by Odex. It was broadcast on Animax Asia.

== Music ==
The series features four opening theme songs and eight ending theme songs. The first opening song is "Innocent Sorrow", performed by Abingdon Boys School (eps. 1–25). The second opening song is "Brightdown", performed by Nami Tamaki (eps. 26–51). The third opening song is "Doubt & Trust" (Doubt & Trust 〜ダウト&トラスト〜), performed by Access (eps. 52–76). The fourth opening song is "Gekidō" (激動; lit. 'Turmoil'), performed by Uverworld (eps. 77–103). The first ending theme song is "Snow Kiss", performed by Nirgilis (eps. 1–13). The second ending theme song is "Pride of Tomorrow", performed by June (eps. 14–25). The third ending song is "Yume no Tsuzuki e" (夢の続きへ; lit. 'To the Next Part of the Dream'), performed by Surface (eps. 26–38). The fourth ending song is "Antoinette Blue" (アントワネットブルー, Antowanetto Burū), performed by Nana Kitade (eps. 39–51). The fifth ending song is "Anata ga Koko ni Iru Riyū" (あなたがここにいる理由; lit. 'The Reason You're Here'), performed by Rie fu (episodes 52–64). The sixth ending theme song is "Wish", performed by Sowelu (eps. 65–76). The seventh ending theme song is "Regret", performed by Mai Hoshimura (eps. 77–89). The eighth ending song is "Changin'", performed by Stephanie (eps. 90–103).

The music for the series was composed by Kaoru Wada, and four CD soundtracks were released by Aniplex. The first 34-track CD, D.Gray-man Original Soundtrack 1, which includes the first opening theme and the first two ending themes, was released on March 21, 2007. It was followed by the 32-track CD, D.Gray-man Original Soundtrack 2, which includes the second opening theme and the third and fourth ending themes, was released on December 19, 2007. All the opening and ending themes were collected on the D.Gray-man Complete Best CD, released on September 24, 2008. Its limited edition includes a DVD with credit-less footage of the series's introduction and ending scenes and anime illustrations. The third 31-track CD, D.Gray-man Original Soundtrack 3, was released on December 17, 2008. It includes the third and fourth opening themes, the fifth to eighth ending themes, and the insert song "Tsunaida te ni Kisu o" (つないだ手にキスを; lit. 'A Kiss on Our Joined Hands'), performed by Sanae Kobayashi (Allen Walker's Japanese voice actress).

== Reception ==
According to Gen Fukunaga, president and CEO of Funimation Entertainment, D.Gray-man was popular in Japan and the United States. The anime DVDs also proved popular, ranking highly on several Japanese animation DVD lists between 2007 and 2009, and the series was listed as one of the most-watched anime of the week.

In his review of the first episode, Carl Kimlinger of Anime News Network (ANN) commented that the series was not original but added that it offered ample entertainment. Todd Douglass Jr. of DVD Talk noted that Allen's use of the anti-Akuma weapon might have seemed clichéd but found it entertaining. He compared it to similar series, such as Naruto, Bleach, and One Piece, but felt that it stood out due to its darker atmosphere. Sandra Scholes of Active Anime offered a positive assessment of the series, commenting that it is "Dark, gothic and moody with a pinch of humour thrown in – remarkably enjoyable!". Kimberly Morales of Anime Insider said that the series's animation quality varied and that the story was "solid". In his review of the first 26 episodes, Tom Tonhat of The Escapist noted that the series borrows elements from other action anime, but found it entertaining overall, praising its protagonist, artwork, and setting. Tonhat also praised the Earl's modus operandi of reviving the dead as Akuma, viewing it as a strong theme that allowed viewers to sympathize with his victims. He also noted that the character's initial appearance as "nonthreatening" portly gentleman clown made his subsequent actions seem all the more vile. Neo found Lenalee's design likeable, balancing other male characters' bishōnen looks. The staff also liked her fighting abilities despite finding the name of her weapon, "Dark Boots", unfitting.

In a more negative review, Casey Brienza of ANN called the anime a poor adaptation of the manga. She criticized its overreliance on action sequences at the expense of a coherent story. Conversely, Neo enjoyed the direction of the episodes even when some were labeled "filler", as they allowed focus on the large cast. Allen's English-language voice actor, Todd Haberkorn, said that anime sales were poor despite generally positive reviews; he suggested that fans buy DVDs on sale to keep the series from being cancelled. Voice actor Travis Willingham was considered miscast as Kanda by Animation Insider. Neo found Junpei Takiguchi's work as the Earl in the Japanese version highly superior to that of the English dub's Jason Liebrecht.

In a retrospective review, Bolts of ANN praised D.Gray-man for using death as an overarching theme, contrasting it with shōnen series lacking permanence in death. The concept of the Millennium Earl's resurrection was considered one of the strongest villain concepts, and familiar tropes were used to establish scale and emotional weight. The reviewer found the episodic first quarter to be thematically cohesive, with the exorcist cast bound by loss. However, they acknowledged the filler material. The Vampire of the Old Castle story arc was highlighted for emotional resonance. They commented that the series was anchored by Allen Walker's perspective, noting his traumatic past and Pyrrhic victories, adding that the Noah family and biblical lore made the series more complex and humanized Allen. They found the animation to be unremarkable, citing off-model shots and still frames, but they noted an improvement in the second half. The Heart plotline was considered excessive because it introduced twists that detracted from other plot points, resulting in an incomplete story. Overall, Bolts described the series as having interesting ideas and a solid emotional core that did not reach its full potential.
