= D.Gray-man Hallow =

2016 Japanese anime television series

- Type: TV series
- Genre: Adventure; Dark fantasy; Science fantasy
- Based on: D.Gray-man
- Created by: Katsura Hoshino
- Directed by: Yoshiharu Ashino
- Screenplay by: Michiko Yokote; Tatsuto Higuchi; Kenichi Yamashita
- Character designer: Yōsuke Kabashima
- Music by: Kaoru Wada
- Opening themes: "Key -Bring It On, My Destiny-" by Lenny code fiction
- Ending theme: "Lotus Pain" by Mashiro Ayano
- No. of episodes: 13

Production
- Art director: Masatoshi Kai
- Sound director: Takeshi Takadera
- Cinematographer: Kwang-Jun Kim
- Color designer: Ayako Suenaga
- Editor: Tomoki Nagasaka
- Animation producer: Shūsuke Katagiri
- Studio: TMS/8PAN
- Producers: Akiko Nabeiwa; Kosuke Kazuno; Shizuka Kurosaki; Lisa Takeba; Keita Kodama
- Production companies: D.Gray-man Production Committee: Aniplex; Dentsu; Shueisha; TMS Entertainment; TV Tokyo
- Runtime: 24 minutes

Original release
- Networks: TV Tokyo, TVA, TVO
- Release: July 5 – September 27, 2016

Related
- D.Gray-man (2006–2008)

D.Gray-man Hallow (stylized as D.Gray-man HALLOW) is a Japanese anime television series based on Katsura Hoshino's manga series D.Gray-man, and is a sequel to its 2006–2008 anime series adaptation. It was produced by TMS Entertainment and directed by Yoshiharu Ashino. It was broadcast for 13 episodes on TV Tokyo, TV Aichi, and TV Osaka from July to September 2016. The series follows Allen Walker, a young exorcist from the Black Order whose mission is to destroy Akuma, weapons created by the Millennium Earl, using divine instruments known as "Innocence". The series was simultaneously broadcast in English by Funimation.

== Plot ==
The series follows Allen Walker, a young exorcist from the Black Order. The Black Order is responsible for destroying Akuma, weapons created by an ancient sorcerer known as the Millennium Earl, who is allied with the immortal Noah family. The Black Order uses objects known as "Innocence" to destroy the Akuma. The plot centers on Allen's connection to the Noah family and his ally, Yu Kanda, whom the Noahs plan to use.

== Production ==
The series was announced at Shueisha's 2016 Jump Festa event. It was produced by TMS Entertainment and directed by Yoshiharu Ashino, with scripts by Michiko Yokote, Tatsuto Higuchi, and Kenichi Yamashita, and character designs and chief animation direction by Yōsuke Kabashima.

During recordings of Hallow, manga author Katsura Hoshino was surprised by Ayumu Murase's performance as Allen Walker, considering him well suited for the character. Murase's alternation between two personalities—Allen and Nea D. Campbell—impressed Hoshino, who initially thought Murase was using a device to alter his tone. Although Murase appeared with Yutaka Aoyama, the voice actor for the Millennium Earl, only twice in Hallow, his work left a favorable impression. During a broadcast of Hallow, Hoshino produced multiple illustrations of Allen interacting with the Noah clan in support of the actors. Murase was moved by Hoshino's commitment to developing Allen in the manga and consequently formed a better impression of his character. Aoyama's performance received praise from Hoshino, as he had to portray both sides of the Earl: the free-spirited, clown-like persona and the mourning human self determined to recover his brother, Nea. Aoyama was surprised by Hoshino's comments and stated that he did not understand her overwhelming reaction. Aoyama also found playing the Earl's human form difficult because of how differently the character behaved in that appearance, regarding it as one of the hardest characters to voice.

== Broadcast and release ==
The series aired for 13 episodes on TV Tokyo, TV Aichi, and TV Osaka from July 5 to September 27, 2016. (Note: TV Tokyo listed the series air dates on Monday at 25:35, which is effectively Tuesday at 1:35 a.m. JST) The episodes were planned be collected in a total of six DVD and Blu-ray volumes in Japan. However, the home media release was delayed indefinitely in September 2016 for undisclosed reasons. In March 2017, the official D.Gray-man Hallow website stated the home media release was cancelled due to "various circumstances".

In Southeast Asia, the series was broadcast on Animax Asia. Funimation acquired the series for streaming on its FunimationNow platform.

== Music ==
The music of the series was composed by Kaoru Wada. The opening theme song is "Key -Bring It On, My Destiny-", performed by Lenny code fiction, and the ending theme song is "Lotus Pain", performed by Mashiro Ayano. The 40-track D.Gray-man Hallow soundtrack album was released on September 28, 2016.

== Episodes ==
No. overall	No. in season	Title	Original release date
104	1	"The 14th" Transliteration: "14 Banme" (Japanese: 14番目)	July 5, 2016
After completing an Innocence Retrieval Mission in a graveyard and fighting Akuma, Allen Walker and his fellow exorcists visit the newly built headquarters for the first time. Upon reaching the headquarters, Allen is greeted by Inspector Malcolm C. Rouvelier. Rouvelier binds Allen's left arm with seals and has him brought before his former master, General Cross Marian. Cross informs Allen that he will soon become the host of the 14th Noah, one of the immortal beings allied with the Millennium Earl, the creator of Akumas. The 14th, who is also the younger brother of Allen's late adoptive father, Mana Walker, was killed by the Earl after betraying him. Cross tells Allen that he will kill someone important to him once he becomes the 14th. That night, Cross receives a visit from someone unseen, and he is found dead in his room the next morning.
105	2	"Lonely Boy"; Transliteration: "Ronrī Bōi" (Japanese: ロンリーボーイ)	July 12, 2016
After Cross's body disappears, Allen finds a message from Cross inside Timcanpy. The message states that Timcanpy now belongs to Allen and that he should stop hiding behind Mana's "mask". Later, Allen, Yu Kanda, Noise Marie, and Howard Link embark on a mission in Paris to capture the Phantom Thief G. The Exorcists catch G stealing a crown from a museum, but he escapes by possessing others, including Link of the Black Order. After Allen scares G into leaving Link's body by stabbing him with his Sword of Exorcism, Marie tracks G's cries to his real body. They discover that G is Timothy, a young boy living in the Hearst Orphanage. While they are there, the orphanage is sealed in a separate dimension by dark magic, and they are attacked by a Level 4 Akuma accompanied by multiple high-level Akumas. A Level 2 Akuma that can turn people into dolls in six seconds captures G, and Link goes to his rescue but is also turned into a doll.
106	3	"I'll Be Okay After I Wash My Face"; Transliteration: "Kao o araeba Daijōbu" (Japanese: 顔を洗えば大丈夫)	July 19, 2016
Timothy awakens as an Accommodator and uses his Innocence to possess a Level 2 Akuma in order to fight back. The red-cloaked crow, Madarao, appears and breaks the seal to enter the orphanage. He "absorbs" the remaining Akuma. After stabbing himself and the Akuma with his sword, Allen manages to injure the Level 4 Akuma. This accidentally summons the 14th, who sends a message to the Earl through the Akuma. Kanda appears a while later and finishes off the Akuma with Allen. Later, Timothy decides to become an Exorcist on the condition that the Order pays for his crimes and keeps the orphanage running. He says a tearful farewell to the kind Mother, and Allen smiles and comments to Link that they were just like him and Mana
107	4	"Blood Crusade"; Transliteration: "Seisen Buraddo" (Japanese: 聖戦ブラッド)	July 26, 2016
Allen dreams that he meets Mana again in a post-apocalyptic city. When Lenalee Lee sees Allen when he wakes up, she thinks he looks like a different person. Renny Epstein, the chief of the North American branch, arrives and reveals that her red-cloaked companions are Third Exorcists created by the North American branch using a fragment from the Akuma egg that the exorcists tried to destroy during Lulu Bell's attack. Shortly after, Wisely, the last Noah, awakes. The Millennium Earl gathers the twelve Noah apostles and announces an unprecedented worldwide attack of Akuma. Allen and the Exorcists soon find themselves engaged in battle with hordes of Akuma. The Third Exorcists are dispatched to help, and they easily destroy the Akuma. However, Allen is disturbed to find that the Akuma's souls are destroyed instead of released. Suddenly, the Noah Tyki Mikk, Sheril Kamelot, and Maashiima attack, incapacitating Tokusa. Meanwhile, Wisely takes down Kanda, claiming that he needs his memories to awaken Alma Karma. Before losing consciousness, Kanda hears a woman's voice.
108	5	"Alma Karma"; Transliteration: "Aruma·Karuma" (Japanese: アルマ = カルマ)	August 2, 2016
North American Branch Head Renny Epstain gives the scientists a lecture about Alma Karma's holding facility. Alma has been in a coma for nine years. Her cells were fused with the Akuma Egg, which was then used to create the five Third Exorcists. Suddenly, the Earl and Road Kamelot arrive at the North American headquarters and summon several Level 4 Akuma to attack. Meanwhile, Sheril Kamelot forces several Black Order members in the branch to march to Alma's compound. They place the unconscious Kanda next to Alma. Soon after, Allen and Tokusa are also transported there via Noah's Ark. While the Earl holds Allen prisoner, the 14th takes over Allen's body, greets the Earl, and says that he will kill the Earl and take his place. Allen suppresses the 14th and tries to save his friends alongside the revived Kanda. However, Wisely sends Allen, Road, Kanda, and Alma's consciousness into Kanda's memories from nine years ago when Alma was still alive.
109	6	"Friend"	August 9, 2016
Kanda's memories reveal what happened nine years ago when he (then called Yu) and Alma were children and "Second Exorcists" living in the Sixth Laboratory of the Black Order's Asian Branch. Under the supervision of the North American Branch Head, Sahlins Epstain (Renny's father), the Asian Branch Head, Twi Chan, and her assistant, Edgar, they were forced to undergo harsh synchronization tests with Innocence daily, repeating the cycle of death and rebirth. Despite their different personalities and the hardships they endured, Yu and Alma became best friends. However, Yu began to have hallucinations of a woman near a lotus pond, whom Alma mistook for Fo. Because of the hallucinations, Sahlins and Twi decided to euthanize Yu. Alma tries to help Yu escape, but he is taken back to the laboratory to be sealed. However, he chances upon the recently blinded Noise Marie and young Bak Chan before that happens. He realizes that his hallucinations are memories of his past life, including seeing the woman he loved. He remembers that he was once an Exorcist who was killed by an Akuma. Alma tries to save Yu again by synchronizing with his Innocence. Then, Road reveals to Allen that the "Second Exorcists" are artificial humans created by placing the brains of deceased Exorcists into new regenerative bodies to ensure synchronization with the Innocence.
110	7	"The Truth about a Sterile Flower"; Transliteration: "Adabana no Shinjitsu" (Japanese: 徒花の真実)	August 16, 2016
Yu's desire to meet his past lover enables him to cancel the sealing enchantments and synchronize with his Innocence. Meanwhile, Bak Chan demands that Fo open the way to the Sixth Laboratory, where his parents are. However, Fo is under orders from Twi to keep the hallway sealed and allow only Renny to escape. Meanwhile, Yu finds Marie in a coma, destined to become the next Second Exorcist. He accidentally heals her mortal wound with his blood. Yu and Marie try to escape the Order together by finding Alma, but they discover that he has killed all the scientists in the laboratory, including the branch heads, because he regained the terrible memories of his past life when he received his innocence. Alma tries to kill Yu to end the Second Exorcist program. However, Yu's desire to live and find his love spurs him to kill Alma. Allen, enraged by Kanda revealing all of his secrets, finally breaks free of Wisely's control. He punches Kanda in the real world, knocking him back to his senses. However, the memories brought out by Wisely cause Alma to resurface as an Akuma and destroy the North American Branch. When Alma wakes up, Kanda confronts him.
111	8	"Awakening"; Transliteration: "Kakusei" (Japanese: 覚醒)	August 23, 2016
Using his Crow seals, Tokusa manages to save almost everyone from the explosion caused by Alma's awakening. However, he and all the Third Exorcists start turning into Akumas as a result of Alma's cells mutating due to her anger towards the Order. Allen's Innocence automatically activates to destroy Tokusa, but Allen refuses to kill him. Bak uses his spirit stone to seal Tokusa and summons Fo to hold off Tyki. Master Zu Mei Chan arrives and uses his golem, Atuuda, to heal the others' wounds. He tells Allen that only Kanda can save Alma. Allen tries to stop Kanda, who has lost control due to grief. Kanda is locked in a fight to the death with Alma. As the fight continues, Alma's regenerative powers diminish. Allen defends Alma, and as a result, Kanda turns on Allen. When Kanda stabs Allen with his Mugen, the 14th Noah reacts with hatred toward the Innocence, which begins to awaken, much to the Earl's delight.
112	9	"Little Goodbyes"; Transliteration: "Ritoru Gubbai" (Japanese: リトル・グッバイ)	August 30, 2016
Allen meets the 14th Noah, Nea, in his subconscious. However, the Mana Walker illusion awakens Allen's cursed left eye, causing him to regain consciousness. Timcanpy expands, activating a spell inside Allen and breaking the Earl's barrier upon the Branch. Allen sees Alma's Akuma soul and learns that Alma is the woman Kanda loved in his previous life. Alma self-destructs to prevent Kanda from learning this, but they are both still alive after the explosion. Kanda finally learns the truth. Allen then uses his Noah's Ark to transport Kanda and Alma to the secret underground chamber beneath Mater, where they can finally be free. Even after Alma's death, though, the Third Exorcists continue rampaging, and two of them are destroyed. Lavi and Bookman are kidnapped by the Noah Tryde, and Chaoji Han is seriously injured. As Allen tries to persuade Tokusa to resist his Akuma mutation, Link arrives with Tewaku and binds Allen with his seals.
113	10	"Sinner in Despair"; Transliteration: "Zetsubō no Zainin" (Japanese: 絶望の罪人)	September 6, 2016
The Third Exorcist, Tokusa, continues to mutate and attacks Allen. In order to protect Tokusa, Tewaku also mutates and tries to attack Allen, but is repelled by Timcanpy, who has grown huge. The Earl states that he will not allow the Order to break the rules by fighting with his own weapons. He and the Noah then leave with the remaining Third Exorcists. Allen and Timcanpy are shackled and imprisoned for helping Kanda and Alma escape. The Noah try to understand why the Earl was so affected by the 14th that he cried himself to sleep. Sheril holds Lavi hostage to force Bookman to reveal information about the 14th. Link reports the Noah attack to the Vatican, also stating that Allen is not eating and refuses to lead them to Kanda and Alma. Head chef Jerry tries to cheer up the Exorcists and scientists in the canteen by preparing a delicious feast, but they are more concerned about Allen. Link brings food to Allen in his cell and confides in him about the guilt he feels because of his past friendship with the Thirds and his role in their transformation. Just as a suspicious cardinal enters and promises to "heal" him, Allen starts turning into the 14th.
114	11	"The Hidden One"; Transliteration: "Kakusa Reta Mono" (Japanese: 隠されたもの)	September 13, 2016
Link tries to stop the Cardinal from attacking Allen but is easily defeated. Allen attacks the Cardinal with his Innocence and discovers that he is not only a non-human being, but also the person who fatally shot Cross Marian. Tyki, Road, and the Third Exorcists arrive under orders from the Earl to save Allen. Tyki reveals that the Cardinal is actually Apocryphos: a sentient innocence that exists solely to protect the Heart. The Noah have been searching for the Heart for 7,000 years. A fierce battle ensues between Apocryphos and Tyki. Meanwhile, the Exorcists and scientists ask Rouvelier and Komui Lee to free Allen, but they refuse. Apocryphos overpowers Tyki and tries to merge with Allen to stop the 14th, but Allen resists and is helped by Road and Link. Link frees Timcanpy and blows a hole in the prison wall so Allen can escape with the Noah. He is later punished by Apocryphos. The Pope revokes Allen's rights as an Exorcist, and Komui orders all Exorcists to capture him. Lenalee refuses to believe that Allen has betrayed them and chases after him.
115	12	"My Home"	September 20, 2016
The Black Order is dealing with the aftermath of Apocryphos's appearance. Over Link's mortally wounded body, Master Zu accuses Rouvelier of exploiting people within the Order for his own purposes. After escaping from Apocryphos, Allen and the Noah rest. Tyki questions Allen about his affiliation with the Order, as they have begun to treat him as a Noah. Allen and Tyki debate the methods used by each side in the conflict, accusing each other of using ruthless tactics. Meanwhile, the Exorcists try to reach Allen, but they are cornered by several Akuma backed up by the Thirds. Lenalee is also intercepted by the Thirds and Akuma. Despite this, Allen decides to remain an Exorcist, so Tyki leaves, and Road disappears shortly after. Allen prepares to leave the Order compound with a smaller Timcampy, using his Noah's Ark. Just then, Lenalee arrives and tells him that they will become enemies if he leaves. Nevertheless, Allen says he will remain an exorcist. After hugging her, he leaves.
116	13	"Walker"; Transliteration: "Wōkā" (Japanese: ウォーカー)	September 27, 2016
Many years ago, Cross Marian took the young Allen to a caretaker, knowing he would eventually become the 14th and disappear. Allen was traumatized after trying to revive his guardian, Mana, and accidentally turning him into an Akuma. Cross took care of Allen, who slowly recovered but began to behave like Mana. In the present day, Allen appears at her doorstep. Meanwhile, the Noah discuss the arrival of Apocryphos and its implications. Sheril has not managed to extract any information about the 14th from Bookman or Lavi, and he rages, unable to understand why Road protected Allen Walker. Three months later, the Exorcists and staff have mixed feelings about Allen's behavior and disappearance. Kanda returns to the Order, but he is unforgiving and rude to everyone. He makes peace with Zu, who regrets launching the Second Exorcist Project. When Kanda synchronizes with his Innocence, it transforms into a crystallized form, and he becomes an Exorcist again. He says that he only returned to redeem himself for awakening the 14th. Meanwhile, Allen begins fighting Akuma, who reacts to his transformation into the 14th. Whenever Nea, the 14th, starts to transform again, he remembers Mana's and Cross's words of encouragement. This enables him to remember his past as Allen Walker.

== Reception ==
D.Gray-man Hallow was ranked among the most anticipated anime series of summer 2016 by Anime News Network (ANN) readers and the Japanese web portal Goo. Alex Osborn of IGN appreciated the brief exposition in the sequel's first episode, which reminded viewers of the plot given that he had not watched the original anime for some time. Although he enjoyed the interaction among the main cast, Osborn was confused by the revelation that Allen would become the 14th Noah and had to rewatch the scene to understand it. In a later review, Osborn stated that he was amazed by Allen's first possession by the 14th Noah; although it was "disturbing", it enhanced the character's development. Anne Laurenroth of ANN remarked on Kanda's character development in Hallow, particularly his fight against Alma Karma and his return to the Order in the finale. Laurenroth noted Hallow's poor animation and pacing but observed that, although most of its episodes were grim, its final moments were upbeat. Thanasis Karavasilis of Manga Tokyo appreciated the black-and-white morality of the story when Allen was imprisoned by the Order he had been working for and had to rely on the Millennium Earl's comrades in order to survive. However, the reviewer felt that viewers needed more information than the story was able to provide.
