= Cross Marian =

Fictional character from D.Gray-man

- D.Gray-man character
- Cross Marian as seen in the first anime series
- First appearance: D.Gray-man chapter 2
- Created by: Katsura Hoshino
- Voiced by: Japanese; Hiroki Tōchi (D.Gray-man); Tsuguo Mogami (D.Gray-man Hallow); English; Christopher R. Sabat

Cross Marian (Japanese: クロス・マリアン, Hepburn: Kurosu Marian) is a fictional character who appears in Katsura Hoshino's manga D.Gray-man. Cross is an exorcist in charge of eliminating creatures known as Akumas alongside using the power of the Innocence. The abusive teacher of the series' main character, Allen Walker, Cross initially appears in flashbacks of the story that involve his poor treatment towards the young exorcist until he appears in an area known as Noah's Ark to save his student from a descendant of the Noah clan. Shortly afterwards, the reasons for Cross' disappearance are explained, as it is mentioned that he is associated with a former Noah, who is also connected with Allen. Outside the D.Gray-man manga and anime series, Cross has also appeared in a light novel prequel, which shows that he has been investigating Allen ever since the child worked in a circus.

Cross Marian was created by Hoshino, who noted that his importance within the storyline tends to create big impacts within the storyline and recurring characters, most notably Allen. However, Cross Marian's design gave Hoshino difficulties, owing to his large hair and the fact that the character always wears half of a mask. Cross Marian has been well-received by D.Gray-man's Japanese fanbase, often appearing in popularity polls from the series. Critical reception to Cross Marian has been generally positive due to his impact in the story and his complicated relationship with Allen.

== Creation and design ==
Manga author Katsura Hoshino had multiple ideas when deciding on the concept on how Cross Marian's design would expose his personality. As Hoshino wanted to give Cross a dark aura involving his lack of caring for others, she would give him a sloppily exorcist outfit. Eventually, she decided to instead give him a hat for his first appearances, clarifying that it meant to explain how Cross is an adult and can take care of himself. A scrapped idea of Cross involved him wearing more fashionable clothes including an umbrella that would turn into his weapon.

Hoshino described Cross as a character who is involved in multiple hardships due to knowing secret information that is revealed across the series. While initially a minor character, the reveal that Cross made a pact with the 14th Noah, Nea D. Campbell, changed the way she wrote him. As a result, when more information regarding Cross is revealed, the character lets its steam in a surprising way. Hoshino additionally stated that the character behaves on instinct. Furthermore, she believes the way Cross Marian moves might cause the surroundings to be "on fire" due to the information Cross Marian reveals.

While finding Cross initially hard to design based on his long hair, Hoshino finds his facial expressions easier to draw. A major difficulty in illustrating Cross comes from how the ends of hair curl up. Shedraw those curls by turning her wrist. As Cross' fate after being attacked was remained ambiguous, Hoshino stated a young Cross would appear in the future, once the truth about Noah Nea is revealed. Despite also noting the poor treatment Cross gives to Allen, Hoshino states Cross cares for his student, most notably whenever Allen misbehaves. Cross was voiced by Hiroki Tōchi in Japanese. Due to Cross appearing early in the series only in the form as flashbacks of Allen, Tōchi only worked with this area of the series. As a result, he wanted the first anime to expand in order to further portray his character once he made his introduction. He is voiced by Christopher Sabat in English.

== Appearances ==
Four years before the storyline and after receiving his orders, he ceased communication with the Black Order. However, recently, he is shown to have infiltrated the Noah's Ark. Cross is a demanding individual who is hard to please, is a heavy drinker, and has been described as a gambler and a womanizer by most. He is often covered in debts, which he would use Allen and the Noah Jasdevi to pay for him. Cross has the unique ability to convert Akuma and make them work under his orders.^{[ch. 75]} Before his suspected death, the 14th Noah told Cross to look after Mana Walker, as the 14th will return to him one day. During the main story, Cross often appears in flashbacks, most notably in Allen's due to his abusive treatment he gave to exorcist when training him. This traumatizes Allen in a comic relief fashion as he has to pay multiple debts from his teacher.

When the Black Order learns the Noah's descendants are targeting their strongest exorcists, known as "mariscals". In order to aid the Cross and other mariscals, the exorcists are sent to find them in Japan. However, the Noah Jasdevi loses him. Cross hides into an area known as Noah's Ark, until saving Allen and his friends from the berserker Noah Tyki Mikk. The only Exorcist to have control of two anti-Akuma weapons, Cross uses Judgment (断罪者, Jajjimento) as a revolver to weaken Tyki. Cross is also able to use magic to control the corpse of a female Exorcist named Maria, allowing him to use her Parasite-type anti-Akuma weapon. Her defensive ability uses her song to create illusions that can conceal the presence of others. When the Millennium Earl, the leader of the Noahs, rescues Tyki, Cross orders his student to repair the ark, much to his confusion. Allen manages to restore the Ark due to his body moving against his will. Shortly afterwards, Cross returns to the Black Order headquarters.

In the Black Order's new Headquarters, Cross is doubted by his superiors of the main reason for his disappearance. Malcolm C. Rouvelier deduces that Cross disappeared on purpose to meet a person simply known as the "14th" who is also related with Allen's ability to control the Ark. The Order is then invaded by an army of Akumas, which causes Cross to join forces with the other exorcists and mariscals to stop them. Although he is defeated by the evolved Level 4 Akuma, Cross manages to return to fight and defeat the Akuma alongside Allen and Lenalee Lee. Few months later, Cross reveals to Allen that his body is the vessel of the 14th Noah. Afterwards, Cross' body is seen covered in blood, but it disappears, leaving only a supporting message to his student through a golem known as Timcampy. Allen later learns that a sentient Innocence, Apocryphos, was involved in Cross's disappearance. Cross later appears in a sidestory chapter which shows how he treated for the younger traumatized Allen after his adoptive father was turned into an Akuma. He once again appears within Allen's mind when the 14th is taking over his student's body, and gives him the location of a woman who might tell her the truth behind the Noah.

Outside of the main series, Cross also appears in the light novel Lost Fragments of Snow, where he investigates Allen's life in a circus and briefly tells the child not to be involved with Mana, who still did not adopt him.

== Reception ==
Cross Marian was well received by manga readers of D.Gray-man in Japan, often appearing within the top ten in the character polls.

Critics for manga and anime have generally enjoyed Cross Marian's characterization and role in the story. The book Representing Multiculturalism in Comics and Graphic Novels noted that the character's name has a common element within the series, which is to add a coherent level of narrative, as seen in the multiple uses of "Cross"; D.Gray-man often makes use of symbolism in regards to Christian religion through its themes, and story. Manga News compared Cross Marian's debut in the manga as similar to the ones from the Bleach series by Tite Kubo, while finding him as one of the most overpowered characters in the story so far based on his fight against Tyki. Comic Book Bin enjoyed Cross' debut in the Noah's Ark, praising his battle against the Noah which he felt was illustrated well. Grant Goodman of Pop Culture Shock found the discussion between Cross Marian and Allen Walker in regards to the student being revealed as a Noah to the point it felt as intense as a fight scene. Anime News Network acclaimed how the search for Cross Marian was handled in the story; while during multiple episodes, the main characters go searching for him until he returns to the Order. Shortly, he is believed to have been killed due to the Hallow's first episode, ending with his body being covered with blood and then disappearing, much to the shock of the members from the cast despite Cross being noted as the strongest exorcist within the series. IGN enjoyed how Hallow allowed to explore the relationship between Cross Marian and Allen, despite some confusing moments in regards to how their discussion is handled. Like Anime News Network, the cliffhanger involving Cross' apparent death made the IGN reviewer excited more how the story would be later explored.

In a latter review by IGN, Cross Marian's death was noted to have a major impact on Allen, but criticized the shift of tone due to the story jumping to another arc rather than exploring Cross Marian's death. Manga Tokyo instead liked the handling of this revelation as Cross' death remains as a mystery most possibly done by a character within the Black Order rather than the series' antagonists, the Noah. Although Cross Marian does not appear in following episodes, reviewers liked his background and relationship explored in the series' finale. Anne Lauenroth wrote that while the character might have been dead, Cross Marian's words and care give Allen a "path" during darker and solo journey now that Allen has left the Order and is fighting his inner Noah. Manga Tokyo was amazed by Cross Marian's characterization in the finale; despite initially been seen as a person who dislikes his student, the way Cross treated the young and traumatized in the flashbacks left the complete opposite impression on the reviewer, due to how the General treated Allen during his darkest days.
