= Travis Willingham =

American voice actor

- Willingham at GalaxyCon Des Moines in 2026
- Born: Dallas, Texas, U.S.
- Occupations: Voice actor, chief executive officer (CEO)
- Years active: 2000–present
- Spouse: Laura Bailey (m. 2011)
- Children: 1
- Website: www.traviswillingham.com

Travis Willingham is an American voice actor known for his character portrayals in video games and English anime dubs. His notable roles include Roy Mustang in the Fullmetal Alchemist franchise, Cleo in Glass Fleet, Ginko in Mushishi, Portgas D. Ace in One Piece, Takashi "Mori" Morinozuka in Ouran High School Host Club, Yu Kanda in D. Gray-man, and Cameron Campbell in Camp Camp.

Willingham's video game roles include Guile in the Street Fighter franchise, Knuckles the Echidna in the Sonic the Hedgehog franchise from 2010 to his resignation in 2018, Thor in various Marvel productions, and Isaac Frost in Fight Night Champion. He has been a cast member of the web series Critical Role since 2015, in which he and other voice actors play Dungeons & Dragons. He co-founded the production company Critical Role Productions, for which he has been chief executive officer (CEO) since 2019.

== Early life ==
Travis Willingham was born in Dallas. He has a brother named Carson. He became interested in acting in fifth grade. After sixth grade, he moved from a private school to J.L. Long Middle School. He later graduated from Woodrow Wilson High School, and studied at Texas Christian University.

== Career ==
Willingham learned that the English dub of Dragon Ball Z was being recorded in Dallas, and asked Laura Bailey, who he knew through their talent agency, to "put in a good word for him". A director there asked him to audition for the part of Roy Mustang in Fullmetal Alchemist, and he received the role. While he described it as "the most intensive, spirit-crushing time ever in voiceover", it ultimately led to his rise to prominence in the industry. He later reprised the role in Fullmetal Alchemist: Brotherhood.

After moving to Los Angeles, Willingham attempted to pursue a career in acting but fared poorly due to his tall height (6 ft 4in). He returned to voice acting at the suggestion of his agent; Willingham had been unaware that so much voice work was recorded in the city. He went on to perform in a number of notable roles including Yu Kanda in D.Gray-man, Cleo in Glass Fleet, Ginko in Mushishi, Portgas D. Ace in the Funimation re-dub of One Piece and Takashi Morinozuka in Ouran High School Host Club. He also voices Thor in several Marvel projects and King Roland II in Disney Junior's Sofia the First. From 2010 to 2018, he was the voice of Knuckles the Echidna in the Sonic the Hedgehog series.

Willingham is also a main cast member of the popular Dungeons & Dragons web series Critical Role, where he played Grog in the first campaign, Fjord in the second campaign, and a dual role as Sir Bertrand Bell and Chetney Pock O'Pea in the third campaign. He currently plays Teor Pridesire in Campaign 4. Critical Role was both the Webby Winner and the People's Voice Winner in the "Games (Video Series & Channels)" category at the 2019 Webby Awards; the show was also both a Finalist and the Audience Honor Winner at the 2019 Shorty Awards. After becoming hugely successful, the Critical Role cast left the Geek & Sundry network in early 2019 and set up their own production company called Critical Role Productions, for which Willingham is CEO. Soon after, they aimed to raise $750,000 on Kickstarter to create an animated series of their first campaign, but ended up raising over $11 million. In November 2019, Amazon Prime Video announced that they had acquired the streaming rights to this animated series, now titled The Legend of Vox Machina; Willingham reprised his role as Grog.

== Personal life ==
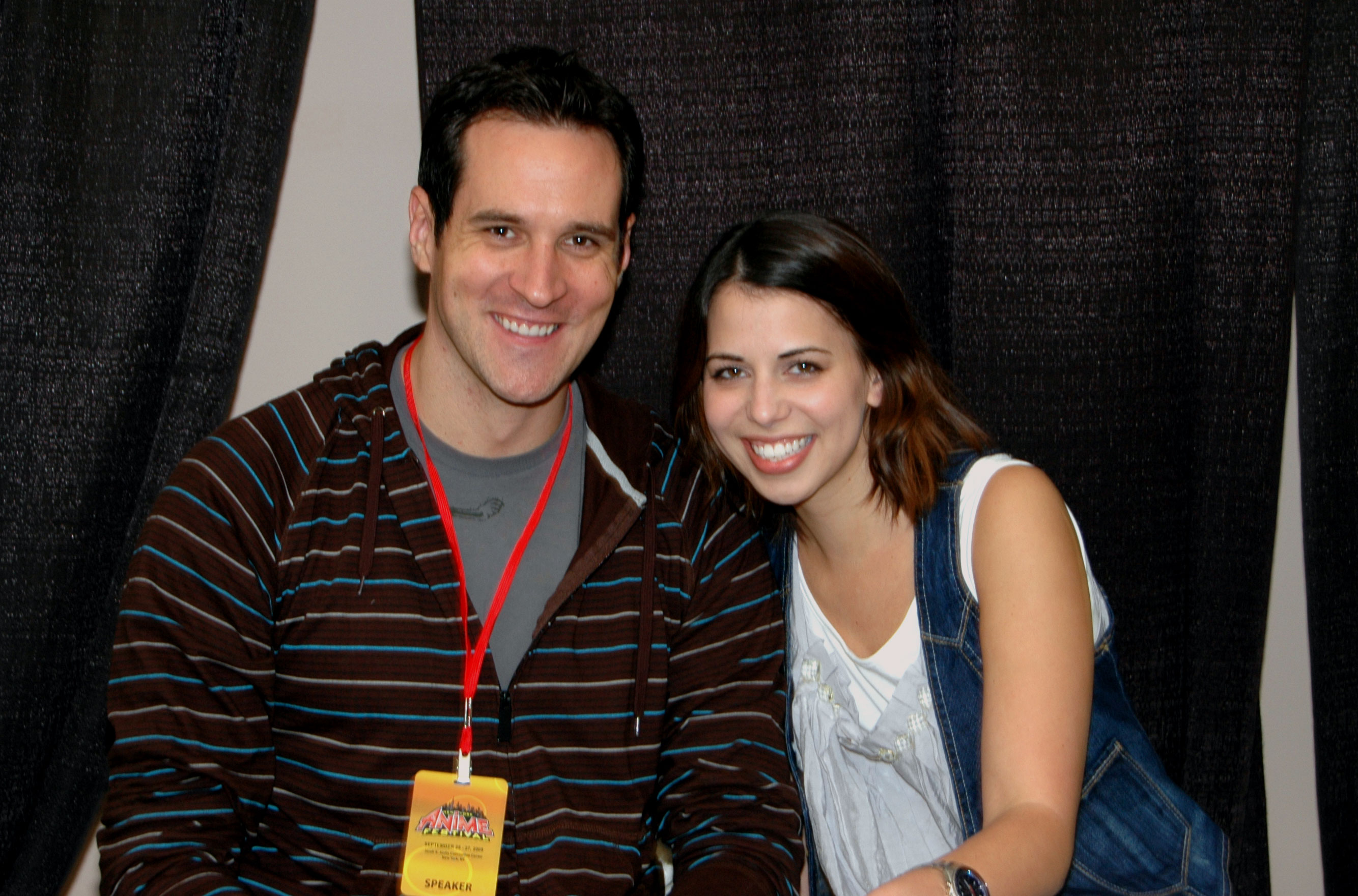
Laura Bailey and Willingham in September 2009

On September 25, 2011, Willingham married voice actress Laura Bailey in Camarillo, California. They currently reside in Los Angeles and have a son named Ronin (b. 2018).

Willingham is a lifelong fan of the Dallas Cowboys. Willingham has ADHD.

== Filmography ==
=== Voice acting ===
==== Anime ====
List of voice performances in anime
Year	Title	Role	Notes	Source
2001–03	Dragon Ball Z	Various		Resume
2002–06	Yu Yu Hakusho: Ghost Files	Mitsunari Yanagisawa, Touou		Resume
2004	Kiddy Grade	Various		CA
2004	Case Closed	Various		CA
2004	Dragon Ball GT: A Hero's Legacy	Guard	Special	
2004–06	Fullmetal Alchemist	Roy Mustang		
2005	Mermaid Forest	Young Eijiro, Man in Black Suit		CA
2005	Daphne in the Brilliant Blue	Wilfred Kim		CA
2006	Gun Sword	Kaiji	Eps. 10, 26	CA
2006	Ergo Proxy	Iggy		CA, Resume
2006–08	Crayon Shin-chan	Phantom Scarecrow	Funimation dub	Resume
2007	Mushishi	Ginko		
2007	Glass Fleet	Cleo Aiolos Corbeille de Veil		CA
2007–08	School Rumble series	Masakazu Tougou, others		CA
2007–08	Digimon Data Squad	Boomer, Tortomon		
2007–12	Hellsing Ultimate	Wild Geese Adjustant, Wild Geese Deputy	OVA series Eps. 3–4, 6	
2007–10, 2014–16	One Piece	Portgas D. Ace	Funimation dub	
2008	Black Blood Brothers	Badrick Serihan		Resume
2008	Genesis of Aquarion	Pierre Vieira		Resume
2008	Shuffle!	Eustoma (King of Gods)		CA
2008	Ghost Hunt	Houshou Takigawa		
2008–09	Naruto	Hachidai, Henchman (Eps. 152–153), Seimei, Yotaka		
2008–09	Code Geass: Lelouch of the Rebellion	Andreas Darlton, Otaku (Ep. 18), Worker (Ep. 9)		
2008–09	Ouran High School Host Club	Takashi Morinozuka		
2009	Street Fighter IV: The Ties That Bind	Guile	OVA	Resume
2009	Kenichi: The Mightiest Disciple	Loki, Disciple #2		Resume
2009	D.Gray-man	Yu Kanda		Press
2009	The Tower of Druaga series	Neeba		
2009	Blassreiter	Hermann Salza		
2009–10	Monster	Christof Sievernich, Eva's Gardener		
2009–14	Bleach	Kugo Ginjo, Ashido		Resume
2009–19	Naruto: Shippuden	Zetsu, Jugo, Fudo, Various		Resume
2010	Soul Eater	Free		
2010	Kekkaishi	Toshimori's Teacher, Tokimori Hazama		
2010–11	Vampire Knight series	Toga Yagari	Also Guilty	Resume
2010–12	Fullmetal Alchemist: Brotherhood	Roy Mustang	Also OVAs	Resume
2011	Marvel Anime: Iron Man	Nagato Sakurai / Ramon Zero		Resume
2011	Marvel Anime: Wolverine	Yakuza	Ep. 2	Resume
2011–12	Marvel Anime: X-Men	Jun Sanada, Jason Wyngarde / Mastermind		Resume
2012–13	Tiger & Bunny	Antonio Lopez / Rock Bison		
2013	Digimon Fusion	Knightmon, Vilemon, Angemon, Musymon, Karatenmon		
2015	BlazBlue Alter Memory	Relius Clover		
2016	Sengoku Basara: End of Judgement	Katakura Kojuro		

==== Animation ====
Key
†	Denotes television productions that have not yet been released

List of voice performances in animation
Year	Title	Role	Notes	Source
2009–11	The Super Hero Squad Show	Hulk, Human Torch, Grey Hulk, Hans, Executioner, Piledriver, Hyperion, Zeus, others		
2010	G.I. Joe: Renegades	Sully, additional voices		
2011	Boing: The Play Ranger	Bing Bing, Mayor, DJ Frills & Thrills, Flipper		
2012	The Legend of Korra	Additional voices		
2012–15	Ultimate Spider-Man	Thor, Skurge, Wodin		
2012–18	Sofia the First	King Roland II		
2013	Phineas and Ferb	Thor	Episode: "Phineas and Ferb: Mission Marvel"	
2013	Lego Marvel Super Heroes: Maximum Overload	Thor	Television special	
2013–15	Hulk and the Agents of S.M.A.S.H.	Thor, Frost Giant Commander		
2013–19	Avengers Assemble	Thor, Space Phantom, Bulldozer, Trick Shot, additional voices		
2014–15	Regular Show	Stash, Rich Steve, others		
2014–17	Sonic Boom	Knuckles the Echidna, Soar the Eagle		
2015	DC Super Friends	Lex Luthor		
2015	Lego Marvel Super Heroes: Avengers Reassembled	Thor, Yellowjacket	Television special	
2015	Marvel Super Hero Adventures: Frost Fight!	Thor		
2016–17	Guardians of the Galaxy	Thor, Hogun, additional voices		
2016–19	Camp Camp	Cameron Campbell	Web series	
2016–21	Ben 10	Cannonbolt, Sydney, Tim Buktu, Kraab, additional voices		
2017	Billy Dilley's Super-Duper Subterranean Summer	Zartran		
2017	Transformers: Robots in Disguise	Motormaster, Menasor		
2017	Lego Marvel Super Heroes - Guardians of the Galaxy: The Thanos Threat	Thor, Taserface		
2017	Be Cool, Scooby-Doo!	Dorbin	Episode: "American Goth"	
2017	Justice League Action	Bizarro	Episode: "Boo-ray for Bizarro"	
2017–20	Spider-Man	Sandman, Thor		
2018	Lego Marvel Super Heroes: Black Panther - Trouble in Wakanda	Thor		
2018–19	Elena of Avalor	Cuco	3 episodes	
2019–21	Fast & Furious Spy Racers	Additional Voices		
2022–present	The Legend of Vox Machina	Grog Strongjaw, Additional voices	Also writer and executive producer	
2023	Lego Marvel Avengers: Code Red	Thor, Wendigos	Disney+ television special	
2024	X-Men '97	Sebastian Shaw	Episode: "Remember It"	
2024	Lego Marvel Avengers: Mission Demolition	Thor	Disney+ television special	
2025	Your Friendly Neighborhood Spider-Man	Rhino, Thaddeus "Thunderbolt" Ross	2 episodes	
2025	Lego Marvel Avengers: Strange Tails	Thor	Disney+ television special	
2025–present	The Mighty Nein	Fjord Stone, Additional voices	also writer and executive producer	
2026	Sofia the First: Royal Magic	King Roland II		

==== Film ====
List of voice performances in direct-to-video, feature and television films
Year	Title	Role	Notes	Source
2004	Blue Gender: The Warrior	Control Operator A	Compilation film	CA
2005	Dragon Ball Z: Broly Second Coming	Villager E		CA
2006	Fullmetal Alchemist: The Conqueror of Shamballa	Roy Mustang		CA
2008	Vexille	Cdr. Leon Fayden		
2012	Fullmetal Alchemist: The Sacred Star of Milos	Roy Mustang		
2012	Little Big Panda	Brutus	As Kent Hampton	
2013	Mass Effect: Paragon Lost	Captain Toni		
2013	Sengoku Basara: The Last Party	Katakura Kojuro		
2013	Scooby-Doo! Stage Fright	Waldo		
2014	Batman: Assault on Arkham	Morgue Guy		
2014	JLA Adventures: Trapped in Time	Gorilla Grodd		
2015	Tiger and Bunny: The Rising	Antonio Lopez / Rock Bison		
2016	Batman: Bad Blood	Heretic		
2017	Transformers: The Last Knight	Knight of Iacon	Uncredited	
2019	Code Geass: Lelouch of the Re;surrection	Zuee		
2019	Scooby-Doo! Return to Zombie Island	Seaver		
2020	Superman: Red Son	Superior Man, Guy Gardner, Petrovich		
2020	Ben 10 Versus the Universe: The Movie	Cannonbolt		
2022	Batman and Superman: Battle of the Super Sons	Clark Kent / Superman		
2023	Justice League X RWBY: Super Heroes and Huntsmen, Part Two	Clark Kent / Superman, Weather Wizard		

==== Video games ====
Key
†	Denotes television productions that have not yet been released

List of voice performances in video games
Year	Title	Role	Notes	Source
2005	Fullmetal Alchemist 2: Curse of the Crimson Elixir	Roy Mustang		Resume
2005	Fullmetal Alchemist and the Broken Angel	Roy Mustang		Resume
2006	Valkyrie Profile 2: Silmeria	Woltar, Alm, Adonis, Aegis, Gabriel Celeste		CA
2007	Dawn of Mana	Stroud		
2008	Dynasty Warriors 6	Xu Huang, Zhou Tai		Resume
2008	One Piece: Unlimited Adventure	Portgas D. Ace		Resume
2008	The World Ends with You	Yodai Higashizawa		
2008	Tales of Vesperia	Clint		
2008	Armored Core: For Answer	Additional voices		CA
2008	Resistance 2	Black Ops Soldier		Resume
2009	Street Fighter IV	Guile		
2009	Star Ocean: The Last Hope	Bacchus D-79		Resume
2009	Halo Wars	Elite Honor Guard Unit		Resume
2009	Ghostbusters: The Video Game	Additional Voice Talent		Resume
2009	Magna Carta 2	Raud		
2009	Marvel Super Hero Squad	Hulk, Grey Hulk, Red Hulk		Resume
2009	League of Legends	Azir, Talon		
2009	Dragon Ball: Raging Blast	Cell		
2010	Final Fantasy XIII	Cocoon Inhabitants		
2010	Trauma Team	Gabriel Cunningham		Resume
2010	Transformers: War for Cybertron	Sideswipe		
2010	Super Street Fighter IV	Guile		
2010	Valkyria Chronicles II	Narrator, Hubert Brixham		
2010	Sengoku Basara: Samurai Heroes	Kojuro Katakura		
2010	Dragon Ball Z: Tenkaichi Tag Team	Cell		
2010	Dragon Ball: Raging Blast 2	Cell		
2010	Call of Duty: Black Ops	Sergei		Resume
2010	Marvel Super Hero Squad: The Infinity Gauntlet	Hulk		
2010	Sonic Free Riders	Knuckles the Echidna, Storm the Albatross		Resume
2010	Naruto Shippûden: Ultimate Ninja Heroes 3	Jugo		
2010	Sonic Colors	Knuckles the Echidna	DS version only	Resume
2010	Naruto Shippûden: Ultimate Ninja Storm 2	Jugo		
2010	Naruto Shippûden: Dragon Blade Chronicles	Jugo		
2011	Fight Night Champion	Isaac Frost		Resume
2011	Dragon Ball Z: Ultimate Tenkaichi	Cell		
2011	Battlefield 3	Ralph Pogosian		Resume
2011	Saints Row: The Third	Pedestrians		Resume
2011	Catherine	Jonathan "Jonny" Ariga		
2011	Naruto Shippûden: Kazuna Drive	Jugo		
2011	Transformers: Dark of the Moon	Stratosphere		Resume
2011	Naruto Shippûden: Ultimate Ninja Impact	Jugo, Zetsu		
2011	Sonic Generations	Knuckles the Echidna		Resume
2011	Mario & Sonic at the London 2012 Olympic Games	Knuckles the Echidna		Resume
2012	Binary Domain	Dan Marshall		
2012	Armored Core V	Leon, City Police AC, AC Pilot		
2012	Halo 4	Jul 'Mdama		
2012	Call of Duty: Black Ops II	Multiplayer, Additional voices		
2012	Lego Batman 2: DC Super Heroes	Superman		Tweet
2012	Naruto Shippûden: Ultimate Ninja Storm Generations	Jugo		
2012	Street Fighter x Tekken	Guile		
2012	Transformers: Fall of Cybertron	Sideswipe, Onslaught, Slug, Hot Shot		
2012	Sonic & All-Stars Racing Transformed	Knuckles the Echidna		Resume
2012	World of Warcraft: Mists of Pandaria	Rell Nightwind, Rivett Clutchpop, Grizzle Gearslip		
2012	Resident Evil 6	BSAA		
2012	Dragon Ball Z: For Kinect	Cell		
2013	Gears of War: Judgment	COG Sergeant, Onyx Officer		
2013	Metro: Last Light	English Voice Talent		
2013	Naruto Shippûden: Ultimate Ninja Storm 3	Jugo, Zetsu		
2013	The Last of Us	Additional Voices		
2013	Sonic Lost World	Knuckles the Echidna, Zavok		Resume
2013–15	Disney Infinity series	Thor	Grouped under "Featuring the Voice Talents of"	
2013	Grand Theft Auto V	The Local Population		
2013	Aliens: Colonial Marines	O'Neal		
2013	Mario & Sonic at the Sochi 2014 Olympic Winter Games	Knuckles the Echidna		
2013	Fuse	Raven Guard, Grigori		
2013	Killer Is Dead	Hamada-Yama, Damon		
2013	Metal Gear Rising: Revengeance	Dolzaev		
2013	Thor: The Dark World	Thor	iOS app	
2013	Ratchet & Clank: Into the Nexus	Weapon Grummel		
2013	Lego Marvel Super Heroes	Thor, Mastermind, Sabretooth, Dormammu, Star-Lord		
2014	Dragon Ball Z: Battle of Z	Cell		
2014	Middle-earth: Shadow of Mordor	Hirgon		
2012–16	Skylanders series	Doom Stone, Eye-Brawl, Buzz, Fist Bump, Fisticuffs	Grouped under "Voice Actors"	
2014	Lego Batman 3: Beyond Gotham	Superman, Hawkman, Booster Gold, King Shark, Darkseid		
2014	World of Warcraft: Warlords of Draenor	Gazlowe		
2014	Far Cry 4	Paul "De Pleur" Harmon		
2014	Infamous First Light	Shane		
2014	Infamous Second Son	Reggie Rowe		
2014	Sonic Boom: Shattered Crystal	Knuckles the Echidna		Resume
2014	Sonic Boom: Rise of Lyric	Knuckles the Echidna		Resume
2014	Knack	Ryder		
2014	Naruto Shippûden: Ultimate Ninja Storm Revolution	Jugo, Zetsu		
2014	Ultra Street Fighter IV	Guile		
2014	Spider-Man Unlimited	Flint Marko / Sandman, Jack O'Lantern, Morlun		
2014	Transformers: Rise of the Dark Spark	Onslaught, Sideswipe		
2015	Saints Row: Gat out of Hell	Satan		
2015	Battlefield Hardline	Carl Stoddard		
2015	Final Fantasy Type-0 HD	Ryid Uruk		
2015	Infinite Crisis	Mecha Superman		
2015	Heroes of the Storm	Gazlowe		
2015	Mad Max	Scabrous Scrotus		
2015	Halo 5: Guardians	Frederic-104, Jul 'Mdama	Credited under "Main Voice & Performance Cast"; Credited under "Motion Capture Actors"	Resume
2015	StarCraft II: Legacy of the Void	Karax, Dragoon		
2015–16	Lego Dimensions			
2016	Street Fighter V	Guile		
2016	Marvel Heroes	Green Goblin		
2016	Ratchet & Clank	Grimroth, Gadgetron Vendor		
2016	Batman: The Telltale Series	Harvey Dent / Two-Face		
2016	Dungeons & Dragons Online	Dungeon Master	Scourge of the Slave Lords pack	
2016	Naruto Shippûden: Ultimate Ninja Storm 4	Jugo, Zetsu		
2016	World of Warcraft: Legion	Turalyon, Kur'talos Ravencrest		
2016	Mario & Sonic at the Rio 2016 Olympic Games	Knuckles the Echidna, Zavok		Resume
2017	Kingdom Hearts HD 2.8 Final Chapter Prologue	Aced	Kingdom Hearts χ Backcover movie	
2017	Fire Emblem Heroes	Ogma, Lon'qu, Camus		
2017	Sonic Forces	Knuckles the Echidna, Zavok		Resume (final role for Zavok)
2017	Marvel vs. Capcom: Infinite	Thor		
2018	Pillars of Eternity II: Deadfire	Tekēhu, Grog Strongjaw		
2018	World of Warcraft: Battle for Azeroth	Turalyon, Gazlowe		
2018	Marvel's Spider-Man	Wilson Fisk / Kingpin, additional voices	Also motion capture	
2018	Middle-earth: Shadow of War	Castamir		
2018	Super Smash Bros. Ultimate	Knuckles the Echidna, Guile	Archive audio	Resume
2018	Lego DC Super-Villains	Superman, Hawkman, Booster Gold, Metallo, Ultra-Humanite, Talon, Etrigan the Demon, Eradicator, General Zod		
2019	Kingdom Hearts III	Aced		
2019	Magic: The Gathering Arena	Gideon Jura		
2019	Star Wars Jedi: Fallen Order	Jaro Tapal		
2020	Kingdom Hearts III Re:Mind	Aced	Archive footage	
2020	The Last of Us Part II	Large Rattler	Also motion capture	
2020	Final Fantasy VII Remake	Additional voices		
2020	Marvel's Avengers	Thor		
2020	Marvel's Spider-Man: Miles Morales	Wilson Fisk / Kingpin, additional voices	Also motion capture	
2021	Psychonauts 2	EKG Patient, Old Patient		
2023	Mortal Kombat 1	Alternate Timeline Raiden		
2023	Mortal Kombat: Onslaught	Raiden		Tweet
2024	Marvel Rivals	Thor, Doctor Doom		
2025	Date Everything!	Luke Nuke'm		
2025	Dead Take	Harry Dufresne		
2025	Trails in the Sky 1st Chapter	Lt. Lorence Belgar, additional voices		
2025	Dispatch	Phenomaman		
2027	Final Fantasy VII Revelation †	Sephiroth	Taking over the role from Tyler Hoechlin in Remake and Rebirth	

==== Audiobooks ====
List of voice performances in Audio books
Year	Title	Role	Notes	Source
2022	Critical Role: The Mighty Nein – The Nine Eyes of Lucien	Fjord Stone		
2025	Critical Role: Vox Machina - Stories Untold	Narrator		
2026	Critical Role: Mighty Nein - Stories Untold	Narrator		
2026	Halo: The Fall of Reach (Full Cast Dramatized Adaptation)	Fred-104, Michael Stanforth		

=== Live-action ===
==== Film ====
List of acting performances in films
Year	Title	Role	Notes	Source
2003	Secondhand Lions	Hood		Resume
2003	Prison-A-Go-Go!	Dr. Hurtrider		Resume
2006	The Guardian	Travis Finley		Resume
2009	A Perfect Getaway	Tommy		Resume
2016	The Phoenix Incident	Mitch Adams		

==== Television ====
List of acting performances on television
Year	Title	Role	Notes	Source
2008	Cold Case	Uniform Cop '64	Episode: "Wednesday's Women"	Resume
2009	Nip/Tuck	Big Jane	Episode: "Briggitte Reinholt"	Resume

==== Web series ====
List of acting performances in web series
Year	Title	Role	Notes	Source
2011–13	Shelf Life	Hero Man	43 episodes	
2015–present	Critical Role (campaign 1)	Grog Strongjaw	Cast member Creator-owned actual play web series	
2015–present	Critical Role (campaign 2)	Fjord Stone	Cast member Creator-owned actual play web series	
2015–present	Critical Role (campaign 3)	Sir Bertrand Bell, Chetney Pock O' Pea	Cast member Creator-owned actual play web series	
2015–present	Critical Role (campaign 4)	Teor Pridesire	Cast member Creator-owned actual play web series	
2016–21	Talks Machina	Himself	61 episodes	
2019	Travis Willingham's Yeehaw Game Ranch	Himself (host)	18 episodes	
2019	UnDeadwood	Reverend Mason	4 episodes	
2022–2024	4-Sided Dive	Himself	4 episodes	
2022	Exandria Unlimited: Calamity	Cerrit Agrupnin	5 episodes	
2023	Candela Obscura	Nathaniel Trapp	3 episodes	
2025	Age of Umbra	Idyl	Actual play limited series using the Daggerheart system	
