= Yu Kanda =

Fictional character from D.Gray-man

- D.Gray-man character
- Yu Kanda wielding Mugen as drawn by Katsura Hoshino (Note: This illustration meant to symbolize Kanda as a puppet of fate and how he cannot find the woman he loves.)
- First appearance: D.Gray-man manga chapter 5 (2004)
- Created by: Katsura Hoshino
- Voiced by: Japanese; Takahiro Sakurai; Takuya Satō (Hallow); Tsubasa Yonaga (Hallow, young self); English; Travis Willingham; Ian Sinclair (2nd voice)

Yu Kanda (Japanese: 神田 ユウ, Hepburn: Kanda Yū) is a character from D.Gray-man, a manga series created by Japanese artist and writer Katsura Hoshino. Kanda is a young adult who is an exorcist from an organization known as the Black Order. Like the other exorcists in the order, he is in charge of destroying demonic enemies known as Akuma, created by a man known as the Millennium Earl. For this, he uses an object referred to as "Innocence" sealed within a Japanese sword. Kanda sides with the Black Order in their fight against the Earl's group, the Noah Family. Kanda is often cold and antisocial toward his allies, even disliking it when people refer to him by his given name, Yu. He often engages in fights with his frequent ally, the series' protagonist Allen Walker. As the series proceeds, it is revealed he is the result of an experiment from the Black Order that created his artificial body and merged it with the brain of a deceased exorcist. Outside the main series and the two anime adaptations, Kanda has also appeared in the D.Gray-man light novels, the two video games of the series, and the crossover game Jump Ultimate Stars.

The character was created to bring a change to the series' predominant Western setting, with his design being based on the samurai of feudal Japan. Hoshino found Kanda's physical attractiveness difficult to illustrate; with many details to consider, she concentrated particularly on his eyes and hair. Due to the draft for his original backstory having multiple plot holes, Hoshino rewrote it. In the official one, Hoshino created Kanda's first friend, Alma Karma, who plays a major impact in his backstory and growth across the manga. Various voice actors have been employed for the character, in both the original Japanese and the English dubbed version.

Kanda has been popular with the series' readers, often appearing in top-ten lists of character polls and taking first place twice, much to Hoshino's surprise. He has also appeared in other polls focused on anime characters in general. Merchandise based on him has also been released. His appearances in the manga and anime series have been met with mixed reactions as result of Kanda's antisocial qualities, comparable with those seen in other series that have similar characters. On the other hand, his character development, specifically his relationship with Alma, his dynamic with Allen, and his backstory have earned Kanda praise. Response to Kanda's voice actors has also been both positive and negative.

== Creation and design ==
Early sketches of Kanda that featured him with different clothes and hairstyles

The character of Yu Kanda was carried over from an unpublished work created by Katsura Hoshino, who designed Kanda to introduce a change into D.Gray-man's Western setting.^{[vol. 8:140]} Kanda's design "came out very naturally" according to her, because in her early manga, before she became a full-time writer, she frequently drew boys with Japanese swords. She liked young samurais, such as Okita Sōji of the Shinsengumi special police forces; this influenced her designs for Kanda. He wears a long coat, and though series' protagonist Allen Walker wore a similar coat, Hoshino felt that the design better suited Kanda's defensive personality; the long coat became Kanda's "trademark" Black Order outfit. Multiple hairstyles and character designs' were also considered by Hoshino before she chose the final version. Hoshino has said that she found Kanda difficult to illustrate due to his sex appeal.^{[vol. 2:24]} Ever since his introduction, Kanda made few appearances until the tenth volume. In the release of this volume, Hoshino joked about how she missed Kanda. In response, within the manga Kanda impaled Hoshino's own character avatar, claiming that Hoshino did not know how to illustrate him well, so that Kanda made few appearances in the series' beginning.^{[vol. 10:204]}

Hoshino derived Kanda's surname from mitoshiro (御戸代), or kanda (神田), a rice paddy from which rice is offered to the gods. This is further addressed in volume twenty of the manga, which shows how Kanda was created in the "Mitoshiro World" during the Black Order's experiments to have more "Apostles of God". In the backstory, the designs for Kanda and his best friend, Alma Karma, contrasted with each other, Kanda retaining his feminine looks while Alma was presented as more masculine. The original basis for Kanda's feminine looks is that he was the reincarnation of a woman he was seeking. When this idea was changed (Karma, rather than Kanda himself, becomes the reincarnation of the woman), Kanda retained his androgynous look. When drawing Kanda, Hoshino pays more attention to the way she draws his hair and eyes, believing that the latter indicate the character's mood, that he "speaks with his eyes". Hoshino said that she took more care in drawing the highlights in Kanda's hair than she did with Lenalee Lee, another character with long hair. She noted that Kanda's early design featured large eyes because she had difficulty drawing finer eyes.

=== Personality and voice actors ===
Kanda is well known in the series for his antisocial personality, which often resulted in readers asking the author about him. In one fan letter, it was asked if Kanda was well meaning on the inside, the main characters found it unrealistic.^{[vol. 14:18]} In another question, a fan wonders if Hoshino gave him the first name "Yu" due to its similarities with Japanese words that resemble "The one who cannot read the atmosphere". Though Hoshino denied this, she admitted that Kanda can not read the atmosphere. While the characters deny that, the manga author confirmed that Kanda suffers from lack of tact.^{[vol. 14:36]} Hoshino referred to Kanda as the least intelligent protagonist in the series.^{[vol. 3:106]}

Once Alma Karma's story arc finished in the series, Hoshino was able to finish Kanda's backstory, which she had promised to the manga's readers. It was originally very different and had too many inconsistencies. When the series was moved to a monthly serialization rather than weekly, Hoshino had rewritten Kanda's backstory. Once new prominent characters were introduced in the series, Hoshino felt that it was possible to tell Kanda and Alma's story. During this story's end, Allen sends both of them to the town of Martel for the two of them to gain their freedom. This town was the first one Allen and Kanda visited while working for the Order. She chose this place because Kanda and Alma's relationship overlapped with that of Guzol and Lala, two characters who had a romantic relationship.

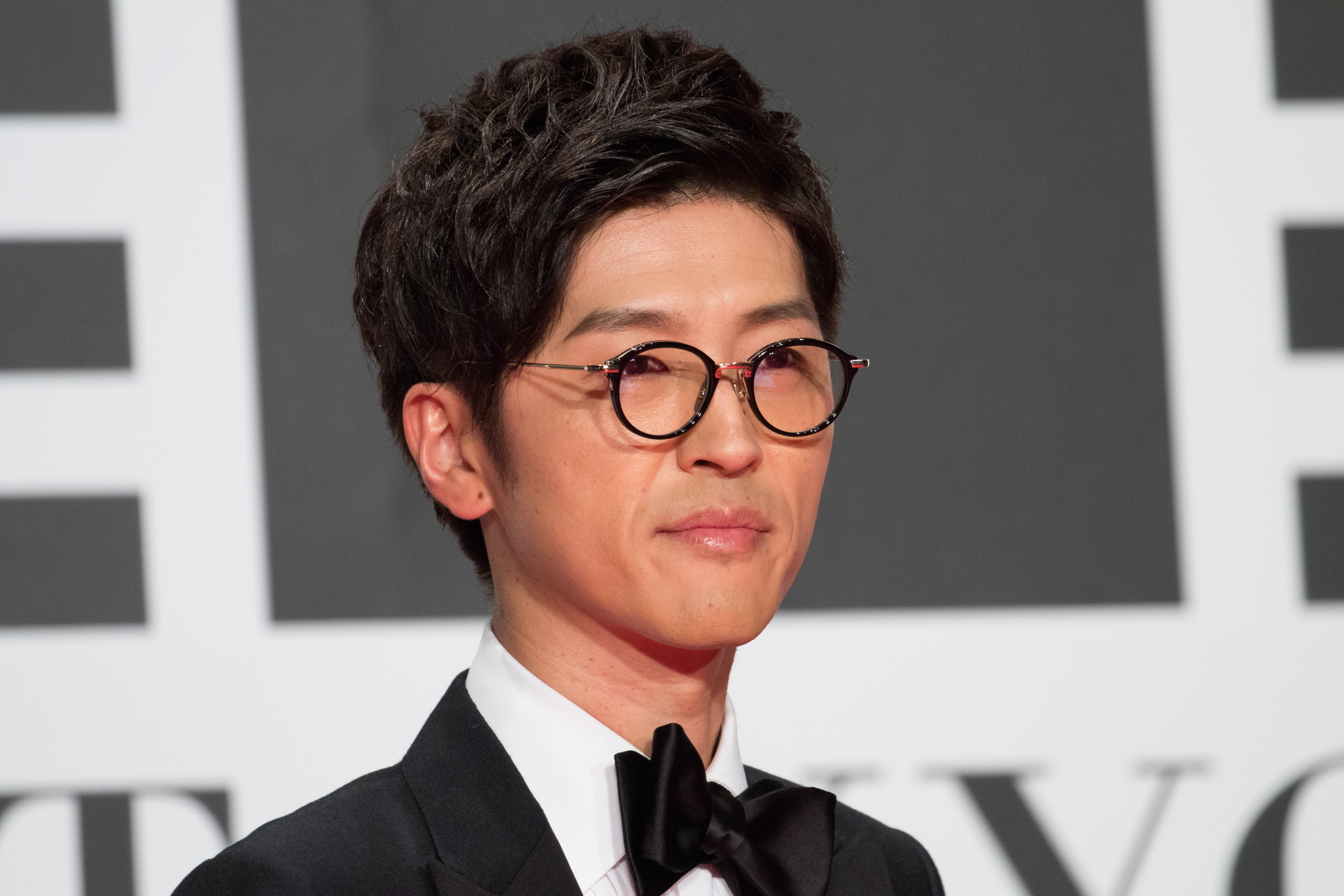
Takahiro Sakurai's work as Kanda's Japanese voice actor in the first anime earned praised from manga artist Katsura Hoshino^{[vol. 9:187]}

In an interview about this story arc, Hoshino explained why Kanda hates being called by his first name, saying that he did not have a last name when he was younger. During this time he was simply called Yu (ユウ, Yū) by the scientists of the Asian Headquarters of the Black Order and by his only friend, Karma. After being forced to kill Karma, Yu was given the surname Kanda by the character of Froi Tedoll, who acts like a fatherly figure to him. Once the arc finishes, Hoshino wanted to establish Kanda as having stayed on good terms with Allen, even though the two characters often clashed in previous chapters. As a result, she hinted to readers that the character would be back to help Allen, who had been put in a troubled situation after helping Kanda and Karma escape from the Black Order. She noted that as a result of this, Kanda became an easier character to write.

Across the series, Kanda sees illusions of lotus flowers, but Hoshino says this holds no particular meaning for him. The flowers were actually seen during Kanda's previous life. For Kanda, seeing the lotus sinking in dirt would mean his death. The illusion also appeared the first time Kanda nearly killed Karma, and he began to think it was a curse. For the flashbacks, Kanda's first meeting with his future comrade, Noise Marie, was shortened. The original idea was for Kanda to see the corpses of all the people taking care of him. However, Hoshino thought this scene would be too horrific and removed it. Instead, in the official release of the series, Kanda finds most of the scientists' corpses alongside Alma.

In the animated version of D.Gray-man, Kanda was voiced by Takahiro Sakurai. Hoshino was impressed by the delivery of his lines when first seeing him while working in the making of the series.^{[vol. 9:187]} Sakurai regarded Kanda as a direct character based on his fast actions despite the appearance he provides to the audience. When comparing to his manga counterpart, Sakurai noted Kanda's anime version was different in order to build up suspense for the series' future. When asked about what part of his character could he relate, Sakurai answered it was his sturborness. In the anime sequel, D.Gray-man Hallow, Sakurai was replaced with Takuya Satō. In this series, Kanda's child self was voiced by Tsubasa Yonaga. In Funimation's English adaptation of the series, Kanda was voiced by Travis Willingham. Like Sakurai, Willingham was replaced with another actor, Ian Sinclair, for Hallow, who lamented the role's change.

== Appearances ==
=== In D.Gray-man ===
A powerful Exorcist from the Black Order who combats demons known as Akuma, Yu Kanda first appears in D.Gray-man's fifth manga chapter. There, Kanda attacks newcomer Allen Walker after the gate's guardian considers him cursed.^{[ch. 5]} While his comrade Lenalee Lee resolves this misunderstanding, Kanda continues this poor relationship with Allen during their first mission together.^{[ch. 8]} He also openly objects to the paternal way his master, General Froi Tiedoll, treats him,^{[ch. 135]} and he and Allen later start throwing insults and offensive statements at one another.^{[ch. 89, 90]} Kanda refuses to die until he finds a "certain person". While fighting, Kanda uses a mythical fragment known as "Innocence". It takes the form of an anti-Akuma weapon, Mugen (六幻; lit. "Six Illusions"), seen as a Japanese sword.^{[ch. 186]} Mugen is capable of several techniques, including creation of "illusions".^{[ch. 10]} Kanda uses these powers to fight the Akuma, as well as the Noah Family, who aim to destroy mankind. Once he joins his comrades in Edo in order to protect the Generals, Kanda is trapped inside a place known as Noah's Ark alongside them.^{[ch. 86]} There, he engages the Noah Skin Bolic to allow his allies to move to another room. Although Kanda defeats Bolic, the room is destroyed after Kanda pushes Mugen to its limit. Later, Allen manages to take control of the Ark's piano, which grants his wish of restoring it.^{[ch. 97]} Kanda then returns with them to the Black Order.^{[ch. 133]}

It is later revealed that Kanda is a "Second Exorcist": an artificial body possessing the brain of an Exorcist who died thirty years before the storyline. The Black Order had launched the Synthetic Disciple Project nine years before, hoping that Second Exorcists would be able to synchronize with their Innocence.^{[ch. 186, 187]} In order for him to survive the synchronization tests, his body was created to heal much more quickly than that of an ordinary human through an Om tattooed on the left side of his chest.^{[ch. 190]}^{[ch. 16]}^{[ch. 12,198]} Kanda was the second Second Exorcist to awaken, after his friend Alma Karma.^{[ch. 190]} Driven insane after learning his origins, Alma killed the research staff and attacked Kanda; However, Alma is instead killed by his friend, who wished to meet his past lover.^{[ch. 193]} In the main storyline, Alma is found afterwards found to be alive as an Akuma by the Noah, and tries to kill Kanda again in revenge. During the battle, Allen discovers that Alma is the reincarnation of the woman that Kanda had been looking for.^{[ch. 198]} After learning this, Kanda embraces Alma as both are transported by Allen to another place, hoping that the two would find peace.^{[ch. 199]} There, Alma dies shortly after telling Kanda that he loves him.^{[ch. 200]}

Three months after Alma's death, Kanda returns to the Order.^{[ch. 207]} There, he makes peace with the scientist who started the Synthetic Disciple Project. Kanda's willingness to return and be an Exorcist causes Mugen to evolve into a Crystal-type weapon, requiring Kanda to give part of his blood to wield it.^{[ch. 208]} Shortly afterwards, Kanda and a scientist named Johnny Gill go on a mission to find Allen – who had escaped the Order after being treated as a Noah – in order to thank him for giving him and Alma their happiness, as well as redemption for never caring that Walker was turning into a Noah while going on missions with him.^{[ch. 210]} Johnny and Kanda briefly find Allen but are attacked by Apocryphos, a sentient Innocence, who tries to rewrite Kanda's memories of Allen. However, Kanda is saved by Froi Tiedoll. He convinces him to become a General in order to regain his trust from the Order.^{[ch. 217]}

=== In other media ===
As well as being in the manga and anime series, Kanda is a playable character in the two D.Gray-man video games, D.Gray-man Apostles of God and D.Gray-man: Requirements of a Instrumentalist, as well as in the crossover fighting game Jump Ultimate Stars. He appears in the D.Gray-man light novels series by Kaya Kizaki. The first one, set before the series' beginnings, has Kanda on a mission to recover missing assistants of the Black Order in a village where a witch is rumored to live. He is a supporting character in the second novel, where he attends a party thrown by the Black Order. In the third novel, Kanda makes a brief appearance in the first chapter: a scientist from the Asian Branch of the Black Order, Gigi Lujun, reveals that he once kissed Kanda as a child. This angers Kanda, causing him to leave the area.

== Cultural impact ==
=== Merchandising and popularity ===
Yu Kanda has been highly popular with the D.Gray-man reader base, often ranking in top-ten polls. In the first poll, he ranked second to Allen,^{[vol. 7:117]} and in the next poll he took the top place.^{[ch. 121]} Kanda once again took second place in the third poll, losing to Allen,^{[ch. 171]} but took the first place again in the fourth and latest poll. Hoshino was surprised by Kanda's popularity with the readers, as she just saw him as a regular character. Merchandise based on Kanda's character has been released, including cosplay costumes, his sword Mugen, and wigs. For Halloween 2016, more merchandise related to Kanda and other characters was released, including a blue tonic. In a popularity poll by the Japanese web portal goo, Kanda was voted as the eighth-most-popular character with a ponytail. A poll by Animage magazine of the top 100 anime characters of 2016 ranked Kanda 76th for his role in Hallow. In a poll by Anime News Network, Kanda was voted as the seventh-best male anime character with long hair.

=== Critical reception ===
Kanda has received mixed reactions for his appearances in manga, anime, and other media ever since his introduction. UK Anime Network's Kevin Leathers simply referred to him as "the resident emo", a brooding character who might develop later in the series. Erkael from Manga News compared him with several other characters, such as Vegeta from Dragon Ball and Sasuke Uchiha from Naruto, based on their antisocial personalities. Sheena McNeil from Sequentialtart said that while she found the character's personality to be "cold", she still found his design and his anti-Akuma weapon appealing. Despite finding issues with the anime adaptation of the series, Anime News Network's Casey Brienza commented that Kanda was a "fan favorite" character like Komui Lee, both of which have traits that appeal to the audience. Animation Insider's Kimberly Morales enjoyed the contrast between Kanda and Allen's different personalities. John Rose from The Fandom Post liked Kanda and Allen's partnership, considering it to be the greatest strength of the manga's second volume. Additionally, Kanda's constant clashes with Allen were praised by Richard Osborn from IGN due to how comical they were, contrasting with the series' dark plot. Similarly, Sandra Scholes from Active Anime found Kanda and Allen to be "not the standard anime variety", comparing them more to characters from fantasy stories. Since his appearance in the manga's second volume, Kanda has made minor appearances in the series. His return in the tenth volume was praised by Erkael, as well as his battle against the antagonist Noah Skin Bolic.

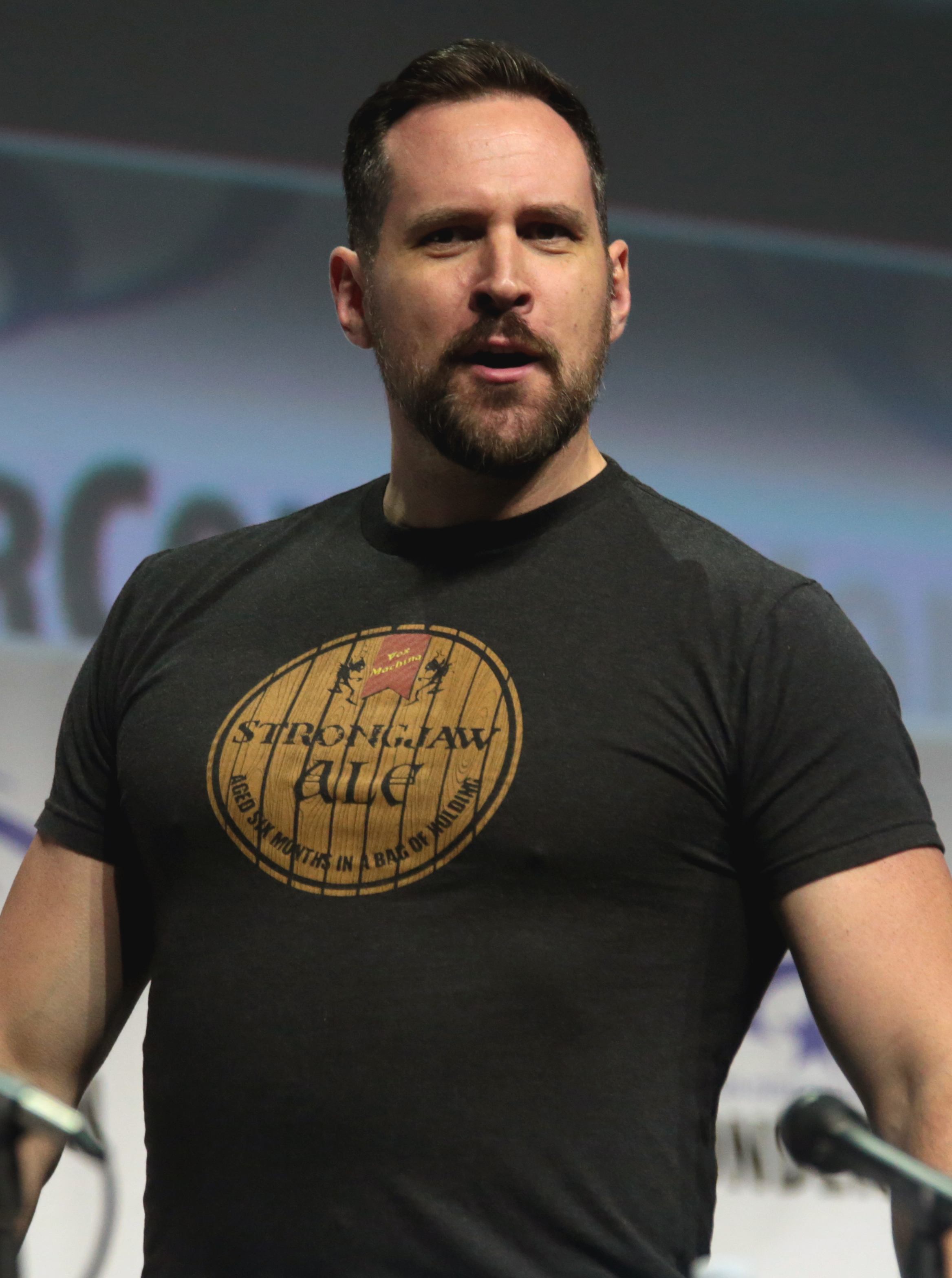
Travis Willingham's work as Kanda's English voice actor received mixed responses.

The reviewers' comments were more positive regarding the next story arcs of the series. Erkael expressed surprise at how dark Kanda's past was, noting the impact it had on the character. Chris Beveridge, a reviewer from the Fandom Post, also enjoyed the flashbacks that detailed Kanda's past and said that it would be "interesting" to observe Kanda and Allen's relationship in future volumes. Anne Lauenroth from Anime News Network found Kanda's past as pitiful, since he is waiting for a love interest who might either be alive or dead. The reviewer also addressed how killing his only and best friend, Alma Karma, in order to continue living created the antisocial traits he displays in the series. Leroy Douresseaux from Comic Book Bin enjoyed the fight between Kanda and Alma, but preferred the situation Allen was put into and said that he wanted to see more of that. Similarly, Chris Kirby enjoyed the duel's violence, but felt it was overshadowed by Allen's awakening as the 14th Noah, Nea. During the battle, it is revealed that the two fighters had been lovers; Kanda stops fighting Alma and embraces him, giving him "love" earning praise by Lauenroth for showing a more mature side of the former. She also remarked how the scene helped to develop the character to the point that he calls Allen by his name for the first time instead of using nicknames, as he had done since they had met. Kanda's maturity, as reflected in his desire to become an Exorcist again for the sake of helping the missing Allen in the second anime's finale, also earned high praise from Lauenroth. Kirby agreed with her, noting how his return to the Black Order, despite his hatred towards it, helped to develop his character, commenting that previously, Kanda was not as engaging. In the next story arc, Douresseaux expected to see more of Kanda's dynamic with Johnny Gill as the two went in search of Allen.

Though Kanda is not even in a romantic relationship with other characters, Christine Détrez from Research Gate noted that Kanda is often paired up with his ally Lavi in Dojinshi in a similar fashion to Clamp characters. Anime Argentina praised the character for how different he tends to from fans' point of view due to his cold, immature and distant personality and felt he was the complete opposite of Allen due to their personalities while still remaining interesting. A figurine based on his Hallow design was also released by Aniplex which appealed to AkibaStation.

Some critics also commented on the character's voice actors. The first Japanese actor for Kanda, Takahiro Sakurai, was described by Lauenroth as having appropriate "hate and arrogance", leading Lauenroth to be a fan of Kanda because of Sakurai. Morales criticized Kanda's English voice actor, Travis Willingham, as "his portrayal of the cold and mysterious Kanda makes the young man sound more like a bodybuilder than a lithe swordsman". On the other hand, Michael Marr from Capsule Computers enjoyed Willingham's work, believing it was equal to Sakurai's. For the sequel, D.Gray-man Hallow, Sakurai was replaced by Takuya Satō; Lauenroth had mixed feelings about the new voice actor, describing Satō's performance as one of "stoic indifference". Nevertheless, she praised both Satō and the actor voicing Kanda's younger self, Tsubasa Yonaga, for their roles in Hallow's seventh episode, due to how they portrayed Kanda's tragic backstory.
