= D.Gray-man =

Japanese manga series and its franchise

- First tankōbon volume cover, featuring Allen Walker (left) and the Millennium Earl (right)
- Genre: Adventure; Dark fantasy; Science fantasy
- Manga
- Written by: Katsura Hoshino
- Published by: Shueisha
- English publisher: AUS: Madman Entertainment; NA: Viz Media
- Imprint: Jump Comics
- Magazine: Weekly Shōnen Jump; (May 31, 2004 – April 27, 2009); Jump Square; (November 4, 2009 – January 4, 2013); Jump SQ.Crown; (July 17, 2015 – January 19, 2018); Jump SQ.Rise; (April 16, 2018 – present)
- Original run: May 31, 2004 – present
- Volumes: 29
- Light novel

D.Gray-man: Reverse
- Written by: Kaya Kizaki
- Illustrated by: Katsura Hoshino
- Published by: Shueisha
- Imprint: Jump J-Books
- Original run: May 30, 2005 – December 3, 2010
- Volumes: 3
- Anime series adaptations
- D.Gray-man (2006–2008); D.Gray-man Hallow (2016)
- icon

D.Gray-man is a Japanese manga series written and illustrated by Katsura Hoshino. Set in an alternate 19th century, it tells the story of a young Allen Walker, who joins an organization of exorcists named the Black Order. They use an ancient substance, Innocence, to combat a man known as the Millennium Earl and his demonic army of Akuma who intend to destroy humanity. Many characters are adapted from Hoshino's previous works and drafts, such as Zone. The series is noted for its dark narrative; Hoshino once rewrote a scene she thought too violent for her young readers.

The manga started serialization in Shueisha's shōnen manga magazine Weekly Shōnen Jump in May 2004. Production of the series was suspended several times due to Hoshino's health problems. D.Gray-man made the transition from a weekly to a monthly series in November 2009, when it began serialization in Jump Square. In January 2013, the series went on indefinite hiatus. It resumed serialization in July 2015 after the release of Jump SQ.Crown, a spin-off from the magazine Jump SQ. After Jump SQ.Crown ceased publication, the series was switched to Jump SQ.Rise, starting in April 2018. The manga's chapters have been collected in 29 tankōbon volumes as of July 2025. The manga is licensed for an English release in North America by Viz Media, which has released 29 volumes by August 2026.

A spin-off novel series, D.Gray-man: Reverse by Kaya Kizaki, explores the history of a number of characters. A 103-episode anime television series adaptation by TMS Entertainment aired from October 2006 to September 2008. A 13-episode sequel anime series, D.Gray-man Hallow, also produced by TMS Entertainment aired from July to September 2016. Several items of merchandise have been produced, including two video games about the series.

The manga has become one of Shueisha's bestsellers, with over 27 million copies in circulation. In Japan and North America, several individual volumes have appeared in weekly top-ten lists of best-selling manga. Although most reviewers found it similar to other shōnen manga, they compared its moments of originality and well-developed characters favorably to other series of the same demographic. Hoshino's artwork has received mostly positive reviews; most critics have commented that her characters are visually appealing and that the Gothic elements in her art are pleasant to look at. However, one critic of her artwork has said that Hoshino's fight sequences can be difficult to follow.

== Synopsis ==
=== Setting ===
Set in an alternate 19th century, the story focuses on an organization of exorcists, named the Black Order, as they defend humanity against the Noah Family, reincarnations of Noah and his twelve apostles whom bear hatred towards humanity and God led by a man known as the Millennium Earl. The exorcists' main weapon against the Noah Family is sentient holy artifacts called Innocence. Innocence comes in a variety of forms, varying from everyday objects such as boots to grandfather clocks, to weapons such as swords and guns; regardless of their form, each Innocence possesses unique offensive and supportive abilities and will only work for the wielder of their choosing. Out of the 109 Innocence hidden and scattered throughout the world, one of them is the master Innocence; whichever side obtains this Innocence first will win the war. In contrast to the Innocence, the Noah Family's weapons are derived from a power source known as Dark Matter. Dark Matter grants the Noah superpowers, along with the ability to create and control demons.

=== Plot ===
The central character is Allen Walker, a new recruit to the Black Order who started training to control his Innocence after it destroyed the Akuma of his late guardian, Mana. The story begins in a villain of the week fashion, where Allen teams up with various members of the Black Order to search for Innocence while battling Noah's demons on the way. Later, Allen and his friends are ordered to track down exorcist General Cross Marian, Allen's missing teacher. Their search concludes with them stealing one of the Noah's transportation device, referred to as the Noah's Ark; this was made possible since Allen has been instilled the consciousness of Nea D. Campbell, the brother of Mana, and the exiled 14th member of the Noah Family, who the Earl wishes to have back. Cross reveals that Nea plans to use Allen as host upon reincarnating, effectively erasing Allen eventually. During the Third Exorcists insurrection story arc, Nea's consciousness begins superseding Allen's body. Now hunted by the Black Order, the Noah Family, and a humanoid Innocence called Apocryphos, Allen goes into hiding as he searches for a way to end Nea's resurrection. During his journey, he realises that his late guardian, Mana, alongside Nea, has a strong link to the Millennium Earl. He then decides to journey to the place where Mana and Nea grew up to learn the truth about them, and their connection to the Earl. Following his escape, Allen is tracked by the Black Order, Apocryphos and the Noah. When Apocryphos is distracted by the Noah, the Earl finds Allen who is possessed by Nea. During this encounter it is revealed that the current Earl is Mana D. Campbell, Nea's brother. Both were once the original Millennium Earl but were split and became enemies.

== Production ==
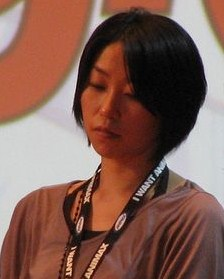
Manga author Katsura Hoshino incorporated several elements of her one-shot title Zone into D.Gray-man

After graduating from high school, Hoshino was uncertain whether to pursue a career in animation or manga. While attempting to draw shōjo manga (series aimed at young girls), she considered herself unsuccessful. Consequently, she shifted her focus to shōnen manga aimed at male readers. After submitting a one-shot to Shueisha, she was surprised by the editorial staff's positive response. D.Gray-man originated from a one-shot Hoshino developed in her youth, where she intended the Earl to be the main character. Deeming the character unsuitable for a teenage manga magazine, she created Allen Walker as the protagonist instead. Hoshino submitted a draft of D.Gray-man to Shueisha on an unspecified date. She had mixed feelings about proceeding with the series, as she had received other job offers, including video game development. However, Shueisha approved the draft, and the staff encouraged her to launch the series in 2004, believing it would be popular. Her initial concept involved a zombie story, but she abandoned the idea on the advice of her editor T-shi during the third chapter. When asked about her inspiration for the supernatural, Hoshino cited a fear stemming from viewing the 1973 film The Exorcist, which also influenced her design of the manga's Akuma. The area known as Noah's Ark was based on science fiction concepts rather than the supernatural influences behind the Akuma. After conceiving the Ark's role, Hoshino decided to include a song played on a piano while Allen rebuilds it. She requested help from her editor, a university graduate, but ultimately used her own lyrics, attributing this to her own ego.

Elements of D.Gray-man first appeared in Hoshino's one-shot title Zone, which featured the Akuma, exorcists, and the Millennium Earl planning to end the world. Although Allen Walker is male, his character is based on Zone's female protagonist. Lavi is based on the protagonist of Hoshino's planned series, Book-man, which she had originally intended to write. Other characters, such as the Millennium Earl, Lenalee Lee, and Komui Lee, are based on real people whom Hoshino has not specifically identified; some are well-known scientists, and Komui is based on Hoshino's boss. The character of Yu Kanda, based on a samurai, was created to vary D.Gray-man's Western setting. Hoshino found the design of some characters difficult early in the series. In 2011, the author visited New York City for research, believing the city had greatly influenced her work. Hoshino visited cemeteries and was deeply impressed by her guides' comments at Ground Zero of the World Trade Center (the site of the September 11 attacks). She expressed a desire to spend more time in New York City to gather further material for the series.

After beginning D.Gray-man, Hoshino considered retaining the name Zone and also contemplated Dolls or Black Noah. She chose "D.Gray-man" for its multiple meanings, most referring to the state of Allen and other main characters. Although the title's meaning was not fully explained, Hoshino stated that the "D" stands for "dear". According to the author, most of her ideas for the series came to her while sleeping in her bathtub for six hours. One exception was the second-volume plot, based on a Noh story entitled "Koi no Omoni".

When the manga moved from weekly to monthly serialization in 2009, Hoshino addressed readers' concerns about possible cancellation and reassured them the series would continue. She established Kanda's backstory by introducing the Third Exorcists, characters related to him and Alma Karma. Hoshino's original drafts for Kanda's past contained several plot holes. The rewritten, published version initially depicted a young Kanda walking a path surrounded by dead caretakers. Due to its violence, this was replaced with Kanda learning that Alma Karma had killed them all. When the chapters were collected into a volume, Hoshino added a small chapter that included the corpses.

=== Writing ===
While drawing, Hoshino often rewrites sketches to the point where the final images diverge from her original ideas. For chapter titles, she attempts to create something bright to contrast the series's dark narrative. Fellow writer Takeshi Obata noted that Hoshino's art continues to improve, though she stated she is unaware of any change. Due to the story's intense development, Hoshino believes she can no longer draw simple eyes. When producing the series, Hoshino entrusts her storyboards to her editor, a process initially complicated as D.Gray-man was her first serialized work. The weekly serialization resulted in multiple changes to the storyboards. After switching to a quarterly serialization, she began working digitally from the storyboard stage, inspired by manga author Tite Kubo's similar style on Bleach. This allowed for more detailed illustrations and more unique character faces. Hoshino works with two assistants, though the number sometimes increases near deadlines. Under the quarterly schedule, her assistants often work from home using material she sends them, though Hoshino has expressed regrets about this method due to potential misunderstandings. Hoshino has claimed in an interview that she finds fight scenes difficult to draw. However, manga author Osamu Akimoto has praised certain compositions, such as the handling of Lenalee Lee before Noah's Ark and the depiction of Jasdevi's guns.

=== Characters ===
When designing characters, Hoshino first imagines their lives, even if some details are not featured in the story. She writes down their personalities, habits, and eating preferences, though she has admitted to not having written details for many D.Gray-man characters. For the Earl, Hoshino gave him a colorful look to contrast the exorcists' black uniforms, intending to convey a gentleman associated with tragedy, whom she linked to a poisonous flower. Hoshino found the Black Order exorcists' first uniforms easy to draw and liked them. The second uniforms presented difficulties due to the addition of zippers. For the third uniforms, she retained black but added red as a blood reference, believing the grotesque style fit the series's themes. In early color illustrations, Hoshino experimented with giving Allen gothic lolita-style clothing and a color style referencing American comics. Other early color illustrations were meant to be symbolic, such as Kanda depicted as a puppet or Allen covered by Akuma threads, later symbolizing his Innocence returning to his body.

The author noted that Lavi was popular with fans, placing third in a poll (behind Allen and Kanda) despite infrequent appearances in later story arcs, and she promised he would return. The Alma Karma arc, featuring several characters, was difficult for the author; the subsequent arc, in which Allen leaves the Black Order, contained fewer characters per chapter due to its different format. The character Apocryphos was introduced to hint at the Heart, a plot element briefly described earlier that would later reappear. Due to Jump Square's readership, which consisted of older men rather than children, Hoshino found Allen the most difficult character to write. She aimed to avoid portraying him solely as a troubled teenager, preferring to show him as a cheerful person with a balance of strength and sorrow. Following the dark narrative of D.Gray-man, Hoshino expressed her intent to create more lighthearted series in the future.

=== Themes ===
According to Hoshino, the series's main theme is tragedy. Many characters, including Allen, suffer poor fates, such as losing a loved one and being tempted to revive them by the Earl. While this is possible, the revived become Akuma who consume their loved ones' skin. This led Hoshino to state that an initial theme is that people should not be brought back to life. Although characters like Kanda express unconditional love for Alma, their happiness is short-lived due to Alma's subsequent death, which another writer found fitting for the series's dark tone. Additionally, Allen's life becomes increasingly tragic as he is forced to abandon the Black Order after the Pope revokes his rights as an exorcist and is treated as a Noah due to his connections with them. Nevertheless, Hoshino aimed to keep the narrative engaging for readers, stating that Allen will always have allies.

Another theme is the lack of black-and-white morality. Although Allen begins as a hero in the Black Order, the group's actions are later revealed to be morally ambiguous. Similarly, the Noah clan shows hidden depths despite their evil nature; the antagonistic Earl displays care for the Noah Nea D. Campbell, while Tyki Mikk questions whether Allen should return to the Order given his treatment as Nea's vessel.

In Representing Multiculturalism in Comics and Graphic Novels, Jacob Birken identifies identity as another theme. This is reflected in Allen and the exorcists familiarizing themselves with their supernatural powers to become more human. Conversely, Allen's revelation as the 14th Noah makes him less human. Another theme is grief, as seen in the Millennium Earl's appearance as a tired, middle-aged man constantly searching for his former comrade, Nea. Hoshino believed the Earl would fit the manga's demographic. In Anime and Philosophy: Wide Eyed Wonder, Josef Steiff and Tristan D. Tamplin discuss how D.Gray-man, alongside Spriggan and Ulysses 31, focuses on the "end of the world", with D.Gray-man and Spriggan drawing references from the biblical flood.

Hoshino's illustrations often depict Allen covered in threads, symbolizing his connection to God and his bound duty to exorcise Akuma. Similarly, early color pages depicted Kanda with multiple threads, symbolizing his role as a puppet in his futile search for a specific person throughout his life.

== Media ==
=== Manga ===
Written and illustrated by Katsura Hoshino, D.Gray-man started its serialization in Shueisha's shōnen manga magazine Weekly Shōnen Jump on May 31, 2004. The series went on hiatus several times due to issues with Hoshino's health. Publication resumed on March 9, 2009. The series's 186th and last chapter in the magazine was published on April 27, 2009. The series reappeared in the seasonal magazine Akamaru Jump on August 17 of that same year, and later resumed publication in the monthly manga magazine Jump Square, where it ran from November 4, 2009, to January 4, 2013. After a hiatus of over two years, the series was transferred to the quarterly magazine Jump SQ.Crown, running from July 17, 2015, to January 19, 2018, when the magazine ceased publication. The manga moved to the brand-new quarterly magazine Jump SQ.Rise on April 16, 2018.

Individual chapters have been published in tankōbon format by Shueisha. The first volume features Allen Walker and the Millennium Earl together. In original revisions of such cover, both were drawn from the back but the editorial demanded Hoshino to make Allen more visible as he is the main character. In the making of each volume, Hoshino originally wanted each cover to be focused on a single character. However, after the ninth volume Hoshino changed her mind and instead decided to try different types of covers that feature multiple characters. The first volume was published on October 9, 2004. As of July 4, 2025, 29 volumes have been released.

At the 2005 San Diego Comic-Con, D.Gray-man was licensed for an English-language publication in North America by Viz Media. The company published the first collected volume of the series on May 2, 2006. The 29th volume was released on August 4, 2026. Viz Media reissued the series in a 3-in-1 format, publishing eight 3-volumes-in-1 editions from July 2, 2013, to November 3, 2015. Madman Entertainment published the first 27 volumes of Viz Media's English edition in Australia and New Zealand, from August 10, 2008, to November 15, 2021.

=== Anime ===
A 103-episode anime television series adaptation, animated by TMS Entertainment, was broadcast TV Tokyo from October 2006 to September 2008.

A 13-episode anime series sequel, titled D.Gray-man Hallow, also animated by TMS Entertainment, was broadcast on TV Tokyo from July to September 2016.

=== Video games ===
Two D.Gray-man adventure games, based on the first anime series, have been released. The first, D.Gray-man: Kami no Shitotachi (D.Gray-man 神の使徒達; lit. "D. Gray-man The Apostles of God") for Nintendo DS, was released in Japan by Konami on March 29, 2007, with Allen and his comrades as playable characters. The second, D.Gray-man: Sousha no Shikaku (D.Gray-man 奏者ノ資格; lit. "D. Gray-man Instrumentalist's Qualifications"), was released for PlayStation 2 on September 11, 2008. In it, Allen trains in the Asian headquarters of the Black Order to regain powers lost after a previous battle so he can rejoin his allies to fight the Akuma and Noah. Allen and other series characters appear in the Nintendo DS fighting game Jump Super Stars and its sequel, Jump Ultimate Stars, and he is a supporting character in the fighting game J-Stars Victory VS.

=== Books ===
A three-volume light novel based on the manga series, D.Gray-man: Reverse by Kaya Kizaki, was published by Shueisha. The first volume, published on May 30, 2005, focuses on Allen's journey to the Black Order after he finishes his exorcism training, Yu Kanda's mission to find a witch, and Asian branch head Bak Chan, who tries to learn how Komui Lee was elected European branch head (instead of himself). The second volume, published on July 4, 2006, is set in the Black Order. Allen and other characters attend a party, Lavi trains to be the next Bookman before he meets Allen, and the Millennium Earl searches for people to create Akuma. The third volume was published on December 3, 2010. Its first chapter follows Black Order scientist Rohfa's search for Allen, with whom she is infatuated. In the second chapter, Allen lives with a circus as a child after he is abandoned by his parents.

Several other series-related books also exist published by Shueisha. The D.Gray-man Official Fanbook: Gray Ark was published on June 4, 2008, and TV Animation D.Gray-man Official Visual Collection: Clown Art on September 4. Three omnibus editions were published from November 13, 2009, to January 15, 2010. They were followed by an illustrated book, D.Gray-man Illustrations Noche, on February 4, 2010. Noche was published by Viz Media on December 6, 2011. The artist's book also contains two interviews with Hoshino and manga artists Osamu Akimoto and Takeshi Obata. D.Gray-man Character Ranking Book, a compilation of character popularity polls with character profiles by Hoshino and the one-shot "Exorcist no Natsu Yasumi" (エクソシストの夏休み; lit. "Exorcist's Summer Vacation"), was published on July 4, 2011. A new book, D.Gray-man Official Fan Book - Gray Log (Gray's Memory), was released in Japan on August 4, 2017.

== Reception ==
=== Popularity ===
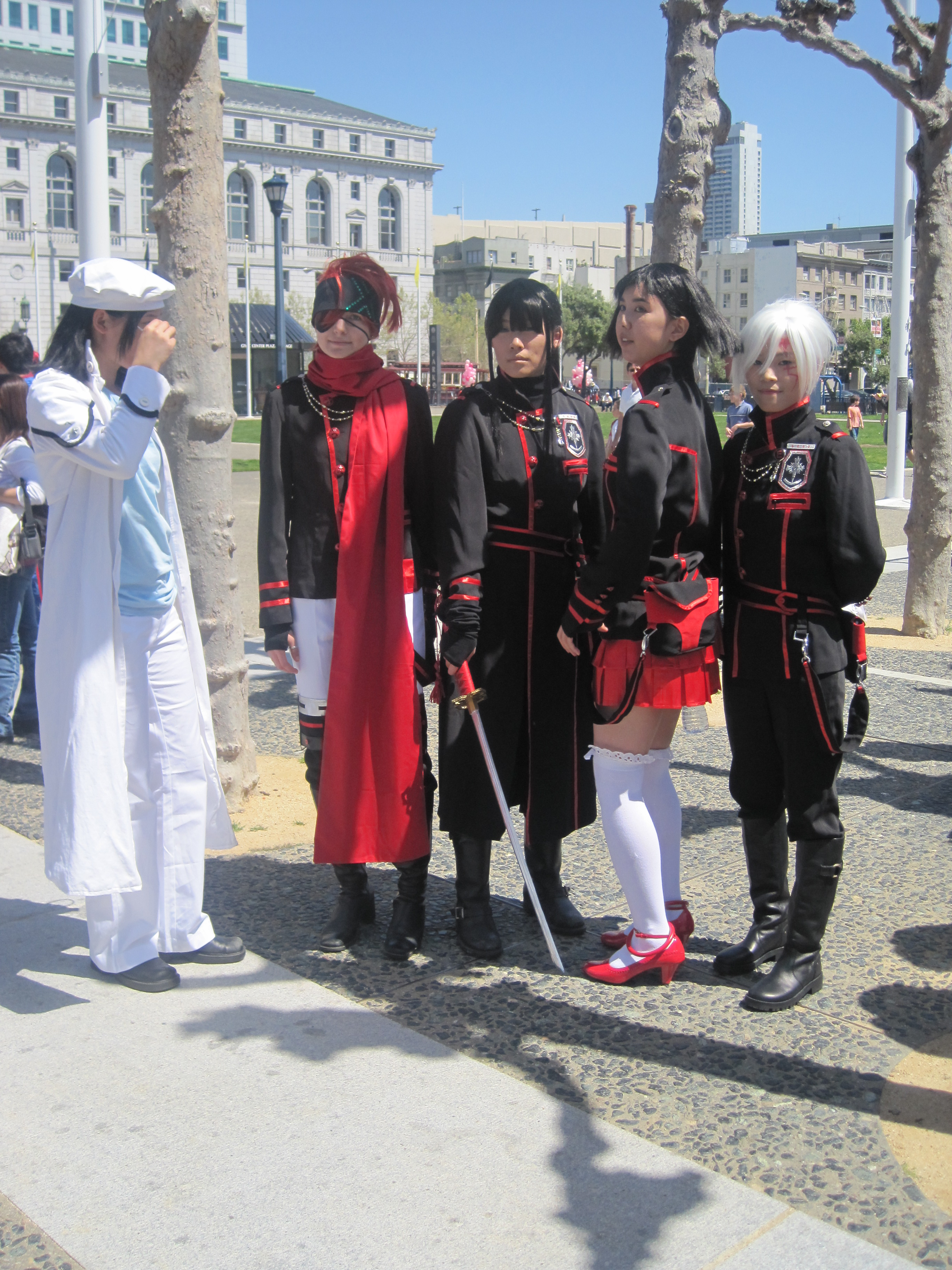
Cosplayers portraying D.Gray-man characters have been popular

The manga has been popular in Japan. Hoshino credited her editors with contributing significantly to the success of the series. One of Weekly Shōnen Jump's best-selling series, individual volumes have appeared on annual Japanese top-50 manga sales lists; in 2008, volumes 14, 15, and 16 were on the list. Later volumes were also Japanese bestsellers. The manga had over 27 million copies in circulation by July 2025.

Volumes of Viz Media's English version of the series have appeared on best-selling manga lists in the New York Times and Nielsen BookScan. According to ICv2, D.Gray-man was the 14th best-selling manga property from May through the first half of July 2008 and the 15th best-selling manga in Q3 of the same year. In 2009 and 2010, the series was North America's best-selling shōnen property and the best-selling manga overall. It was ranked as the 24th and 23rd North American manga property on ICv2's Top 25 Manga list in 2011 and 2012, respectively.

Zassosha's manga magazine, Puff, ranked the series the seventh-best long-story manga of 2006. In France, it received the Best Manga Series of 2006 award at the Anime and Manga 2007 French Grand Prix (organized by Animeland) and the 2006 Manga of the Year award from Webotaku. Its novelizations were also well-received; the second volume was the third best-selling novel in Japan in 2006. D.Gray-man's characters have also inspired cosplay. On TV Asahi's Manga Sōsenkyo 2021 poll, in which 150.000 people voted for their top 100 manga series, D.Gray-man ranked 95th.

=== Critical reception ===
Reception of the series has been generally positive. In his review of the first volume, Carlo Santos of Anime News Network (ANN) said that certain plot points "come out of nowhere" and the story was kept from its full potential due to finding some points like the designs generic. However, he enjoyed the series's quick-moving plot, exposition, and backstory. Sheena McNeil of Sequential Tart called it the best manga from 2006 based on its story and cast. A.E. Sparrow of IGN also reviewed the first volume, comparing the series's antagonist to three of Batman's villains due to his likeability despite his role. Sparrow also enjoyed Allen's characterization based on his tragic backstory. Calling the early volumes an "amateur comic", reviewer Leroy Douresseaux of ComicBookBin noted that the plot and art improved significantly with each volume, whereas Danica Davidson of Otaku USA was amazed by the amount of its different mixed elements, stating that it is "part shonen, part fantasy, part horror, part mythology, part action, part comedy, part really warped comedy, part goth, part historical, part alternative history," concluding that although these elements are typical of manga, the series "remains so different." Ross Liversidge of UK Anime Network enjoyed the first three volumes; Hoshino had "an excellent quality of storytelling" in juggling dark plot, light comedy and appealing characters. According to Brian Henson of Mania.com, the series became better over time; although some elements seemed derivative, it developed a unique identity. Yussif Osman of Japanator said that the characters were some of the deepest seen in shōnen manga, citing Lavi's backstory and the Noah Family.

Later volumes were also praised; Otaku USA's Joseph Luster appreciated the series's battles and Allen's development. The revelation that Allen would be an enemy of the Order and the 14th Noah was well received by Grant Goodman of PopCultureShock and Chris Beveridge of The Fandom Post. However, Goodman criticized early-volume reliance on comedy rather than plot. Beveridge and Erkael of Manga News were impressed with Kanda's dark past. Douresseaux liked Allen's situation in Volume 21 (due to the character's connections with the Noah), and wanted to see more of that and less of Kanda's fight with Alma Karma. Chris Kirby of The Fandom Post felt the constant mysteries across the series were entertaining, but lamented the continuous hiatus Hoshino had to take, leaving multiple fans disappointed in regards to future story events. With the release of the 29th volume in 2025, Kitun Nozomi of Real Sound noted that the series's narrative had evolved significantly from its initial premise, explaining that the central conflict expanded beyond the war between exorcists and the Noah clan to involve a sentient Innocence targeting protagonist Allen Walker and the internal struggle with his Noah persona, Nea. This development introduced greater complexity to the Holy War, suggesting that the story had entered a climactic phase. Nozomi also mentioned several unresolved mysteries, such as the true origins of the Noah clan and the significance of Allen's role as the "Heart" of the Innocence.

Hoshino's art received mixed reviews. According to Casey Brienza of ANN, as of Volume 12, the battles were "practically unintelligible" yet liked the rest of the artwork. She described Hoshino's drawing style as the "aesthetic yet dynamic, superbly beautiful yet super-violent" style made famous by female manga artists arising from the late-1980s and early-1990s dōjinshi subculture, citing Clamp and Yun Kōga as examples. Brienza also talked about Hoshino's character designs, believing fans of both sexes would find them appealing. Douresseaux called Hoshino's art "highly stylish" and reminiscent of work by Joe Madureira, Kelley Jones, and Chris Bachalo. Describing her backgrounds as eerie and Lovecraftian, Douresseaux wrote that Hoshino made appealing scenes that combined both gothic and violent elements. Brian Henson criticized changes made to the Viz Media version, such as the replacement of Japanese sound effects with less-appealing ones and awkward translations of character names.
