= Allen Walker =

Fictional character from D.Gray-man

- D.Gray-man character
- Allen Walker in early chapters wielding Cross, illustration by Katsura Hoshino (Note: This illustration was first published in 2005 in Weekly Shonen Jump magazine, issue 30. Hoshino later commented that the character's serious expression made it unfitting for the publication.)
- First appearance: D.Gray-man manga chapter 1: "Opening" (2004)
- Created by: Katsura Hoshino
- Voiced by: Japanese; Sanae Kobayashi; Ayumu Murase (D.Gray-man Hallow); English; Todd Haberkorn
- Notable relatives: Mana Walker (guardian)

Allen Walker (Japanese: アレン・ウォーカー, Hepburn: Aren Wōkā) is a fictional character and the protagonist of the manga series D.Gray-man, which was created by the Japanese artist and writer Katsura Hoshino. In the series, which is set in the 19th century, Allen is a teenager who joins the Black Order, a group of soldiers known as exorcists. Allen uses an object called Innocence to fight demons known as Akuma. Allen's Innocence initially assumes the form of a gigantic left arm that evolves to give him new abilities. Allen also uses his Innocence to fight the Millennium Earl, who created an army of Akuma to destroy the world, and his superhuman followers the Noah Family. Allen learns he is connected to Noah and that he might become one of them.

Hoshino based Allen's characterization on Robin, the shorter-haired female protagonist of the one-shot comic Zone. Hoshino designed Allen's clothing to resemble that of the 19th century, giving him a ribbon tie and other accessories to make him appear gentlemanly. Hoshino gave Allen a calm demeanor in contrast with her typical rambunctious, rude characters; and to make him look intimidating she gave Allen a pentagram-shaped scar. The manga was adapted for television as an anime series in which Sanae Kobayashi voiced Allen. The voice actors were recast in the 2016 anime television series D.Gray-man Hallow, in which Ayumu Murase replaced Kobayashi. In the English adaptation of the anime series, Allen is voiced by Todd Haberkorn.

Allen is popular with D.Gray-man readers; he is usually ranked in the top three in the series' popularity polls. Reactions to the character in manga and anime publications, and other media, have been generally positive. His characterization has been praised; critics said his calm demeanor and mysterious origin are atypical of a shōnen protagonist. Some reviewers enjoyed Allen's voice actors. Merchandise featuring Allen's likeness, including plush dolls, figurines, clothing, and cosplay pieces, has been offered. In addition to the character's appearances in the anime series D.Gray-man and its sequel D.Gray-man Hallow, he has appeared in three light novels, two video games, and several crossover fighting games.

== Concept and creation ==
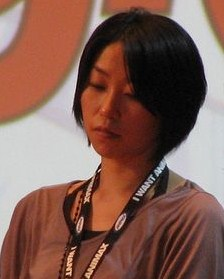
Manga author Katsura Hoshino based Allen on Zone's heroine Robin.

The manga creator Katsura Hoshino originally had no plans to create Allen's character in D.Gray-man; she wanted the Millennium Earl to be the story's protagonist. Hoshino created Allen because she found the Earl unsuitable for use as a main character in a manga magazine aimed at teenagers. Hoshino thought a mature design would be better. She believed her final design looked best wearing a Black Order uniform and wondered if the character should be more masculine.^{[vol. 1:61]} Hoshino, who likes her main characters to be rambunctious, rude idiots, did not know how Allen originated.^{[vol. 1:61]} She planned to design the character as an "energetic youth with messy fly-a-way hair", but when he was drawn with the Black Order uniform, the group Allen joins, she sensed a "lack of coordination". To increase the effect of Allen's arrival at the Black Order, Hoshino gave him the nickname "Destroyer of Time", which has no relevance to the story.

Hoshino based Allen on Robin, the protagonist of her one-shot comic Zone.^{[vol. 1:61]} Comparing the two, she called Allen a "different kind of boy". According to Hoshino's first editor, Allen was originally going to be a modified Akuma who looked like a boy. Her editor advised her to make Allen vulnerable by depicting him crying, which led to Allen being male to have a bigger effect on readers. As the manga continued, Hoshino called Allen a comrade and found a relationship between herself and the character, although Hoshino still admired the Millennium Earl. When the series started, Hoshino drew a colored image of Allen being held by an Akuma's limb, representing the series' atmosphere as both calm and grotesque.

Allen was introduced as a "gentleman". Hoshino demonstrated Allen's dark side by having the character strike his master Cross Marian in anger at his inability to learn how he would become the 14th Noah descendant Nea D. Campbell. According to Hoshino, Cross Marian was angry with Allen for the attack but enjoyed seeing this side of his student. For the arc involving the Third Exorcists, Hoshino's editors advised her to draw Allen as a fighter for the sake of the manga's characters Yu Kanda and Alma Karma, who are heavily featured in the saga. Allen's origins are not revealed in the manga but instead in the third light novel by Kaya Kizaki, who felt the need to re-read the original D.Gray-man manga to understand Allen's characterization. Hoshino found difficulties in writing the origins of Allen and Mana; Kizaki provided Hoshino's aid in the making of the third light novel which greatly helped the manga author to appreciate their backstory.

=== Design ===
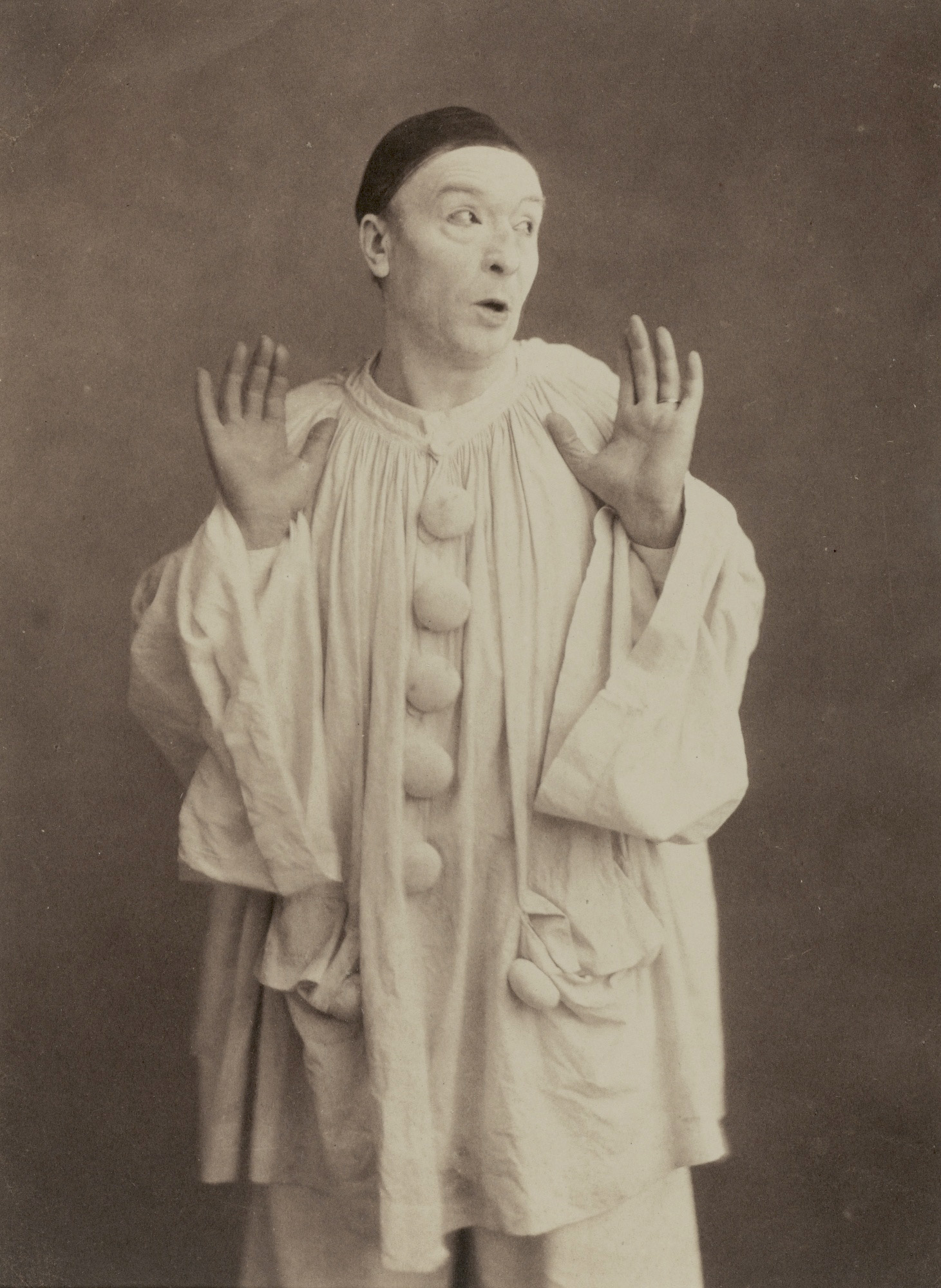
Due to Hoshino not liking Allen's first weaponry, she changed it to the Crowned Clown (right), inspired by the pierrot (left).

Hoshino parted Allen's hair in the center to emphasize his facial expressions. Because he is an exorcist, she wanted Allen to have a "very scary-looking image" and added a scar on his left forehead; the scar changed shape several times before becoming a pentagram. Because Hoshino wanted the Order and its enemies to have visual contrast, she gave Allen and the Exorcists black cloaks to give a "gloomy" impression. Allen's clothing is drawn from Hoshino's interpretation of late-19th-century costume; his ribbon tie and other accessories are intended to project a "gentlemanly image". While Allen became a darker character, Hoshino also wanted to symbolize his fear in the way Allen becomes afraid his late guardian Mana Walker did not love him. As a result, Hoshino made a minor design change and rearranged the scar Mana's Akuma placed on his forehead in a berserker state; by having the scar show more clearly, Allen's disquiet about his love for Mana is more clearly expressed.

According to Hoshino, later in the series, Allen's hairstyle becomes similar to that of a Super Saiyan—a transformation in the Dragon Ball series in which the character's hair becomes spiky.^{[vol . 11 :2]} Hoshino said early in D.Gray-man's publication, Allen was one of the most difficult characters to draw.^{[vol . 3 :86]} By the tenth volume, she said the character was more difficult to draw than Yu Kanda.^{[vol . 10 :204]} In the manga's first chapters, Allen's eyes have had different colors—red and light blue—due to a discussion between Hoshino and her editor; it was later decided to give him silver eyes.^{[vol . 3 :86]} The series' title D.Gray-man is intended to have several meanings, most referring to the state of Allen and the other main characters.^{[vol . 3 :26]}

During a story arc in which Allen tries to save a former Exorcist named Suman Dark, Allen's own Innocence—his deformed arm "Cross"— is destroyed in a confrontation. Because Allen trains to regain his Innocence in a sub-branch of the Black Order, Hoshino wanted to show his real powers. Hoshino said she experienced a lack of inspiration for Allen's frustration at not being able to fight again. Eventually, Hoshino was inspired to draw Allen's real Innocence—the Crowned Clown—which is based on the Italian Pierrot. She was satisfied with Allen saying he would fight for both humans and Akumas, symbolized by his two hands, and drew this scene carefully. By the start of the series, Hoshino intended Allen's weaponry to evolve because she started feeling Allen's first weapon, Cross, might be appealing to the readers. Crown Clown was created to be a more-stylish weapon for Allen.

Because Allen hides his identity from the Order but still claims to be an exorcist in a later arc, Hoshino conceived a new design for him that represents his self-proclamation of being one. During these chapters, Hoshino decided to hide Allen by having him dress like a street clown; her editors worried readers might not like this design because Allen would be masked and bald. Hoshino's editors were relieved when she told them upon Allen's revelation, he would not be bald and his un-made-up face would be revealed to retain the character's visual appeal.^{[vol . 23 :]}

Allen leaves the Black Order because the previous story arc had too many characters and required too much effort. Hoshino was pleased with her portrayal of Allen's farewell to comrade Lenalee Lee because it makes Allen appear more mature. She noted Allen has grown taller; early in the series, he and Lenalee are depicted at the same height. Hoshino said although Allen's departure fits the series' tragic theme, he would always have comrades. despite their frequent arguments, Allen and Kanda part on good terms; Hoshino said Kanda would help Allen in the next story. Allen's withdrawal from the Order had been planned since he encountered the enemy Road Kamelot because Allen's nature conflicts with those of the other Exorcists who, unlike him, do not wish to save the Akumas.

=== Voice actors ===
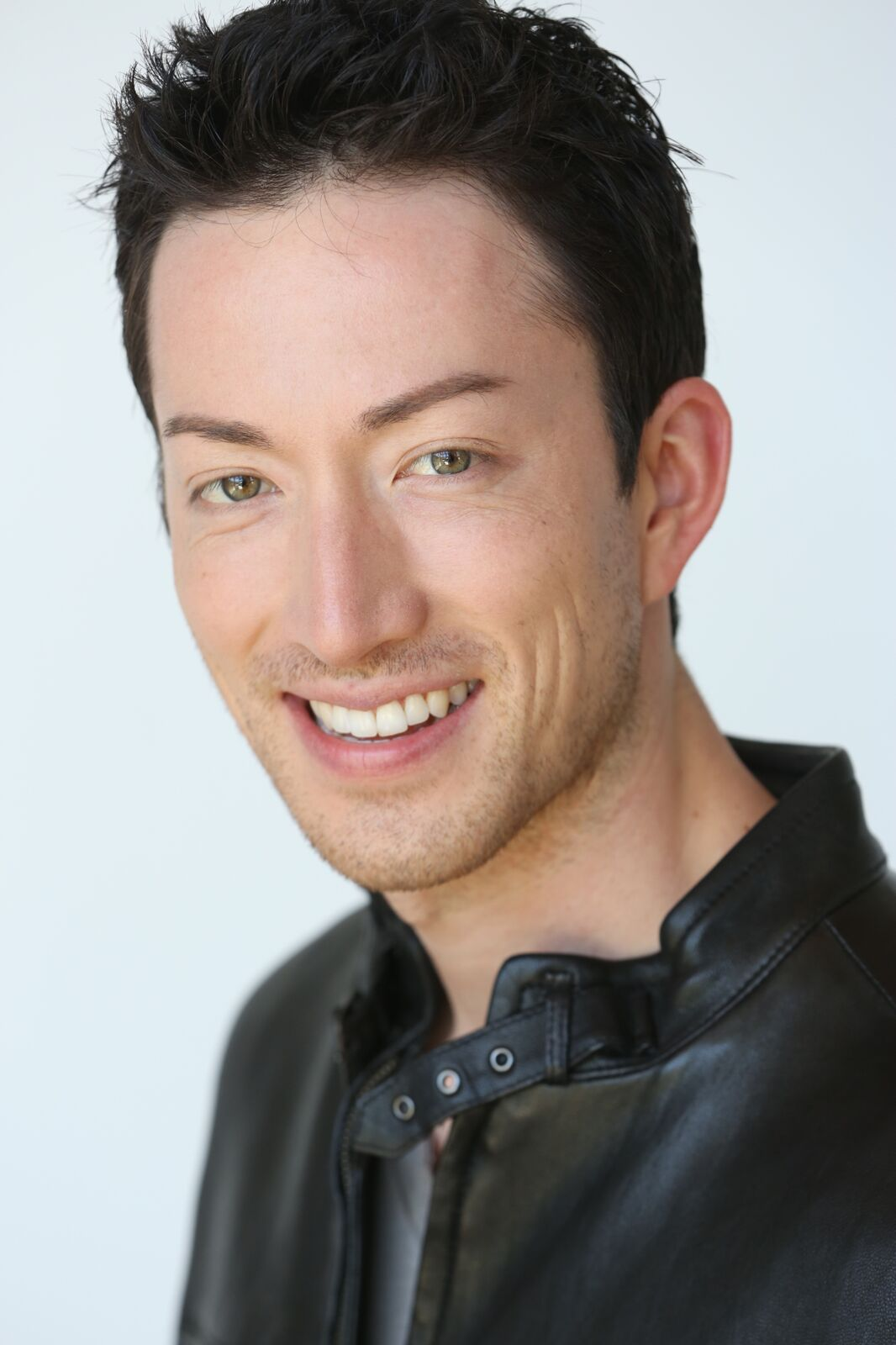
Todd Haberkorn voiced Allen Walker in the English dub of the series.

In the first animated version of D.Gray-man, Allen is voiced by Sanae Kobayashi, whom Hoshino praised for capturing the character.^{[vol. 9:187]} During the recording of the anime, Kobayashi befriended the Earl's voice actor Junpei Takiguchi, much to Hoshino's surprise.^{[vol. 11:76]} Kobayashi described Allen as an appealing character who, while not looking like a fighter, is interesting. Kobayashi aimed to portray Allen properly because she feared her performance might make him appear childlike. She stated despite his peaceful demeanor, Allen often shows angry mannerisms when fighting, which allows her to relate to him. Once the series started airing, Kobayashi commented Allen, due to his interactions with other characters from the series, would mature during the narrative.

Kobayashi was replaced with Ayumu Murase tor its anime sequel, D.Gray-man Hallow. Murase said he had positive thoughts about his work, hoping it would appeal to the audience. During recordings of Hallow, Hoshino was surprised by Murase's work, finding him suitable for Allen. Murase's switching between two personalities—Allen and Nea D. Campbell—impressed the manga author, who thought at first Murase was using a machine to change the tone of his voice. Although Murase only appeared twice with the Millennium Earl in Hallow, his work left a positive impression. During a broadcast of Hallow, Hoshino made illustrations of Allen interacting with the Noah clan to support the actors. Hoshino's determination to develop Allen in the manga moved Murase and he felt a better impression of his character.

Allen is voiced by Todd Haberkorn for the two series' English-language dubs; according to Haberkorn, he enjoyed voicing the characterand once cosplayed as him.In 2016, Haberkorn said he would pierce his ears if he could voice Allen again.

=== Characterization and themes ===
Hoshino created the teenage Allen as a gentleman.Similar to other characters, Allen's beliefs and appearance suggest he is a Christian. Hoshino's illustration involving Allen often has threads covered with threads because she aims to show he is associated with God and is bound to exorcise Akumas.Despite his friendly demeanor, Allen is obsessed with the idea of exorcising demons and does not care for his own wellbeing, often clashing with the Black Order. As time passes, his characterization changes; Hoshino wrote an interview between the character and herself. In the interview, she complained to Allen about his change from "pure and innocent" to a "corrupted" character, calling him "Dark Allen". "Allen" replied the change must be due to the series' dark setting.^{[vol. 9:191]} His true innocence is claimed to be symbolic of his selfish way of acting as a pacifist while fighting. Rather than killing Noah's descendants, Allen wishes to remove their dark personae.^{[ch. 116,117]}

Allen shows a more aggressive side of his persona when Cross Marian tells he will become the 14th Noah. Because Allen was taught by his adoptive father Mana to walk his path, on his own, Allen becomes confused and hits his master. Cross Marian says Allen is acting like his former self and that his formal mannerism is a result of trying to deal with Mana's death.While creating the character, Hoshino was afraid readers might dislike Allen because she wrote him as a hypocrite; Allen is human but he has sympathy for his enemies, the souls trapped inside the Akumas and the Noah clan. Hoshino did not like Allen because of his negative actions despite his caring words. She wondered whether readers would care about a protagonist who is friendly with both his friends and his enemies. Despite her worries, Hoshino's editor said it would be positive if Allen remained a hypocrite until the ending. Despite difficulties in writing him, Hoshino liked the challenge, expecting future manga protagonists would also provide authors with this problem.

When Allen leaves the Order, Hoshino says the character became difficult to write. Allen is a philanthropist; Hoshino said she was not equally kind. Because Jump Square—the manga's host magazine at the time—was aimed at a young male audience, Hoshino said she wanted to characterize Allen as a cheerful person rather than a troubled teenager. She found this depiction difficult because his life became more complicated as the series progressed. Hoshino tries to balance Allen between "strength and sorrow", and has needed occasional breaks. She said the most-challenging part of Allen's face to draw is his smile; he often smiles, sometimes when he is lying or unhappy. After Allen leaves the Order, Hoshino told readers his life might be arduous and that he would cheat at gambling, a skill he learned while training with Cross Marian. As the plot progressed, Hoshino still found difficulties writing Allen because he was suffering while remaining cheerful. Chapter 222 proved more challenging for Hoshino because Allen's life was becoming difficult. During these moments, Allen's mind starts being erased from his body because he is being possessed by Noah Nea D. Campbell. In an inner world, Allen feels he wishes to be erased and freed of pain while interacting with an illusion of Cross Marian. He remembers his beliefs and smiles at Cross's illusion despite crying at the same time.

== Appearances ==
=== Role in D.Gray-man ===
Allen was born with a deformed left arm caused by the effects of a rare object known as Innocence. He was abandoned by his parents and raised in a circus, where he meets Mana Walker. After an Akuma destroys the circus, the child adopts the name Allen from Mana's dog, his only friend. In the manga, it is revealed Mana died years after adopting Allen. Allen tries to resurrect Mana through a man known as the Millennium Earl. Mana is revived as an Akuma demon and cuts Allen's left eye. Allen's deformed left arm awakens, becomes an anti-Akuma weapon later called "Cross" (十字架, Kurosu; クロス lit. "Cross Stand"), and destroys Mana. His left eye allows him to see the souls of Akuma. Allen is estimated to be 15 years old when the series begins.^{[vol. 1:61]} He is often accompanied by Timcampy, a small flying golem his mentor Exorcist General Cross Marian gave him.^{[ch. 1]} Allen is sent to Black Order headquarters after finishing his exorcism training.^{[ch. 7]} With his new colleagues, he goes on missions to recover other lost innocences. He fights the Millennium Earl, his army of Akuma and the Noah Family—a group of immortal humans who help the Earl and want to destroy the world.^{[ch. 8, 19]} Allen and four other exorcists are sent to locate and protect Cross.^{[ch. 29]} When Allen leaves the group to save a traitor from the Black Order,^{[ch. 53]} a Noah (Tyki Mikk) nearly kills him.^{[ch. 56]} Allen stays at the Black Order's Asia Branch headquarters to recover from the experience.^{[ch. 57,59]}

During his stay at the headquarters, Allen's Innocence is restored when he wants to restore his own humanity through interacting with the Black Order exorcists rather than dedicating himself to the Akumas. This causes Cross to become the Crowned Clown (神ノ道化, Kuraun Kuraun; クラウン・クラウン lit. "Clown of God"), a cape-like armor.^{[ch. 187]} Allen rejoins his comrades in Edo,^{[ch. 85, 89]} where the group is trapped in a dimension known as Noah's Ark. Allen and his friends fight the Noah while trying to escape. In his rematch with Tyki, Allen changes his left arm into a sword that exorcises evil and is labeled Sword of Exorcism (退魔ノたいま剣, Taimaken; lit. "Repelling Demon's Sword").^{[ch. 116, 117]} When Cross reappears in the Ark, he makes Allen touch a piano to restore the fallen area. Returning to headquarters, Allen's loyalty is questioned and he is given an inspector, Howard Link.^{[ch. 136, 137]} The Noah then send Akumas to eliminate the Order; Allen and the Generals eliminate the Akumas but the evolved Level 4 Akuma defeats them.^{[ch. 140, 145]} Allen rejoins the fight with the help of his master and Lenalee Lee; they eliminate the Akuma.^{[ch. 155]} Shortly afterward, Allen learns he is the host of the late 14th Noah Nea D. Campbell, a man who is also Mana's late brother. Before his death, Nea implanted his memories into Allen so he would be reborn.^{[ch. 167]} All exorcists are ordered to kill Allen before he becomes a Noah.^{[ch. 170]} Allen controls his body but he begins turning into Nea; the Sword of Exorcism hurts him, despite it only affecting Noah and Akuma.^{[ch. 182, 184]}

During a fight against the Noah, Allen betrays his superiors by freeing Kanda and the Akuma of his friend Alma Karma. Link imprisons Allen, who fears the reappearance of Nea.^{[ch. 201]} Allen is attacked by Apocryphos, a sentient Innocence that tries to assimilate Allen's Innocence alongside the Noah.^{[ch. 203]} Two Noahs and Link rescue Allen, making the Order believe he has betrayed them.^{[ch. 204]} Allen refuses help from the Order and the Noah but promises Lenalee he will remain an exorcist.^{[ch. 205]} Allen goes into hiding and disguises himself as a clown. His former comrades and the Noah seek him.^{[ch. 212 ,216]} Allen's mind begins to leave his body due to Nea's awakening; a Cross illusion tells him to meet Katerina Eve Campbell to learn the truth behind Nea and Mana.^{[ch. 222]} After finding himself with Kanda in the circus where he was adopted, Allen tells Kanda how he met Mana, which Kanda finds suspicious and believes Mana never died. After reuniting with Link and Johnny, Allen learns from Nea Apocryphos altered Allen's original body and memories, and thus seeks a friend of Campbell to know his past self. Allen drinks a serum and remembers he was once a normal adult man who was tutored by Bookman Jr. and that he already made a contract with Nea. Years after, Apocryphos nearly kills Allen by resetting his growth, resulting in Bookman Jr. sacrificing his life to save Allen's until he became the young helper and Apcryphos' puppet.

=== In other media ===
Allen is a playable character in two D.Gray-man video games. He is a playable or support character in the crossover fighting video games Jump Super Stars, Jump Ultimate Stars and J-Stars Victory Vs, which pit Weekly Shōnen Jump characters against each other.

Allen also appears in Kaya Kizaki's D.Gray-man series of light novels. In the first novel, he searches for Black Order headquarters and then disappears. He kills Akuma and learns the Order's location from a woman named Mother. In the second novel, he is a supporting character who attends the Black Order's reunion party. Allen briefly appears in the first chapter of the third novel; he greets the Black Order scientist Rohfa, who is infatuated with him. The second chapter details his childhood in a circus, where he suffered abuse until he met Mana, whose dog was Allen's first friend.

=== Merchandise ===
Merchandise featuring Allen Walker includes key chains, plush dolls figurines, clothing and cosplay pieces; he has also been popular with cosplayers. New merchandise, in which Allen is often disguised as a vampire, was developed for Halloween 2016, and a piña colada drink was based on the character.

== Reception ==
Otakuzine regarded Allen Walker as one of the best exorcists in anime history for his caring nature, most notably because he wants to save the Akumas. The manga artist Osamu Akimoto told Hoshino he liked how Allen's design changes during the story, calling early designs as "cut" while later artwork makes him look more mature. Allen's redesign for Hallow received similar reactions from Amrita Aulakh of Pop Wrapped, who stated he is one of the best Shonen Jump protagonists alongside Gintoki Sakata from Gin Tama. In a retrospective of the series, Anime News Network noted while Allen has one of the saddest backstories in anime history, his relationship with the Black Order helps to give him a sense of happiness and newfound sense of home and family, helped furthermore by the episodes created exclusively by the anime adaptation. The writer said Allen's story becomes sadder as the narrative progresses.

Manga, anime, video-game and related media publications have praised and criticized Allen Walker; Sheena McNeil of the online magazine Sequential Tart enjoyed his design, finding it unique for a shōnen manga character. Active Anime's Sandra Scholes found Allen mysterious, citing his arrival at the Black Order and the anti-Akuma weapon. Critics have noted Allen's interactions with other characters during the series, such as his relationship with his partner Kanda. Both IGN and The Escapist said he is a likable leading character.

Artur Lozano Mendez from Autonomous University of Barcelona said Allen is similar to Noah from The Case Study of Vanitas and Alphonse Elric from Fullmetal Alchemist due to his kind personality, which makes him Kanda's opposite due to the latter's violent attitude. In "Portrait de l’adolescent en Héros à la cicatrice", multiple writers studying clinical psychology said there is a tendency in manga aimed at a young demography to feature heroes with noticeable scars. Rather than making Allen look like a hero, the protagonist' mark is a cross-like stigmata, a scar-tattoo on the left eye reveals the Akuma he fights across the series. Despite the scar's usefulness, Allen's mark remains a curse, reminding him of his traumatic childhood.

In the book Representing Multiculturalism in Comics and Graphic Novels, Jacob Birken wrote Allen's use of his powers illustrates the series' theme of identity; although Allen seems to become more human through his Innocence, the revelation he is connected with his enemies generates a major contrast to other exorcists' arcs and other, more-common anime characters. This is mostly due to Allen's transformation into the 14th Noah; Anne Lauenroth of Anime News Network said the revelation has a powerful effect on Allen because of his future and because he starts doubting his guardian Mana ever loved him and is devastated by this revelation. According to Osborn, Allen becomes "an increasingly more complex and interesting character" following his clashes with Nea. His eventual escape from the Black Order leads to a farewell scene with Lenalee that has been described as one of the season's best scenes because of the way it was directed, noting Allen's growth and the apparent romantic tone between the characters.
