= Goo (search engine) =

Japanese search engine and web portal

The Goo logo in May 2023

Goo (stylized in lowercase) is an Internet search engine (powered by Google) and web portal based in Japan, which is used to crawl and index primarily Japanese language websites (before switching to Google). Goo is operated by the Japanese NTT Resonant, a subsidiary of NTT Communications. The name is derived from the phrase, "global network continues to expand to infinity ∞". The site's mascot is a goat named Megu-tan.

== History ==
=== Commercial operation ===
NTT-X was established as an operating company in 1999, and goo began full-fledged operation. In May goo started "goo shop", a shopping mall, a tie-up with Recruit, a joint project with Nikkei Newspaper Inc., an Internet research project jointly with Mitsubishi Research Institute, further enhanced as a portal. Goo's most popular service, "goo dictionary" started as the portal's free dictionary service in partnership with Sanseido. It was then working with rival Yahoo! JAPAN. Goo search results were displayed on Yahoo! JAPAN where there was no applicable search result. In 2004 and beyond, the search engine and information provision service of the portal site of the NTT provider such as OCN, Plala, WAKWAK, etc. are often using goo's search engine.

In 2001, Goo opened a child-friendly counterpart to its search engine known as Kids Goo (キッズgoo). However, this service was closed on March 31, 2017.

"Teach me! Goo" was a user participation type Q & A site, 2.88 million monthly visitors (as of January 2007), formerly partnered with "OK Wave".

Other services included "environmental goo", goo blog, content distribution of the former BROBA. Goo was operated by 300 people as of 2015.

On April 14, 2025, Goo announced that "Oshiete! Goo", a Q&A website, and "Goo Blog", a blog hosting service, will be closed on September 17 and November 18 respectively. "Oshiete! Goo" launched in 2000, while "Goo Blog" launched in 2004. In May, Goo announced that "Goo Dictionary", running since 1999, will be closed on June 25, 2025.

=== Domain dispute ===
Popcorn, of Kurashiki City in Okayama Prefecture, acquired the domain name goo.co.jp in August 1996. Although the domain acquisition at that time had been operating as a non-adult site where the schoolgirl on the theme, goo.ne.jp became famous. In 1999 an adult site opened at that address. In November 2000 NTT-X, then goo's operating company filed a request to the Industrial Property Arbitration Center (currently the Japan Intellectual Property Arbitration Center) to relocate the domain, and in January 2001 the centre ordered the transfer of the domain. Popcorn complained about this and raised an application for domain usage to the Tokyo District Court in opposition to NTT-X in February 2001. The Tokyo District Court offered in April 2002 a ruling to dismiss Popcorn's claims. The appeal was rejected.

== See also ==
- Comparison of web search engines
- List of search engines
- Timeline of web search engines
