= List of D.Gray-man chapters =

The cover of the first tankōbon released in Japan by Shueisha on October 4, 2004, featuring Allen Walker and the Earl of Millennium

The chapters of the Japanese manga D.Gray-man are written and illustrated by Katsura Hoshino. The series began serialization in Shueisha's Weekly Shōnen Jump on May 31, 2004, and then serialized in Shueisha's monthly Jump Square manga magazine. The D.Gray-man manga series follows the adventures of Allen Walker, an Exorcist who uses the power of a divine weapon called "Innocence", and his comrades in the Black Order as they fight against the akuma, demons created from human souls by an ancient sorcerer known as the Earl of Millennium, who plans to destroy all of humanity.

Since its premiere, over two hundred chapters have released in Japan. The series was put on hiatus twice due to Hoshino falling ill, but the series continued a few weeks after each incident. In November 2008, Weekly Shōnen Jump announced that Hoshino was again putting the series on hold, due to an injured wrist. Publication resumed on March 9, 2009. The series once again went on hiatus starting May 11 of the same year. One chapter of the series was published in Akamaru Jump in August 2009 as the series transitioned to serialization in Jump Square, starting on November 4, 2009, but went on hiatus again on January 4, 2013. The manga began serialization again on July 17, 2015, in the quarterly published Jump SQ.Crown. Jump SQ.Crown ceased publication in January 2018, and D.Gray-man continued publication in Jump SQ.Rise.

The individual chapters are published in tankōbon by Shueisha. The first volume was released on October 4, 2004, and as of July 4, 2025, twenty-nine volumes have been released. The manga has been adapted into an anime series by TMS Entertainment and Dentsu, premiering on TV Tokyo on October 3, 2006. A sequel, D.Gray-man Hallow, premiered in July 2016.

The manga series has been licensed for an English-language release in North America by Viz Media. Viz released the first collected volume of the series on May 2, 2006, and, as of November 14, 2023, twenty-eight volumes have been released. Individual chapters of the series are called nights (e.g. "The 32nd Night"), and the volume name is merely a phrase at the top of the back cover.

== Volumes ==
No.	Title	Original release date	English release date
1	Opening	October 4, 2004; 978-4-08-873691-4	May 2, 2006; 978-1-4215-0623-4
001. "Opening" (opening(オープニング), Ōpuningu); 002. "A Full Moon Night" (満月の夜, Mangetsu no Yoru); 003. "The Pentacle" (ペンタクル, Pentakuru); 004. "Decision and Beginning" (覚悟と始まり, Kakugo to Hajimari); 005. "The Black Order" (黒の教団, Kuro no Kyōdan); 006. "Admittance to the Castle" (入城, Nyūjō); 007. "Revelation and Destiny" (判明と行く先, Hanmei to Yukusaki)
After his training under Cross Marian in order to become an Exorcist, a clergyman who uses unique weapons to fight Akuma, Allen Walker travels to Great Britain to the headquarters of the Black Order, an organization of Exorcists created by the Vatican. On arriving in Britain, Allen destroys multiple Akuma, explaining to those nearby that they are created by the Millennium Earl from the souls of the deceased when their loved ones curse God for their loss. At the headquarters of the Black Order, Allen is introduced to the other Exorcists by Komui Lee. Komui explains to him that the weapon he uses to fight Akuma is called Innocence, and that the Black Order is searching for the remaining pieces of Innocence in order to defeat the Earl of Millennium.
2	Old Man of the Land and the Aria of the Night Sky; Tsuchi Okina to Kūya no Aria (土翁と空夜のアリア)	December 27, 2004; 978-4-08-873760-7	August 1, 2006; 978-1-4215-0624-1
008. "Start of the Mission" (任務開始, Ninmu Kaishi); 009. "Old Man of the Land and Aria of the Night Sky (Part 1)" (土翁と空夜のアリア①, Tsuchi Okina to Kūya no Aria 1); 010. "Old Man of the Land and Aria of the Night Sky (Part 2)" (土翁と空夜のアリア②, Tsuchi Okina to Kūya no Aria 2); 011. "Old Man of the Land and Aria of the Night Sky (Part 3)" (土翁と空夜のアリア③, Tsuchi Okina to Kūya no Aria 3); 012. "Old Man of the Land and Aria of the Night Sky (Part 4)" (土翁と空夜のアリア④, Tsuchi Okina to Kūya no Aria 4); 013. "Old Man of the Land and Aria of the Night Sky (Part 5)" (土翁と空夜のアリア⑤, Tsuchi Okina to Kūya no Aria 5); 014. "Old Man of the Land and Aria of the Night Sky (Part 6)" (土翁と空夜のアリア⑥, Tsuchi Okina to Kūya no Aria 6); 015. "Old Man of the Land and Aria of the Night Sky (Part 7)" (土翁と空夜のアリア⑦, Tsuchi Okina to Kūya no Aria 7); 016. "Old Man of the Land and Aria of the Night Sky (Part 8)" (土翁と空夜のアリア⑧, Tsuchi Okina to Kūya no Aria 8)
Allen is dispatched with Exorcist Yu Kanda to obtain an Innocence in Mater, a haunted town. On entering the town, they encounter a level two Akuma, powerful enough to overpower both of them. They manage to escape and locate the "Ghost of Mater", a doll animated by the Innocence. The doll, known as Lala, refuses to surrender the Innocence to them until the death of Guzol, a man she has cared for. Despite Kanda's protests, Allen agrees to her request, but they are attacked by the Akuma, who takes the Innocence from Lala. Allen's rage causes his Innocence to evolve, and he and Kanda defeat the Akuma. Allen returns the Innocence to Lala, and retrieves it from her after Guzol dies.
3	The Rewinding City; Makimodoshi no Machi (巻き戻しの街)	March 4, 2005; 978-4-08-873784-3	November 7, 2006; 978-1-4215-0625-8
017. "The Black Order Annihilation Incident" (黒の教団壊滅事件, Kuro no Kyōdan Kaimetsu Jiken); 018. "The Black Order Annihilation Incident Amended: The Black Order Attempted Annihilation Incident" (黒の教団壊滅事件改め黒の教団壊滅未遂事件, Kuro no Kyōdan Kaimetsu Jiken Aratame, Kuro no Kyōdan Kaimetsu Misui Jiken); 019. "The Rewinding City" (巻き戻しの街, Makimodoshi no Machi); 020. "Useless" (役立たず, Yakutatazu); 021. "Contact" (接触, Sesshoku); 022. "Human" (人間, Ningen); 023. "Akuma" (悪魔); 024. "Miranda Lotto's Invocation" (ミランダ・ロットーの発動, Miranda Rottō no Hatsudō); 025. "Regenerate" (再生, Saisei); 026. "As Snow Falls Over the City" (街に雪が降り, Machi ni Yuki ga Furi)
Allen and Exorcist Lenalee Lee investigate a "Rewinding City" where time repeats, causing the events of a single day to replay endlessly. In the city, they meet Miranda Lotto, the only resident able to notice the strange occurrences, and whose clock may be the Innocence causing them. Allen and Lenalee try to stop time from repeating, but encounter several level two Akuma and a human girl who works with them, Road Kamelot of the Noah Family. After Lenalee is knocked unconscious and Allen loses his left eye, the Innocence in her clock appears to Miranda, allowing her to reverse time and events for a short while. Able to fight once more, Lenalee and Allen destroy the Akuma, and Road disappears, vowing to meet them again. With the natural flow of time restored, Miranda joins the Black Order.
4	Carnival; Gensui no Kikyū (元帥の危急)	May 2, 2005; 978-4-08-873810-9	February 6, 2007; 978-1-4215-0623-4
027. "Slump" (不審, Fushin); 028. "Uniform" (団服, Danpuku); 029. "Crisis of the Generals" (元帥の危急, Gensui no Kikyū); 030. "Missing in Action" (行方不明, Yukue Fumei); 031. "Vampire of the Castle (1) – The Mysterious Emissary" (孤城の吸血鬼①―謎の使者―, Kojō no Kyūketsuki 1 -Nazo no Shisha-); 032. "Vampire of the Castle (2) – Exorcist vs. Vampire" (孤城の吸血鬼②―エクソシストVS吸血鬼―, Kojō no Kyūketsuki 2 -Ekusoshisuto VS Kyūketsuki-); 033. "Vampire of the Castle (3) – Krory Castle" (孤城の吸血鬼③―クロウリー城―, Kojō no Kyūketsuki 3 -Kurourī Jō-); 034. "Vampire of the Castle (4) – The Hated One" (孤城の吸血鬼④―嫌われ者―, Kojō no Kyūketsuki 4 -Kiraware Mono-); 035. "Vampire of the Castle (5) – Eliade" (孤城の吸血鬼⑤―エリアーデ―, Kojō no Kyūketsuki 5 -Eriāde-); 036. "Vampire of the Castle (6) – Return" (孤城の吸血鬼⑥―帰還―, Kojō no Kyūketsuki 6 -Kikan-)
While recovering from his last mission, Allen meets Bookman, the chronicler of the war between the Black Order and the Earl of Millennium, and his successor Lavi. Allen is told about the Heart of Innocence, a special Innocence that could win the war for the Black Order, and how the Earl has begun his search by attacking the Generals of the Black Order. Allen, Lenalee, Lavi, and Bookman are sent to search for and protect General Cross. While attempting to locate Cross, Allen and Lavi meet Arystar Krory, a vampire who once encountered the General. Due to the Innocence in his teeth, Krory drinks the blood of Akuma, namely Eliade, an Akuma in disguise with whom Krory has fallen in love. Refusing to admit that Krory is an Exorcist, Eliade attempts to kill Allen and Lavi to keep Krory at her side.
5	Announcement; Yokaku (予覚)	July 4, 2005; 978-4-08-873832-1	May 1, 2007; 978-1-4215-1053-8
037. "Vampire of the Castle (7) – Merge" (孤城の吸血鬼⑦―合流―, Kojō no Kyūketsuki 7 -Gōryū-); 038. "Vampire of the Castle (8) – Broken Hearts, Broken Roses" (孤城の吸血鬼⑧―愛、薔薇薔薇―, Kojō no Kyūketsuki 8 -Ai, Barabara-); 039. "Vampire of the Castle (9) – Affection" (孤城の吸血鬼⑨―コイ―, Kojō no Kyūketsuki 9 -Koi-); 040. "Vampire of the Castle (10) – A Reason" (孤城の吸血鬼⑩―理由―, Kojō no Kyūketsuki 10 -Riyū-); 041. "Omen" (予覚, Yokaku); 042. "Three Men and a Child" (三人の男と一人の子供, Sannin no Otoko to Hitori no Kodomo); 043. "Laughing Out Loud" (呵呵大笑, Kaka Taishō); 044. "Number on the Desktop" (机上の数字, Kijō no Sūji); 045. "Signs" (sign(サイン), Sain); 046. "News of Cross Marian" (クロス・マリアンの訃音, Kurosu Marian no Fuin)
After Allen and Lavi reveal Eliade as an Akuma, she is slain by Krory. Krory agrees to become an Exorcist and joins Allen and Lavi on their search for Cross. They begin to travel to China to meet Lenalee and Bookman and encounter a group of travelers, one of whom is revealed to be the Noah Tyki Mikk. Arriving in China, the search party learns that Cross recently left for Edo, but his ship has been lost at sea. Nevertheless, the group of Exorcists prepare to sail to Edo, certain that Cross survived. Before setting sail, a swarm of Akuma appears, but flies past the Exorcists' ship.
6	Delete; Derīto (削除)	October 4, 2005; 978-4-08-873865-9	August 7, 2007; 978-1-4215-1054-5
047. "Point of the Attack" (来襲の目的, Raishū no Mokuteki); 048. "Memories of the Dark" (常闇の記憶, Tokoyami no Kioku); 049. "Sin" (罪, Tsumi); 050. "Voices of Comrades" (仲間の声, Nakama no Koe); 051. "Lost Sheep" (Lost sheep(ロスト シープ), Rosuto Shīpu); 052. "Beginning of the Night of the End" (終わりの夜のはじまり, Owari no Yoru no Hajimari); 053. "The Last Words of Suman Dark" (スーマン・ダーク最期の言葉, Sūman Dāku Saigo no Kotoba); 054. "Rend Allen's Heart" (rend Allen's heart(レンド アレンズ ハート), Rendo Arenzu Hāto); 055. "Delete" (削除(デリート), Derīto); 056. "Nightmare" (悪夢(ナイトメア), Naitomea)
The swarm of Akuma heads for an Exorcist named Suman Dark, who has betrayed his Innocence by revealing the names and whereabouts of his comrades to Tyki. As a result, he has turned into a Fallen One, and is being destroyed by his Innocence. Allen and Lenalee struggle to save Suman, and Allen pushes his Innocence to its limits to save Suman's body. However, Suman's mind has been broken by the experience, and is subsequently destroyed by Tease, Tyki's man-eating butterflies. Unable to move because he has used the full power of his Innocence, Tyki destroys Allen's Innocence and punctures his heart.
7	Crossroad; Toki no Hakaisha (時の破壊者)	December 26, 2005; 978-4-08-873888-8	November 6, 2007; 978-1-4215-1055-2
057. "Crossroads" (crossroad(クロスロード), Kurosurōdo); 058. "Destroyer of Time" (時の破壊者, Toki no Hakaisha); 059. "White Heartbeats" (白の鼓動, Shiro no Kodō); 060. "The Sworn Path" (誓いの道, Chikai no Michi); 061. "Left Arm" (左腕, Hidariude); 062. "Operation" (作戦, Sakusen); 063. "Dark and Stormy Skies" (暗雲の空, An'un no Sora); 064. "Level 3" (レベル3, Reberu 3); 065. "Title" (｢題名(タイトル)...｣, Taitoru...); 066. "From Sea and Clouds" (海と雲から, Umi to Kumo kara)
Lenalee and Lavi search for Allen, but find nothing before they are called back to the ship. Sammo Han Wong from the Asia Branch of the Black Order informs them that Allen cannot continue traveling with them and introduces Miranda as his replacement. She uses her Innocence to repair the ship long enough to complete the trip to Edo. As they continue their voyage, Allen wakes up in the Asian Branch. When told he cannot continue living as an Exorcist, he pleads with the branch director Bak Chan to help him continue to be an Exorcist. Bak tells him his Innocence has not been destroyed and can be restored. As Allen repeatedly attempts to do so, the search party is attacked by a level three Akuma.
8	Crimson Snow; Messēji (メッセージ)	July 4, 2006; 978-4-08-874029-4	February 5, 2008; 978-1-4215-1543-4
067. "Unknown Phenomenon" (不明現象, Fumei Genshō); 068. "The Sinking Darkness" (沈む黒, Shizumu Kuro); 069. "When the World Ends" (世界が滅ぶということ, Sekai ga Horobu to iu Koto); 070. "Counterattack" (反撃, Hangeki); 071. "The Price of Destruction" (破壊の代価, Hakai no Daika); 072. "Disappearing from the Sea" (そして海から消えて, Soshite Umi kara Kiete); 073. "Crimson Snow" (crimson snow(クリムゾン スノウ), Kurimuzon Sunou); 074. "Ship in Ruins, Girl Missing" (船斑ぎ少女戻らず, Fune Modorogi Shōjo Modorazu); 075. "The Message" (メッセージ, Messēji); 076. "The Lost Released" (亡失(ロスト)解除, Rosuto Kaijo)
Lenalee battles the Akuma by herself and learns she is not powerful enough to defeat it. By using a maximum invocation of her Innocence and drawing out all of its power, she manages to defeat it, vanishing into the sea in the process. As Lavi searches for her, he encounters an Akuma carrying a large crystal. After realizing that Akuma is an ally, and the crystal is Lenalee's Innocence protecting her, they return to the ship, where the Exorcists speculate that Lenalee might possess the Heart of Innocence. The Akuma, modified by Cross to obey him, tells the search party to turn back. Before they can answer, the crystal disappears and releases Lenalee, who says they must continue. At the same time, Lenalee learns she can no longer use her Innocence. Because of Miranda's exhaustion, she cannot maintain the ship, and the Exorcists continue without Anita and her crew, who vanish into the sea.
9	Nightmare Paradise; Bokura no Kibō (僕らの希望)	November 2, 2006; 978-4-08-874293-9	May 6, 2008; 978-1-4215-1610-3
077. "Nightmare Paradise" (メア・パラダイス, Mea Paradaisu); 078. "The Judgment" (メッセージ フロム ジャッヂ, Messēji Furomu Jajji); 079. "Battle・Edo + China" (対戦・江戸+中国, Taisen・Edo + Chūgoku); 080. "White Confusion" (困惑の白, Konwaku no Shiro); 081. "Our Hope" (僕らの希望, Bokura no Kibō); 082. "And Then Allen Walked On" (そしてアレンは歩いていった, Soshite Aren wa Aruiteitta); 083. "Two Paths and Thorns in Between" (道と道 その間は棘, Michi to Michi, Sono Aida wa Ibara); 084. "Together With You" (キミと共に, Kimi to Tomo ni); 085. "To Enact Love During the Play" (その劇中でアイを演じる, Sono Gekichū de Ai o Enjiru); 086. "Around the Time You Fall Asleep" (そして眠りにつく頃に, Soshite Nemuri ni Tsuku Koro ni)
The group arrives in the Earl-controlled Edo. Meanwhile, Tyki, Skin Boric, David, and Jasdero, all Noah, meet the Earl on Noah's Ark to discuss the current situation as Road assists in building a new Ark. The Earl summons all the Akuma in Japan to one location, and Tyki orders one to use the Ark to travel to China and kill Allen. Although they are at a disadvantage in terms of numbers, the Exorcists launch an attack on the Earl. In China, the Akuma attack the defenseless Allen, who has not managed to reconstruct his Innocence. Fo, disguised as Allen, battles the Akuma to buy time. After Allen convinces Bak to let him fight, a new form of his Innocence, later dubbed Crown Clown, materializes. Allen defeats the Akuma with Crown Clown and takes the Ark to Edo as Kanda and his team enter the battlefield.
10	Noah's Memory; Noazu Memorī (ノアズ メモリー)	February 2, 2007; 978-4-08-874318-9	August 5, 2008; 978-1-4215-1937-1
087. "Tiedoll's Entry" (ティエドール、エントリー, Tiedōru, Entorī); 088. "The Villain Laughs" (悪役は笑い出す, Akuyaku wa Waraidasu); 089. "Tragicomedy" (トラジコメディー, Torajikomedī); 090. "The Final Bell Has Yet to Toll" (閉幕ベルはまだ鳴らない, Heimaku Beru wa Mada Naranai); 091. "A Key and Four Doors" (鍵と4つの扉, Kagi to Yottsu no Tobira); 092. "Skin Bolic's Room" (スキン・ボリック・ルーム, Sukin Borikku Rūmu); 093. "Noah's Memory, Part 1" (ノアズ メモリー・1, Noazu Memorī 1); 094. "Noah's Memory, Part 2" (ノアズ メモリー・2, Noazu Memorī 2); 095. "Noah's Memory, Part 3" (ノアズ メモリー・3, Noazu Memorī 3); 096. "Noah's Memory, Part 4" (ノアズ メモリー・4, Noazu Memorī 4); 097. "Noah's Memory, Part 5" (ノアズ メモリー・5, Noazu Memorī 5)
In an attempt to destroy the Exorcists, the Earl destroys Edo. However, they survive, and Lenalee's Innocence turns into a crystal to protect her, attracting the Earl's attention. He personally tries to destroy Lenalee, but is stopped by Allen. After the Noah escape, the Exorcists discuss their current situation. Lenalee is then kidnapped by Lero, the Earl's umbrella, and half the group chase after her and onto the Ark, which begins to crumble. However, Tyki hands them the key to the doors on the Ark and challenges the Exorcists to find the exit to the Ark before it is destroyed. The first door takes the group to Skin. Kanda tells the rest of the group to move on and battles Skin alone. After Skin unleashes his lightning powers on Kanda, Kanda uses the full power of his Innocence to defeat Skin. Victorious, Kanda collapses from exhaustion as the room collapses around him.
11	Fight to the Debt; Rūju no Butai (ルージュの舞台)	May 2, 2007; 978-4-08-874341-7	November 4, 2008; 978-1-4215-1998-2
098. "Twin's Room" (ツインズ・ルーム, Tsuinzu Rūmu); 099. "Debt Crisis" (借金クライシス, Shakkin Kuraishisu); 100. "Lost the Key?!" (Lost the key(ロスト ザ キー)...!?, Rosuto Za Kī); 101. "Jasdero and David" (ジャスデロとデビット, Jasudero to Debitto); 102. "Bad Game" (Bad game(バッド ゲーム), Baddo Gēmu); 103. "An Unruly Child" (an unruly child(アン アンルーリー チャイルド), An Anrūrī Chairudo); 104. "Believing Is Our Strength" (信じるという僕らの強さ, Shinjiru to iu Bokura no Tsuyosa); 105. "The Rouge Stage" (ルージュの舞台, Rūju no Butai); 106. "Crimson Shake" (crimson shake(クリムゾン シェイク), Kurimuzon Sheiku); 107. "What Flows Out of the Coffin..." (棺に伝うは..., Hitsugi ni Tsutau wa...)
The remaining Exorcists walk into another room, and encounter the Noah twins Jasdero and David. After taunting Allen by expressing their desire to kill Cross, they steal the key Tyki gave him and use illusions to obscure the key and themselves. As Lavi looks for the key, Allen and Krory try to find their opponents. After the two succeed in finding Jasdero and David, Lavi finds the key and the illusions disappear. Rebuked, the Noah combine in form called "Jasdevi" to increase their strength. Krory tells the group to move on and battles Jasdevi alone. As Krory's strength and supply of Akuma blood dwindles, he is overpowered by the Noah and locked in an iron maiden.
12	Fight to the Debt; Poker	August 3, 2007; 978-4-08-873691-4	February 3, 2009; 978-1-4215-2389-7
108. "Bloody Krory" (ブラッディ・クロウリー, Buraddi Kurourī); 109. "The Red Curtain Falls" (瞼を閉じ幕引きの赤, Mabuta o Toji Makuhiki no Aka); 110. "Sheep Soiree" (羊の晩餐会, Hitsuji no Bansankai); 111. "Dark Rhapsody" (闇色ラプソディー, Yami Iro Rapusodī); 112. "Poker" (Poker(ポーカー), Pōkā); 113. "Dangerous Sheep" (破壊的シープ, Hakaiteki Shīpu); 114. "Two Struggles" (亀裂チェリー, Kiretsu Cherī); 115. "Weak People" (ヨワキ ヒト, Yowaki Hito); 116. "The Transcendent One" (臨界者出現, Rinkaisha Shutsugen); 117. "Kindness and Strength" (優しさと強さと, Yasashisa to Tsuyosa to); 118. "The Devil Within" (魔−a devil(ア デビル)−, Ma -a Debiru-)
As Jasdevi leaves the crumbling room, he is attacked by a mannequin of blood, Krory's new technique. It quickly defeats Jasdevi, but Krory is unable to make it to the next room before it is destroyed. The remaining four members of the group meet Road and Tyki and learn Allen's Innocence may also be the Heart. Tyki fights Allen as Road traps Chaoji (the sole survivor of Anita's crew) and Lenalee and sends Lavi's mind to her dream world. Tyki overpowers Allen and damages his Innocence, which eventually recovers. Seeing that the Innocence will not be destroyed, Tyki creates a vacuum to destroy Allen's body. Allen pushes his Innocence to surpass 100 percent synchronization, the normal limits of an Innocence, and breaks free of the vacuum by materializing the "Sword of Exorcism". Wielding it, Allen seemingly destroys the Noah inside Tyki's body. A furious Road surrounds her foes with candle-like stakes and begins to destroy Lavi's mind.
13	The Voice of Darkness; Yami no Koe (闇の吟)	December 4, 2007; 978-4-08-874435-3	May 5, 2009; 978-1-4215-2599-0
119. "La + vi" (｢ラ｣+｢ビ｣, Ra+Bi); 120. "Fr + ie + nd" (｢ナ｣+｢カ｣+｢マ｣, Na+Ka+Ma); 121. "I" (｢オレ｣, Ore); 122. "Equal" (equal(イコール), Ikōru); 123. "The Voice of Darkness" (闇の吟, Yami no Koe); 124. "The Black Carnival" (ブラックカーニバル, Burakku Kānibaru); 125. "Destruction" (崩壊, Hōkai); 126. "Beside You" (傍ニ, Soba ni); 127. "The Appearance" (出現, Shutsugen); 128. "TWO" (TWO(トゥー), Tū)
Lavi struggles against his past self and illusionary copies of his friends in Road's dream world. Unable to strike them all down, he is defeated, and one of his personas from his past takes over his body. Allen is forced to fight Lavi until he regains control and defeats Road by stabbing her disguise in her dream world. As the room begins to crumble, the group moves toward the exit, but the exit is destroyed as they are attacked by Tyki, who has been consumed by the power of Noah inside of him. The transformed Tyki is too powerful for the Exorcists, but Cross appears and easily overpowers the Noah.
14	Song of the Ark; Minna ga Kaette Kitara (みんなが帰ってきたら)	March 4, 2008; 978-4-08-874486-5	August 4, 2009; 978-1-4215-2600-3
129. "Black and White 0°C" (黒白0°C, Kokubyaku 0-do); 130. "Eyes of Hatred" (憎悪の瞳, Zōo no Hitomi); 131. "The Pianist's Reflection" (奏者の影, Sōsha no Kage); 132. "Pianist?!!" (奏者!!?, Sōsha!!?); 133. "Homecoming" (みんなが帰ってきたら, Minna ga Kaette Kitara); 134. "The Ark's Destination" (方舟の行方, Hakobune no Yukue); 135. "Repose, Partly Cloudy" (安息時々曇り, Ansoku Tokidoki Kumori); 136. "Sheep and Dog" (羊と犬, Hitsuji to Inu); 137. "Orphan and Clown" (捨て子とピエロ, Sutego to Piero); 138. "The Clock Ticks On" (だが進む刻の針, Daga Susumu Toki no Hari)
Before Cross can finish Tyki, the Earl appears to rescue Tyki. As the final parts of the Ark crumble, Cross takes Allen and Lenalee to the Egg, or the central "plant" where all Akuma are produced. He sends Allen with Timcampy, Cross' golem, to a room containing a piano. With orders to stop the downloading of the Ark, Allen plays the piano using music Timcampy projects for him, although he is not aware of how he is playing it. Using the piano, the Ark is restored, and the fallen Exorcists are revived. The Exorcists regroup, use the Ark to travel to the Asian Branch, and then return to the Black Order headquarters. As they recover, the Generals and branch directors meet with an agent from the Vatican, Malcolm C. Rouvelier, who questions Cross about the "14th Noah" and Allen's ability to operate the Ark.
15	Black Star, Red Star; Honbu Shūgeki (本部襲撃)	June 4, 2008; 978-4-08-874528-2	November 3, 2009; 978-1-4215-2774-1
139. "Attack on Headquarters" (本部襲撃, Honbu Shūgeki); 140. "The Other Side of the Door" (扉の向こう, Tobira no Mukō); 141. "Allies" (味方, Mikata); 142. "Come On Now" (Come on now(カム オン ナウ), Kamu On Nau); 143. "Line of Sight" (シセン, Shisen); 144. "Black Star, Red Star" (ブラックスター・レッドスター, Burakku Sutā, Reddo Sutā); 145. "Darkness 4" (Darkness(ダークネス)...4, Dākunesu...4); 146. "Dark Child" (ダークチャイルド, Dāku Chairudo); 147. "Weapon of Carnage" (さつりくへいき, Satsuriku Heiki); 148. "The Call" (ヨビゴエ, Yobigoe); 149. "Lenalee's Progress" (あの日、少女は, Ano Hi, Shōjo wa)
The Black Order headquarters is attacked by the Noah Lulubell and a horde of Akuma sent to retrieve the Egg that the Black Order took from the Ark. Due to the presence of the four Exorcist Generals, Lulubell and the Akuma are defeated, and the Egg is destroyed before it can return to the Earl. However, a level four Akuma emerges in the headquarters and defeats Allen and the Generals while killing several members of the Black Order. Komui orders an evacuation as Rouvelier takes Lenalee to replace her Innocence and join the battle.
16	Blood & Chains; Next Stage	September 4, 2008; 978-4-08-874566-4	February 2, 2010; 978-1-4215-3038-3
150. "Blood & Chains" (血と鎖, Chi to Kusari); 151. "The God I Hate" (だいきらいなかみさまへ, Daikirai na Kamisama e); 152. "Until We Meet Again" (そして約束のコトバを交わしましょう, Soshite Yakusoku no Kotoba o Kawashimashō); 153. "Ready for Red" (アカノカクゴ, Aka no Kakugo); 154. "The Battle Lines Shift" (戦線ヘンドウ, Sensen Hendō); 155. "Echoes in the Long Morning" (長い朝に響く, Nagai Asa ni Hibiku); 156. "The Next Stage" (next stage(ネクスト ステージ), Nekusuto Sutēji); 157. "Recitativo" (レチタティーヴォ, Rechitatīvo); 158. "Evil Flower" (悪の花, Aku no Hana); 159. "A Stormy Move in the Wee Hours" (嵐の引っ越し 午前2時, Arashi no Hikkoshi, Gozen 2-ji); 160. "The Second Destruction of the Black Order" (黒の教団壊滅事件再び, Kuro no Kyōdan Kaimetsu Jiken Futatabi)
As the level four Akuma cannot be stopped, Komui orders an evacuation and goes to retrieve the Innocence from Hevlaska, the caretaker of the Innocence, who offers herself up as bait. As Rouvelier, Lavi, and Lenalee arrive at Hevlaska's location, the Akuma attacks Komui and later heads toward Lenalee, but is stopped by Allen. Lenalee manages to transform her Innocence into a new form and helps Allen fight the Akuma. When it tries to escape, the Akuma finds itself trapped by the Generals and is defeated. Some time after the battle, the Earl works on building a new Egg while Sheril Kamelot (a Noah Clansman who serves as a government minister) instigates a war between two nations to bring about new Akuma. After the attack, the Black Order begins to move to a new headquarters, but a disease created by Komui begins to affect all of the personnel of the Order.
17	Parting Ways; Shōtai (正体)	December 4, 2008; 978-4-08-874605-0	May 4, 2010; 978-1-42-153160-1
161. "Further Destruction of the Black Order" (黒の教団壊滅事件アゲイン, Kuro no Kyōdan Kaimetsu Jiken Agein); 162. "Return of Destruction of the Black Order" (黒の教団壊滅事件リターンズ, Kuro no Kyōdan Kaimetsu Jiken Ritānzu); 163. "Serious Destruction of the Black Order" (黒の教団壊滅事件シリアス, Kuro no Kyōdan Kaimetsu Jiken Shiriasu); 164. "For Real Destruction of the Black Order" (黒の教団ホントに壊滅, Kuro no Kyōdan Honto ni Kaimetsu); 165. "Rain" (雨, Ame); 166. "True Identity" (正体, Shōtai); 167. "Clues" (アンジ, Anji); 168. "Parting Ways" (ワカレミチ, Wakaremichi); 169. "There Was a Silence" (There was(ゼア ワズ) a silence(ア サイレンス), Zea Wazu A Sairensu); 170. "Ten Days Later..." (十日後..., Tōka Go...); 171. "Another Side" (ウラオモテ, Uraomote)
It is discovered that a ghost of a girl experimented on by the Order had Krory spread the disease. The ghost, not willing to be forgotten and unable to leave the building, prevents the headquarter's move. Komui tells her he will not forget anyone who has died for the Order. The antidote to the disease is administered, and the move is completed. At the new building, Allen has an audience with Cross where he learns Cross was asked to watch over Mana, the brother of a Noah traitor called the 14th, until the 14th returns. Allen is the host necessary for the 14th's revival. The 14th's memories inside Allen will erode him away until Allen kills someone he loves and becomes the 14th; because of this, he is a threat to the Order. A secret agent fatally shoots Cross, who subsequently disappears. Bookman believes that if Cross is still alive, he will not return, and Bookman and Lavi are in the same danger. Meanwhile, Malcolm receives a message confirming a fragment of the Akuma egg has reached the North American Branch.
18	Thief? Ghost? Innocence? Ronrī Bōi (ロンリーボーイ)	June 4, 2009; 978-4-08-874642-5	August 3, 2010; 978-1-42-153543-2
172. "A Message from G" (G(ジー)からの予告状, Jī kara no Yokoku Jō); 173. "Thief? Ghost? Innocence?" (コソドロ?ゴースト?イノセンス?, Kosodoro? Gōsuto? Inosensu?); 174. "The Possessed Inspector" (乗っ取られた監査官, Nottorareta Kansakan); 175. "Child of a Thief" (ドロボーのコドモ, Dorobō no Kodomo); 176. "The Barrier Battle" (結界(ヘキジ)の戦, Hekiji no Tatakai); 177. "Lonely Boy" (ロンリーボーイ, Ronrī Bōi); 178. "I'm Sorry" (ごめんなさい, Gomen Nasai); 179. "Timothy Innocence" (TIMOTHY INNOCENCE(ティモシー イノセンス), Timoshī Inosensu); 180. "Tsukikami Level 2" (憑神れべる《弐》, Tsukikami Reberu Ni); 181. "Red Natehatena" (緋粧ナテハテナ, Hishō Natehatena)
Allen, Kanda, Link and Noise Marie go to Paris when they learn that several of their comrades were arrested for robbing people under the name of Phantom Thief G. Having understood that G was possessing their friends, Allen's group decide to stop him. The police are informed that G plans to rob the Louvre and the Exorcists meet G there. Although they are unable to capture G, Marie is able to discover that his real identity is that of a boy named Timothy Hearst, who has the power of the Innocence. When they try to recruit Timothy into the Black Order to become an Exorcist, the town is attacked by level four Akuma, who want Timothy's Innocence. While Allen, Marie and Kanda fight the Akuma, Link tries to protect Timothy but is knocked out by level two Akuma. Before the Akuma kill his friends, Timothy uses his Innocence to fight the Akuma. Link helps him, but the Akuma is later defeated by a member from the Crow organization.
19	Born of Love and Hate; Seisen Buraddo (聖戦ブラッド)	December 4, 2009; 978-4-08-874675-3	November 2, 2010; 978-1-421-53773-3
182. "The Touch of Darkness" (Darkness Touch(ダークネス タッチ), Dākunesu Tatchi); 183. "Wash Your Face and You'll Be All Right" (顔を洗えばだいじょうぶ, Kao o Araeba Daijōbu); 184. "Neo-Plaster Cast" (ネオギプス, Neo Gipusu); 185. "Born of Love and Hate" (憎愛から生まるる, Zō Ai kara Umaruru); 186. "Illusion" (幻, Maboroshi); 187. "Party and Party" (Party and Party(パーティ アンド パーティ), Pāti Ando Pāti); 188. "Holy War Blood" (聖戦ブラッド, Seisen Buraddo)
After Allen and Kanda slay the level four Akuma, Timothy joins the Black Order. The Third Exorcists, half-Akuma Exorcists, are also sent to the Order. Some time later, the Noah Family appear in various parts of the world to kill all of the Exorcists. The Earl and some of the Noah attack the Black Order headquarters. The Noah knock Kanda unconscious and send him to the headquarters. They bring him to the sealed body of Alma Karma, who, like Kanda, is a Second Exorcist created by Central. As the Noah plan to make Alma kill the Black Order members, Allen enters the headquarters.
20	The Voice of Judah; Yuda no Koe (ユダの呼)	June 4, 2010; 978-4-088-74764-4	February 1, 2011; 978-1-421-53919-5
189. "The Voice of Judah" (ユダの呼, Yuda no Koe); 190. "Garden of Failed Flowers" (徒花の庭, Adabana no Niwa); 191. "Memory of Love" (アイの記憶, Ai no Kioku); 192. "The Apostle Revealed" (暴かれた使徒, Abakareta Shito); 193. "Friend" (friend(フレンド), Furendo); 193.5. "Friend" (friend(フレンド), Furendo) (Note: The letters for "friend" were mirrored vertically in the Japanese edition.)
The Millennium Earl introduces his entire family to the captured Black Order. A Noah named Wisely sends Kanda, Allen and a doll-like Road into Kanda's memories. Allen and Road watch as Kanda befriends Alma. They then witness the true nature of Second Exorcists, artificial apostles Central manufactured by transplanting the minds of deceased Exorcists into new bodies. After learning the truth about himself, Alma killed all the scientists of the Asian Branch. Alma wanted Kanda to die with him, but Kanda wanted to find the mysterious woman whom he loved in his previous life. Therefore, he killed Alma and continued living.
21	The Awakening of Alma Karma; Ritoru Gubbai (リトル グッバイ)	December 3, 2010; 978-4-08-870133-2	November 1, 2011; 978-1-421-54077-1
194. "The Awakening of Alma Karma" (アルマ＝カルマ覚醒, Aruma Karuma Kakusei); 195. "Ripples" (波紋, Hamon); 196. "Go!!" (行け!!, Ike!!); 197. "Passing Each Other By" (擦れ、違いて, Sure, Chigaite); 198. "The Truth of the Failed Flowers" (徒花の真実, Adabana no Shinjitsu); 199. "Little Goodbye" (リトル グッバイ, Ritoru Gubbai)
Fueled by his hatred of the Black Order, Alma transforms into an Akuma and obliterates the North American Branch. Meanwhile, the Alma Cells in all of the Third Exorcists turns them into monsters. Allen tries to stop an enraged Kanda from killing Alma, but he is attacked by Kanda and stabbed by his Innocence in the process. As a result, the 14th Noah Nea begins to awaken, but Mana's curse halts the transformation. Allen awakens to discover that Alma's soul is that of the woman Kanda loved. The dark matter inside of Alma begins to devour his soul, but Allen manages to use the Ark to transport Kanda and the dying Alma to Mater. Allen declares that he will not allow the Noah or the Black Order to interfere any longer.
22	Fate	June 3, 2011; 978-4-08-870240-7	July 3, 2012; 978-1-421-54210-2
200. "Seed of Destruction" (破滅の種子, Hametsu no Shushi); 201. "Desperate Sinner" (絶望の罪人, Zetsubō no Zainin); 202. "The Changing World" (変わる世界, Kawaru Sekai); 203. "Fate—Vision" (Fate(フェイト) -現-, Feito); 204. "Premonition of Parting" (別れの予感, Wakare no Yokan); 205. "My Home" (My home(マイホーム), Mai Hōmu)
Alma and Kanda arrive in Mater with the former dying. Allen tries to save Tokusa, a Third Exorcist, but he is bound by Link. He is then held captive at the Black Order for his previous actions. A Cardinal of the Black Order attacks Allen, and accidentally reveals that he was the one behind Cross's disappearance. Road and Tyki break into the Black Order to rescue Allen, and Tyki reveals that the Cardinal is a sentient Innocence known as an Apocryphos. Allen, Road and Tyki escape the prison, and Allen is officially classified as a Noah by the Order. Tyki leaves Allen and an unconscious Road so he can fight the Apocryphos. Allen creates his last Ark gate to leave the Black Order behind forever, disappearing after telling Lenalee he will always remain an Exorcist.
23	Searching for Allen Walker; Ayumi dasu Mono (歩みだすもの)	April 4, 2012; 978-4-088-70392-3	December 4, 2012; 978-1-421-55085-5
206. "Bonus Manga: Maria's Gaze" (番外編 マリアの視線, Bangaihen Maria no Shisen); 207. "Setting Out" (歩みだすもの, Ayumi dasu Mono); 208. "We Who Live in Struggle" (迷い生きる僕らは, Mayoi Ikiru Bokura wa); 209. "Searching for A.W.: Companions" (A.W(アレン ウォーカー)をたずねて・同行者, Aren Wōkā o Tazunete, Dōkōsha); 210. "Searching for A.W.: The Reason" (A.W(アレン ウォーカー)をたずねて・理由, Aren Wōkā o Tazunete, Riyū); 211. "Searching for A.W.: Reunion" (A.W(アレン ウォーカー)をたずねて・再会, Aren Wōkā o Tazunete, Saikai); 212. "Searching for A.W.: Calling You" (A.W(アレン ウォーカー)をたずねて・君を呼ぶ, Aren Wōkā o Tazunete, Kimi o Yobu); Bonus Manga – "Searching for A.W." (A.W(アレン ウォーカー)をたずねて, Aren Wōkā o Tazunete)
Allen arrives at his old caretaker's house. Three months later, Lenalee and Marie are on a mission in France and they happen to find Kanda. Kanda returns to the Order and receives Mugen, which transforms into a crystal type Innocence. Johnny decides to leave the Order in order to find Allen, and Kanda accompanies him. They eventually find Allen, but they are all attacked by Akuma. Allen's transformation into the 14th Noah begins once again, so Kanda and Johnny take him to a safe house. Kanda notices someone following them, and discovers that it is Link.
24	By Your Side; Kimi no Soba ni (キミの傍に)	November 1, 2013; 978-4-08-870539-2	August 5, 2014; 978-1-421-56312-1
213. "Searching for A.W.: The Hidden One" (A.W(アレン ウォーカー)をたずねて・秘める者, Aren Wōkā o Tazunete, Himeru Mono); 214. "Searching for A.W.: Awakening" (A.W(アレン ウォーカー)をたずねて・目覚め, Aren Wōkā o Tazunete, Mezame); 215. "Searching for A.W.: By Your Side" (A.W(アレン ウォーカー)をたずねて・キミの傍に, Aren Wōkā o Tazunete, Kimi no Soba ni); 216. "Searching for A.W.: Attack" (A.W(アレン ウォーカー)をたずねて・襲撃, Aren Wōkā o Tazunete, Shūgeki); 217. "Searching for A.W.: One Seat Empty" (A.W(アレン ウォーカー)をたずねて・One seat empty(ワン シート エンプティ), Aren Wōkā o Tazunete, Wan Shīto Enputi); 218. "Searching for A.W.: D" (A.W(アレン ウォーカー)をたずねて・「D(ディー)」, Aren Wōkā o Tazunete, Dī)
Nea briefly gains control of Allen's body but subsides when he notices Allen's Innocence. Allen attempts to run away so Johnny attaches handcuffs to him. The next day Johnny begins repairing broken items to make money, he takes Allen with him. Apocryphos attacks Kanda and Tim; Kanda is knocked unconscious and Tim is stabbed. Jasdevi appear and trap Apocryphos. Tiedoll finds Kanda and asks him to return to the Order to become a General. Allen searches for Apocryphos but is attacked by the Earl.
25	He Has Forgotten Love; Kare wa Ai o Wasureteiru (彼は愛を忘れている)	June 3, 2016; 978-4-08-870539-2	May 2, 2017; 978-1-4215-9270-1
219. "Searching for A.W.: He Has Forgotten Love" (A.W(アレン ウォーカー)をたずねて・彼は愛を忘れている, Aren Wōkā o Tazunete, Kare wa Ai o Wasureteiru); 220. "Searching for A.W.: He Closes His Eyes Tighter in a Vortex (A.W(アレン ウォーカー)をたずねて・彼は渦の中でいっそう目を瞑る, Aren Wōkā o Tazunete, Kare wa Uzu no Naka de Issō Me o Tsumuru); 221. "Searching for A.W.: Clownish Nonsense" (A.W(アレン ウォーカー)をたずねて・道化の戯れ言, Aren Wōkā o Tazunete, Dōke no Zaregoto); 222. "Searching for A.W.: Hypokrisis" (A.W(アレン ウォーカー)をたずねて・Hypokrisis(ヒポクライシス), Aren Wōkā o Tazunete, Hipokuraishisu)
The Earl encounters Allen who is fully possessed by Nea. Nea reveals to the Earl that they are not siblings but instead the reincarnations of the original Earl of the Millenium. He also addresses the current Earl as "Mana D. Campbell" which starts confusing the fake Earl. He then becomes antagonistic towards him. Just then, the Earl is attacked by agents from the Black Order. Link forces the Earl to attack and reveals to Nea he is his ally. Meanwhile, Allen's mind starts diseappearing from his body. An illusion Cross Marian tells him to meet a woman named Katerina Eve Campbell after hearing Allen's vow to learn the truth behind Mana and Nea.
26	Secrets and Remains; Himitsu to Nakigara (秘密と亡骸)	February 4, 2019; 978-4-08-881712-5	March 3, 2020; 978-1-9747-1073-7
223. "Searching for A.W.: To My Way" (A.W(アレン ウォーカー)をたずねて・To my way(トゥ マイ ウェイ), Aren Wōkā o Tazunete, Tu Mai Wei); 224. "Searching for A.W.: Call 1" (A.W(アレン ウォーカー)をたずねて・CALL(コール) 1, Aren Wōkā o Tazunete, Kōru 1); 225. "Searching for A.W.: Call 2" (A.W(アレン ウォーカー)をたずねて・CALL(コール) 2, Aren Wōkā o Tazunete, Kōru 2); 226. "Searching for A.W.: Live Man + Dead Man" (A.W(アレン ウォーカー)をたずねて・Live man + Dead man(ライブマナ アンド デッドマン), Aren Wōkā o Tazunete, Raibuman Ando Deddoman); 227. "Saying Farewell to A.W.: Secrets and Remains" (A.W(アレン ウォーカー)に別れを告げる・秘密と亡骸, Aren Wōkā ni Wakare o Tsugeru, Himitsu to Nakigara); 228. "Saying Farewell to A.W.: Poison and Sign" (A.W(アレン ウォーカー)に別れを告げる・毒と標, Aren Wōkā ni Wakare o Tsugeru, Doku to Shirube); 229. "Saying Farewell to A.W.: Concealment and Beloved Friend" (A.W(アレン ウォーカー)に別れを告げる・掩蔽と腹心, Aren Wōkā ni Wakare o Tsugeru, Enpei to Fukushin); 230. "Saying Farewell to A.W.: Lamp and Tears" (A.W(アレン ウォーカー)に別れを告げる・灯と涙痕, Aren Wōkā ni Wakare o Tsugeru, Tomoshibi to Ruikon)
As Mana escapes from the area, Nea is confronted by the other Noah. However, Allen manages to regain control of his body. Kanda and Tiedoll come to his aid while hiding him and Johnny from Tyki. Kanda reveals to Allen that Timcampy has been killed by Apocryphos forcing Allen to use the Ark to escape and have his revenge alone. Instead Kanda manages to track him down and Allen decides to team up with him. As the two are lost in Allen finds that recognizes they are in the city where he met Mana and befriend his dog, Allen.
27	Redarm and Pierrot; Akaude to Piero (赤腕とピエロ)	August 4, 2020; 978-4-08-882389-8	July 6, 2021; 978-1-9747-2279-2
231. "Saying Farewell to A.W.: Opening Act" (A.W(アレン ウォーカー)に別れを告げる・序幕, Aren Wōkā ni Wakare o Tsugeru, Jomaku); 232. "Saying Farewell to A.W.: Redarm" (A.W(アレン ウォーカー)に別れを告げる・赤腕, Aren Wōkā ni Wakare o Tsugeru, Akaude); 233. "Saying Farewell to A.W.: The Way of the Three" (A.W(アレン ウォーカー)に別れを告げる・The way of the three(ザ ウェイ オブ ザ スリー), Aren Wōkā ni Wakare o Tsugeru, Za Wei Obu Za Surī); 234. "Saying Farewell to A.W.: Observers" (A.W(アレン ウォーカー)に別れを告げる・監視者, Aren Wōkā ni Wakare o Tsugeru, Kanshisha); 235. "Saying Farewell to A.W.: Redarm and Dog" (A.W(アレン ウォーカー)に別れを告げる・赤腕と犬, Aren Wōkā ni Wakare o Tsugeru, Akaude to Inu); 236. "Saying Farewell to A.W.: Redarm and Pierrot" (A.W(アレン ウォーカー)に別れを告げる・赤腕とピエロ, Aren Wōkā ni Wakare o Tsugeru, Akaude to Piero)
Allen tells Kanda of his childhood where he used to work as aid in circus under the nickname of Red Arm. However, Red was subject of abuse of the staff, most notably Cosimov, for his deformed arm and their denial to feed the child. In the circus, Red befriended a dog named Allen owned by the pierrot Mana who suffered from depression and amnesia as a result of Nea's death and feared that his grief would cause the return of the Millenium Earl. A younger Cross Marian and Road looked after the two, although the former was confused with the fact that Red was a child rather than a person who was supposed to be an adult. Jealous of Mana's popularity, Cosimov kills Allen. When Allen is killed by the circus staff, Red grieves the pet as it was the only one who care for him. Mana then meets Red, overjoyed by the fact he was grieved his late pet in his place. Apocryphos then appears in the city.
28	Redarm and Mana; Akaude to Mana (赤腕とマナ)	October 4, 2022; 978-4-08-883268-5	November 14, 2023; 978-1-9747-4075-8
237. "Saying Farewell to A.W.: Redarm and Mana, Part 1" (A.W(アレン ウォーカー)に別れを告げる・赤腕とマナ①, Aren Wōkā ni Wakare o Tsugeru, Akaude to Mana 1); 238. "Saying Farewell to A.W.: Redarm and Mana, Part 2" (A.W(アレン ウォーカー)に別れを告げる・赤腕とマナ②, Aren Wōkā ni Wakare o Tsugeru, Akaude to Mana 2); 239. "Saying Farewell to A.W.: Redarm and Mana, Part 3" (A.W(アレン ウォーカー)に別れを告げる・赤腕とマナ③, Aren Wōkā ni Wakare o Tsugeru, Akaude to Mana 3); 240. "Saying Farewell to A.W.: Redarm and Mana, Part 4" (A.W(アレン ウォーカー)に別れを告げる・赤腕とマナ④, Aren Wōkā ni Wakare o Tsugeru, Akaude to Mana 4); 241. "Saying Farewell to A.W.: Redarm and Mana, Part 5" (A.W(アレン ウォーカー)に別れを告げる・赤腕とマナ⑤, Aren Wōkā ni Wakare o Tsugeru, Akaude to Mana 5); 242. "Saying Farewell to A.W.: Redarm and Mana, Part 6" (A.W(アレン ウォーカー)に別れを告げる・赤腕とマナ⑥, Aren Wōkā ni Wakare o Tsugeru, Akaude to Mana 6); 243. "Saying Farewell to A.W.: Redarm and Mana, Part 7" (A.W(アレン ウォーカー)に別れを告げる・赤腕とマナ⑦, Aren Wōkā ni Wakare o Tsugeru, Akaude to Mana 7); 244. "Saying Farewell to A.W.: Redarm and Mana, Part 8" (A.W(アレン ウォーカー)に別れを告げる・赤腕とマナ⑧, Aren Wōkā ni Wakare o Tsugeru, Akaude to Mana 8); 245. "Saying Farewell to A.W.: Redarm and Mana, Part 9" (A.W(アレン ウォーカー)に別れを告げる・赤腕とマナ⑨, Aren Wōkā ni Wakare o Tsugeru, Akaude to Mana 9)
Red befriends Mana who tells him of how he misses his brother, Nea. Planning to kill Mana, Apocryphos rewrites the memories of the circus employers, leading them to believe Red was the one who killed Allen and not Cosimov. Back in the circus, Cosimov has Allen's body removed from its grave, accusing Red for its death. Enraged by how the pet was treated, Red awakens his Innocence and tries to kill Cosimov. Mana tries to stop Red, claiming he should not kill anybody. In his rage and controlled by Apocryphos now, Red accidentally attacks Mana. This causes the return of the Millennium Earl who tries to take Mana in his grief. The Earl causes several casualties with his Akumas. Cross Marian appears and saves Red and Mana from the Earl and Akumas. Despite finding Red dangerous, Cross spares the child who recovers his senses and buries Allen. This attracts Apocryphos who decides to use Red as his new puppet.
29	Another Bookman Jr. Mō Hitori no BOOKMAN Jr. (もうひとりのBOOKMAN Jr.)	July 4, 2025; 978-4-08-884330-8	August 4, 2026; 978-1-9747-6588-1
246. "Saying Farewell to A.W.: Allen and Mana" (A.W(アレン ウォーカー)に別れを告げる・アレンとマナ, Aren Wōkā ni Wakare o Tsugeru, Aren to Mana); 247. "Saying Farewell to A.W.: Motives and Paths" (A.W(アレン ウォーカー)に別れを告げる・思惑と道, Aren Wōkā ni Wakare o Tsugeru, Omowaku to Michi); 248. "Saying Farewell to A.W.: Encounter" (A.W(アレン ウォーカー)に別れを告げる・接触, Aren Wōkā ni Wakare o Tsugeru, Sesshoku); 249. "Saying Farewell to A.W." (A.W(アレン ウォーカー)に別れを告げる, Aren Wōkā ni Wakare o Tsugeru); 250. "Unending Curse" (終わらぬ呪い, Owaranu Noroi); 251. "Zoogle Antiquarian Bookstore" (ズーグル古書店, Zūguru Kosho-ten); 252. "Another Bookman Jr." (もうひとりのBOOKMAN Jr.(ブックマン ジュニア), Mō Hitori no Bukkuman Junia); 253. "If Fate Wills It, We'll Meet Again, Part 1" (運命ならばいつかまた会える・前編, Unmei naraba Itsuka Mata Aeru, Zenpen); 254. "If Fate Wills It, We'll Meet Again, Part 2" (運命ならばいつかまた会える・後編, Unmei naraba Itsuka Mata Aeru, Kōhen); 253.5. "Silver Memories" (白銀の記憶, Hakugin no Kioku)
Following the fight in the circus, Red is shocked to find that his attack damaged Mana's mind and decides to live by his side forever when realizing he is now mistaking for the dog Allen. As Red takes the identity of Allen Walker under the belief that was Mana's last name until his death, Kanda doubts this story to the point he finds Mana's connections too convenient to stay dead and decides that he will check his grave with Tiedoll. Reunited with Link and Johnny, Allen is reminded of Katerine Eve Campbell's identity which causes him to ask about her from his caretalker Mother. While Kanda realizes that Mana is alive upon checking his grave, the Noah have their memory released by Wisely. Guided to bookstore Zoogle, Allen is greeted by a woman who makes him drink the Seed of Truth to remember his true identity. In his memories, Allen is portrayed as an ordinary man taught by his superior codenamed "Lavi". Nea met the original Allen on the brink of his death and made the contract. However, as years pass an adult Allen is injected with the Innocence by Apocryphos which causes his body to deage until Lavi intervenes.

== Chapters not yet in tankōbon format ==
The following chapters were serialized in issues of Jump SQ.Rise from July 2025 onwards, but have yet to be collected in tankōbon format.

- 255. "Protector of the Silver Radiance" (銀光の守りて, Ginkō no Mamorite)
- 256. "Witness to the End" (終わりを見届けるは, Owari o Mitodokeru wa)
- 257. "Encountering an Anomaly" (遭遇アノマリー, Sōgū Anomarī)
- 258. "The Campbell's Awaited Person" (キャンベルの待ち人, Kyanberu no Machibito)
