= Lavi (D.Gray-man) =

Fictional character from D.Gray-man

- D.Gray-man character
- Lavi by Katsura Hoshino
- First appearance: D.Gray-man manga chapter 26
- Created by: Katsura Hoshino
- Voiced by: Japanese; Kenichi Suzumura (D.Gray-man), Natsuki Hanae (D.Gray-man Hallow); English; Jason Liebrecht, Chris Patton
- Notable relatives: Bookman (guardian)

Lavi (Japanese: ラビ, Hepburn: Rabi), also known as Bookman Jr., is a fictional character from Katsura Hoshino's manga D.Gray-man. Lavi is a friendly exorcist in charge of slaying "Akumas", monsters created by the Millennium Earl who wishes to destroy humanity. Lavi is training to become "bookman", a person who records events from the entire history, such as wars between civilization and exorcists, without interfering with civility. However, he is caring when it comes to the Black Order's exorcists and works with them, bonding with most of them. He has also appeared in the series' two anime adaptations, light novels, and video games.

Lavi was based on the title character of Hoshino's one-shot manga, Bookman. Despite his lack of appearances in later parts of the story, where he mainly provides comic relief, Hoshino found the character easy to illustrate. In the Japanese version of the first anime he was voiced by Kenichi Suzumura, while in the sequel, D.Gray-man Hallow, the role was taken by Natsuki Hanae. He also shares two voice actors in the English dub: Jason Liebrecht and Chris Patton.

The character of Lavi has been well received by manga readers, placing third in each of D.Gray-man's popularity polls. Multiple types of merchandise based on him have been released. Critics have praised Lavi's characterization, mostly for his cheerful personality and his character arc, which involved creating bonds with the other exorcists that he is told not to befriend by Bookman, his mentor.

== Creation and design ==
Katsura Hoshino based Lavi's cheerful personality on main characters from her previous manga. Lavi was intended to be the protagonist of her planned series, Book-man. Since Hoshino liked the character, she added him to D.Gray-man. Hoshino had the character's backstory planned by the start of the series, but was uncertain of how and when to explain it in the serialization.^{[vol. 4]} In the manga's 119th chapter, "La"+"vi" (｢ラ｣+｢ビ｣ "Ra+Bi"), Hoshino wanted the cover to symbolize him, representing Lavi's mind through images including a coffin that contains books and an empty cage. Hoshino stated that Lavi has nothing inside him as a result of not wishing to interact with other characters, leading to the point the coffin was nearly empty. Hoshino stated that this cover was one of her favorites.

Lavi was designed to stand out within the other exorcists, resulting in him getting multiple accessories like a bandanna and a scarf. Hoshino designed him with "droopy eyes" and a cheerful disposition. Hoshino made to be a Lavi a pretty boy. His facial expressures were based on a real person Hoshino knew which was a scrapped idea planned for a minor character. She found Lavi easy to illustrate, specifically his drooping eyes which she regards as the most important part of his design. Designwise, Lavi was made to be the opposite of fellow character Yu Kanda but still felt the scarf might give her issues during drawings. However, she found it difficult to draw his smile due to his dark fate. Hoshino plans to write the truth behind Lavi's wish to become a Bookman and the reason why he wears an eyepatch. Lavi was going to have a bigger role in Alma Karma's story arc, but the large number of characters made this difficult. Hoshino was surprised by Lavi's popularity as he made it to the top ten from the last character poll despite his lack of appearances in later story arcs.

Lavi was voiced in Japanese by Kenichi Suzumura in the first D.Gray-man series. Suzumura was replaced by Natsuki Hanae in the sequel D.Gray-man Hallow. Hanae has said he is glad to play the role of Lavi since he has been reading the manga since he was a student. In English, he is voiced by Jason Liebrecht in episodes 13–26 and from episode 40 onward; Chris Patton assumed the role in episodes 27–39 while Liebrecht was recovering from a car accident.

== Appearances ==
=== In D.Gray-man ===
Lavi is a cheerful 18-year-old red-haired exorcist introduced in D.Gray-man's 26th chapter. He is being trained by Bookman and aims to become a bookman, a person who records the hidden history of the world, and has been trained from a young age to achieve that goal. He initially works alongside the Black Order only to be close to the events he must witness, but he slowly becomes more attached to his Black Order friends and his bookman priorities are clouded by his growing concern for them.^{[ch. 119]}^{[ch. 58]} His weapon, named Tettsui (鉄槌; lit. "Iron Hammer") and referred to as Ōzuchi Kozuchi (大槌小槌; lit. "Big Hammer, Little Hammer"), is capable of growing and extending to undefined sizes and lengths.^{[ch. 3]} It allows him to use "seals" that control several elements of nature.^{[ch. 72]} In his introduction, he quickly befriends the series' protagonist, Allen Walker, and they work together in two separate missions: a hunt for demons labelled as "Akuma" and an encounter with the Romanian "vampire" Arystar Krory III. Lavi and Allen become allies with Krory, who is later revealed to be an exorcist.^{[ch. 40]}

Shortly after meeting Krory, Lavi and Bookman join a group of exorcists to find the missing General Cross Marian, who is being targeted by the Millennium Earl's forces. During their journey to Japan, Allen is nearly killed in combat by Tyki Mikk, an immortal descendant from Noah aiding the Earl.^{[ch. 57]} Upon reaching Japan, Lavi tries to take revenge but learns that Allen has been recovering from the fight. Following the exorcists' reunion, Lavi is trapped alongside his allies within a dimension called Noah's Ark, where the exorcists must fight the Earl's allies in order to return home.^{[ch. 90]} During his battle against the Noah Road Kamelot, Lavi incinerates both his opponent and himself, but he is saved by Allen.^{[ch. 119]}^{[ch. 122]} Following the battle, the Ark collapses, but Cross Marian appears and makes Allen restore it.^{[ch. 132]}

The Noah Lulu Bell sends an army of Akuma to kill everybody in the Black Order. With his weapons broken, Lavi, along with Yu Kanda, aids wounded Allen and helps him face a highly evolved Akuma until they are saved by Lenalee Lee.^{[ch. 155]} Some time later, the Order and the Noah face each other again. Lavi and Bookman are kidnapped by the Clan of Noah, and parasites from the Noah were put into Lavi in an attempt to get Bookman to reveal information about the exiled 14th Noah, Nea D. Campbell.^{[ch. 207]}

=== In other media ===
Lavi also appears in the D.Gray-man light novels. He is the protagonist of one of the chapters from the second light novel, where he struggles to train to become the next Bookman before his introduction in the manga. He makes a minor appearance in the third novel, where he briefly interacts with the scientist Rohfa. He is also present in both action video games based on the first anime series as a playable character. Outside the D.Gray-man franchise, Lavi is present in the crossover video game Jump Super Stars and is mentioned in the animated adaptation of the manga Gin Tama as part of a misunderstanding involving a letter about him.

== Reception ==
Merchandise has been released based on Lavi, including figurines and keychains. In celebration of 2016's Halloween, new products involving Lavi were released in Japan, such as a vegetable juice. The character has ranked third in all D.Gray-man character popularity polls, behind Kanda and Allen. In a survey, Lavi was voted as the 4th best character voiced by Suzumura.

Critical response to Lavi's character has been positive. John Rose of The Fandom Post enjoyed Lavi's characterization and introduction due to his childish yet simultaneously mature personality. This left a good impression on the reviewer, who felt Hoshino kept creating appealing characters such as Lavi and Bookman. Rose also analyzed how Lavi befriends Allen in the story. Kimberly Morales of Animation Insider liked Lavi's character for not being allowed by Bookman to befriend other people, since he is supposed to be a neutral observer. Nevertheless, Lavi's introduction while aiding Allen during a fight against Akumas was notable according to the writer, despite that Lavi was the last protagonist to be introduced. Holly Ellingwood of Active Anime had a similar impression of the character due to how he aids the weakened Allen during the fight against the Akumas despite being unable to see them within crowds of people. Todd Douglass Jr. of DVDTalk enjoyed Lavi's first mission with Allen, due to the misunderstanding in which they believe Krory to be a vampire but learn over the course of the story that he is another exorcist. Yussif Osman of Japanator cited Lavi's backstory as an example of a "deep" element within the series, which made it stand out.

Manga Recon writers said that they considered Lavi, alongside Krory, one of the real heroes from the manga's 12th volume due to his actions against the Noah, Jasdevi. The reviewers also found his design much better than Allen's. Casey Brienza of Anime News Network (ANN) had mixed opinions of the presentation of Lavi's fight against the Noah Road Kamelot which, while it featured his character arc, was overshadowed by Allen's clash with Tyki Mikk. On the other hand, Ben Leary from the Fandom Post found Lavi's situation more enjoyable than the other fights from the same volume, but lamented it was not further explored in the book. IGN's Richard Osborn enjoyed Lavi's interactions with Allen and Lenalee Lee in Hallow's first episode as they created lighthearted moments in a dark story. Anne Lauenroth of ANN instead felt that Lavi's comments in Hallow's first episode might give a bigger insight into Allen's changing personality. Lauenroth also addressed Lavi's conflicted nature, initially believing that mankind will never change but developing across the story while befriending the exorcists. Animation Insider writers felt Jason Liebrecht did well voicing Lavi in the English dub of the series. However, Suzume Mizuno of DeCulture felt that changing Lavi's Japanese voice actors from Kenichi Suzumura to Natsuki Hanae might disappoint Hallow viewers due to the drastic change.
