= List of D.Gray-man characters =

Many of the Black Order members as they appear in the manga by Katsura Hoshino

The D.Gray-man anime and manga series features a cast of characters created by Katsura Hoshino. The series is set at the end of a fictional 19th century during which the Black Order searches for Exorcists, the "Apostles of God" chosen to wield a divine substance called Innocence. They are the only ones who can destroy Akuma, weapons created by the Millennium Earl from souls of the deceased when humans curse God for the loss of loved ones, and stop the Earl's plan to destroy humanity.

The series' main character is Allen Walker, a young Exorcist who trained under Exorcist General Cross Marian and is sent to officially join the Black Order. Early in the series, he is sent on missions with fellow Exorcists. He meets Yu Kanda, a cold and mysterious swordsman looking for a certain person from his past; the friendly Lenalee Lee, who has been an Exorcist her entire life; and Lavi, the cheerful and energetic future Bookman, chronicler of the secret history of the world. They travel the globe, retrieving the pieces of Innocence scattered during the Great Flood and recruiting new Exorcists while fighting the Earl and his Akuma. However, the Black Order soon learns the Earl has help in the form of the Clan of Noah, a group of thirteen super-humans who can destroy Innocence and claim to be the true "Apostles of God". Both groups quickly begin searching for the Great Heart, the most powerful Innocence that can strengthen or destroy all the others, to bring an end to the war.

Many of the series' characters are taken from Hoshino's previous one-shots, both published and unpublished. She also modeled characters on her friends and well-known people. Designing and illustrating most characters was often difficult due to their beauty as well as their personalities. Critical reception to these characters has been positive, with writers praising most of the cast members as well as their development. The antagonists received a similar response. However, initial chapters of the manga, or episodes of the anime, attracted some criticism as a result of some of the characters feeling generic. Critics praised the voice actors for both the Japanese series and the English dub.

== Creation and influence ==
Katsura Hoshino's Zone one shot featured many similar characters, especially Allen Walker, the Earl, Lenalee, and General Cross. Many other characters are also "leftovers" from previous, and sometimes unpublished works.^{[vol. 8:40]} Allen Walker, the series' main character is also based on the previous series' protagonist, who is a girl. Hoshino changed some of his characteristics to make him look more masculine.^{[vol. 1:62]} Hoshino says that she does not know where Allen's concept came from, since she likes her main characters to be rambunctious, rude idiots.^{[vol. 1:61]} Nevertheless, the character started behaving more informally across the series.^{[vol. 9:191]} In addition, Lavi was meant to be the protagonist of one of her planned series, Book-man.^{[vol. 4]} Other characters such as The Millennium Earl, Lenalee Lee and Komui Lee are based on real people, although Hoshino has not confirmed who they are. She has mentioned that some of them are famous scientists, while Komui is based on her boss.^{[vol. 1:112, 152, 172]} The character of Yu Kanda, based on a samurai, was created to vary D.Gray-man's Western setting. Hoshino found the design of some characters difficult early in the series. This resulted in Kanda having few appearances in the early volumes until the Noah's ark story arc, where he returned to join the cast with Allen having become harder to draw than him.^{[vol. 10:204]} On the other hand, she found the Millennium Earl and Reever Willingham easier to draw.

When designing the characters, Hoshino first imagines their lives even though some parts might not be featured in the story. Their personalities are then written down along with their habits or eating preferences. She has admitted she does not have written details about a number of D.Gray-man characters. Hoshino chose the title "D.Gray-man" for its multiple meanings, most referring to the state of Allen and the other main characters. The Akumas were inspired by 1973 film, The Exorcist which Hoshino admitted scared her when watching it. In Timcanpy's case, his design is based on the silver accessory brand Timcanpi.^{[vol. 3:124]} The character Bak Chan was created with the help of Kaya Kizaki, who wrote the D.Gray-man Reverse novels.^{[vol. 8:24]} Hoshino has revealed that she got most of her ideas for the series while asleep in the bath for six hours.^{[vol. 2:81]}

In designing the Black Order exorcist, Hoshino feels that their first uniforms were easy to draw so she like them. The second uniforms were brought the artist problems due to the idea of giving each the clothing zippers. For the third uniforms, the color remained black but Hoshino decided to them red too as a reference to blood because she thought such grotesque looks would fit the themes of D.Gray-man. In other early colored chapters, Hoshino experimented with giving Allen gothic lolita style clothing and color style referencing American comics. Other early colored illustrations were meant to give the idea of symbolism such Kanda's being seen as a puppet or Allen being covered by threads of Akuma and later the idea of his Innocence returning to his body, giving him a shocked appearance.

Some characters like the Third Exorcist were created as a setup and connected to both Kanda and Alma Karma's backstories. For their story arc, Lavi was supposed to appear but Hoshino found this challenging because it featured multiple characters. As a result, by the end of this story arc Allen abandons the Order so that Hoshino was able to write fewer characters per chapter. Hoshino has gone on to say that she often creates so many new characters across the series, the plot starts to change as it is driven by them. Originally, the setting and plot begin with a more coherent tone, but Hoshino must change them to match the characters' actions and believes it is more exciting to the point they might affect the conclusion. In designing the characters, Hoshino found it challenging as some of them, like Allen and Howard Link, started sharing similarities. To gather research for them, Hoshino uses the fashion magazine Sou-en and also asks for her assistant's help.

=== Casting ===
During production of the first anime adaptation the author often visited the TMS Entertainment studio, where the voice actors asked for her advice about their characters. While nervous about giving advice, Hoshino was amazed by the work of most of the voice actors. Tyki Mikk's voice actor, Toshiyuki Morikawa, remembered the series' recording sessions as being "lively" because of the presence of many popular actors. After the anime wrapped, the actors (who became friends during production) kept in touch. Sanae Kobayashi aimed to portray Allen properly as she feared, her performance might make the character act like a child. She states that despite his peaceful demeanor, Allen often shows angry mannerism when fighting, which allowed her to relate with the character. Once the series started airing, Kobayashi commented that Allen will mature across the narrative thanks to his interactions with other characters from the series. Hoshino was impressed by the delivery of his lines Kanda had when first seeing him while working in the making of the series.^{[vol. 9:187]} Meanwhile, Shizuka Itō found Lenalee striking both in terms of personality and design and thus wanted to properly voice the character when receiving the news she was being cast. Hoshino joked that Lenalee seemed more beautiful after she saw Itō's work.^{[vol. 9:187]}

For the sequel D.Gray-man Hallow, the cast was replaced. Hoshino was surprised by the acting of Japanese actors Ayumu Murase (Allen) and Yutaka Aoyama (Millennium Earl) because they managed to bring out different sides of the characters not seen previously. Murase said he had positive thoughts about his work, hoping it would appeal to the audience. During recordings of Hallow, Hoshino was surprised by Murase's work, finding him suitable for Allen. Murase's switching between two personalities—Allen and the Nea D. Campbell—impressed the manga author, who thought at first Murase was using a machine to change the tone of them. Although Murase only appeared with the Millennium Earl twice in Hallow, his job left a positive impression. During a broadcast of Hallow, Hoshino made multiple illustrations of Allen interacting with the Noah clan to support the actors. Murase was moved by Hoshino's determination to develop Allen in the manga and thus felt a better impression of his character. Aoyama's work received praise by Hoshino due to the fact he has to perform both sides of the Earl: the free-spirited clown-looking like character and the mourning human self who is determined to recover his brother, Nea. Aoyama was surprised by the Hoshino's comments stating he did not understand her overwhelming reaction. Aoyama also felt that playing the Earl's human form was difficult due to how different he behaves in that appearance to the point of being one of the hardest character to voice.

== Protagonists ==
=== Allen Walker ===
Allen Walker (アレン・ウォーカー, Aren Wōkā) is a warm-hearted 15-year-old British Exorcist and the series' main protagonist.^{[vol. 1:62]} He turned his adoptive father, Mana Walker, into an Akuma (demon). During this incident, Allen's left eye was cursed by his father, granting him the ability to see the souls of Akuma, and his left arm awoke as an anti-Akuma weapon.^{[ch. 3]} Allen is revealed to be the 14th Noah, Nea, and will eventually be taken over by Nea's consciousness and become a Noah.^{[ch. 136,166]} As a result, Allen is looked at with suspicion and eventually confined.^{[ch. 202]} Allen was voiced by Sanae Kobayashi^{ep. 1} and by Ayumu Murase in D.Gray-man Hallow in Japanese. He is voiced by Todd Haberkorn in English.^{ep. 1}

=== Lenalee Lee ===
Lenalee Lee (リナリー・リー, Rinarī Rī) is a teenage Exorcist from China.^{[vol. 1:172]} Her parents were killed by an Akuma when she was very young, and she was forced to become an Exorcist as a child. Because she was separated from her brother Komui, her only remaining family member, she repeatedly tried to escape and was restrained. This led her to hate the Order and Innocence. When Komui joined the Order to be with her, she stopped trying to escape. She now fights for her brother as well as her friends, knowing she has a home and family to return to.^{[ch. 21]} Her perception of the "world" consists of her friends and family; whenever one of her friends dies, it seems to her as if a part of her world has been destroyed.^{[ch. 69]} Lenalee was voiced by Shizuka Itō and by Ai Kakuma in D.Gray-man Hallow in Japanese. She is voiced by Luci Christian in English.^{ep. 2}

=== Yu Kanda ===
Yu Kanda (神田 ユウ, Kanda Yū) is an antisocial teenage Exorcist who is always clashing with Allen Walker. He sees lotus flowers blooming wherever he goes; when there was one flower, he was told that it was an illusion, and since then the flowers have multiplied to cover everything.^{[ch. 186]} He refuses to die until he meets a certain person. Later in the series, it is revealed Kanda is a Second Exorcist, an artificial body possessing the brain of an Exorcist who died thirty years before the storyline. The Black Order launched the Synthetic Disciple Project nine years before the storyline. Kanda was voiced by Takahiro Sakurai and by Takuya Sato in D.Gray-man Hallow in Japanese. In English, he was voiced by Travis Willingham in the first two seasons of D.Gray-man and is voiced by Ian Sinclair in all subsequent appearances.^{ep. 2}

=== Lavi ===
Lavi (ラビ, Rabi) is a cheerful 18-year-old red-haired Exorcist of mixed heritage. He aims to become a Bookman, a person who records the hidden history of the world, and has been trained from a young age to achieve that goal. Lavi is the 49th alias he has assumed after casting away his real name to reach that goal.^{[ch. 192]} He works alongside the Black Order to be close to the events that must be seen, but slowly becomes more attached to his Black Order friends. His original Bookman self is constantly being clouded by his growing desire to care for them.^{[ch. 119]}^{[ch. 58]} Lavi was voiced by Kenichi Suzumura and by Natsuki Hanae in D.Gray-man Hallow in Japanese. In English, he is voiced by Jason Liebrecht from episodes 13 to 26 and from episode 40 onwards. Chris Patton assumed the role for episodes 27 to 39 while Liebrecht recovered from a car accident.

== Antagonists ==
=== The Millennium Earl ===
The Millennium Earl (千年伯爵, Sennen Hakushaku) is the First Disciple and is truly named "Adam"; he is the story's main antagonist and head of the Clan of Noah. He has existed for 7000 years. He tricks people who mourn for their dead friends or relatives into resurrecting them, turning them into Akuma that he can then control.^{[ch. 1]} The only person known to have escaped this fate was Allen Walker, who destroyed the Akuma Mana before it had a chance to take over his body. The Earl would often reminisce about why he did not kill Allen in their first meeting and cursed himself for not doing it. Since learning that Nea, the 14th disciple of the Noah, is within Allen he makes significant efforts to recruit him as a Noah. Nea tried killing the Earl several years ago. Even so, the Earl still wishes to stay close to Nea to the point of ordering Allen's kidnapping. The Earl resembles a grotesque caricature of a Victorian gentleman: a rotund figure in a cape and top hat, with a perpetual enormous grin, a pair of pince-nez spectacles, and horns hidden under the hat. This is merely the form he displays in the open, however, as his true form looks more like a human wearing a cape and hat. Despite his intentions he often displays a cheerful attitude but is quick to reveal his more intimidating and malicious side. The Millennium Earl was voiced by Junpei Takiguchi and is voiced by Yutaka Aoyama in D.Gray-man Hallow in Japanese. He is voiced by Jason Liebrecht in English.

=== Road Kamelot ===
Road Kamelot (ロード・キャメロット, Rōdo Kyamerotto) is the Ninth Disciple and is truly named Road (夢(ロード), Rōdo); she represents the "Dreams" of Noah. Despite her early teen appearance, she is referred to as the "oldest" Noah or the "First Child".^{[ch. 98]}^{[ch. 86]} She is the adopted daughter of Sheril Kamelot and his wife, and she is a niece of Tyki Mikk. Road often acts like a normal teenager, but has shown signs of sadism. Road stated that she hates humans early in the series, but she becomes attached to Allen Walker, to the point where she kisses him upon meeting him. She is gifted with the ability to travel between dimensions without using the Noah's Ark and has shown some use of complete regeneration, telekinesis, and telepathy.^{[ch. 23]}^{[ch. 91]} Road is also the only Noah capable of programming the Noah's Ark because she is the "oldest".

While originally written as a tomboy, Hoshino made the character more feminine and mature as the series progresses. Due to her enigmatic connections with the Noah Nea, Hoshino said that Road is one of the most important characters within her clan. She also gave her a gothic lolita look and showed more of her chest to make her more appealing. Road was voiced by Ai Shimizu and is voiced by Yui Kondo in D.Gray-man Hallow in Japanese. She is voiced by Cherami Leigh in English.

=== Tyki Mikk ===
Tyki Mikk (ティキ・ミック, Tiki Mikku) is the Third Disciple and is truly named Joyd (快楽(ジョイド), Joido); he represents the "Pleasure" of Noah.^{[ch. 98]} He is the younger brother of Sheril Kamelot and Road Kamelot's uncle.^{[ch. 158]} The Earl once mentions that Tyki subconsciously suppresses his Noah. Tyki has two "sides" to his life. In one he is a carefree Portuguese vagabond human, and in the other he is a Noah and seemingly well known in society.^{[ch. 157]}^{[ch. 42]} He enjoys living them both, but fears losing his human friends. After Allen Walker's failed attempt to exorcise the Noah, the Noah inside him truly awakens and consumes him.^{[ch. 130]} The holy marks, which had previously disappeared, are replaced by three marks: a large one at the base of his neck and two smaller ones on his hands. His appearance transforms into that of a demonic knight and later, after his human form returns, a gray skin tone remains.^{[ch. 157]} Tyki has the ability to freely "choose" what he wants to touch, allowing him to walk on water or air and harmlessly pass through anything (with the exception of Innocence) at will.^{[ch. 55]}^{[ch. 45]}^{[ch. 112]} He can also "reject" the atmosphere, creating a vacuum. Teez, man-eating golems (in the shape of butterflies), given as a gift from the Earl,^{[ch. 55]} can be forced inside any body, which can corrode them.

He seems to have an appearance like that of the 14th Noah, Nea. As a result, among other things, Hoshino made Tyki different by having his hair longer. The author has said Tyki has sex appeal. Unlike other characters such as Yu Kanda, he is easier to illustrate. Tyki was voiced by Toshiyuki Morikawa and is voiced by Masakazu Nishida in D.Gray-man Hallow in Japanese. He is voiced by Brad Hawkins in English.

=== Nea D. Campbell ===
Nea D. Campbell (ネア・D・キャンベル, Nea D Kyanberu), often referred to as "The 14th" (14番目, Jūyonbanme), was the extra member of the Noah Family and the younger brother of Mana Walker.^{[ch. 166]} He was the only member, other than the Ninth Disciple Road and the Earl, who was able to control the Noah's Ark. Before the story's timeline, he gave this power away to a human and ran, betraying the Earl and the Clan of Noah. He attempted to kill the Earl to become the new Earl himself but was killed in return by the Earl.^{[ch. 86]}^{[ch. 167]} Later, it was revealed that the 14th had chosen Allen Walker as his next host. Some time before his death, he told Cross Marian that if Mana was looked after, he would return to him one day.^{[ch. 166]} He appears briefly in Allen's mind to name himself "Nea, the one who will destroy everything". Soon after, Nea fully possesses Allen for brief moments and wonders about the current situation, confused by the fact that Allen does not remember him as an ally whereas his other ally, Cross Marian, is missing in action.^{[ch. 220]} Although Nea considers Mana his enemy, he tells Black Order member Howard Link that he will destroy humanity. In Japanese, he is voiced by Ayumu Murase both while possessing Allen and when interacting with him.

=== Apocryphos ===
The Apocryphos (隠されし者(アポクリフォス), Apokurifosu; lit. "The Hidden One") is an autonomous, sentient Innocence that possesses a humanoid form, and third party to the war between the Black Order and the Noah. It is the guardian of the Heart, the central Innocence whose existence maintains the others, and seems to know what the Heart is "feeling".^{[ch. 202,203]} It also refers to itself as the "Grim Reaper of the Noah" because its body and powers are the polar opposite of those of the Noah. Because it is the Heart's guardian, the Noah have been searching for the Apocryphos for seven-thousand years because it is known to stay close to the Heart, the Noah's target.^{[ch. 204]} The Apocryphos can appear as a normal human being and is disguised as an unnamed cardinal of the Church visiting the Black Order. It can assimilate other Innocence and use the Innocence to locate Exorcists;^{[ch. 205]} It also seems to possess telepathic abilities and can render people unconscious and erase their memories. Many of its abilities have a feather-life motif.^{[ch. 203]} It is also very quick and powerful and can easily outmaneuver Crow member Howard Link and Noah Tyki Mikk.^{[ch. 203,204]} The Apocryphos seems to have murdered Cross Marian with the General's own anti-Akuma weapon and later attempts to assimilate Allen Walker.^{[ch. 208]} However, Allen escapes, and the Apocryphos chases him for three months. Hoshino wrote him after having a discussion with her editor, in order to have a set up for the Innocence known as "Heart", a plot point previously mentioned.

== Other characters ==
=== Black Order ===
The Black Order (黒の教団, Kuro no Kyōdan), an "army" of the Vatican and the Pope, extends into every continent, having a branch headquarters in each with the main headquarters located in Europe.^{[ch. 1363]} Although every part of the organization is needed to defeat The Millennium Earl, the entire Order is divided into active units and support units. The active units consist of the generals and Exorcists, while the support units are divided into several smaller departments: Science, Intelligence, Medical, Signal, Security, Diplomatic, and Logistics. Every department is individually managed by a section chief, and each branch by a branch chief, but the entire organization is directed by a chief officer, who is currently Komui Lee. Because of an attack launched by the Noah Lulu Bell on the building, the headquarters moved from the castle, where it had been located for a century, to London.^{[ch. 169]} After this move, the Science department was split into three sections.^{[ch. 170]} The grand generals, who are ranked higher than the chief, are rumored to have links to the Vatican, which funds the organization. Often, the Vatican sends agents to observe the Order.^{[ch. 137]} The Black Order also uses "Crows" (鴉 (Karasu)), an elite squad under the command of the Central Office, highly trained in combat and refined magic.^{[ch. 168]}

==== Vatican ====
===== Malcolm C. Rouvelier =====
Having gained power quickly and decisively within the immediacy of the Order's founding, the Rouvelier family includes many members with great clout and reputation within the Black Order; Malcolm C. Rouvelier (マルコム・C・ルベリエ, Marukomu C Ruberie) stands at their head.^{[ch. 150]} An influential member of the Central Office of the Black Order, he was sent by special request of the Vatican to observe and report on the actions of exorcists and their supporters in the wake of the arrival of the Ark.^{[ch. 137]} Rouvelier is a tall man with a toothbrush mustache who possesses a pervading and intimidating aura.^{[ch. 150]}^{[ch. 149]} Victory in the war against the Earl is his tantamount concern, and exorcists are little more than the tools needed to win it.^{[ch. 136]} He even forces non-compatible humans to synchronize with Innocence. He later reveals that he ostracized Allen Walker from the Order so that the 14th Noah can only be controlled by himself. He wishes to use the 14th Noah so that humans — not the Order nor the Noah — win the war. When asking Zu to restore the nearly dead Link, Hoshino gathered data on various poses before illustrating him. Hoshino found Rouvelier easier to illustrate than the series' protagonists. Malcolm was voiced by Ryūsuke Ōbayashi and is voiced by Tōru Ōkawa in D.Gray-man Hallow in Japanese. He is voiced by Sean Hennigan in English.

===== Howard Link =====
Howard Link (ハワード・リンク, Hawādo Rinku), under the command of Malcolm C. Rouvelier, is an inspector of the Order's Central Office sent to observe and report on the behavior of Allen Walker. He is a member of Crow (鴉 (Karasu)), an elite squad under the command of the Central Office. Armed with a pair of unfolding blades hidden in his coat sleeves, Link is a highly agile fighter possessing great strength and dexterity, practiced in the use of mystical seals that bind targets, generate vortexes and other techniques. It is said that Link dies after the incident with the Apocryphos, but it is revealed that he is still alive thanks to Zu. However, he is unable to remember the incident. He is working as Rouvelier's personal Crow and is tasked with winning the 14th Noah's trust so that Rouvelier can use the 14th to help the humans — not the Order nor the Noah — win the war. Though polite, he is devoted to his work and to Rouvelier, emulating the latter's fondness for sweets nearly to a fault.

Link's design changes some time following his introduction to reflect that a time-skip has passed in the series. This made him more good-looking according to Hoshino. Originally single-minded and obedient to Rouvelier, Link's character began to develop as the author believed he had a "backbone". For example, in one scene Link gives an imprisoned Allen rice gruel with a message that badmouths his own superior. Link was voiced by Daisuke Kishio in the first anime and is voiced by Shinnosuke Tachibana in D.Gray-man Hallow in Japanese. He is voiced by Aaron Roberts in English.

==== Headquarters ====
===== Komui Lee =====
Komui Lee (コムイ・リー, Komui Rī) is the current Supervisor of the Black Order and Lenalee's older brother. He is also the branch chief. Taken from him when her compatibility with Innocence was determined, Komui decided to join the Black Order and worked his way to the top to be close to Lenalee. Despite being goofy and somewhat of a slacker, he takes the weight of his position seriously and does everything in his power to protect the Exorcists from their enemies both outside and within the Order. As supervisor, he possesses great authority within the Black Order, collectively commanding the Exorcists and the various branches of the Order, subservient only to the great generals, the Vatican, and certain members of the Central Office. He is very close to, and painfully protective of, his younger sister, willing to bring great suffering to any and all who direct too much attention toward her or cause her any grief. Komui was voiced by Katsuyuki Konishi and is voiced by Gō Inoue in D.Gray-man Hallow in Japanese. He is voiced by J. Michael Tatum in English.

===== Reever Wenham =====
Reever Wenham (リーバー・ウェンハム, Rībā Wenhamu) from Australia, is the section chief of the Black Order Headquarters' Science department.^{[ch. 5]} He is a rather comical character but is protective of his coworkers and comrades. Although he often complains about Komui's behavior, Reever still admires him. He specializes in mathematics, chemistry and language. Reever was voiced by Ryōtarō Okiayu and is voiced by Tomokazu Sugita in D.Gray-man Hallow in Japanese. He is voiced by Chuck Huber in English.

===== Bak Chan =====
Bak Chan (バク・チャン, Baku Chan) is a 29-year-old Chinese descendant of a German wizard who was one of the founders of the Black Order. He is also the leader of the Black Order's Asia Branch, a post previously occupied by his great-grandfather.^{[ch. 60]} Like Komui, he is a man completely aware of his duties and will follow God's will strictly. He can use spells that control the structure of the building because of his great-grandfather's seal and his bloodline. Acting as the director of the branch, he is a cold and very responsible leader; however, he is very caring toward others. He has a stalker-like infatuation with Lenalee, as seen by a folder of photos of her he carries everywhere with him. He also has a close relationship with Fo. Nine years ago, the Chan and Epstein families were forced to participate in the Synthetic Disciple Project, which created Exorcists referred to as Second Exorcists. He is the son of Edgar, the former assistant head of Asia Branch, and Twi Chan, the former head of Asia Branch. Due to various unfortunate circumstances, Edgar and Twi are later killed by Alma during his rampage. Bak was voiced by Shin-ichiro Miki and is voiced by Wataru Hatano in D.Gray-man Hallow in Japanese.

===== Fo =====
Fo (フォー, Fō) is the guardian deity of the Black Order's Asia Branch, sealed by Bak's great-grandfather.^{[ch. 60]}^{[ch. 61]} The branch is protected by a barrier created by Fo, the "entrance". Although she is not a human, she often takes on a humanoid form. She shares a strong bond with Bak but loves to tease him. She can manipulate her form to change her hands into blade-like weapons or to copy someone's appearance.^{[ch. 62]}^{[ch. 81]} She is also capable of communicating telepathically with others. Although she shows a "tough-love" attitude toward others, she is a very caring individual.^{[ch. 80]} She helped train Allen to try to get his Innocence to activate. Nine years ago, she was seen carrying Edgar's body to Twi's after the rampage and was reflecting on Twi's instructions not to protect everyone, as that was what the Research Facility Team wanted. Fo was voiced by Miina Tominaga and is voiced by Natsumi Takamori in D.Gray-man Hallow in Japanese. She is voiced by Felecia Angelle in English.

==== Exorcists ====
Exorcists (エクソシスト, Ekusoshisuto), also known as "Accommodators", are chosen by each piece of the divine substance Innocence (イノセンス, Inosensu). This allows them to control it in its weaponized form, the anti-Akuma weapon. Their job includes defeating the Akuma and searching the world for the scattered Innocence. They receive daily orders from the chief, although they are normally placed under one of the general's command. With Allen joining the Order, there were 19 Exorcists. Since then, seven have died and four have joined, creating a total of 16 living Exorcists. The Innocence grants each Exorcist a unique, supernatural ability. They are usually categorized into two types of Exorcists depending on the form their anti-Akuma weapon takes and how they are invoked. An Equipment-type Exorcist controls an Innocence that is "restrained" by a weapon form. Parasite-type Exorcists are a rare type of Exorcist who control the Innocence in an unaltered form with their bodies. When invoked, their weapon usually appears as a human body part, but is composed of a different cellular structure. Parasite-type Exorcists can manipulate their weapon through emotion. Because the Innocence is not physically in contact with its Equipment-type Accommodator, the Exorcist cannot control the weapon as well as a Parasite-type can. However, an Equipment-type Accommodator will live much longer than a Parasite-type as the Innocence's power shortens their lifespan through inhabiting the same body. There is a new, third type of Exorcist: The Crystal-type. Lenalee Lee and Yu Kanda are the only known members of this group. In this type, the Innocence takes on a metallic form created from the Exorcist's blood. Although the Innocence can be controlled through emotions like a Parasite-type, no part of the user's body is altered; instead, the Innocence resides in the crystals making up the metallic substance.

In addition to those Exorcists chosen by Innocence, there are Exorcists referred to as Second Exorcists and Third Exorcists. The Second Exorcists were created nine years ago as part of the Synthetic Disciple Project, forced upon the Chan and Epstein families by Central; they are created by transplanting the brains of deceased Exorcists into new, artificial bodies, in hopes of re-synchronizing the Innocence. Yu Kanda and Alma Karma are the only successful subjects in this group.^{[ch. 186]} Using a piece of the original Akuma Egg, members of the Black Order also created the Third Exorcists. The Third Exorcists are fused with dark matter and Alma's cells to become partially Akuma themselves; they gain mutated arms that can absorb and destroy Akuma.^{[ch. 185]}

The Exorcists are assisted by Finders who are volunteers working for Black Order, but do not possess Innocence. They wear distinctive long, cream-colored uniforms and travel the world determining possible locations of shards of Innocence.

===== Hevlaska =====
Hevlaska (ヘブラスカ, Heburasuka) is the Accommodator for the Innocence Cube and has been so before the Black Order's establishment over one hundred years ago. She is completely enveloped by her Innocence, which seems to be indefinitely invoked. She is able to "probe" inside an Exorcist's body with tentacles to touch an Innocence and determine its synchronization rate and hidden potential.^{[ch. 6]} She can use this to determine if an Innocence still has an Accommodator.^{[ch. 171]} Any Innocence recovered from missions is kept in her body, which has 109 holes, one for each Innocence, until an Accommodator is found.^{[ch. 18]} Hevlaska's prophesies are said usually to be correct.^{[ch. 6]} Hevlaska is voiced by Yūko Kaida in Japanese. She is voiced by Wendy Powell in English.

===== Miranda Lotto =====
Miranda Lotto (ミランダ・ロットー, Miranda Rottō) is a 25-year-old German woman whose clock caused time to rewind in her town after she unknowingly activated the Innocence inside it. She often feels inferior and useless and has been fired from over a hundred jobs.^{[ch. 21]}^{[ch. 24]} This contributes to her chronic depression. With the help of Allen and Lenalee, she became determined to be a useful Exorcist, and has become more self-confident and capable; she is still, however, a very nervous and jittery person. Her Equipment-type anti-Akuma weapon, the Time Record (刻盤, Taimu Rekōdo), is located on her right arm. It allows her to stop or reverse time in an area for a short while, causing any object to revert to its original status; however, any damage the object suffered before and during the reversed time will affect the object once the technique is stopped. She is also unable to resurrect the dead, because her Innocence cannot erase time.

Hoshino found Miranda to be a relatable character when writing her due to her pleasure in helping others. She believes this made her popular, at least with the female readers. While initially having black circles under her eyes, Hoshino decided to remove them as Miranda becomes an exorcist and lives a healthier lifestyle. Miranda was voiced by Megumi Toyoguchi and is voiced by Ami Koshimizu in D.Gray-man Hallow in Japanese. She is voiced by Colleen Clinkenbeard in English.

===== Arystar Krory III =====
Arystar Krory III (アレイスター・クロウリー三世, Areisutā Kurōrī Sansei) is a 28-year-old Romanian man who was mistakenly identified as a vampire by nearby villagers because his Innocence caused him to instinctively attack people (who were actually Akuma). His name is based on the similar-sounding name of English occultist Aleister Crowley. He lived in seclusion with a woman he loved named Eliade. He later discovered that she was an Akuma, and after a vicious battle that resulted in him killing her, he fell into a deep despair. Krory tries to kill himself by irritating his grandfather's carnivorous flowers and trying to get them to eat him. Allen then tells him to become an Exorcist so Eliade would not have died needlessly. He later decides to become an Exorcist, though he continuously thinks of Eliade and mourns her death.

Krory has a Parasite-type Innocence that activates with the help of Akuma blood, giving him temporary superhuman strength. His anti-Akuma weapon allows him to break down the poison in the Akuma's blood and control his own blood, and the blood of others to an extent. This grants him increased strength, speed, and regenerative abilities, as well as the ability to create a mannequin of blood, and harden blood on his fingers until they become claw-like, as seen in the battle against Jasdevi in the Noah's Ark.^{[ch. 108]} He often uses them in a vampire-like fashion, sucking the blood from the Akuma. In the same fashion, he can extract the Akuma's blood virus from those infected with it. He is immune to the poison to an extent, but if he has no strength, it is hard for his Innocence to break down the poison.

Krory's personality changes dramatically when his Innocence is activated; normally he is very meek and naïve, but when activated, he gains a cocky and brash attitude. Hoshino likes this change of personality as it made the character easier to write. Originally, he was supposed to act more like a real vampire by demanding more Akuma blood, but this idea was discarded. When drawing him, Hoshino pays more attention to his forelock, finding it easy to draw. Krory was voiced by Mitsuo Iwata and is voiced by Noriaki Sugiyama in D.Gray-man Hallow in Japanese. He is voiced by Eric Vale in English.

===== Bookman =====
Bookman (ブックマン, Bukkuman) is an 88-year-old man who records the hidden history of the world along with his apprentice, Lavi. He comes from the Bookman clan and discards his own name, simply introducing himself as "Bookman". He refers to Allen as "The Destroyer of Time" according to Hevlaska's prophecy. He believes Allen is the only one who can defeat The Millennium Earl. Bookman also believes a "Bookman" does not put himself on the front line. He allies himself with the Black Order merely to be close to events that must be witnessed and recorded.

Bookman's anti-Akuma weapon, a myriad of acupuncture needles with which he can attack and traverse the battlefield, is called Heavenly Compass (天針, Hebun Konpasu). He is also skilled in Chinese acupuncture healing techniques. Bookman was voiced by Takeshi Aono and is voiced by Hōchū Ōtsuka in D.Gray-man Hallow in Japanese. He is voiced by R. Bruce Elliott in English.

===== Noise Marie =====
Noise Marie (ノイズ・マリ, Noizu Mari) is a 28-year old blind Exorcist trained under General Tiedoll. He is very close to Yu Kanda usually calming him down, saying that Kanda had "saved" him. This is later revealed in the flashback to Kanda's memories with Alma Karma. Using his regenerative blood, Kanda had accidentally healed Marie's head wound, and dragged him out through an air vent to avoid being experimented on.^{[ch. 193]} Marie sees how Allen and Kanda are similar and that they are "so deep in darkness" that he has no idea how to pull them out of it.^{[ch. 135]}^{[ch. 87]} Having been close to death multiple times, Hoshino designed his younger adult form as a pessimistic person during Kanda's backstory. Nevertheless, she wanted him to look trustworthy.

His Equipment-type anti-Akuma weapon, Noel Organon (聖人ノ詩篇, Noeru Oruganon), grants him incredible hearing abilities; because of this, he wears headphones that filter excess sound. The weapon also allows for offense by forming strings from both of his hands and can be used to capture a victim or even slice them in half. The strings also allowed him to conduct music that paralyzes Akuma and destroys them from inside their body. Marie was voiced by Kiyoyuki Yanada and is voiced by Yasuhiro Mamiya in D.Gray-man Hallow in Japanese. He is voiced by Ray Gestaut in English.

===== Chaoji Han =====
Chaoji Han (チャオジー・ハン, Chaojī Han) is a 20-year-old crew-member of a ship helping the Exorcists travel to Japan. He is one of the surviving shipmates after the ship is lost at sea after an Akuma attack.^{[ch. 77]} He is later discovered to be an Accommodator, and he happily becomes an Exorcist under General Tiedoll to avenge those he lost at the hands of the Earl.^{[ch. 135]} He was raised by Anita, a supporter of the Black Order. After his mother was killed by an Akuma he becomes extremely loyal to Anita and the crew of her ship. He develops an extreme hatred of all Noah and Akuma even after their deaths, going so far as to accuse Allen of being evil for sparing the life of Tyki Mikk.^{[ch. 123,126]} After Allen leaves the Order, he cannot understand why the other Exorcists have trouble accepting Allen's departure and says that he will fight Allen himself.^{[ch. 207]}

His Equipment-type anti-Akuma weapon is called the Arm of Baptism (洗礼ノ腕輪, Āmu Obu Baputesuma) that grants him superhuman strength.^{[ch. 126,134]} It appears as a pair of gloves with buttons on each knuckle and cloth-like extensions at the wrists.^{[ch. 207]} When dormant, it takes the form of two linked bracelets on his left wrist.^{[ch. 134]} Chaoji was voiced by Mamoru Miyano^{ep. 51} and is voiced by Hiroshi Okamoto in D.Gray-man Hallow in Japanese. He is voiced by Ian Sinclair in English.

===== Timothy Hearst =====
Timothy Hearst (ティモシー・ハースト, Timoshī Hāsuto) is a nine-year-old orphan who is able to take over the bodies of other people due to a ball found in his forehead.^{[ch. 174]} This ball appeared after his father, a jewel thief, made him swallow a stolen jewel. He uses his ability to steal treasures from the people and museums of Paris under the moniker "Phantom Thief G" in an attempt to help fund the orphanage where he lives.^{[ch. 172]}^{[ch. 175]}

After a stressful encounter involving a close friend and an Akuma, his Innocence awakens and discovers that he has the power of Divine Possession (憑神, Tsukikami). Using this power, he can take possession of an Akuma, and transform into another form after the possession has taken place. While he is possessing the Akuma, he has access to all its abilities. The spirit of the Innocence, a sentient entity that resides within the jewel of his Innocence, also appears. The spirit devours the spirit of the possessed Akuma, who has been pushed out of the body. The Innocence's spirit, or "second", takes a form from Timothy's mind and has chosen Timothy's image of his future self. Only Timothy can see the spirit, and the spirit can possess Timothy's body while he is not using it.^{[ch. 179]} Once he leaves the body of the Akuma, the Innocence purifies the body and the body disappears. After an Akuma attack on the orphanage, he joins the Black Order to protect the children and his teacher from the Akuma. Before he joins, Timothy asks the Black Order to pay for the damage that he caused as Phantom Thief G. After joining the Black Order, he becomes Klaud Nine's apprentice. Timothy is voiced by Sayuri Yahagi in D.Gray-man Hallow in Japanese. He is voiced by Brittney Karbowski in English.

===== Daisya Barry =====
Daisya Barry (デイシャ・バリー, Deisha Barī) was a 19-year-old boy from Bodrum, a seaside town and port in Turkey. A fan of soccer, his affection and skill for the sport shone through in his fighting style. As a child, he was the oldest brother of several siblings. Since his parents were merchants, he was often tasked either with helping in the shop or watching his brothers and sisters. Despite his love for his family, he craved something more adventurous. This was his main reason for deciding to be an Exorcist. Daisya was a student of General Froi Tiedoll who found him in his hometown. Daisya was rebellious and rude as a child and fervently denied all interest in being an Exorcist. After his town was attacked by Akuma, and he saw how cool General Tiedoll looked, he decided he would like to try and left home. Before he left, he used his soccer ball to kick down the doorbell his family used at their shop, saying it was the only thing in that house he was fond of besides his deadbeat father, nagging mother, two annoying brothers, and his crybaby sister. Daisya, Kanda, and Marie were sent to Barcelona, Spain, where General Tiedoll said he would be. After fighting some Akuma in the city, Daisya ran into Tyki Mikk and provoked him when he felt suspicious of his identity as a mere human. Soon after, Tyki destroys Daisya's Innocence and uses Teez to kill him. His body is later seen hung upside down from a lamp post by chains, his arms held out by his sides, so that his body is positioned like an upside-down cross. Upon hearing of his death, General Tiedoll weeps openly and burns a sketch of Daisya's hometown as a tribute. Tiedoll claims Daisya had a good heart, even though he did use his Charity Bell to break his glasses. Daisya's trademark was two teardrop-shaped lines that end at sharp points made with purple makeup below his eyes.

The Charity Bell (隣人ノ鐘, Chariti Beru), his Equipment-type anti-Akuma weapon, hangs at the tip of his hat. When activated, it takes the form of a hollow ball which he can kick around. When the ball goes inside an Akuma's body, it makes a ringing bell-like sound, which destroys the Akuma. Daisya is voiced by Hiroshi Yanaka in Japanese. He is voiced by Justin Cook in English.

===== Suman Dark =====
Suman Dark (スーマン・ダーク, Sūman Dāku), from Germany, originally joined the Black Order five years before the storyline to pay for his daughter's medical fees. After being sent on a mission to find General Winters Sokaro, his teammates Chaker Rabon and Kazanna Reed are killed by Tyki Mikk. Their deaths frighten Suman, who does not want to die; he therefore gives away the locations of his comrades in exchange for his life. Suman is judged by his Innocence for this and becomes a Fallen One (咎落ち, Togaochi), causing the Innocence to constantly deteriorate his body. Allen attempts to remove the Innocence from Suman's body but succeeds too late. This results in the death of Suman's mind. However, his body is later destroyed by Teez that Tyki Mikk had implanted in his body earlier, in exchange for not killing him.

Suman had a Parasite-type anti-Akuma weapon, which took the form of a gem-like stone near his thumb. He was able to manipulate the wind. After he dies, his Innocence was brought to the Black Order. Suman is voiced by Hozumi Gōda in Japanese. He is voiced by Robert McCollum in English.

==== Generals ====
Generals (元帥, Gensui) are immensely powerful Exorcists whose synchronization rate with their Innocence has exceeded 100%. They do not take orders from the chief, instead taking orders from the grand generals, who are ranked higher than they are. In the beginning of the series, there were five generals: Cross Marian, Kevin Yeegar, Froi Tiedoll, Klaud Nine, and Winters Sokaro. Every Exorcist is placed under the command of a general. It is a general's job to find and recruit new Exorcists; because of this, each general carries several pieces of Innocence, and they often travel for long periods of time. When the Earl begins his search for the Great Heart of the Innocence, he attacks the generals, thinking they are the best candidates to hold the Heart. This leads to the death of the oldest and most experienced general, Kevin Yeegar. After his death, teams of Exorcists are sent to protect the generals and bring them back to Headquarters. Klaud Nine and Winters Sokaro returned, but Cross Marian and Froi Tiedoll continue their missions with the aid of their Exorcist teams. During a mission to bring Cross to Headquarters, Allen exceeds the 100% synchronization rate with his Innocence; although the generals are aware of this, Allen does not become a general. Eventually, Tiedoll and Cross return to Headquarters. After Cross Marian is seemingly killed by the Apocryphos, he is no longer the accommodator for his Innocence, and subsequently, a general has disappeared.

===== Cross Marian =====
Cross Marian (クロス・マリアン, Kurosu Marian) is a general from the Black Order. Four years before the storyline and after receiving his orders, he ceased communication with the Black Order until recently when he is shown to have infiltrated the Noah's Ark. Cross is a demanding individual who is hard to please. He is a heavy drinker and has been described as a gambler and a womanizer by most. He is often in debt which he would have Allen and the Noah Jasdevi pay for him. Cross wears a mask on this face which can be used to disguise himself. Cross has the unique ability to convert Akuma and make them work under his orders.^{[ch. 75]} He is the only general whose actions have caused the Earl concern. Before his suspected death, the 14th Noah told Cross to look after Mana Walker, as the 14th will return to him one day. However, his return was short-lived, as he disappeared from his room in the Black Order's new Headquarters, where there were signs of an attack; his Innocence was left behind, and that is the last anyone has seen of him. In recent chapters, it is suggested that the sentient Innocence, Apocryphos, was involved in Cross's disappearance.

===== Froi Tiedoll =====
Froi Tiedoll (フロイ・ティエドール, Furoi Tiedōru) is a former artist who is loyal to his work and fatherly towards his disciples. He is the general in charge of Kanda, Marie, Chaoji, and Daisya. He is often seen sketching and drawing nature. He was devastated when his apprentice, Daisya, died.

The Maker of Eden (メーカー・オブ・エデン, Mēkā Obu Eden), his Equipment-type anti-Akuma weapon, takes the form of a crucifix and a rod, and a spiritual chisel. The crucifix drives the chisel into the ground, creating doll-like creatures. Another ability of his Innocence is to create an orb-like light around Tiedoll that destroys any Akuma it touches. He can also create a large forest of thorns to defend people, known as the Embracing Garden. Tiedoll was voiced by Takaya Hashi in Japanese. He is voiced by Jerry Russell in English through episode 51.

===== Klaud Nine =====
Klaud Nine (クラウド・ナイン, Kuraudo Nain) is the only female general. Formerly an animal trainer in a circus, she seems to be a kind and gentle woman, as she is seen weeping for Sol Galen, Tina Spark, and Gwen Frere who were killed searching for her. She has long blond hair, and a scar on the right side of her face. She is later the general in charge of Timothy Hearst.

Lau Shimin (ラウ・シーミン, Rau Shīmin) is Klaud's Parasite-type anti-Akuma weapon that takes the form of a little monkey, usually seen riding on her shoulder. It is the first sentient Innocence shown in the series. When invoked, it transforms into a monster that attacks with balls of energy that form at its fists. It is also able to attack in long distances. Klaud was voiced by Masako Katsuki in Japanese.

===== Winters Sokaro =====
Winters Sokaro (ウィンターズ・ソカロ, Wintāzu Sokaro) is shown to be a harsh, hard-hearted violent man who wears a hard leather (almost metal-like) mask over his head. He is a former Death Row inmate. Unlike most of the other generals, he seems to have little regard for his Exorcist team even when they die. When he removes his mask, his face is as scary as a devil.

His Equipment-type anti-Akuma weapon, Madness (神狂い, Madonesu), appears as two spiked half-rings attached to his shoulders. When invoked, he creates a complete circle out of them, causing two enormous blades to materialize on either side of the ring. Sokaro uses Madness as a powerful close-combat weapon, usually spinning the blades at high speed, creating a massive buzz saw. He can spin the blades at a very high speed, super-heating them, and throw them at his enemies to melt and slice them. Sokaro was voiced by Norio Wakamoto in Japanese.

===== Kevin Yeegar =====
Kevin Yeegar (ケビン・イェーガー, Kebin Yēgā) is the oldest of the generals. Being a former school teacher, he felt compassion for those who followed him. However, it also brings him painful memories of his life as a teacher. He is Road Kamelot's teacher but is unaware she is a Noah. In one incident, one of his students was killed in an accident. This leads another student to grieve for her, which turns her into an Akuma. Since he was not an Exorcist then, he could not kill the Akuma. This led to the massacre of all his students. He becomes an Exorcist in the wake of this incident. Later, he was attacked then crucified facing the cross by Tyki Mikk, dying shortly after the Black Order recovered his body. Yeegar's Equipment-type anti-Akuma weapon is a pair of chained pendulums that can split into multiple smaller pendulums, allowing him to attack many Akuma at once. His Innocence was eventually destroyed by The Millennium Earl. Yeegar is voiced by Kiyoshi Kawakubo in Japanese, and by Bill Jenkins in English.

=== Clan of Noah ===
Clockwise from top to bottom: The Millennium Earl, Tyki Mikk and a Tease butterfly, Skin Bolic, Road Kamelot, Jasdero, David, and Lero

The Clan of Noah (ノアの一族, Noa no ichizoku) are thirteen human descendants of the thirteen original Noah, who are reincarnated from generation to generations.^{[ch. 20,96,187]} A Noah can be identified by a gray skin tone, yellow eyes, black hair (with a few exceptions) and a horizontal line of seven cross-shaped stigmata, referred to as holy marks, across their forehead. Like Akuma, they resonate closely with the Dark Matter from which Akuma are born and made, and are adversely affected by Innocence. They do, however, possess the ability to destroy Innocence.^{[ch. 114]} The Noah share an inborn drive to kill Exorcists, but otherwise possess unique will and mindsets. They each possess the characteristics of one of the thirteen original Noah, with some even retaining their memories. If their current body is destroyed, they are reincarnated into another, as all humanity is descended from the second to thirteenth Noah. A human becomes a Noah when their Noah Memory, which is unique to each Noah, awakens. A Noah's awakening is a painful process. However, most Noah do not allow their human side to be taken over by their inner Noah. Each Noah, except for The Millennium Earl, possesses a name that also doubles as the trait of the Noah they represent. The Noah are referred to as Apostles and each has a number. In numerical order, the Noah are: the Millennium Earl (Adam); Toraido (裁(トライド)), the "Judge"; Joyd; Desires; Wiseley; Fiidora (蝕(フィードラ), Fīdora), the "Corrosion"; Maashiima (恤(マーシーマ), Māshīma), the "Mercy"; Wrath; Road; Bondom (representing the Tenth and Eleventh as one); Lustul, and Maitora (能(マイトラ)), the "Ability".

==== Jasdevi ====
Jasdero (ジャスデロ, Jasudero) and David (デビット, Debitto) were originally one Noah called Jasdevi (ジャスデビ, Jasudebi).^{[ch. 103]} They are the Tenth and Eleventh Disciples, truly named Bondomu (絆(ボンドム); lit. "Bond"); they represent the "Bonds" of Noah.^{[ch. 98]} They possess the power of Materialization (実現), which is used through bullets created by the two when thinking simultaneously, and then shooting them through an identical pair of guns.^{[ch. 99]} Their Materialization skills also allow them to create numerous objects.^{[ch. 101]}^{[ch. 107]} By shooting one another, Jasdero and David can merge and become Jasdevi. They no longer rely on their guns to focus their abilities, instead using their bare hands. Jasdevi's long hair also becomes a weapon and gains new strength from the desire to create "the strongest imagined body".^{[ch. 104]} After their fight against Krory, Hoshino redesigned it to show the deep scars the exorcist left. Hoshino thought about giving them different clothes because they are twins, but ultimately gave up on the idea. Jasdero and David are voiced by Showtaro Morikubo and Mitsuki Saiga respectively in Japanese. They are voiced by Joel McDonald and Z. Charles Bolton respectively in English.

==== Skin Bolic ====
Skin Bolic (スキン・ボリック, Sukin Borikku) is the Eighth Disciple and is truly named Wrath (怒(ラースラ), Rāsura); he represents the "Wrath" of Noah, the most potent of all the Noahs' memories. He is a Noah of American descent. Three years ago, he "awoke" as a Noah.^{[ch. 96]} It is mentioned that his Noah's memory controlled him.^{[ch. 98]} He is large in stature and has a consistent gray skin tone, and his holy marks are always visible lining his forehead. After experiencing the Wrath of Noah and the suffering his ancestors felt at the hands of the Innocence, he decided never to forgive the Exorcists or God.^{[ch. 96]} He is killed by Kanda in the Noah's Ark in Edo.^{[ch. 97]} Skin's abilities are lightning-based. When using his powers, his skin peels, revealing a spiked, golden layer. Because this golem-like body has a high defense and great physical prowess, he relies on brute strength. Although Skin Bolic was killed, the Noah genes can be reincarnated into another chosen human. In chapter 201, the Earl and the Noah are planning to find the new incarnation of Wrath as they launch an all-out assault on the North American branch of the Black Order.^{[ch. 201]} Skin is voiced by Kenta Miyake in Japanese, and by Sonny Strait in English.

==== Lulu Bell ====
Lulu Bell (ルル・ベル, Ruru Beru) is the Twelfth Disciple and is truly named Lustul (色(ラストル), Rasutoru); she represents the "Lust" of Noah.^{[ch. 139,187]} Although she was originally intended to appear in the third volume, she is not introduced until much later in the series. Hoshino wanted to draw a blonde Noah, so Lulu Bell was designed to satisfy this. Her initial and final designs do not differ much. When she is in her Noah form, her hair is black, as is typical of the Noah. Lulu Bell possesses the ability of "Form", allowing her to change her body into anything she wishes, including liquids, animals, or the appearance of others.^{[ch. 138,143]} In the anime, she often appears as a cat with a pale stigmata on its forehead.^{ep. 41} She fails to take the stolen Akuma Egg back from the Order,^{[ch. 144]} and after it is broken during the attempt, she is said to be "weeping bitterly".^{[ch. 158]} She briefly reappears with the awakening of Wisely and the subsequent attacks on the Order.^{[ch. 187]} Lulu Bell was voiced by Arisa Ogasawara in Japanese.^{ep.41} She is voiced by Monica Rial in English.^{ep. 41}

==== Sheril Kamelot ====
Sheril Kamelot (シェリル・キャメロット, Sheriru Kyamerotto) is the Fourth Disciple and is truly named Desires (欲(デザイアス), Dezaiasu). He is the adoptive father of Road Kamelot, the elder brother of Tyki Mikk, and the minister of a country. He stays at his estate with his frail wife, Tricia (whom Tyki said he married only to adopt Road). He apparently has an attachment to Road and Tyki and often dotes on them both. Sheril manipulates diplomatic situations, allowing him to declare war, which will lead to the creation of more Akuma.^{[ch. 158]} Sheril is similar in appearance to Tyki. He is also tall, and has swept-back hair tied in a ponytail. His power seems to be a form of telekinesis, as he is seen crushing his target's limbs without touching them, and manipulating the movements of the Science Department team. He is also seen to manipulate objects, as he did with the pipes that bound Alma Karma. Hoshino found Sheril easy to design, aiming to give him clothes that would fit his personality. Sheril is voiced by Nobuo Tobita in D.Gray-man Hallow in Japanese.

==== Wisely Camelot ====
Wisely (ワイズリー・キャメロット, Waizurī Kyamerotto; also 智(ワイズリー)) is the Fifth Disciple; he represents the "Wisdom" of Noah. Now inhabiting the body that was originally a homeless man's, he is the most recently fully reborn Noah. Beyond a long bandanna wrapped around his forehead, his most distinguishing characteristic is a series of eye-shaped emblems decorating his forehead, the largest of which he refers to as the "Demon Eye" (魔眼, Magan). Using this, he can peer into the hearts and minds of others; any who look into it fall under his influence, and should he wish, risk having their minds blown apart. Among the Noah, he is the only one killed by the 14th in his previous incarnation to retain his old memories. Fairly laid-back, he is remarked on by his siblings as being rather haplessly imprecise. He speaks in an old-fashioned form of Japanese. Hoshino considers him her favorite Noah. She gave him white hair to stand out within the clan who had black hair. Wisely is voiced by Sōichirō Hoshi in D.Gray-man Hallow in Japanese and by Micah Solusod in English.

=== Akuma ===
Akuma (アクマ; lit. Demon) are a collection of biomechanical weapons made from a mechanized skeletal core housed within a human body. Creating the cores from a colossal "Egg", The Millennium Earl travels the world in pursuit of the right "tragedy" from which he can craft them. Manipulating the grief of the survivors of the recently deceased, he offers the former a chance to restore their beloveds, presenting the Akuma skeleton as a means of restoring the dead. The hopeful cry of the Earl's victims calls the souls of the dead back from beyond, now bound to the Earl's will. Once fully formed, the Akuma hunt and kill human prey to "evolve", massing in strength as they grow. The bodies of the initial victims become their skin, which they use to hide in plain sight amongst humans. The oil or "blood" they possess contains a powerful virus, rotting any biological matter it spreads into; they very often kill their prey with a barrage of bullets made from this "blood", causing the wounded to crumble to pieces as their body is subsumed by black, star-shaped emblems. All Akuma start off as Level Ones, a simple, spherical machine equipped with an array of cannons, and manifest greater power, intelligence and even specialized abilities as they kill more and more humans, growing more humanoid with each passing level. Though the extent of their evolution is yet undetermined, the most powerful Akuma yet seen has been a Level Four; the souls inside deteriorate further and suffer greater as the evolution progresses. Being composed of Dark Matter, made from the Earl's soul in some way, they can only be fully destroyed by the Innocence, Dark Matter's opposite. While the souls of Akuma survive and move on when destroyed by the Innocence, whenever an Akuma self-destructs or is consumed by another, the soul is consumed by Dark Matter and fades away to nothing.

=== Skulls ===
Skulls are the dehumanized servants of The Millennium Earl, and are the antagonistic counterpart of the Black Order's Science Department, specializing in black magic.^{[ch. 127]} Humanoid in form, they wear bulky robes and possess skeletal heads. Created through specialized, arcane magic, they were originally humans with exceptional minds, hand-picked by the other skulls from human prisoners. Though they are not seen to fight physically, Skulls are extremely durable, readily taking bullets to the head with little visible effect.^{[ch. 139]} Sunlight seems to vanquish them, as their bodies turn to sand when exposed to it.^{[ch. 156]} Beyond assisting the Earl in producing Akuma cores, they perform a variety of other tasks such as cleaning the Ark and sewing and designing the Earl's clothes, among other forms of manual labor.

=== Minor characters ===
==== Mana Walker ====
Mana Walker (マナ・ウォーカー, Mana Wōkā) is Allen's adoptive father, a travelling clown^{[ch. 137]} who adopted him on Christmas Day.^{[vol. 1:62]} Over time, Allen formed a very strong bond with Mana, though he had initially been annoyed with him. Eventually, Mana died at some point, putting Allen in a state of grief. It was then the boy was approached by the Millennium Earl, who offered to revive Mana for Allen, an offer which the boy accepted. When Allen turned him into an Akuma. Mana sliced through Allen's left eye, cursing him and marking it with a pentacle. He was quickly destroyed by Allen's awakened anti-Akuma weapon, but not before his original self forced its way to the surface to tell Allen that he loved him. He is allegedly the older twin brother of the 14th Noah, Nea D. Campbell. Mana also taught Allen the "notes" on the 14th's music score.^{[ch. 166]} According to Cross, Mana began to lose his grip on reality by the time Allen was adopted, undermining Allen's belief that Mana truly loved him, instead of loving the Noah that Allen possessed. His name was later revealed to be Mana D. Campbell, and he is actually one half of the Millennium Earl himself, alongside his twin brother, Nea. Mana was voiced by Fumihiko Tachiki in Japanese.^{ep. 25} In English, he is voiced by Mark Stoddard in episode two,^{ep. 2} and by Charlie Campbell from episode six onwards; Stoddard reprises the role in Hallow.

==== Eliade ====
Eliade (エリアーデ, Eriāde) was a Level 2 Akuma. She was a beautiful woman as a human and became obsessed with beauty and shopping once she evolved from her Level 1 form. Although her beauty allowed her to become a popular woman, her Akuma nature always made her feel ugly. Even so, she felt incomplete and wanted to love someone else, but as an Akuma she believed that was impossible. After some time, she met Krory and was the only person to live with him in his castle.^{[ch. 38]}^{[ch. 33]}He later killed her after learning she was an Akuma. Before her death, Eliade said she wanted to love him. She wanted to believe that Krory was a vampire and always told him so because she did not want to feel alone. She could produce bubbles that absorb all the water inside a human body.^{[ch. 39]} Eliade is voiced by Maya Okamoto in Japanese, and by Brina Palencia in English.

==== Alma Karma ====
Alma Karma (アルマ・カルマ, Aruma Karuma) is one of two Second Exorcists successfully created during the Artificial Disciple Program carried out by the Chan and Epstein families nine years before the series' beginning. He was the first of his generation of Second Exorcists to awaken and was overjoyed when Yu Kanda also awoke.^{[ch. 190]} Upon learning that as a Second Exorcist he possesses the brain of an Exorcist, a woman who was Kanda's lover in his past life, killed in battle, he kills the scientists working on the project. He also attacks Kanda, hoping to die with him and end their suffering as Second Exorcists. However, Kanda refuses and cuts Alma to pieces. Alma is later sewn back together and kept barely alive somewhere in the North American branch of the Black Order. The Central uses him to house the shard of the Akuma egg recovered by Howard Link and creates Third Exorcists from special cells produced by his body. Alma is awakened by the Noah, and his hatred for the Order and the shard of the Akuma egg transform him into an Akuma. Angry at Kanda for not dying with him, Alma attacks him again and the pair nearly succeed in destroying one another, Alma having been mortally injured in the battle. However, Allen interrupts them, discovers the truth about Alma, and reveals this to Kanda. Alma and Kanda reconcile, and Allen then helps the dying Alma and Kanda escape from the Order and the Noah. Alma dies shortly after; Kanda refuses to reveal the location of his body to the Order. Hoshino created Alma's design to contrast with Kanda's to hide his true identity based on his non-feminine look. Additionally, his Akuma form was made to stand out from other Akumas that have appeared across the series. Alma is voiced by Ryōta Asari in D.Gray-man Hallow in Japanese.

==== Timcanpy ====
Timcanpy is a modified golem who is passed down to Allen from General Cross Marian. Timcanpy follows Allen (or Lenalee when Allen is not with him) around, and can often be found resting on Allen's head or shoulders. He has the ability to record the events that occur around him and then play them back, and is able to rebuild himself when he is crushed or destroyed. It is revealed later that Timcanpy also contains the piano score for the 14th, and has been owned by Nea Walker. Timcampy is destroyed the sentient Innocence and its remains are found by Yu Kanda.

==== Katerina Eve Campbell ====
Katerina Eve Campbell is a woman who took care of both Mana and Nea D. Campbell. Allen's musical ability was derived from a lullaby Katerina sang to both her children. By the time Allen abandons the Black Order, he learns of Katerina's whereabouts, a mansion. Despite being weakened by Nea's possession of his body, Allen wishes to find Katerina's mansion to learn the truth about her children.

== Cultural impact ==
=== Merchandise and popularity ===
Several types of merchandise bear the likenesses of the series' cast. Clothing and full cosplay costumes have been released. Plush dolls, key chains, and figurines are also available. Many characters are also featured on trading cards from the several D.Gray-man Trading Card Game decks. To celebrate Halloween in 2016, more types related to the characters were released. In an Animedia character popularity poll, Allen featured as the twentieth most popular anime character. He ranked twentieth in a Newtype character poll in 2007. Yousuke Kabashima's character designs for D.Gray-man Hallow earned him fifth place in the category Character Design Award in the Newtype 2016 awards. Similarly, both Allen and Timcampy won fifth place in the categories of Best Male Character and Best Mascot, respectively. A poll by Animage magazine of the top 100 anime characters of 2016 ranked Allen 46th for his role in Hallow while Kanda ranked 76th. In a popularity poll by Japanese web portal goo, Kanda was voted the eighth most popular character with a ponytail. Lenalee has also been popular with her character taking multiple high places on Japanese anime site Anime! Anime! as the female character whose fans wanted to see her in yutaka.

=== Critical reception ===
The D.Gray-man characters were praised by A.E. Sparrow of IGN in his review of the first volume. He said that, "Walker is a solid hero with a dark past". Sheena McNeil from the web zine Sequential Tart praised Allen's character design, commenting that his anti-Akuma weapon is "quite impressive", and his cursed left eye paired and with his white hair make the design "much more striking". Ross Liversidge of the UK Anime Network said Hosino had "an excellent quality of storytelling" and found the cast appealing. Kevin Leathers, also of the UK Anime Network, noted that Allen differed from the main characters often seen in the genre which made him quite likable. On the other hand, Yu Kanda earned mix reviews as he was often compared with other anti-social characters seen in other series. Nevertheless, his dynamic with Allen and his character development resulted in praise. Anime News Network's Casey Brienza commented, "Fan favorites Kamui [sic] and Kanda in particular are sketched out strongly, with their dominant traits facing forward".

The interactions between the cast were praised by Richard Osborn from IGN for how comical they are in contrast to the series' dark plot. The Exorcists in general were praised for their strong personalities by Anne Lauenroth who cited Lenalee, Krory and Timothy because they stand out while facing enemies. Nevertheless, she was disappointed Miranda's constant nervous personality remained for many episodes. Yussif Osman from Japanator highly praised the cast's personalities finding them as some of the deepest characters seen in shonen manga citing both Lavi's backstory as well as the antagonists, the Noah Family. IGN praised the Earl saying he "is a menacing villain you'll love to hate" and the supporting cast shows enough potential to hold interest into future volumes. However, they compared the series' antagonist to three of Batman's villains and said, "Batman should consider litigation, but even he'd have problems" facing the Earl". Chris Kirby from the Fandom Post noted that while some characters' motivations and objectives remained unknown, this add mystery appeal to them. Carlo Santos of Anime News Network was not as positive, believing that the story was kept from reaching its full potential because of "generic character designs". He also said that because the action scenes are thrown together without a change of pace or mood, the readers never get to know the secondary characters better.

Tom Tonhat of The Escapist praised the cast because it inspired multiple cosplaying and praised the Earl's characterization for how he tricked people into reviving others, a theme he found dark. Like Osman, Brain Henson of Mania Beyond Entertainment enjoyed how both the Earl and the Noah clan, who have been working for him, have made the storyline darker. Additionally, in later arcs Anime News Network writer Anne Lauenroth found the Earl's characterization more intriguing as he was shown in a more sensitive way after failing to find his former comrade, Nea. In early episodes, while finding Allen outstanding, Kevin Learthers said the Noah such as Road and Tyki were more interesting characters than most of the exorcists.

When it came to the voice actors, Lauenroth said she became a fan of Kanda mostly because of his Japanese actor, Takahiro Sakurai. For the anime sequel, D.Gray-man, the entire cast was given new voice actors. While Lauenroth praised Ayumu Murase for her work as Allen, and started developing another persona, Nea, filling two roles, she had a mixed reaction to Takuya Satō's work as Kanda. Nevertheless, in following episodes she praised both Satō's, Tsubasa Yonaga's (the young Kanda) as well as Megumi Han (Alma Karma) for their work in Kanda's and Alma's backstory. Thanasis Karavasilis from Manga Tokyo said that while many fans of the series were bothered by the new actors, he did not mind the change in the main cast's voices.

Funimation's English voice actors have also been well-received by critics with Animation Insider's Kimberly Morales noting most of them were equal to the Japanese cast with the exception of Travis Willingham, Kanda's voice actor. A similar opinion was voiced by Michael Marr from Capsule Computers. DVDTalk's Todd Douglass Jr. said he preferred the English version for its "immersion" in the series, but did not consider it satisfactory. On the other hand, Casey Brienza criticized the English dub saying that while the actors did not use British accents despite most of the first episodes being set in Europe. Instead most of the cast have North American accents.
