= Katsura Hoshino =

Japanese manga artist (born 1980)

Katsura Hoshino 星野 桂
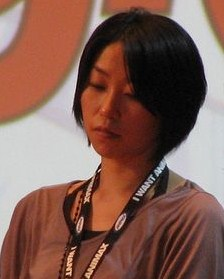
- Hoshino at the 2008 AnimagiC convention in Bonn, Germany
- Born: April 21, 1980 (age 46) Shiga Prefecture, Japan
- Areas: Manga artist and author
- Notable works: D.Gray-man

Katsura Hoshino (Japanese: 星野 桂, Hepburn: Hoshino Katsura; born April 21, 1980) is a Japanese manga artist from Shiga Prefecture. She made her debut in July 2003 with the publication of her first manga series Continue and is known for her work, D.Gray-man, which began serialization in Shueisha's Weekly Shōnen Jump in May 2004. She most recently designed characters for the 2013 Sunrise anime, Valvrave the Liberator, making it her first original work on an anime.

The D.Gray-man manga series has been adapted into various forms, including an anime series and three light novel adaptations. Three volumes placed in the top fifty of Japan's bestselling manga of 2008 and the series is one of Weekly Shōnen Jump's bestselling manga series. It has gained attention in North America; both the manga and anime adaptions are licensed for English language releases. The manga series has been well received in France; it was awarded the prize for Best Manga Series 2006 at the Anime and Manga 2007 French Grand Prix organized by Animeland. It also won Webotaku's prize for Manga of the Year 2006.

Hoshino has been highly praised for her art, which has been compared to the works of Joe Madureira, Kelley Jones, and Chris Bachalo by one reviewer and described as "some of the best artwork in the business" by another. Her character designs received many positive comments ranging from "especially lovely" to "the most visually striking element" of her art and it is said that both male and female readers will enjoy the designs.

== Early life ==
Hoshino was born on April 21, 1980, in Shiga Prefecture, Japan, as the younger of fraternal twin girls and the second of three children. As a child, she originally dreamed of becoming an astronaut. Hoshino confessed she was not too interested in school, often making excuses to avoid taking classes. Additionally, she added that would often practice drawing in the middle of the classes which gave her doubts when she had to erase them. She drew her first manga at twenty-one. As a child she used to read the manga Dragon Quest: Dai no Daibōken that her brother collected, as well as series by Fuyumi Soryo and Makimura Satoru, which her mother bought. However, she instead preferred anime, most notably Studio Ghibli films. Her favorite film was Nausicaä of the Valley of the Wind (1984) to the point of watching it multiple times. When watching Castle in the Sky (1986), Hoshino decided she wanted to become an animator, inspired by director Hayao Miyazaki mostly. When going to highschool, Hoshino started drawing which she believed to be the result of reading Naoko Takeuchi's manga Sailor Moon. She often showed the 4 panel drawings known as yonkoma drawings to her sister who was in the same college. These yonkoma often involved a monkey. Additionally, Hoshino stated she was a fan of the comedy genre as she aimed to make people laugh.

When Hoshino was 17, she aimed at getting animation jobs against her parents' wishes but she failed. Next year, she tried doing it again and was accepted. Hoshino moved to Tokyo to become an animator. Despite becoming an artist, Hoshino found problems with her job. Due to financial issues, Hoshino was thinking about going back to her parents but her sister convinced to go to Kyoto. At that time, her sister motivated her to get a job but she failed most of them. At an unknown time, Hoshino was motivated by her mother to start writing manga. She still felt troubles in her new job, due to the multiple hours at work, the problems with storyboards and having to take the bullet train. Nevertheless, Hoshino succeeded in her work. She dreamed of bringing her mother to the city and was able to in 2006. After graduating from high school, Hoshino did not know what career should she follow as she was offered the work of joining video game companies. Ultimately, she decided to become a manga author despite her fears of the difficulty it takes.

== Career ==
Hoshino's first publication Zone, a one-shot title, appeared in Akamaru Jump in December 2002 and was followed by her first series Continue (コンティニュー, Kontinyū), which was published in Weekly Shōnen Jump in July 2003. Due to lack of popularity of Continue, the Shueisha staff recommended Hoshino to make a series based on Zone. As a result, the one-shot Zone was succeeded by the D.Gray-man (ディーグレイマン, Dī Gureiman) series, which began publication in Weekly Shōnen Jump in May 2004 and contains multiple themes from Zone. The series is over two hundred chapters long in Japan and is sold in over ten countries, including the United States, France, and Germany. An anime adaptation, directed by Nabeshima Osamu and produced by Dentsu, was aired from October 2006 to September 2008. Funimation licensed an English-language version, the first thirteen episodes of which were released on DVD in March 2009. Based on Hoshino's work, Kaya Kizaki has written three novels, commonly named D.Gray-man Reverse, and Konami has developed two video games and a trading card game. The fanbook D.Gray-man Official Fanbook: Gray Ark and the art book TV Animation D.Gray-man Official Visual Collection: Clown Art were released in June 2008 and September 2008 respectively. This was followed by an illustration book titled D.Gray-man Illustrations Noche in February 2010 and another character book titled "D.Gray-man Character Workbook CharaGray!" in July 2011.

The series was well received in Japan. D.Gray-man was Weekly Shōnen Jump's ninth bestselling manga in Japan in 2007 and 2008. The fifteenth volume ranked twenty-second in 2008 manga sales in Japan while the fourteenth and sixteenth volumes placed at twenty-seventh and thirtieth respectively. The manga received the prize for Best Manga Series 2006 at the Anime and Manga 2007 French Grand Prix organized by Animeland and received Webotaku's prize for Manga of the Year 2006. In 2006, the second novel was the third bestselling novel in Japan.

In Japan, D.Gray-man has been put on hiatus many times; once due to Hoshino falling seriously ill with norovirus and another because of an injury to her neck. However the series continued shortly after in both cases. In November 2008, Weekly Shōnen Jump announced that Hoshino was again putting the series on hold due to an injured wrist. Publication resumed in March 2009. The series once again went on hiatus on May 11. The series resumed in the seasonal magazine Akamaru Jump on August 17, 2009. Following the release in Akamaru Jump, D.Gray-Man resumed its serialization on November 4, 2009, in the monthly-release Japanese manga magazine, Jump Square. Additionally, Hoshino was one of the multiple manga authors that celebrated the 10th anniversary of the manga series Naruto by drawing her own rendition of the main character, Naruto Uzumaki.

In 2013, she was the original character designer for Valvrave the Liberator by Sunrise, making it her first original work on an anime as well as her first new work since D.Gray-man. Additionally, D.Gray-man resumed serialization on July 17, 2015, in Shueisha's quarterly magazine, Jump Square Crown.

== Style ==
Two early designs of Allen Walker, the protagonist of D.Gray-man

Hoshino has been highly praised for her art and character designs. Leroy Douresseaux of Coolstreak Cartoons called Hoshino a "wonderful visualist" and commented that her "highly stylish" art resembled the works of Joe Madureira, Kelley Jones, and Chris Bachalo. Douresseaux describes the backgrounds as eerie and Lovecraftian and says that Hoshino "makes practically every page a delightful surprise of gothic style and beguiling violence". However, he believes that the character designs are the "most visually striking" element and comments that the designs and the action scenes are highly imaginative, worth even just an occasional look. The reviewer Charles Tan from ComicsVillage.com feels the art deserves less praise, saying that it is done competently enough to distinguish characters while still providing flashy scenes with the common themes of a shōnen series. Ben Leary, a reviewer from Mania.com, felt even less positive toward the action scenes than Tan. Leary believes that Hoshino simply cannot or will not draw physical combat and instead chooses to rely on energy blasts, swirling wind, and impact bursts. Casey Brienza of Anime News Network agrees. She said that "the battles, even as late in the game as volume twelve, remain practically unintelligible" and that it is difficult to tell "who is doing what to whom and when." All that could be discerned from Hoshino's "cryptic layouts" is that the characters are fighting. Brienza, however, is positive toward the rest of the art, going as far as to call it "some of the best artwork in the business". She describes Hoshino's drawing style as the "aesthetic yet dynamic, superbly beautiful yet super-violent" style made famous by female manga artist who arose from dōjinshi subculture during the late-80s and early-90s, citing Clamp and Yun Kōga as prominent examples. Brienza also praises Hoshino's character designs, which she claims are "especially lovely and pitched to satisfy fans of both sexes". When asked about how the D.Gray-man could end in poetic justice, Hoshino found this difficult as she believes it should end in a fight unlike other series influence by this style.

== Influences ==
Hoshino has named Takeshi Obata and Osamu Akimoto as inspiring her work. Her most notable work D.Gray-man is greatly influenced by her previous titles. Characters are often carried over from unpublished manga Hoshino worked on early in her career. D.Gray-man and its predecessor Zone share many major concepts, such as the creation of demons known as akuma, the Exorcists' role to eliminate these demons, and the overall plot of both works. The main antagonist of Zone, known simply as the Millennium Earl, retains his appearance and name in D.Gray-man while the features of the female protagonist were changed to create the more masculine appearance of D.Gray-man's male protagonist Allen Walker. The characters Lavi and Yu Kanda were carried over from two unpublished titles. In making the demons known as "Akuma" from D.Gray-man, Hoshino was inspired by the 1973 film, The Exorcist, even though she was afraid of the movie. By the release of the series' 13th collected volume, Hoshino revealed the material she uses when working, which included a PlayStation Portable, an iPod and a glove her mother made for her.

She uses unnamed famous scientists, Aleister Crowley and Yūsuke Santamaria as models for several of her characters. Characters are also based on her editor and the Tim Campi Design silver accessory brand. Hoshino collaborated with Kata Kizaki, the author of the novel adaptations, to create the character Bak Chan. The role of Miranda Lotto changed, and was ultimately lengthened, after Hoshino realized the similarities the two shared. Hoshino comically comments that Allen's hair has become very similar to the Super Saiyan, a transformation from Dragon Ball, in which the character's hair becomes spiky. Towards the beginning of D.Gray-man's publication, Hoshino stated that Allen, Kanda, and Cross Marian are the hardest characters to draw while the Millennium Earl and Hevlaska are the easiest.

Hoshino commented that most of her ideas for the series come after falling asleep in the bath for six hours. An exception occurs in the plot for second volume of the series, which is based on a Noh play called Koi no Omoni. As she works, she enjoys listening to Final Fantasy soundtracks, Dragon Ball CDs, the bands Porno Graffitti, L'Arc-en-Ciel, and jazz music.

Hoshino feels grateful to the editors assisting her, owing her D.Gray-man's success to them. She has also thanked her mother in some volumes of the series. The story arc involving Alma Karma proved Hoshino too difficult due to the fact it featured several characters. As a result, this arc set up Allen's departure from the Black Order to feature less characters per chapter. She has also commented the series' main theme was "tragedy" but still aims to make it fun. Additionally, once she has finished D.Gray-man, Hoshino wishes to make a more lighthearted series.

In order to gather research for the series, Hoshino once visited New York as she believes the city left a deep influence in her works. She also visited graveyards since she never had resources for the series. The ground zero of the World Trade Center after the September 11 attacks also left a big impression in her based on the guides' comments. Hoshino commented she would rather go again as she did not have much time to stay in New York.

== Works ==
=== Publications ===
- Zone (2002)
- Continue (2003)
- D.Gray-man (2004–ongoing)
- D.Gray-man Reverse 1: Clergyman's Departure (D.Gray-man reverse1 旅立ちの聖職者) (2005)
- D.Gray-man Reverse 2: The 49th Name (D.Gray-man reverse2 四十九番目の名前) (2006)
- D.Gray-man Official Fanbook: Gray Ark (D.Gray-man 公式ファンブック 灰色ノ聖櫃) (2008)
- D.Gray-man Illustrations Noche (D.Gray-man イラスト集｢Noche(ノーチェ)｣) (2010)
- D.Gray-man Reverse 3: Lost Fragment of Snow (2011)
- D.Gray-man Character Workbook CharaGray! (D．Gray－manキャラクターランキングブック キャラグレ！) (2011)
- Kaiten!! (カイテン!!) (2011)
- Demon King (2013)
- D.Gray-man Official Fan Book - Gray Log (Gray's Memory) 2017.

=== Anime ===
- Valvrave the Liberator (2013) – Original character designer
