= Millennium Earl =

Fictional character from D.Gray-man

- D.Gray-man character
- The Millennium Earl as he appears in the manga
- First appearance: D.Gray-man manga chapter 1 (2004)
- Created by: Katsura Hoshino
- Voiced by: Japanese; Junpei Takiguchi; Yutaka Aoyama (Hallow); English; Jason Liebrecht
- Notable relatives: Nea D. Campbell (brother), Tyki Mikk (adopted son), Sheryl Kamelot (adopted son), Road Kamelot (adopted granddaughter), Wisely Kamelot (adopted grandson)

The Millennium Earl (Japanese: 千年伯爵, Hepburn: Sennen Hakushaku), also known as "the Creator" and "Adam", is a fictional character in the manga series D.Gray-man by Katsura Hoshino. Introduced as the series' main antagonist, the Earl's role is to help revive the dead and turn them into demons known as Akuma. With Akuma, a group known as the Noah Family plans to destroy humanity. The Earl takes an interest in the protagonist: young exorcist Allen Walker, who is connected to the Noah. When he learns that the exorcist Allen Walker is the successor of the 14th Noah, Nea D. Campbell he attempts to capture him. The character also appears in the second light novel based on the series.

Hoshino based the character on a celebrity whose identity she refused to reveal. Primarily a clown in his early appearances, she later revealed his human form which would have an unspecified impact in the series. Critical reaction to the Millennium Earl has been positive, with critics finding his revival of the dead and killing of humans appealingly ironic. His enigmatic depth in the sequel, D.Gray-man Hallow, was also praised. A variety of merchandise based on the character has been released.

== Creation and conception ==
The reveal of the Earl's human form was important to manga artist Katsura Hoshino.

The Millennium Earl was originally featured as the villain of Katsura Hoshino's one-shot comic, Zone, which featured other characters from the D.Gray-man series, most notably Lenalee Lee and the character who served as the basis of Allen Walker, Robin. He tempts Lenalee by bringing back her lost lover but is stopped by Robin.^{[vol. 8:40]} As in D.Gray-man, the Earl promised people to return their dead love ones back to life. Hoshino originally created the Earl during her youth when she aspired to write him as the main character of her own works. However, finding the character unsuitable for a manga magazine aimed at teenagers, she instead created Allen to be the protagonist. Once D.Gray-man started serialization, Hoshino commented that she based the Earl on an unidentified, well-known person. Although the individual was noted for his art, his command of several languages and his prophecies, it was unknown when the person died. He called himself the "alchemist of time", and when D.Gray-man's first volume was published it was believed that he was still alive.^{[vol. 1:112]} Towards the series' beginning, Hoshino found the character as one of easiest to one draw alongside Hevlaska.^{[vol. 3:86]} In a later interview, Hoshino found the Earl's clown-like outfit still easier to illustrate in comparison with more "beautiful" characters, such as Yu Kanda.

In designing the Earl, Hoshino gave him a colorful look to contrast the exorcists' who wore black instead. This look was meant to give the idea of a gentleman related with the tragedy he causes as Hoshino linked him to a poisonous flower. Hoshino had already designed the Earl's human form before the manga began serialization. She found his "tired" human form as the series' main antagonist appropriate for the series' readership and one of its themes: grief. He was modelled on the Jump J-books editorial department, and her tastes were reflected in him. Although many readers considered the Earl obese, Hoshino laughingly maintained that he was not; however, his plumpness was important to the future plot.

When she first drew him as a human without his clown-like costume, Hoshino tried to make the Earl look more sensitive because she did not believe that middle-aged men were popular in the series. She was surprised by his low placing in the fourth popularity poll (18th), despite her efforts to make him more appealing in the scene where he cries in his sleep after his failed attempt to recruit his former comrade, Nea, into the Noah clan. The following encounter between the Earl and Nea was carefully written to catch attention from most readers due to how carefully Hoshino has tried drawing the encounter. Hoshino has gone to state that the Earl is her favorite character in the series even more than Allen.

The Millennium Earl was voiced by Junpei Takiguchi in the series' first Japanese-language anime adaptation and by Yutaka Aoyama in the sequel, D.Gray-man Hallow. Aoyama's work received praise by Hoshino due to the fact he has to perform both sides of the Earl: the free-spirited clown-looking like character and the mourning human self who is determined to recover his brother, Nea. Aoyama was surprised by the Hoshino's comments stating he did not understand her overwhelming reaction. Aoyama also felt that playing the Earl's human form was difficult due to how different he behaves in that appearance to the point of being one of the hardest character to voice. The character was voiced by Jason Liebrecht in the English-language versions of both series.

== Appearances ==
The manga's main antagonist, he heads the Clan of Noah and has existed for 7,000 years. The Earl tricks people who mourn for their dead friends or relatives into resurrecting them, and turns them into Akuma: weapons which consume human bodies and follow his orders.^{[ch. 1]} The only person to escape this fate is a child, Allen Walker, who destroys the Akuma of his guardian (Mana Walker) before it can take over his body using a weapon created by the supernatural fragment "Innocence". At the beginning of the manga, the Earl tries to kill a young boy whose best friend was killed by his dead mother's Akuma; he is stopped by Allen.^{[ch. 4]} The Earl then orders his followers, the Noah Family, to kill the generals of the Black Order (an organization of exorcists which opposes them);^{[ch. 29]} this begins a war with the Order. When he learns that Black Order member Lenalee Lee may have the Innocence known as the "Heart" which brings victory, the Earl lures a group of Black Order exorcists into a dimension known as Noah's Ark.^{[ch. 88]} The Ark begins to disintegrate and the Earl escapes the area with Noah Tyki Mikk, who was about to be killed by general Cross Marian.^{[ch. 129]}

The Earl then orders the Noah to send level-3 Akumas to attack Black Order headquarters and kill the exorcists.^{[ch. 139]} As the exorcists defeat the invaders,^{[ch. 157]} he curses himself for not killing Allen when they met.^{[ch. 158]} During another fight the Earl discovers that Nea, the 14th disciple of the Noah, is within Allen and he tries to recruit him as a Noah.^{[ch. 189]} Although Nea had tried to kill him several years ago, the Earl wants to remain close to him and orders Allen's kidnapping.^{[ch. 196]} When Allen leaves the Order after he loses his rights as an exorcist, the Earl and the Noah follow him. As the Earl corners Allen in a town Nea possesses the exorcist.^{[ch. 218]} He reveals that the Earl is one-half of the Millennium Earl, who vanished and was reincarnated as the twins Mana D. Campbell (マナ・D・キャンベル) and Nea D. Campbell. Mana is the present Earl).^{[ch. 219, 220]} Nea's death made the Earl lose his memory. Confused at being called "Mana" and saying that Mana "is gone", the Earl abandons Nea.^{[ch. 221]} When Allen recalls his childhood with Mana, the latter has problems expressing his grief as he claims the Millennium Earl will take him if he cries over his dog's death. When Allen accidentally destroyed Mana's with his Innocence, the Earl's suit appears to take Mana who is saved by Cross Marian. Though Allen claims he caused Mana's death, his partner Yu Kanda deduces Mana is still alive and that he is also part of the Holy War.

The character also appears in Kaya Kizaki's D.Gray-man Reverse, the second D.Gray-man light novel, in which he searches for people to create Akuma. The Earl finds many but spares a small child for an unknown reason, confusing his comrade Road Kamelot. He returns the boy to his parents, telling him to create an Akuma.

=== Characteristics ===
The Earl can be a grotesque caricature of a Victorian gentleman: a rotund figure in cape and top hat (hiding his horns), with a perpetual enormous grin and pince-nez spectacles. Although his attitude is often cheerful, he is quick to reveal his more intimidating, malicious side.^{[ch. 3]} The Earl has a golem named Lero (レロ, Rero), a pink umbrella with a small, talking jack-o-lantern at its tip. It usually talks excitedly or screams, adding its name to the end of almost every sentence. Lero, used by the Earl as a Mary Poppins-type flying umbrella, is very loyal to him and guards his sword.^{[ch. 89]} Road often takes Lero against its will, using it as a witch's broom or an ordinary umbrella.^{[ch. 20,23,24]} It has been used as a beacon to summon Akuma, to transport several exorcists to the Ark and to guard the Noah.^{[ch. 4]} Lero has a sword similar to Allen Walker's sword of exorcism, which surprises him when they clash on Noah's Ark.^{[ch. 130]} Despite his antipathy to the Noah Nea, the Earl grows depressed when he talks about him.^{[ch. 202]}

== Reception ==
The Millennium Earl has been well received by manga, anime and other publications. Reviewing the manga's first volume, A. E. Sparrow of IGN compared him to three of Batman's villains: Penguin, the Joker and Two-Face, finding those similarities appealing. Additionally, Sparrow called the Millennium Earl a "menacing villain you'll love to hate". Ross Liversidge of UK Anime Network also enjoyed the character, praising his changing design and villainous deeds. Sheena McNeil agreed, saying that the Earl works well as the series' villain with his "loving tone as indicated by the hearts in his speech bubbles and his perpetual grin, both of which are there to make him all the more sinister by masking his true nature". Tom Tonhat of the Escapist also praised the Earl's modus operandi of reviving the dead as Akuma, seeing it as a strong theme that allows viewers to sympathize with his victims. He also noted that the character's initial appearance as "nonthreatening as a portly gentleman clown" made his actions more hateful. Todd Douglass, Jr. of DVD Talk called the Earl's transformation of humans into Akuma "fiendish". Lynzee Loveridge of Anime News Network included him on the website's "7 Clowns to Haunt Your Nightmares" list. Erin Finnegan of ANN found the character enigmatic because he "hangs out in an extra-dimensional space with randomly floating jack-o'-lanterns" and compared him to Mad Pierrot from the Cowboy Bebop anime series. Neo stated that while the Earl's design feels out of place, it fits with the type of horrific character designs from the antagonists.

Brian Henson of Mania Beyond Entertainment enjoyed the Earl and the Noahs' darkening of the storyline in later story arcs, and Yussif Osman of Japanator called them evil but likeable. Anime News Network writer Anne Lauenroth criticized the Earl's characterization in early episodes of D.Gray-man Hallow; although she had considered him "part buffoon, part evil clown" (which made him "a fascinating cross between weird and scary"), his "frozen grin from hell" was less frightening. In a later review, Lauenroth wrote that the Earl had changed from an "intriguing" character during the events of Hallow and she did not understand his obsession with Nea. Chris Kirby of the Fandom Post found the character's confrontation with Allen after the exorcist leaves the Order in the next arc a long, disappointing cliffhanger; readers had to wait for the English-language version to catch up to the Japanese one. The revelation behind the Earl's true identity was praised as while the series tends to focus on battles, the manga volume focused on him and Nea focused solely on them with appealing art and wondered about the future of the two Earls considering Mana was possessing Allen, Mana's adopted son.

Neo found Junpei Takiguchi's work as the Earl Japanese actor highly superior to the one from the English dub, Jason Liebrecht. Earl's tapioca milk tea was served at the 2016 D. Gray-man Halloween Cafe in Tokyo, and related patches, mobile phone charms and a cosplay costume were marketed.
