= D.Gray-man season 3 =

D.Gray-man
- Season 3
- The North American cover of the first DVD compilation released by Funimation of the third season, featuring Allen Walker
- No. of episodes: 26

Release
- Original network: TV Tokyo
- Original release: October 2, 2007 – April 1, 2008

Season chronology
- ← Previous; Season 2 Next → Season 4

The third season of the D.Gray-man anime series, called the "2nd stage", was directed by Osamu Nabeshima and produced by TMS Entertainment. It adapts Katsura Hoshino's manga. Like the rest of the series, it follows the adventures of Allen Walker, an Exorcist that wields the power of "Innocence" to fight against the Earl of Millennium, an ancient sorcerer seeking to destroy the world with monsters called akuma.

The season initially ran from October 2, 2007, to September 30, 2008, on TV Tokyo in Japan. Thirteen DVD compilations of the second season, each containing four episodes were released by Aniplex between March 5, 2008, and March 4, 2009. In June 2016, the series was licensed by Funimation for an English-language release in North America. In August 2017, Funimation announced they would release the series' second half on home media version starting on October of the same year.

Three pieces of theme music are used for the series: one opening theme and two ending themes. The opening theme is "Doubt & Trust" by Access. The two closing themes are "The Reason Why You Are Here" (あなたがここにいる理由, Anata ga Koko ni Iru Riyū) by Rie Fu for the first 12 episodes, "Wish" by Sowelu for the 65th through the 76th episode.

== Episodes ==
No. overall	No. in season	English title / Original Japanese title	Original release date
52	1	"Raid" (Invasion); Transliteration: "Raishū" (Japanese: 来襲)	October 2, 2007
Exorcists Suman Dark, Chalker Laboun and Kazaana Reed from General Zokalo's team fight the Noah Tyki Mikk in India, but only Suman Dark survives. In China an injured man is helped by a family, but he transforms into a Fallen One (咎落ち, Togaochi), a towering white headless torso topped by a halo. Allen, the Exorcists and their allies set sail for Japan, but are confronted by a massive hoard of Akuma. However they are not the intended target and the Akuma pass by until some recognize the Exorcists on board and attack the ship. The Black Order fight valiantly, but Allen is captured and Lenalee goes in pursuit. She rescues him just as they see the Fallen One which seems to be the objective of the Akuma. The Akuma all attack the Fallen One and Lenalee sees the face of Suman in its heart, and he says that "he failed in the eyes of God".
53	2	"Fallen One" (Fallen); Transliteration: "Togaochi" (Japanese: 咎落ち)	October 9, 2007
In the past at Black Order headquarters, an experiment is carried out where a young boy is implanted with a fragment of Innocence, but he fails to synchronize and he becomes a Fallen One. The experiment is witnessed by a very young Lenalee. She realizes that this is what happened to Suman. The Suman Fallen One generates a massive amount of power, destroying not only the Akuma, but everything in the area. Lenalee desperately carries Allen towards Suman to stop Suman's Innocence from insanity and try to save him, however but Allen is drawn inside the heart as he tries to draw a child from within. Allen realizes that Suman made a deal with the Devil and betrayed his Innocence which is now trying to kill him. Cursing everything, the Suman Fallen One drifts downwards towards a town.
54	3	"The Beginning of the Night of the End" (Beginning of the Night's End); Transliteration: "Owari no Yoru no Hajimari" (Japanese: 終わりの夜のはじまり)	October 16, 2007
Allen falls to the ground while the flailing energy from the Suman Fallen One continues to destroy the nearby town. Allen tries to reason with Sulman and stop him by increasing his Innocence's synchro rate to its maximum power, but without success. Lenalee talks to Komui by phone who tells her that Suman is destined to die as his Innocence has judged him for betraying the Order and God by giving information about the Black Order to Tyki in return for a chance to live and see his family again. Allen decides to extract Suman's Innocence and to save him however the strain causes intense pain and depletes his left arm.
55	4	"A Scream" (Howl); Transliteration: "Sakebi" (Japanese: 叫び)	October 23, 2007
Suman's Fallen One body begins to disintegrate as it cuts a swathe of destruction through the landscape, destroying the town below and killing its people, commencing its final stage of decomposition. In a last desperate effort, fighting extreme pain and exhaustion, Allen separates Suman's Innocence in his arm from his body, and extracts him from the Fallen One, but although Suman's body is alive, his mind is dead. Tyki appears and takes what remains of Suman as his body transforms into strange black butterflies, although Allen still holds Suman's Innocence.
56	5	"Delete"; Transliteration: "Derīto" (Japanese: デリート)	October 30, 2007
After watching Suman crumble away in front of him, Allen meets the sadistic Noah, Tyki Mikk who explains his ability to pass through anything and control the devilish butterflies known as Teez. Cell Roron in the card Tyki holds identifies Allen as Tyki's target and to be deleted. Tyki rips off Allen's left arm and destroys his Innocence, with Allen to weak to resist and screaming in pain. Fearing that he is near his final moments of life, Allen orders Timcanpy to escape with Suman's Innocence and Timcanpy reluctantly does so. Tyki orders the surrounding Akuma to chase and catch the golden golem. Tyki then orders a Teez to tear a hole in Allen's heart to kill him slowly, and then removes a button from his coat.
57	6	"Loss and Reunion"; Transliteration: "Shōshitsu to Saikai" (Japanese: 消失と再会)	November 6, 2007
As Lavi and Lenalee travel through the air with Lavi's hammer they see Timcanpy being attacked by Akuma and save the golden golem. Timcanpy leads Lavi and Lenalee follow Timcanpy back to the bamboo forest. Allen is gone so Timcanpy shows them what happened causing leaving them distraught. When they return to the port, a man from the Asian Branch named Won explains that Allen was found and is being held at their headquarters but is not clear if Allen is dead or alive and that the Exorcists are to continue their journey to Japan immediately, without seeing Allen. They are introduced to his replacement, Miranda Lotto, who uses her anti-Akuma weapon, Time Record, to restore the badly damaged ship to its original condition and the Exorcists finally depart China. Meanwhile Allen, thinking he is dead, sees an unreal world with a lake that reflects a black moon, the Black Order in ruins and Lenalee crying alone with what appears to be Allen's corpse, only to awaken in the Asian branch, still alive.
58	7	"Asian Branch" (Asian HQ); Transliteration: "Ajia Shibu" (Japanese: アジア支部)	November 13, 2007
Allen finally opens his eyes and wonders how he is alive. Komui learns from Asian Headquarters Chief, Bak Chan, that it was Allen's own Innocence, which although was destroyed, lingered on as a cloud of particles that actually filled the hole of his damaged heart, saving his life. Allen meets Won, who is Bak's assistant; Fo, who carried him from the forest and is the guardian of the Asian Headquarters; and three division workers: Rikei, Shifu, and Lou Fa who assist in his recovery. Determined to rejoin his companions, get to Edo, and fulfil his promise to Mana, Allen vows to restore his Innocence at all costs. However, he discovers it has been dissipated into a mist and must be re-formed into his anti-Akuma weapon but it is not as easy as he thinks.
59	8	"The Road of the Pledged" (Road of an Vow); Transliteration: "Chikai no Michi" (Japanese: 誓いの道)	November 20, 2007
While trying to restore his Innocence Allen discovers that Bak Chan has a crush on Lenalee, but Bak also explains the difference between Allen's Parasitic-type Innocence and the Eqiip-type. Still unable to restore his Innocence by himself, Allen begins his special training by doing battle with Fo trying to activate his Innocence. Meanwhile, Generals Klaud Nine and Winters Sokaro return to the Black Order upon news of the deaths of their Exorcist units.
60	9	"Title"; Transliteration: "Taitoru" (Japanese: 題名 -タイトル-)	November 27, 2007
Allen and Fo continue training and Allen is able to regenerate his left arm for short periods. Back on the ship en route to Edo, Lenalee finally decides to accept the fact that Allen had to be left behind and she puts on one of the new Exorcist uniforms. However, the ship is attacked by Eshii, a powerful Level 3 Akuma, who was once a Japanese painter and uses the word "Title" before he names every attack. Lavi, and then Bookman fiercely fight against Eshii, but they are no match for him. They are saved temporarily by Miranda's power although Bookman receives a serious injury. Realizing that everyone is in serious danger, Lenalee leaves the ship to confront Eshii alone.
61	10	"Sinking Darkness" (Sinking Black); Transliteration: "Shizumu Kuro" (Japanese: 沈む黒)	December 4, 2007
Lavi continues to fight Eshii fiercely in the air and risks leaving Miranda's zone of influence. Meanwhile, the ship comes under attack from Akuma hiding up high in the clouds. Many crewmen are struck by the blasts and killed, only to be revived temporarily by Miranda's Innocence. Lenalee tells Lavi so to protect the ship while she continues the fight against Eshii. Lenalee and Eshii's battle reaches the ocean surface where Eshii reveals his most powerful ability. He uses his dark matter to create chains around Lenalee and the ship, increasing the gravity around them and dragging them underwater. Lenalee struggles to stay afloat, but Eshii pushes her down and she disappears into the ocean depths.
62	11	"Maiden Who Has Fallen into Darkness" (The Saint Who Fell Into the Darkness); Transliteration: "Yami ni Ochita Seijo" (Japanese: 闇に堕ちた聖女)	December 11, 2007
Allen's Akuma-seeking eye wakes him and he hears Lenalees's distant voice. Lenalee, floating in darkness, remembers Allen and what she said to him concerning her view of the world – caring more about her friends than the real world. She decides to make one last effort and pushes herself and her Innocence to the limits to achieve full activation and even exceeds it, defeating Eshii in the process but disappearing once again.
63	12	"Ship Stalled, Girl Remains Absent" (The Ship of Evenness and the Girl Who Didn't Return); Transliteration: "Fune Modorogi Shōjo Modorazu" (Japanese: 船斑ぎ少女戻らず)	December 18, 2007
The Exorcists and sailors and on board the ship struggle to protect it from the Akuma hidden in the clouds far above them. However, with Eshii's destruction, Lavi is able to clear the clouds and send Krory upwards towards them. Krory finds only three large Akuma and infects them with his own blood, poisoning and destroying them. The Exorcists now anxiously wait for Lenalee's return, but Lavi can't wait and he uses his hammer to search for Lenalee. Suddenly, he sees a yellow Akuma above the ocean holding Lenalee in a crystal-like shield created by her Innocence to protect her. The level 2 Akuma reveals that it was converted by Cross Marian.
64	13	"Message"; Transliteration: "Messēji" (Japanese: メッセージ)	December 25, 2007
Lavi returns to the ship with Lenalee in a crystal-like shield and Chomesuke the yellow Akuma. Bookman can't understand why Lenalee's equip-type Innocence acted on its own to save her. Chomesuke delivers a warning from Cross and explains the dire situation in Japan where he is now attempting to destroy an Akuma factory in Edo. The crystal begins to melt, and Lenalee is freed, but she is unable to walk. Nevertheless, the group of Exorcists with three surviving sailors decide to push forward. To achieve this, Miranda must deactivate her Innocence, causing the ship to revert to real time with Anita, Mahoja and its crew willingly sacrificing themselves, and they all disappear into the sea. Chomesuke propels a lifeboat with the survivors towards Japan.
65	14	"Landing"; Transliteration: "Jōriku" (Japanese: 上陸)	January 8, 2008
The five Exorcists and three surviving sailors finally arrive in Japan, but they are in bad shape from their injuries. Chomesuke changes into her human form, a young woman named Sachiko. She tells them that Japan has long been under the Earl's control. On the way to Edo, the group witnesses one of Sachiko's friends being killed and eaten by three Level 3 Akuma. Tyki meets up with Jasdero and David who have been assigned to kill General Cross and travel together to meet the Earl. Chomesuke is captured by one of the Level 3 Akuma, who proves to be more than a match for both Lavi and Krory. However, Lavi cleverly attracts the attention of the other two Level 3s, and the three Akuma begin fighting between each other over who will kill the Exorcists, who seize their chance to escape. Meanwhile the Millennium Earl gathers his Noah in Edo.
66	15	"Confusion and Impatience" (Disturbance and Impatience); Transliteration: "Konwaku to Shōsō" (Japanese: 困惑と焦燥)	January 15, 2008
Allen trains endlessly with Fo, trying to reactivate his Innocence as he desperately wants to return to his friends and to fight the Akuma alongside them, but he makes little progress. Some within the China Branch are concerned that Allen's presence may attract Akuma. Fo disguises herself as Lou Fa and talks with Allen, reminding him that he fights not for the sake of fighting, but for something precious to him. Allen remembers that he is fighting for the sake of his friends. Meanwhile, Tyki Mikk checks with the Earl to see if the Cell Roron is correct about Allen's existence. He then sends a Level 3 Akuma and a Teez to China to kill Allen.
67	16	"Heading to Edo" (To Edo); Transliteration: "Edo e" (Japanese: 江戸へ)	January 22, 2008
Lenalee and the others head towards Edo and are ambushed by the Level 3 Akuma that they encountered earlier. They manage to evade them for a while, but eventually, they are surrounded. Before they can do anything, however, the Earl summons all Akuma to Edo, so they leave without doing anything. Chomesuke also parts from the group because the Earl's order is too strong for her to resist, but she manages to tell them that the Earl is at the Edo Castle. Meanwhile, while training with Fo in the Asian Branch, Allen's eye activates. The Earl orders his Akuma army to kill General Cross and General Tiedoll. Lavi and the Exorcists appear and challenge them in order to protect the Generals. After Lavi and Krory defeat three Level 3 Akuma, Tyki Mikk recognizes them and challenges Lavi, telling him that Allen is still alive, but he had sent a Level 3 Akuma to kill him.
68	17	"Silence"; Transliteration: "Chinmoku" (Japanese: 沈黙)	January 29, 2008
Allen slowly improves his fighting technique, but he still cannot cause his Innocence to materialize. He focuses deeply on returning to his friends, causing his Innocence to show high energy readings. However, just as the energy readings peak, Allen's left eye activates which causes Allen great pain and alarms the scientists. He continues training, and causes a peak in his Innocence energy, however at that point, the pain spikes and Allen faints. Suddenly, Fo senses something strange as Tyki Mikk's Level 3 assassin approaches, and she tells Bak to hide Allen. The Akuma blows a hole through Fo, breaking her defensive barrier. Allen's left eye immediately activates and omits a strange sensation. Fo tells Allen to run, but Allen refuses. At that moment, the Akuma fires a beam of dark matter, piercing Allen's chest.
69	18	"Invasion"; Transliteration: "Shinnyū" (Japanese: 侵入)	February 5, 2008
The beam from Tyki's Level 3 Akuma assassin partially breaks down Allen's molecular structure, making his body highly unstable and transparent. Bak awakens the guardian deity with a blood seal on his hand, trapping the Akuma in a web of light and the Asian Branch enters lockdown. The group then retreats with the wounded Fo and the unstable Allen. Bak attempts to seal them off with the guardian deity, however before he can finish, the Akuma catches up with them. Fo takes the form of Allen to sacrifice herself in order to allow Allen and the others get to safety. She and enters the passage to face the Akuma as Bak seals the section. Allen realizes that he fights for the sake of both humans and Akuma and insists on rescuing Fo, even at the risk to his own life. His Innocence manifests itself around him, and he warps to the door, which Bak finally unseals. Allen enters the room just as Fo is about to be killed by the Akuma and jumps onto the Akuma's back and injures it with his right hand.
70	19	"God's Clown"; Transliteration: "Kami no Dōke" (Japanese: 神ノ道化)	February 12, 2008
Allen engages the Level 3 Akuma in battle. He speaks to the soul trapped within the Akuma which had previously been calling out to him and it asks Allen to save him. However, because his body's composition is unstable, Allen literally begins to fade during the fight. When Allen is almost atomized, the Akuma turns on Bak and Fo piercing them with beams of anti-matter. Enraged, Allen finally decides that he will save humans with his right hand and Akuma with his left hand. The true form of his Innocence is revealed and he easily destroys the Level 3 Akuma and liberates its soul. Before the Akuma dies, it tells Allen of the gathering of the Earl and the Noah in Edo. He also tells Allen the location of Noah's Ark that can take him directly to Edo. It's revealed that the true from Allen's Innocence is called God's Clown, also known as the Crowned Clown. Allen now has a gloved white right hand, a long black left arm with razor sharp talons for fingers, a white cowl that shoots web-like projectiles and is fitted with a mask.
71	20	"The Name Chronicled" (The Signed Name); Transliteration: "Shirusareta Namae" (Japanese: 記された名前)	February 19, 2008
After Allen recovers many tests are done on his left arm which has completely synchronized with his body. Bak and Allen decide on a new name for Allen's newly evolved Innocence: God's Clown, or the Crowned Clown. The Asian Branch also analyse the Ark which is a dimensional transporter. Allen is then given a new Exorcist coat by Wong, and Bak gives him a wireless communicator in a form of a gold earring, which allows him to talk to Komui. As Allen bids farewell to the Asian Branch, preparing to head off to Edo via Noah's Ark, Lou Fa, Rikei, and Shifu return his deck of cards. The episode ends with Lavi and the Exorcists preparing to engage in battle with Tyki Mikk.
72	21	"Showdown in the Capital" (Decisive Battle in the Imperial City); Transliteration: "Teito Kessen" (Japanese: 帝都決戦)	February 26, 2008
The battle between the Exorcists and the Earl's forces begins in Edo. While Lavi fights Tyki, the Earl combines all the Akuma into two giant Akuma which attack the Exorcists. Lavi attacks Tyki with a new move, a combination of the Fire and Heaven Seals. The Exorcists attack the Combined Akuma, but their attacks have little effect. One Combined Akuma uses its Evil Star Gita attack and destroys much of the battlefield. Chomesuke sacrifices herself to enable Lavi, Krory, and Bookman to attack the Combined Akuma's head, its weak point. Although they succeed in knocking it down, the Akuma manages to get back up again and Tyki rejoins the attack. Meanwhile, Allen enters the Ark and is surprised to find that it is a lovely place filled with white buildings, just like any other country. When he expresses his concern for his friends, Komui cheers him up by telling him to think about happy thoughts. Kanda, Marie, and General Tiedoll arrive in Edo, overlooking the scene of the battle between the Exorcists and the Akuma.
73	22	"Kanda Joins the Battle" (Kanda Engages in Battle); Transliteration: "Kanda, Sansen" (Japanese: 神田、参戦)	March 4, 2008
Bookman and Krory continue their assault on the Combined Akuma, but their attacks continue to fail while Lavi is repeatedly beaten down by Tyki. Meanwhile, Miranda can no longer maintain her Innocence's barrier over the storage room, giving Tyki the opportunity to capture Lenalee. Chaoji and his comrades vainly attempt to help her, but just as Tyki is about to deal them the killing blow, Kanda intervenes and begins a fight with Tyki. With Lavi's help, he manages to save Lenalee. Tyki prepares to counterattack, but he retreats when ordered to by the Millennium Earl. Marie uses his Noel Organon's ability to paralyze one of the Combined Akuma. Kanda then reveals Mugen's second illusion, Nigentou, and destroys the Akuma in one slash. However, before the Exorcists can relax, the Earl fires off a black orb of energy that grows larger and larger, engulfing Edo in the process.
74	23	"Edo Annihilated" (Edo's Annihilation); Transliteration: "Edo Shōmetsu" (Japanese: 江戸消滅)	March 11, 2008
The Earl's black orb of energy completely destroys Edo. The Exorcists are left in various conditions, though General Cross' group is more severely wounded. Lenalee, however, is protected by her Innocence, which once again encases her in a crystal-like form. This form catches the Earl's interest, and he sends Tyki, Skin, and the Combined Akuma to obtain her Innocence. Kanda fights Tyki, Lavi and Marie confront Skin, and General Tiedoll confronts the Combined Akuma. He activates his Maker of Eden Innocence and stops it. However, with all the Exorcists doing battle with the Noah, Lenalee is left unguarded, giving the Earl a chance to breach Lenalee's protective Innocence barrier. As he is about to grab her, a white arm stops him. Allen has arrived with the Ark, and he and the Earl meet face to face once again.
75	24	"Clown and Auguste"; Transliteration: "Kuraun to Ōgyusuto" (Japanese: クラウンとオーギュスト)	March 18, 2008
After returning to Edo, Allen greets the Earl and vows to protect Lenalee. The Earl retaliates and thus, begins fighting Allen. During the fight, the Earl reveals some of his hidden abilities including turning Lero into a sword. Eventually, Allen hits the Earl with a Cross Grave attack, but the Earl seems unaffected. The Earl laughs and assures Allen that they will continue their fight another time, and he fires a purple orb of energy, which causes a massive explosion. When the smoke clears, The Earl, Tyki, and Skin are gone, leaving the Exorcists confused. Inside the Ark, the Earl reveals to Tyki that both Allen and his Innocence are still alive. In Edo, the Exorcists seize their chance to heal and regroup. Despite General Tiedoll's warning of the upcoming dangers, General Cross' group decides to keep moving forward. Lenalee awakens and thanks Allen for trying so hard to save Suman. A pentacle suddenly appears on the ground, and Lenalee is kidnapped by Lero and disappears.
76	25	"A Key and Noah's Doors" (Key and Noah's Door); Transliteration: "Kagi to Noa no Tobira" (Japanese: 鍵とノアの扉)	March 25, 2008
Lenalee is sucked into a portal created by Lero. Allen reaches into the portal and is pulled in as well. Lavi, Kanda, Krory, and Chaoji follow suit. Those left behind see a strange object materialize in the sky; the infamous Noah's Ark. Allen and his friends find themselves inside the Ark and see a projection of the Earl which tells them that they will be deleted in three hours along with the Ark. The remaining Exorcists on in Edo are then attacked by a horde of Combined Akuma. Marie attacks with his Noel Organon ability while Tiedoll attacks with his Maker of Eden, Art, a gigantic white figure. Miranda tells Bookman that everyone's time is still inside her Innocence, but any new injuries they receive will not heal. Meanwhile inside the Ark, Tyki appears and Allen realizes that Tyki is the Noah that destroyed his Innocence. Tyki gives them a key to an exit door created by Road, situated at the Ark's highest point on top of a tower. The Exorcists enter a room in the tower and are confronted by the Noah, Skin Boric. Kanda recognizes Skin as the Noah targeting General Tiedoll. He tells the others to go ahead and prepares to challenge Skin by himself.
77	26	"The Skinn Bolic Room" (Skin Bolic's Room); Transliteration: "Sukin Borikku Rūmu" (Japanese: スキン･ボリック･ルーム)	April 1, 2008
Kanda decides to fight the Noah, Skin Bolic, and tells the others to go ahead. They refuse and insist on staying with Kanda until he finally attacks them in frustration. They go ahead after Lenalee makes promise to follow them. Nonetheless, they worry because they know that the room will be destroyed once it finishes downloading. Now alone, Kanda starts to fight Skin one-on-one. Tyki Mikk watches these events in a room with Road. Skin transforms into a golden armored giant and starts battling Kanda. In Edo, Marie and Tiedoll continue to fight the Combined Akuma.

== Home media release ==
=== Japanese ===
Aniplex (Japan, Region 2)
Name	Date	Discs	Episodes
Volume 1	March 5, 2008	1	52–55
Volume 2	April 2, 2008	1	56–59
Volume 3	May 9, 2008	1	60–63
Volume 4	June 4, 2008	1	64–67
Volume 5	July 2, 2008	1	68–71
Volume 6	August 6, 2008	1	72–75
Volume 7	September 3, 2008	1	76–79

=== English ===
Funimation (North America, Region 1)
Name	Date	Discs	Episodes
Season Three, Part One	October 10, 2017	3	52–64
Season Three, Part Two	December 12, 2017	3	65–77

== See also ==
- List of D.Gray-man episodes
- List of D.Gray-man chapters
- List of D.Gray-man characters
