= D.Gray-man season 1 =

D.Gray-man
- Season 1
- The North American cover of the first DVD compilation released by Funimation of the first season, featuring Allen Walker
- No. of episodes: 26

Release
- Original network: TV Tokyo
- Original release: October 3, 2006 – April 3, 2007

Season chronology
- Next → Season 2

The first season of the D.Gray-man anime series, was directed by Osamu Nabeshima and produced by TMS Entertainment. The series adapt Katsura Hoshino's manga with the same name. The season follows the first adventures of Allen Walker, an Exorcist that wields the power of "Innocence" to fight against The Millennium Earl, an ancient sorcerer seeking to destroy the world with monsters called Akuma. Joining an organization of Exorcists known as the "Black Order", Allen teams up with multiple soldiers to collect other Innocences.

The season initially ran from October 3, 2006, to April 3, 2007, in Japan on TV Setouchi and TV Tokyo. The English adaptation of the first season has been licensed by Funimation and was released in 2009 in North America. Thirteen DVD compilations of the season have been released by Aniplex between February 2, 2007, and February 6, 2008.

Three pieces of theme music are used for the episodes: one opening theme and two closing themes. The opening theme is "Innocent Sorrow" by Japanese rock band Abingdon Boys School, used for the first twenty-five episodes. The two closing themes are "Snow Kiss" by Nirgilis, utilized for the first thirteen episodes, "Pride of Tomorrow" by June for the next twelve episodes.

== Episodes ==
No.	English title / Original Japanese title	Original release date
1	"The Boy Who Hunts Akuma"; Transliteration: "Akuma o Karu Shōnen" (Japanese: アクマを狩る少年)	October 3, 2006
Allen Walker and his golem, Timcampy have recently arrived in London, planning to visit the Black Order Headquarters. Meanwhile, Officers Moore and Charles are investigating a supposedly haunted church. While searching this abandoned building, Moore and Charles are separated due to Allen's "kidnapping" of Moore. After he is handcuffed to a chair, Allen tries to explain his situation to Moore when Charles is suddenly killed. Since Moore was unconscious due to the attack, Allen is suspected of Charles's death. Allen attempts to tell the chief that an Akuma killed Charles and that he would like to help. However, due to the disbelief of the chief, Allen is placed under house arrest while the rest of the police unit investigate the church themselves. During his stay at Moore's home, Allen explains to her about Akuma and later on, he meets Moore's brother-in-law, Marc, who is the Akuma that killed Charles and countless others who visited the church. Upon investigating, Allen finds out that Moore's sister, Claire, is the soul entrapped in the Akuma. The Akuma later kills the police units excluding Moore and later, Allen destroys it by using his anti-Akuma weapon.
2	"The Black Order"; Transliteration: "Kuro no Kyōdan" (Japanese: 黒の教団)	October 10, 2006
Allen finally arrives at the Black Order Headquarters. Due to a misunderstanding, everyone thinks he is an Akuma. Supervisor Komui sends Yu Kanda to confront him and damages his anti-Akuma weapon. Eventually, it is resolved when Komui finds a letter of introduction from Allen's master, Cross Marian. Afterwards, Allen is allowed into the Headquarters and is given a tour by Komui's sister, Lenalee Lee. After getting his arm repaired by Komui, Allen is examined by Hevlaska, an Exorcist who is able to measure his synchronization ratio. In addition, she predicts that Allen will create a powerful "Destroyer of Time" in a dark future. From Komui, Allen learns more about the war between the Earl and the Innocence.
3	"The Ghost of Martel"; Transliteration: "Matēru no Bōrei" (Japanese: マテールの亡霊)	October 17, 2006
In the Black Order cafeteria, Allen intervenes in a confrontation between Kanda and a Finder, further inflaming Kanda's animosity towards him. Later, Komui sends Allen and Kanda on a mission to recover a fragment of Innocence in the ruins of Martel, a town in southern Italy before it can be taken by the Akuma. There is a legend that a ghost roams Mater, killing anyone who wanders near it. Along the way, Toma, a Finder tells Allen how strange occurrences in history are usually related to the Innocence. Meanwhile, the Finders in Martel have captured two Akuma in barriers, but they are attacked by a third one. When the two Exorcists arrive, Allen runs to fight the third Akuma and to save the surviving Finders, while Kanda rescues two Finders Guzol and Lala, who are protected within a barrier. During Allen's fight, the Akuma evolves to Level 2 and calls himself an Akuma Clown. Kanda refuses to help Allen and leaves with the fragment of Innocence and the two Finders. The episode ends with a stunned Allen being attacked by another version of himself.
4	"Old Man of the Soil and a Lonely Night's Aria" (Aria of the Land and the Night Sky); Transliteration: "Tsuchiokina to Kūya no Aria" (Japanese: 土翁と空夜のアリア)	October 24, 2006
Allen realizes that the mirror image of himself is the Level 2 Akuma Clown which has the ability to imitate the looks and powers of anybody it touches. It defeats Allen and, taking the shape of Toma, goes in search of the Innocence. Guzol tells Kanda that he is the Ghost of Martel which is not really a ghost but a moving and singing doll. The Akuma Clown finds Allen and Kanda, but it is too powerful for them to defeat so they escape with Toma into in a secret underground chamber beneath the city. There they find Guzol unconscious and Lala singing and realise that the young girl is actually the doll and the Ghost of Martel.
5	"Let Me Hear the Lullaby" (Sing Me A Lullaby); Transliteration: "Komoriuta o Kikasete" (Japanese: 子守唄を聞かせて)	October 31, 2006
After the truth about Lala is revealed, she attacks Allen in desperation, but then promises to give him her heart of Innocence after the dying Guzol passes. She tells them the history of Martel, the creation of the dolls, the society's eventual decline and arrival of Guzol as a young boy 500 years later. A conflict arises between Allen and Kanda because Kanda does not want to wait, however the Akuma Clown attacks and mortally wounds both Guzol and Lala, taking the Innocence. Allen's anger at the Akuma Clown transforms his Innocence into new types of weapons, thus initiating the final battle with Allen and Kanda uniting to destroy the Akuma Clown.
6	"That Which Calls Forth Disaster" (That Which Calls Out Disaster); Transliteration: "Wazawai o Yobu Mono" (Japanese: 災いを呼ぶもの)	November 7, 2006
On the way back to the Headquarters with the fragment of Innocence from Martel, Allen saves a boy named Jean from an Akuma. Jean's father works in the Black Order Headquarters and Jean is determined in finding and exterminating Akuma. Despite Allen's warnings, Jean heads out with his friend Leo to hunt them down. Allen goes to talk to Jean, but Leo is now an Akuma and he has taken Jean to the murderous Millennium Earl. Allen follows and confronts the Millennium Earl who remembers Allen from the past, and that Allen turned his own father into an Akuma.
7	"Tombstone of Memories" (Gravestone of Remembrance); Transliteration: "Kioku no Bohyō" (Japanese: 記憶の墓標)	November 14, 2006
Allen explains his tragic past, about how he brought his adoptive father, Mana Walker back from the dead as an Akuma and then had to destroy him, and how he met General Cross Marian, one of the five Generals of the Black Order. Lenalee joins Allen in the cemetery to help destroy the Akuma and help Jean's friend Leo, also an Akuma, to find peace in the nether world.
8	"The Black Order Annihilation Incident" (The Black Order's Devastating Incident); Transliteration: "Kuro no Kyōdan Kaimetsu Jiken!?" (Japanese: 黒の教団壊滅事件!?)	November 21, 2006
Komui's latest invention, a robot named Sir Komurin II, is designed to make Exorcists stronger, however it goes out of control after drinking a cup of coffee and starts chasing Allen. Johnny modifies a cleaning robot to combat it without success, and Kanda refuses to help. The robot is eventually stopped and Allen's welcome home party goes ahead. Meanwhile, the Millennium Earl holds a dinner with several strange humans with golden eyes and crosses on their foreheads, one of which is a young girl with spiky dark hair, Road Kamelot.
9	"The Rewinding Town" (The Rewinding Town); Transliteration: "Makimodoshi no Machi" (Japanese: 巻き戻しの街)	November 28, 2006
Allen and Lenalee are sent to investigate a town where the day of October 28 keeps repeating itself. Once there, they see a woman named Miranda Lotto being attacked by an Akuma demanding the location of Innocence. They believe that she is somehow linked to the strange phenomenon of the town. Meanwhile the Millennium Earl sends Road Kamelot to the Rewinding Town to find the Innocence fragment.
10	"The Bad Luck Woman's Innocence" (Innocence of the Unhappy Woman); Transliteration: "Fukō na Onna no Inosensu" (Japanese: 不幸な女のイノセンス)	December 5, 2006
Allen and Lenalee resolve to help Miranda and prevent time repeating itself. Miranda tells them about her awkward and unhappy life until she found empathy with an abandoned and unwanted grandfather clock. They then see the clock appear to rewind time during the night. To lift her spirits, Allen and Lenalee tell Miranda stories of their past. Meanwhile Road Kamelot has been watching their every move and hears that the clock is the Innocence. She captures Lenalee and Miranda, revealing to Allen that she is not an Akuma, but one of the Noah Clan.
11	"Miranda Lotto's Feelings" (Miranda Lotto's Sentiments); Transliteration: "Miranda Rottō no Omoi" (Japanese: ミランダ•ロットーの思い)	December 12, 2006
The realization that Road Kamelot is a human horrifies Allen, who cannot understand why a human and Akuma work together. To prove herself different from regular humans, Road stabs herself with Allen's Innocence, only to recover right in front of him. She stabs Allen in the cursed eye, and tries to kill Miranda, but Allen rescues her, exhausting his energy. When Miranda tries to protect him from Road, the Innocence within her is activated, creating a protective barrier around Miranda, Allen and Lenalee, giving them time to recover. Allen and Lenalee exit the barrier and prepare to fight Road and her three Akuma.
12	"And Snow Falls Over the Town" (And in the Town the Snow Falls); Transliteration: "Soshite Machi ni Yuki ga Furi..." (Japanese: そして街に雪が降り...)	December 19, 2006
Allen and Lenalee fight for survival against Road and her Akuma. Road knows that Allen became and Exorcist to save the souls of Akuma, so she orders an Akuma to self-destruct. An Akuma who dies this way will never be saved and their soul will be lost forever. Desperately, Allen tries to exorcise the Akuma before it happens, but the Akuma explodes, its soul begging for help. Intrigued at Allen's concern for the Akuma, Road laughs and Allen is unable to bring himself to kill the Noah. Road leaves via a portal, and the Exorcists, along with Miranda, are returned to Miranda's home. Miranda turns off her Innocence after some persuasion by Allen and Lenalee because she knows that the injuries they sustained earlier will reappear. Allen and Lenalee return to headquarters to recover, and Miranda leaves the town, planning to become an Exorcist.
13	"With the Coat" (Along With a Coat); Transliteration: "Kōto to Tomo ni" (Japanese: 団服(コート)と共に)	December 26, 2006
The Millennium Earl pursues his objective of seeking out people in despair who've lost their loved ones to create more Akuma. While recuperating Allen meets Lavi, an experienced Exorcist, and the Black Order begins to use the Bookmen to gather information about the Noah Clan. Allen is unsure about being an Exorcist when it involves killing humans like the Noah, however Lavi explains the significance of wearing the Exorcist uniform. Because Exorcists cannot distinguish disguised Akuma from humans, the uniform is a way to attract Akuma to them and protect humanity. This is dramatically borne out when they are attacked by a group of Akuma who initially seem like normal citizens.
14	"The Leaf of Revival" (Leaves Of Rebirth); Transliteration: "Fukkatsu no Ha" (Japanese: 復活の葉)	January 9, 2007
Allen, Lavi, Kanda and Bookman are sent to investigate a mysterious rapid snowstorm, which could be caused by Innocence. Here they meet a young girl and her father, who is obsessed with finding something called Leaves Of Rebirth to bring back his dead son. Meanwhile, also searching for a possible Innocence in the same area are three Level 2 Akuma under the command of a Noah named Skin Boric. The two groups meet and a battle ensues. Kanda succeeds in driving them off, but Allen is left unconscious.
15	"Beyond the Snowstorm" (The End of the Snowstorm); Transliteration: "Fubuki no Hate" (Japanese: 吹雪の果て)	January 16, 2007
Allen, Lavi and Kanda continue their search for the Leaf of Revival, which they assume to be the Innocence. Lavi and Kanda find the tree which is the location of the Innocence after all, but the three Level 2 Akuma attack to retrieve it from them. When Allen arrives, the three of them manage to defeat the Akuma.
16	"Millennium Swordsman" (The Millennium Swordsman); Transliteration: "Sennen no Kenshi" (Japanese: 千年の剣士)	January 23, 2007
In ancient Rome, Vittorio, a powerful swordsman vowed to fight for Princess Sandra. While searching for Innocence in Rome, Kanda encounters Vittorio. When Kanda has not returned after a while, Komui asks Allen and Lenalee to go to Rome to investigate. On the way they read about the history of the swordsman and the Princess. In Rome, they learn that Claudia, the young daughter of the wealthy Sardinis has disappeared, but he refuses to help her overbearing father and arrogant fiancé, Viscount Paretti, a penniless nobleman to find her. At the ruins of the colosseum, numerous Akuma attack the bounty hunters, and Allen and Lenalee defend them. Vittorio appears, as does Kanda. Kanda's Finder explains that they have been fighting for days and Kanda has not activated his Innocence so that Vittorio's would not be activated. They rejoin their battle and Kanda is badly wounded.
17	"Pride of the Swordsman" (The Pride of the Swordsman); Transliteration: "Kenshitachi no Hokori" (Japanese: 剣士達の誇り)	January 30, 2007
Allen continues the attack on Vittorio whose wounds are healed by the Innocence in his sword. Claudia orders Vittorio to stop fighting, but she refuses to return home. Allen and Lenalee suspect that Vittorio thinks Claudia is the Princess Sandra and the Akuma are her suitors. Leaving Kanda at the Sardini household to recover and think of a strategy to defeat Vittorio, they return to the colosseum. Vittorio attacks Allen, but Kanda appears and intervenes, cutting off Vittorio's arm and severing the link to the Innocence in his sword. Vittorio dies, admitting that he knew Claudia was not the Princess, but that he happily fought for her anyway.
18	"Lenalee's Love" (Lenalee's Love); Transliteration: "Rinarī no Koi" (Japanese: リナリーの恋)	February 6, 2007
Seeing Lenalee and Russell going out together, Komui assumes that they are dating and in rage, chases after them with his newly built, Komlin II. Meanwhile, a weak Akuma with amazing transformation skills decides to target Lenalee. Concerned about Komui, Allen, Lavi and the Science Division work together in an attempt to stop Komui's reckless behavior however the Akuma keeps being on the receiving end of Komui's explosive inventions including his super robot Komlin III.
19	"Vampire of the Solitary Castle" (The Vampire in the Old Castle); Transliteration: "Kojō no Kyūketsuki" (Japanese: 古城の吸血鬼)	February 13, 2007
While on a mission to search for General Cross in Romania, Allen is beseeched by several villagers complaining about a "vampire problem". That night Allen is attacked by a number of Akuma. Lavi and Bookman join Allen to chase them off, but Allen temporarily loses the use of his left eye that can see Akuma. The next night they go with a group of villagers to question Baron Arystar Krory at his castle and suspect that he is a vampire after he attacks one of the villagers.
20	"Go for it, Exorcists!" (Do Your Best, Mr. Exorcist); Transliteration: "Ganbare Ekusoshisuto-sama" (Japanese: がんばれエクソシスト様)	February 20, 2007
Allen and Lavi decide to stop Arystar Krory from harming the villagers although he is not an Akuma, and hold him off although Allen is bitten. Back at the castle Krory regrets becoming a vampire again and begs forgiveness from his beautiful lover, Eliade. Allen and Lavi go to the castle and when they arrive they find Eliade feeding the dead villager to carnivorous plants. They are watched by Eliade as they discover a graveyard with signs of Akuma blood which leaves them confused about what's really happening at the castle.
21	"Krory Attacks" (Krory, Attacks); Transliteration: "Kurōrī, Shūgeki" (Japanese: クロウリー、襲撃)	February 27, 2007
Eliade convinces Baron Arystar Krory to drink her blood to strengthen himself against the Exorcists. Allen and Lavi discover that the graves contain dead Akuma who they presume were killed by Krory. Krory attacks Allen and Lavi thinking that they are monsters, but Allen accidentally finds a hidden chamber, and encounters Eliade who reveals that she is an Akuma. Allen and Lavi separately deduce that Krory is an Exorcist who drinks the blood of Akuma. When Eliade is about to kill the unconscious Allen, his arm acts of its own accord and stops her. Allen regains consciousness and decides he must fight her.
22	"The Truth about Eliade" (Eliade's Truth); Transliteration: "Eriāde no Shinjitsu" (Japanese: エリアーデの真実)	March 6, 2007
While Lavi and Krory continue their battle outside the castle, Allen fights Eliade who changes into her Akuma form. Lavi defeats Krory and goes to Allen's aid. Eliade tells the story of how she became and Akuma, and her quest to be accepted as a beautiful woman instead of an ugly Akuma. She despised the weakness of men until she met Krory. As Allen's cursed eye becomes stronger Lavi and Krory are able to see her trapped soul. Krory realises that Eliade is the enemy, and she tries to kill him. They then engage in a battle to the death.
23	"The Vampire Whom I Loved" (The Vampire I Loved); Transliteration: "Watashi ga Aishita Kyūketsuki" (Japanese: ワタシが愛した吸血鬼)	March 13, 2007
Krory tell of his life of loneliness tending his grandfather's collection until he met Eliade. Krory and Eliade continue to fight, and her balls of dehydration suck Krory's body dry. With his last bit of energy, he leaps on her and sucks her life-giving Akuma blood and she dies, releasing the soul trapped inside her. Krory is devastated by her death, however Allen convinces Krory to join them and become an Exorcist.
24	"Krory's New Beginning" (Krory's Journey); Transliteration: "Kurōrī Tabidachi" (Japanese: クロウリー旅立ち)	March 20, 2007
After finishing the mission that General Cross left for them, to recruit Krory, Allen and Lavi accompany Krory back to their Headquarters. Krory is inexperienced to the outside world, and gets hustled in a game of cards by three men. Allen proves his cheating skills when he wins everything back. One of the men, Tyki, gives Allen a pack of cards before they leave, but Tyki is revealed to be a Noah and an ally of the Millennium Earl. After some difficulty in entering the Black Order headquarters because of Akuma blood in his veins, Krory is inducted as an official Exorcist.
25	"The General's Chains" (The General's Chain); Transliteration: "Gensui no Kusari" (Japanese: 元帥の鎖)	March 27, 2007
Having been sent by Komui to deliver a package to General Kevin Yeegar, Allen arrives at Holland, but the General does not show up. Finding out that General Yeegar went to Belgium to investigate a newly discovered Innocence, Allen heads for Belgium as well. There he meets Yeegar for the first time and discovers what a nice and kind person he truly is.
26	"The Beginning of the End" (Beginning of the End); Transliteration: "Shūmatsu e no Makuake" (Japanese: 終末への幕開け)	April 3, 2007
The Black Order receives messages from around Europe that the Millennium Earl has declared war. General Yeegar is confronted by two of the Noah, Road Kamelot and Tyki Mikk along with a hoard of Akuma. Allen and Lenalee are sent to his aid. Yeegar proves himself more than capable of dealing with the Akuma, but falls victim to Road and her manipulation of memories of his tragic class. The Millennium Earl then retrieves and destroys the fragments of Innocence held by Yeegar. Road sings an eerie song about the Earl's search for the Heart of Innocence, and when the Exorcists finally arrive to help Yeegar, her song is the only thing he can utter. Komui explains that the 'Heart of Innocence' is what both the Black Order and Millennium Earl are searching for.

== Home media release ==
=== Japanese ===
Aniplex (Japan, Region 2)
Name	Date	Discs	Episodes
Volume 1	February 7, 2007	1	1–4
Volume 2	March 7, 2007	1	5–8
Volume 3	April 4, 2007	1	9–12
Volume 4	May 2, 2007	1	13–16
Volume 5	June 6, 2007	1	17–20
Volume 6	July 4, 2007	1	21–24
Volume 7	August 1, 2007	1	25–28

=== English ===
Funimation (North America, Region 1)
Name	Date	Discs	Episodes
Season One, Part One	March 31, 2009	2	1–13
Season One, Part Two	June 23, 2009	2	14–26

Manga Entertainment (United Kingdom, Region 2)
Name	Date	Discs	Episodes
Season One, Part One	February 22, 2010	2	1–13
Season One, Part Two	April 12, 2010	2	14–26

== See also ==
- List of D.Gray-man episodes
- List of D.Gray-man chapters
- List of D.Gray-man characters
- List of D.Gray-man Hallow episodes
