= D.Gray-man season 2 =

D.Gray-man
- Season 2
- The North American cover of the first DVD compilation released by Funimation of the second season, featuring Lenalee Lee
- No. of episodes: 25

Release
- Original network: TV Tokyo
- Original release: April 10 – September 25, 2007

Season chronology
- ← Previous; Season 1 Next → Season 3

The second season of the D.Gray-man anime series was directed by Osamu Nabeshima and produced by TMS Entertainment. The series adapt Katsura Hoshino's manga. The season follows the first adventures of Allen Walker, an Exorcist that wields the power of "Innocence" to fight against The Millennium Earl, an ancient sorcerer seeking to destroy the world with monsters called Akuma.

The season initially ran from October 3, 2006, to April 3, 2007, in Japan on TV Setouchi and TV Tokyo. The English adaptation of the first season has been licensed by Funimation and was released in 2009 in North America. Thirteen DVD compilations of the season have been released by Aniplex between February 2, 2007, and February 6, 2008.

Three pieces of theme music are used for the episodes: one opening theme and two closing themes. The opening theme is Nami Tamaki's "Brightdown". The ending themes are Surface's "To the Continuation of the Dream" (夢の続きへ, Yume no Tsuzuki e) from episode 26 to 38, and the rest of the season uses Nana Kitade's "Antoinette Blue".

== Episodes ==
No. overall	No. in season	English title / Original Japanese title	Original release date
27	1	"My Mentor, General Cross" (My Master, General Cross); Transliteration: "Waga Shi, Kurosu Gensui" (Japanese: わが師、クロス元帥)	April 10, 2007
The Exorcists are divided into groups to protect the four Generals; Cloud, Zokalo, Cross and Tiedoll. Allen and Lenalee are assigned to General Cross. On the way, Allen tells Lenalee his bitter memories of Cross and the tragedy of a good friend Nalei who became an Akuma to bring his sister back to life after she was killed. It was how he learned about the nature of Akuma and the tortured souls trapped within them.
28	2	"Exorcist Krory" (Krory the Exorcist); Transliteration: "Ekusoshisuto Kurōrī" (Japanese: エクソシスト•クロウリー)	April 17, 2007
Krory, Lavi, and Bookman investigate several villages where people keep disappearing. They meet a friendly and mysterious Level 2 Akuma who works on a farm and plays with the children. Days later, they receive news of disappearances in another village, and when they investigate, the village is in flames. Krory believes there is another Akuma and goes after it viciously but it escapes. Krory lowers his guard as he believes in the possibility of a good Akuma, but the friendly Akuma shows its true self when a fragment of Innocence is revealed after the church's stained glass window is broken. Krory is forced to destroy it, and accept the fate of being an Exorcist.
29	3	"The One Who Sells Souls, Part 1" (The Soul Sellers, Part One); Transliteration: "Tamashii o Uru Mono – Zenpen" (Japanese: 魂を売る者•前編)	April 24, 2007
The Millennium Earl is seen answering several phone calls and confirming business deals. Allen and Lenalee arrive at Liverpool to meet "Mother", who took care of Allen during his training years with General Cross, to ask her about his master's whereabouts. As they pass a funeral, a hoard of Akuma appear and attack the mourners. When a nurse who lost her husband becomes an Akuma, they suspect a possible conspiracy at a local hospital.
30	4	"The One Who Sells Souls, Part 2" (The Soul Sellers, Part Two); Transliteration: "Tamashii o Uru Mono – Kōhen" (Japanese: 魂を売る者•後編)	May 1, 2007
While Allen comforts their friend Liza as she mourns her sweetheart's death, Lenalee investigates the cause of why there is a large quantity of Akuma in the area. Lenalee suspects the work of a broker within the hospital who sells souls to the Millennium Earl, either the chief doctor, or a young money-hungry one. Working undercover as a nurse, Lenalee discovers that it is the chief doctor whom Mother promises to make see the error of his ways. Lenalee is called back to headquarters by her brother, while Allen is handed a pile of letters from General Cross which may lead to his whereabouts.
31	5	"Lost Miranda" (Miranda's Lost); Transliteration: "Maigo no Miranda" (Japanese: 迷子のミランダ)	May 8, 2007
While heading to Black Order Headquarters to become an Exorcist, Miranda Lotto gets separated from her Finder escort. She meets a nice family with a travelling magic show who takes her in. When Akuma discover her Innocence, they attack her and Officer Moore who came to her assistance. Lenalee arrives just in time to rescue them both. Miranda finally arrives at the headquarters, but is horrified when she realizes that Komui plans to cut her grandfather clock open to extract the fragment of Innocence.
32	6	"Mysterious Ghost Ship" (The Mysterious Ghost Ship); Transliteration: "Nazo no Yūreisen" (Japanese: なぞの幽霊船)	May 15, 2007
While waiting for a ship to rendezvous with Lenalee, Allen encounters a group of young wannabe pirates who claim that a pirate ship is sinking ships along the coast. They lead Allen to an Akuma ship which he destroys before continuing his journey.
33	7	"The Village Where a Witch Lives, Part 1" (The Village Where the Witch Lives, Part One); Transliteration: "Majo no Sumu Mura – Zenpen" (Japanese: 魔女の棲む村•前編)	May 22, 2007
While on his way to meet up with fellow Exorcist Daisya Barry in a village called Dan Kern, Kanda must pass through the infamous The Forest of No Return. In the forest he encounters an Akuma and the kind but cowardly Finder Goz, the only survivor of a group sent to investigate the village. They encounter a group of woodsmen who are also Akuma. Kanda destroys all but one who escapes. later. they meet a young girl Sophia and her father and stay with them, but Kanda is suspicious. Goz disappears in the night and Kanda follows his trail to a supposed witch's house
34	8	"The Village Where a Witch Lives, Part 2" (The Village Where the Witch Lives, Part Two); Transliteration: "Majo no Sumu Mura – Kōhen" (Japanese: 魔女の棲む村•後編)	May 29, 2007
Kanda finds Goz and Sophia's father in the supposed witch's house. On the way back to the village they encounter Sophia who explains that as long as there is a witch in the village, the people had someone to blame for problems. Her sickly sister Angela was chosen to replace the old woman who died. When Angela died, the Millennium Earl convinced Sophie to bring her back, and the sisters merged into one Akuma and turned the whole village into Akuma. The entire village of Akuma then attack Kanda, but he destroys them, leaving only Sophia, a Level 2 Akuma who he also kills. He leaves Goz and goes on to meet Exorcist Daisya Barry.
35	9	"Exorcist Clad in Wind" (The Wind-Clad Exorcist); Transliteration: "Kaze o Matō Ekusoshisuto" (Japanese: 風をまとうエクソシスト)	June 5, 2007
As she is on her way to reunite with Allen in Spain, Lenalee agrees to accompany Goz to the next town through the Black Forest, reportedly a place of wolf attacks. In the midst of the forest, they meet a group of forest settlers running away from their home because of wolf attacks. As a child is about to be attacked by wolves Exorcist Suman Dark appears and saves her, but refuses to help guard the settlers as it is not part of his orders. Just then they are attacked by a fast and powerful Level 2 Wolf Akuma but managed to defeat it and guide the settlers to the next town. Suman plans to on to guard General Winters Socalo, but agrees to escort the settlers back through the forest where they destroy the rest of the Wolf Akuma. The surly Suman surprisingly discovers some kindness within himself.
36	10	"Shroud of Darkness" (The Dark Curtain); Transliteration: "Yami no Tobari" (Japanese: 闇の帳)	June 12, 2007
Continuing their search for General Cross, Allen and Lenalee's train is attacked by hordes of Akuma led by a Level 2. They bump into a group of Finders who report many Akuma travelling west. Shortly thereafter the group of Finders are attacked by many of Akuma also led by a Level 2, but Allen and Lenalee return and manage to defeat them. Meanwhile the Millennium Earl announces to the Clan of Noah including Tyki, Skin and twins Jasdero and Devit that he plans to get rid of the Exorcists and gives them each a card with the names of people he'd like to be eliminated.
37	11	"Charity Bell" (The Neighborhood Boy ~Charity Bell~); Transliteration: "Rinjin no Kane ~Chariti Beru~" (Japanese: 隣人の鐘 〜チャリティベル〜)	June 19, 2007
As Kanda and Daisya head out to Barcelona to meet up with General Tiedoll, they are attacked by a hoard of Akuma. Afterwards Daisya reminisces about his past on how he became an Exorcist and how he met General Tiedoll when he was a young soccer-loving boy living in his poor family's souvenir shop.
38	12	"Froi Tiedoll"; Transliteration: "Furowa Tiedōru" (Japanese: フロワ•ティエドール)	June 26, 2007
A massive approaching legion of Akuma brings crisis in Barcelona which is thought to be the location of General Tiedoll. In fact, he is travelling with a family and sketching landscapes. The large groups of Finders prepare to protect the city as they wait for the Exorcists to arrive. Meanwhile Kanda and Daisya meet up with another fellow Exorcist, Noise Marie who detects at least 200 Akuma converging on Barcelona, and together they head towards the city. The Akuma attack Barcelona and the finders struggle to protect the city but the Akuma break through their defenses. Luckily, Kanda and the others arrive just in time. While the Exorcists are split up, Daisya meets Tyki and realizes Tyki is not human. Meanwhile, as news spreads about the Akuma, General Tiedoll heads towards the city, as do Allen and Lenalee.
39	13	"Silent Coffins" (Silent Casket); Transliteration: "Chinmoku no Hitsugi" (Japanese: 沈黙の棺)	July 3, 2007
Daisya attempts to fight Tyki, but is no match for the powerful Noah, thus leading to a tragic conclusion. General Tiedoll arrives on the outskirts and destroys the fleeing Akuma and then learns about Daisya's death from Kanda and Marie. He refuses to return to headquarters and vows to fight the war against the Akuma. Meanwhile, Allen and Lenalee arrive in Barcelona to find the bodies of Daisya and many dead Finders. Tyki gets himself lost, and encounters Suman Dark and his teammates in India. The tragedy of the war is escalating with 148 Black Order deaths including 6 Exorcists. Komui forbids the Finders from telling the deceased's families of the deaths to prevent the creation of more Akuma. Tiedoll and his Exorcists briefly meet Allen and Lenalee and tells them that Timcampy could be their guide to find Cross.
40	14	"Requiem Rose" (The Roses of Eternal Repose); Transliteration: "Chinkon no Bara" (Japanese: 鎮魂の薔薇)	July 10, 2007
Following Timcampy on the continued search for General Cross, Allen and Lenalee reunite with Lavi and Krory in the Bulgarian town of Rose Dorina which is celebrating the Rose Festival. Lavi tells them the total number of casualties in the war against the Millennium Earl, and how one of the Exorcists was killed by a Noah. Meanwhile, the Millennium Earl talks with Road about his concern with General Cross. During the night, Allen tells Lavi about the people he could and could not save, but with the help of Lavi, realizes the true reason why they fight. The next day as they prepare to leave, a beautiful blonde woman is seen watching them from a tower before she transforms into a black cat.
41	15	"A New Assassin"; Transliteration: "Arata Naru Shikyaku" (Japanese: 新たなる刺客)	July 17, 2007
Allen, Lenalee, Lavi, and Krory arrive at the Bosphorus Strait but a storm delays them from going further. A black cat leads them to an inn run by Lulu Bell, but during the night an Akuma attack prevents them from resting. Indeed, the cat is taking orders from the Millennium Earl. The cat is revealed as the Noah Lulu Bell, whose mission is to test Allen's Akuma-seeing eye and kill the Exorcists with the assistance of Mimi, her Level 2 Akuma servant. When Lulu Bell reveals herself, the rest of the Exorcists realize their trip is going to be more difficult than ever now that they have a new Noah to deal with.
42	16	"The Black Cat's Traps" (Trap of the Black Cat); Transliteration: "Kuroneko no Wana" (Japanese: 黒猫の罠)	July 24, 2007
The Exorcists explore the oriental world of Turkey. Lulu Bell initiates a devious trap to separate the Exorcists in an attempt to eliminate Allen and stop them from reuniting with General Cross. She seizes her chance when Krory gets himself lost, and impersonates Lenalee to lure him to the outskirts of town. Krory is nearly defeated by a Level 2 Akuma, but the other Exorcists arrive just in time. In the struggle, Lenalee and her impostor cannot be told apart, and both of them are captured by the Akuma who then take separate paths. Allen and Krory go after the spider-type Akuma and rescue one of the Lenalees while Lavi goes after the scorpion-type Akuma and destroys it. Lavi realizes that he has rescued the real Lenalee while Allen and Krory realize they have freed the fake Lenalee. She escapes, but when they give chase they find themselves lost.
43	17	"The Wandering Stone Statue" (The Wandering Statue); Transliteration: "Samayoeru Sekizō" (Japanese: さまよえる石像)	July 31, 2007
Separated from Lenalee and Lavi, Allen and Krory arrive in a town where a boy named Selim is accused of stealing a stone statue, the town symbol, which he says moved of its own accord. No-one is willing to believe him, except the mayor's daughter Katia. The villagers threaten to kill Selim, but Allen senses two Akuma and destroys them in front of the villagers. Afraid, the villagers chase the Exorcists back into the forest, as planned by Lulu Bell and Mimi. That night, Selim tells Allen and Krory how he witnessed the stone statue moving. Suspecting the presence of Innocence, the Exorcists decide to investigate. They see the stone statue moving into a ruined temple and follow it, becoming the targets of Mimi's Akuma. They are also attacked by a hoard of Akuma and by the statue activated by Lulu Bell. However as the Exorcists look like winning, Lulu Bell calls off the attack having effectively delayed their progress.
44	18	"Iron Fan Maid" (Maid Girl's Iron Fan); Transliteration: "Tessen no Jijo" (Japanese: 鉄扇の侍女)	August 7, 2007
Lavi races against time to try to make it to Bookman's location to cure Lenalee's illness, and in the canyons he saves a young maid from an Akuma. The maid is actually Mimi, who plots to steal Lavi's Innocence and kill them both. Luck does not seem to be on her side as Lavi always manages to directly or indirectly stop her from stealing his weapon. Lenalee's condition worsens, and she tells Lavi to leave her but he refuses. The situation stirs up memories in Mimi of her own creation, and she becomes more determined to finish the mission and see Lulu Bell smile. She finally manages to steal Lavi's Innocence and attempts to kill the two Exorcists with her iron fans, but Bookman's arrival turns the odds back on the Exorcists' side. A defeated Mimi returns to Lulu Bell, who decides not to dismiss her. That is all it takes for Mimi to smile once more.
45	19	"Strange Mansion" (Intriguing Mansion); Transliteration: "Kimyō na Yakata" (Japanese: 奇妙な館)	August 14, 2007
Kanda, Marie, and General Tiedoll arrive in Czechoslovakia where they meet a man named Klaus, who tells them the history of Jan Novak's famous mansion. The Exorcists soon discover a trio of Level 2 Akuma who lure them into Jan's mansion, and ultimately, a trap. The mansion is full of tricks and twists, along with hordes of Akuma. With Tiedoll curiously poking around and Klaus's interference, Kanda and Marie have their hands full just protecting them.
46	20	"Illusions in the Snow" (Illusion of Silver); Transliteration: "Shirogane no Gen'ei" (Japanese: 白銀の幻影)	August 21, 2007
Continuing east to China and to be reunited with Lenalee, Lavi, and Bookman, Allen and Krory must cross the Himalayan Mountains. They hire a young guide to take them through a "shortcut" in the mountains in spite of a pending snowstorm, watched by Mimi. When Krory injures his leg, they camp in an ice cave overnight. That night, both Krory and Allen see illusions of their loved and feared ones: Eliade and Arystar Senior for Krory, Mana and Cross for Allen. They are lured outside by the illusions and attacked by the Akuma of Lulu Bell and Mimi, but then are caught in an avalanche. Thanks to Timcanpy, the group finally reunites in Lhasa, but Lulu Bell has successfully delayed them, knowing that Cross has already left China.
47	21	"The Crystal Girl" (The Girl of the Crystal); Transliteration: "Suishō no Shōjo" (Japanese: 水晶の少女)	August 28, 2007
Allen, Krory, Lenalee, Lavi, and Bookman arrive in a town where a strange phenomenon is causing a water shortage. Krory, Lavi, and Bookman go to investigate the nearby lake, while Allen and Lenalee question the townspeople. Lenalee meets a young fortune-teller named Mei Lin and her grandfather who threw her crystal ball into the lake which may be a possible Innocence and the cause of the water shortage. As they talk, they are attacked by Akuma searching for the possible Innocence and Mei Lin is kidnapped by a dragon-type Akuma. Meanwhile at the lake Krory and Lavi find something under the water, but they are also attacked by Akuma.
48	22	"Wavering Accommodator" (The Reluctant Host); Transliteration: "Yureru Tekigōsha" (Japanese: 揺れる適合者)	September 4, 2007
Bookman suspects the crystal ball in the lake is an Innocence fragment. Mei Lin's grandfather tells how they threw her crystal ball into the lake after Mei Lin saw something terrifying in the future. Everyone converges on the lake where the dragon-type Akuma drops Mei Lin into the water. This activates the Innocence in the crystal ball, absorbing all of the water in the lake. Lenalee explains to Mei Lin that she is the host but Mei Lin refuses to accept it as the future she saw contained death and destruction around her. However, given a choice, Mei Lin finally accepts her destiny as an Exorcist and with Lenalee's help, Mei Lin merges with the Innocence. Watching from afar, Lulu Bell tells Mimi that she will report to the Millennium Earl their mission was a success, even though another Exorcist was created.
49	23	"Lulu Bell's Bell" (Madam Lulu Bell's Bell); Transliteration: "Ruru=Beru-sama" (Japanese: ルル=ベル様)	September 11, 2007
Annoyed that another Innocence has reached its compatible user, the Millennium Earl orders Lulu Bell to investigate its powers. Lulu Bell is disinterested in complying, and Mimi offers to do the job for her. When the bell falls from Lulu Bell's hair, she lets a very grateful Mimi keep it. Mei Lin's Innocence allows her to see the scouting Akuma, so Mimi decides to try stealing the Innocence. Things do not go as planned and she ends up in a fight with Lenalee. Mimi decides she will not retreat this time and finally reveals her Akuma form: a large dragon with the power of ferocious wind. While challenging, the Exorcists' combined efforts effectively defeat her, but Mei Lin sees a future vision of with them all hurt in a terrible battle. The Millennium Earl gives Lulu Bell more Akuma to destroy the Innocence. As Lulu Bell leaves, Mimi follows her, ignoring her injured state.
50	24	"Feelings of Devotion" (Earnest Feelings); Transliteration: "Ichizuna Omoi" (Japanese: 一途な想い)	September 18, 2007
Allen, Lenalee, Krory, Lavi, and Bookman accompany Mei Lin to meet her Finder at the Asian Headquarters, however, Lulu Bell and her hordes of Akuma are hot on their trail. Mei Lin's predictions help them fight the Akuma but the process exhausts her. The attackers force them to split into two groups, and Lulu Bell goes after Mei Lin. In the fierce battle, no-one gains the upper hand, then even though she is badly hurt, Mimi arrives to help Lulu Bell. This helps Lulu Bell retrieve the crystal ball and destroy the Innocence fragment, but at the cost of Mimi's life. When the Millennium Earl congratulates her and turns to leave, Lulu Bell does not follow him.
51	25	"Set Sail, to the East" (Set Sail From The Far East); Transliteration: "Shukkō, Higashi e" (Japanese: 出航、東へ)	September 25, 2007
Allen, Lenalee, Krory, Lavi, and Bookman arrive in Guangzhou, China. In a market, a cat grabs Timcanpy but they manage to retrieve him. They meet the beautiful Anita and her huge servant, Mahoja, who are supporters of the Black Order. Anita informs the Exorcists that General Cross had left China and was heading east to Edo, Japan when the ship was destroyed at sea by Akuma but it is unknown if he survived or not. Anita and Mahoja prepare a ship and crew to take the Exorcists to Edo. As they are about to depart they are attacked by a group of Akuma and the Exorcists impress the crew with their fighting abilities. As they set sail, the Millennium Earl sends a new wave of Akuma against Allen's group.

== Home media release ==
=== Japanese ===
Aniplex (Japan, Region 2)
Name	Date	Discs	Episodes
Volume 7	August 1, 2007	1	25–28
Volume 8	September 5, 2007	1	29–32
Volume 9	October 3, 2007	1	33–36
Volume 10	November 7, 2007	1	37–40
Volume 11	December 5, 2007	1	41–44
Volume 12	January 1, 2008	1	45–48
Volume 13	February 6, 2008	1	49–51

=== English ===
Funimation (North America, Region 1)
Name	Date	Discs	Episodes
Season Two, Part One	October 6, 2009	2	27–39
Season Two, Part Two	January 5, 2010	2	40–51

Manga Entertainment (United Kingdom, Region 2)
Name	Date	Discs	Episodes
Season Two, Part One	August 30, 2010	2	27–39
Season Two, Part Two	October 18, 2010	2	40–51

== See also ==
- List of D.Gray-man episodes
- List of D.Gray-man chapters
- List of D.Gray-man characters
