= D.Gray-man season 4 =

D.Gray-man
- Season 4
- The North American cover of the first DVD compilation released by Funimation of the fourth season, featuring Yu Kanda
- No. of episodes: 26

Release
- Original network: TV Tokyo
- Original release: April 8 – September 30, 2008

Season chronology
- ← Previous; Season 3 Next → D.Gray-man Hallow

The fourth season of the D.Gray-man anime series, called the "2nd stage", was directed by Osamu Nabeshima and produced by TMS Entertainment. It adapts Katsura Hoshino's manga. Like the rest of the series, it follows the adventures of Allen Walker, an Exorcist that wields the power of "Innocence" to fight against the Earl of Millennium, an ancient sorcerer seeking to destroy the world with monsters called akuma. In this season, Allen and his allies are trapped in a dimension known as Noah's Ark and must fight the Earl's underlings in order to find a way home.

The season initially ran from October 2, 2007, to September 30, 2008, on TV Tokyo in Japan. Thirteen DVD compilations of the second season, each containing four episodes were released by Aniplex between March 5, 2008, and March 4, 2009. In June 2016, the series was licensed by Funimation for an English-language release in North America. In August 2017, Funimation announced they would release the series' second half on home media version starting on October of the same year.

Three pieces of theme music are used for the series: one opening theme and two ending themes. The opening theme is Uverworld's "Gekidō" (激動). The two closing themes Mai Hoshimura's "Regret" for episodes 77 to 89, and Stephanie's "Changin'" for the rest of the season.

== Episode list ==
No. overall	No. in season	English title / Original Japanese title	Original release date
78	1	"Forbidden Skill, Sangen Style" (Taboo, Three Illusions); Transliteration: "Kinki, Sangenshiki" (Japanese: 禁忌､三幻式)	April 8, 2008
Kanda, superior in speed, and Skin, superior in power, fight to an apparent stalemate. Skin reflects on his past while barraging Kanda with blasts of lightning; Kanda responds by using his Nigentou. Kanda then activates his Kinki Sangenshiki (Taboo Three Illusions). The room shakes, signaling that it will soon collapse. As Kanda uses his first move, Eight Flowers Praying Mantis and then second move Sublimate his life force is partially drained by his Nigentou. Kanda remembers Komui telling him that the duration of his life, is like a lotus blossom that as it loses petals, it symbolizes the amount of time that he has left. Suddenly Skin's dark energy chains materialize, connecting Kanda to Skin. Skin uses these to throw Kanda around, telling him that the Noah can never die. Kanda endures as he is still protected by Miranda's Time Record Innocence and unleashes a final attack. As Skin falls, Kanda tells him that anyone can die as long as they remain mortal. Sure of his victory, Kanda heads for the exit as Skin slowly reawakens saying that Noah are immortal.
79	2	"Noah's Memory"; Transliteration: "Noazu Memorī" (Japanese: ノアズ メモリー)	April 15, 2008
Believing he defeated Skin, Kanda walks to the exit of the room, but the numbness in his left hand and knees hinder him, and much of his life was consumed in the battle with Skin. Skin's eyes start to bleed and he recalls three years ago, a stigmata in the shape of a row of crosses on his forehead appeared and he went to see a priest who told him about Noahs. He then killed everyone there, turning them into Akuma. It was then that the Earl appeared to him and explained his history and his purpose - to kill humans and never forgive god for creating him. Remembering the pain that the Innocence caused his ancestors, the Noah revives to fight Kanda once more. Draining more of his life, Kanda restores Mugen momentarily and destroys Skin, but the exit crumbles before he can leave. As the room crumbles, Kanda thinks of his comrades and of the lotus blossom, representing the remainder of his life, wilting, and he smiles before he disappears. The room then completely collapses. In Edo, Miranda notices that someone's time has vanished.
80	3	"The Twins' Trap" (Twins' Trap); Transliteration: "Tsuinzu Torappu" (Japanese: ツインズ･トラップ)	April 22, 2008
As Skin Boric dies, the other Noah involuntarily begin to cry. Allen's group continue looking for an exit with Lero. The Noah hold a wake for Skin. They then find out that General Cross had escaped from the Noah twins, Jasdero and Devito, once again, leaving them with a list of his debts. Road notices that Allen's name is also on the bills. While the group continues walking down the corridor, the twins set several traps which involve booby-trapped liquor bottles and gambling. Allen manages to beat these challenges through his knowledge of past experiences with General Cross. Eventually, they come face to face with Jasdero and Devito. The confrontation begins with the twins using their guns to fire Cross' rolled-up bills at Allen, before firing a special freeze bullet.
81	4	"Debt Crisis"; Transliteration: "Shakkin Kuraishisu" (Japanese: 借金クライシス)	April 29, 2008
The twins, Jasdero and Devito fire several kinds of bullets at Allen: blue (freeze beam), red (ball of fire) and white (neutralizer), however the guns and bullets are just the vehicles of their power. The twins want Allen to pay the debts General Cross tricked them into paying before he disappeared from Edo, but which Allen claims that they are nothing compared to those that left to him. The battle between the Noah and Exorcists begins in earnest. The twins fire a purple bullet which covers the eyes of the Exorcists with a purple mask called Deceiving Spectacles which manipulates their vision and Allen loses Road's key in a sea of illusionary copies summoned by the Twins' ability.
82	5	"Bad Game"; Transliteration: "Baddo Gēmu" (Japanese: バッドゲーム)	May 6, 2008
With their eyes covered by purple masks which manipulate their vision Jasdero and Devito are longer visible to the Exorcist group, and they cannot find the key. Allen tries to force them out of hiding, but the twins fire a green bullet, enclosing Allen in a green airless jelly-like blob. Lavi releases Allen and reveals that he is Bookman's successor and can identify the original key. As Lavi searches for the key, Krory says that he can detect the twins, and directs Allen into successfully catching them. To get out of their hold, the twins release a mud-monster called Jasdevi's Hatred on Allen and Krory, devouring them whole. The twins then take Lenalee as a shield, angering Allen, who breaks free, only to be kept busy by an illusionary Earl with all the strength of the real one. Lero reveals that the twins' ability is Materialization, where when they are thinking the same thing, they can make it real. When Lavi finds the key and opens the exit door, the masks and illusions disappear and the twins are visible once again. Angry at being called 'kids' and annoyances, they merge and reveal their true form, Jasdevi, "the strongest body ever imagined ".
83	6	"Jasdevi Enters the Scene" (Jasdevi, Enters); Transliteration: "Jasudebi, Tōjō" (Japanese: ジャスデビ、登場)	May 13, 2008
In their combined form of Jasdevi, Jasdero and Devito become exponentially stronger. Jasdevi angers Krory by casually calling him a vampire and a monster. Krory challenges Jasdevi one-on-one to allow the others time to escape. When Krory drinks one of his three bottles of Chomesuke's blood, he is able to fight almost on par with Jasdevi. Fueled by his anger and memory of his lost love Eliade, Krory drinks a second bottle of blood, but the fight has left him too weak to break down the Akuma virus within his blood. He grows weaker, but tries to avoid drinking the last bottle, but when he decides that he must drink it Jasdevi takes it from him and drinks it himself. With Krory greatly weakened, Jasdevi is able to enclose him inside an iron maiden.
84	7	"Bloody Krory"; Transliteration: "Buraddi Kurōrī" (Japanese: ブラッディ•クロウリー)	May 20, 2008
After Krory's defeat, Jasdevi follows Allen and the others. Meanwhile, the dying Krory encounters his lost love, Eliade, who tells him that by dying, he'll lose those humans who considered him a friend. More determined than ever, Krory's blood leaves his body and attacks Jasdevi in a form created by his Innocence called Bloody Krory. This considerably weakens Jasdevi and after one final clash, Jasdevi separates back into Jasdero and Devito, causing them to stop and rest, ultimately falling through the door and disappearing. The iron maiden falls open and Krory and his Innocence rejoin as the room collapses. Allen and the others continue their walk through the Ark and come to the final room, at the top of the tower, where Road and Tyki await. Upon entering the room, Allen is tackled by Road Camelot who kisses him and then they discover that the tower is the only building left intact in the Ark.
85	8	"Dark-Colored Rhapsody"; Transliteration: "Yamiiro Rapusodī" (Japanese: 闇色ラプソディー)	May 27, 2008
With only the tower left standing on the Ark, the group is now trapped inside with two Noahs. Lenalee and Lavi are shocked to learn that Allen's Innocence has literally become part of his heart. This leads Lavi to speculate Allen, in addition to Lenalee, may be the heart. Soon after, Allen and Tyki face off once again. Meanwhile, Road traps Lenalee and Chaoji and sends Lavi's mind and spirit to another dimension, where he has to confront himself. Road promises that if he survives, she will release his trapped comrades.
86	9	"Weak Humans" (The Weak Person); Transliteration: "Yowaki Hito" (Japanese: ヨワキ ヒト)	June 3, 2008
Allen's battle with Tyki Mikk and Lavi's struggle within Road's dream continue. Tyki is determined to crush Allen's Innocence once again, but Allen remembers Komui saying that while Innocence is the weakness of Noah, Innocence is vulnerable to the Noah. Tyki attacks Allen with absolute power, severely damaging Allen, but his Innocence heals him. Tyki uses his ability to create a vacuum in the atmosphere around Allen, suffocating him. As Tyki enters the vacuum to finish off Allen, he finds that Allen is still conscious. Allen attempts to activate his Innocence with stronger synchronization and power, but Tyki drives his hand into Allen's heart. And as Tyki is about to crush it, Allen's body begins to glow. Meanwhile in the HQ, Hevlaska is experiencing pain and chanting that a new General is coming. Komui and Reever both suggest that it is Allen. Back at the Ark, Allen pushes Tyki away and his forearm is transformed into a sword handle. As he pulls it out, he mentions that the critical point has been broken. The episode ends with Tyki shocked and Allen wielding the sword, with his left arm gone.
87	10	"Transcendent One" (Critical Point); Transliteration: "Rinkaisha" (Japanese: 臨界者)	June 10, 2008
Using his new sword, which resembles the Earl's, Allen intimidates the Noah and escapes from Tyki's vacuum. Lenalee and Chaoji attempt to escape Road's cell, but hurt themselves in the process. Meanwhile, Tyki defends against Allen's Innocence and remembers events from his "white" side and his "black" side. Allen finally breaks through the defenses and cuts Tyki. Thinking he should be dead, Tyki and the others are confused to see he has suffered no apparent damage and yet he feels pain. Allen reveals his purpose is to kill the Noah, but save the human, or "white" side of Tyki Mikk while Tyki feels the pain of the Noah inside him dying. As Road watches in horror, Allen exorcises the Noah from Tyki and the Noah's gray skin and forehead stigmata fade away. After watching her family member exorcised, she stabs Chaoji with her candles and threatens the others in revenge. She prepares to destroy Lavi's mind which is trapped within her dream world. She creates the illusion that his "dead" allies have come back to life and attack him and Lavi realizes that he must fight his way through them to survive.
88	11	"Lavi"; Transliteration: "Rabi" (Japanese: ラビ)	June 17, 2008
In Road's dream world, Lavi cuts down his comrades as he tries to ignore their pleas. While he debates his responsibilities as a bookman and his other self he defeated by his illusionary friends and lapse into unconsciousness. Road reveals Lavi was never injured, but went into shock because he believed his friends stabbed him. She releases Lavi, now controlled by his bookman heart, and orders Allen to kill him, otherwise Lenalee and Chaoji will die by her candles. Under Road's control Lavi attacks Allen who refuses to fight back and instead, stabs Road, but she is uninjured as it is not her true from. Allen is engulfed in Lavi's Fire Seal flames, but realizes that the heat is not affecting him. The candles surrounding Lenalee and Chaoji begin to melt instead. Lavi regains control of his body and engulfs Road in flame. She still seems uninjured until a blade pierces her body. Back in Road's dream world, Lavi realized that Allen was the true Road. He succeeds in damaging her but he then starts to fade away.
89	12	"Voice of Darkness" (The Voice of Darkness); Transliteration: "Yami no Koe" (Japanese: 闇の声)	June 24, 2008
In Road's dream world, Lavi continues to debate with himself about his conflicting roles as an Exorcist and a future Bookman. Back in the tower, Lavi is engulf in his own flames, and screaming Lavi's name, Allen manages to save him and the Fire Seal turns into stone. Road breaks out of the stone but is unable to move. Lenalee believes that Allen and Lavi are gone, but they also emerge from a pile of stone. With Allen transformed back to his normal form, his left arm has reappeared. Road starts to laugh hysterically until she bursts into smoke. They head for the exit at the top of the tower, but when they arrive, Allen decides to stay and save Tyki. Suddenly Allen is entangled by a tentacled beast and is pulled down to the floor below. After the dust clears, Allen sees the exit door broken and he watches as Tyki painfully transforms into something terrifying.
90	13	"Black Carnival"; Transliteration: "Burakku Kānibaru" (Japanese: ブラックカーニバル)	July 1, 2008
Possessing tremendous power and speed, the transformed Tyki is too fast and too powerful for Allen and Lavi who followed to help him. With the door destroyed, there is little hope of finding a way out of the Ark. Despite this, the Exorcists continue to fight back. Tyki grabs Lenalee, but the tower crumbles around them. Chaoji reacts to an Innocence sent by General Tiedoll, lifting the rubble saving his and Lenalee's life temporarily. The fight with Tyki continues, as Allen vows to fight until his life ends. Meanwhile, a group of Skulls, strange beings with skull-like heads, guard the Akuma Egg, giant blue, translucent, egg-shaped orb used to manufacture Akuma. Then, one of their own arrives and defeats them.
91	14	"Judgment"; Transliteration: "Jajjimento" (Japanese: ジャッジメント)	July 8, 2008
Tyki is gaining momentum while Allen and Lavi are weakening. Meanwhile the rogue Skull approaches the glowing orb and throws one of his own kind into it and reveals that he has been taught by a disciple of the ancient magical arts. Back at the Ark, the battle rages on. A hole opens up under Allen and he falls through, but is he is saved by the rogue Skull who Allen recognizes as his master, General Cross Marian accompanied by Timcanpy. After berating Allen and Lavi for being disheveled, Cross prepares the Grave of Maria and the Magdala Curtain. Tyki is confused and attacks, but Cross counter-attacks with his Judgment bullets and other anti-Akuma weapons. Allen and Lavi realize how much more powerful Cross is than themselves. Just as Cross is landing the final blow, the Millennium Earl interrupts, taking Tyki. More of the Ark crumbles with Lavi and Chaoji falling into the abyss. The Earl and Cross face each other.
92	15	"Shadow of the Player" (Shadow of the Musician); Transliteration: "Sōsha no Kage" (Japanese: 奏者の影)	July 15, 2008
The Earl and General Cross share a brief conversation, and when the Earl mentions all of the Exorcists who "disappeared", Allen becomes enraged and attempts to fight the Earl, despite the fact that he is seriously wounded. The Earl comments that Allen's new Innocence is just like his own sword, but after trading a few blows with Allen, he decides to take the unconscious Tyki and escape the crumbling Ark. The General then takes both Allen and Lenalee to the location of the Akuma Egg, and orders Allen to control the Ark. He sends Allen and Timcampy into the "secret room" of the 14th Noah, where Allen faces a dark apparition in the mirror who calls Timcampy "My Timcampy." Cross tells Allen to play on the white piano in the room, using a mysterious set of symbols projected by Timcampy as the music. Elsewhere the Earl is seen playing a piano in his black Ark with Road, Lero and Lulu Bell, seemingly affected by the reappearance of the 14th Noah. Meanwhile as Allen plays the white piano, the Ark begins to reform itself, reversing its destruction and reviving the Exorcists who perished within it.
93	16	"Melody"; Transliteration: "Senritsu" (Japanese: 旋律)	July 22, 2008
Allen manages to repair the Ark, so that it is reconstructed with all the Exorcists who perished within it coming back to life and reunited. However the Noah are nowhere to be seen. Also, the Akuma Egg "factory" was only half downloaded due to General Cross's spell, so it can not function and will not be delivered to the Earl. When Allen and the Exorcists accidentally fall through a bottomless door, Chaoji regains his Innocence in the form of two interlocked bracelets attached to his left hand and saves them. They suddenly realize that General Cross, who is a womanizer, is alone with Lenalee and the unconscious Krory. They hurry back only to discover the General and Lenalee appear to be in a passionate embrace.
94	17	"Homecoming"; Transliteration: "Kikyō" (Japanese: 帰郷)	July 29, 2008
Allen and all of his comrades catch up with the Exorcists in Edo and return safely to the HQ with the Ark to a huge welcome. Miranda deactivates her Innocence, making the injuries the Noah inflicted on the Exorcists to reappear. While the Exorcists recover in the hospital of HQ, Bak and other scientists study the Ark's ability to teleport people anywhere in the world. Allen goes into the piano room with Tim and ponders on how the symbols he and Mana created years ago were the song to move the Ark. Elsewhere, the Earl becomes enraged by the fact that the 14th Noah has somehow helped the Exorcists obtain the Ark and the Akuma Egg.
95	18	"Lamb and Dog" (Sheep and Dog); Transliteration: "Hitsuji to Inu" (Japanese: 羊と犬)	August 5, 2008
Special Inspector, Malcolm C. Rouvelier convenes an inquest with Komui, Bak, other Branch heads and the four Generals. Rouvelier and his assistant, Howard Link outline all the events that started in Edo, and propose severe punishment for Cross because of his unorthodox handling of his mission to eliminate the Akuma factory, including being out of communication for four years. Because of his success he is forgiven, but Komui and the Exorcists realize that they are only pawns in the war between the Black Order and the Earl. Rouvelier also proposes putting Allen on trial for heresy, because he and Cross clearly have ties with the enemy, and Allen appears to be the successor left by the 14th Noah. Cross is alarmed that Rouvelier knew about the 14th, but is confident that nothing would be turned up in an investigation. Rouvelier orders that Cross is to remain at headquarters and that Howard Link will be assigned to supervise Allen's every movement.
96	19	"Still the Clock Ticks" (Yet the Hands of Time Move Onward); Transliteration: "Daga Susumu Koku no Hari" (Japanese: だが進む刻の針)	August 12, 2008
Howard Link greets Allen in the cafeteria, while notifying him that he will be under surveillance. After overhearing this, Lenalee goes to talk to her brother to understand why, and finds him with Inspector Malcolm C. Rouvelier, the man who traumatized her in the past. He informs her that she will also be under observation. Howard tells Allen learns that he is suspected of being related to the 14th Noah and he is banned from having contact with Cross. The Inspector tells Komui that the will of the 14th is continued by multiple people, including General Cross. As Howard follows him, Allen sees the shadowy smiling figure from the piano room again. Later, Allen discovers that the science department of the Order removed the Akuma Egg from the Ark to study it. Hevlaska temporarily removes Lenalee's Innocence for observation because it's so weak. The Black Order branch heads offer to help with the study of the Egg, but they are rejected by Johnny Gill, a science department junior. He is suddenly stabbed by Branch Head of Oceania, Andrew Nansen who is the Noah Lulu Bell in disguise and then hundreds of Akuma appear behind her.
97	20	"Attack on Headquarters" (Headquarters Under Siege); Transliteration: "Honbu Shūgeki" (Japanese: 本部襲撃)	August 19, 2008
The Noah Lulu Bell leads her army of Akuma to attack the Lab 5 of the Headquarters, where the Akuma Egg is being studied. The army injures almost the entire science department, preparing to turn them into Skulls; Tapp is the first to be transformed. Allen and Bookman arrive through the Ark just as Reever is about to be the second. Lulu Bell orders the Akuma to hold off the Exorcists until she has retrieved the Egg, throwing Allen immediately into battle. Lenalee and Lavi attempt to reach Allen, but they are stopped by Komui and locked into the infirmary. Lenlee begs Komui to let her go so she can see Hevlaska and re-synchronize with her Innocence. But Komui refuses, saying he cannot lose her. Meanwhile, Allen and Bookman still struggle with the endless army of level 3 Akuma. Lulu Bell opens up a gate, and prepares the Egg for retrieval.
98	21	"The Power of Generals" (The Power of a General); Transliteration: "Gensui no Chikara" (Japanese: 元帥の力)	August 26, 2008
Allen and Bookman are still fighting the Akuma, but Lulu Bell has already secured the Akuma Egg and opened a gate to the Millennium Earl. With nobody to help them, Allen and Bookman struggle to keep up against the hordes of Akuma. Some of the researchers are transformed into Skulls as Bak and the rest of the survivors attempt to make a protective Talisman. Outside, Komui arrives and Rouvelier criticizes him for being slow and suggesting the worst-case scenario. Inside Lab 5, with Bookman defeated and Allen captured, the scientists succeed in making a talisman to save Allen. At that moment, Miranda Lotto, Noise Marie, and the Generals arrive just as the Egg is being transferred and Allen is kidnapped. The assembled Akuma transform into a group of giant Combined Akuma, but the Generals take them down with surprising efficiency.
99	22	"The Noah of Lust"; Transliteration: "Shiki no Noa" (Japanese: 色のノア)	September 2, 2008
The Exorcists emerge victorious although many of the staff are dead or dying. Meanwhile the destroyed Akuma start to release poisonous gas. Komui orders the Egg destroyed but Rouvelier wants it kept. Lulu Bell comes back transformed into a liquid form and forces Miranda to stop her time activation so time begins to flow again. Meanwhile, Johnny goes looking for Tapp, who is already a Skull. Tapp does not recognize Johnny and tosses him aside. Johnny is then swallowed up by part of the only remaining Combined Akuma. Lulu Bell captures the Egg and the Generals are unable to stop her or damage the dark matter Egg. With Miranda trapped inside her liquid form Lulu Bell prepares to escape with the Egg. The Generals use their Anti-Akuma weapons against Lulu Bell, despite Miranda being inside her. Suddenly the Egg begins to crumble and break apart and Allen emerges. He recovers Miranda but his Akuma-seeing eye detects something and he hears some ominous childish laughing.
100	23	"Level 4"; Transliteration: "Reberu 4" (Japanese: レベル4)	September 9, 2008
A new Akuma emerges from the remaining Combined Akuma, appearing as a pale pregnant woman with the number 4 on her belly. The Akuma evolves and again tries to absorb Johnny, but the scientists manage to retrieve him and stop the Skulls from taking Bak. The Akuma then attacks the scientists with its tentacles. It appears to die, but gives birth to a Level 4 Akuma, in humanoid form with wings. Allen is stunned at the sight of the Level 4's soul and comments on its terrible state. Seeing his comrades injured, Allen attacks the Level 4 but is unable to harm it and is easily blasted away by a beam. The Level 4 screams loudly, causing Allen to lose synchronization and unable to move. Then, the Level 4 destroys the floor of Lab 5 causing the floor to change into a fiery pit. Fortunately, the people are transported to a safety by General Cross' Maria's Carte Guarde. The Skulls ask to be released from the Talisman, but the Level 4 heartlessly fires at them and looks for humans to kill. It removes the barrier to the lab and enters the headquarters to resume its annihilation. Allen loses consciousness with Howard by his side.
101	24	"To the God I Hate So Much" (To the God I Hate); Transliteration: "Daikirai na Kami-sama e" (Japanese: だいきらいな かみさまへ)	September 16, 2008
The Level 4 Akuma starts its attack in Central Headquarters. It is about to target Komui as the supervisor but is deflected by a blow from Kanda although his sword breaks. The Finders trap the Akuma in a shield using many talisman together and Hevlaska contacts Komui to take the Innocence from her body and out of headquarters to safety using the Ark. Rouvelier wants the Innocence be used to fight the Akuma but Komui orders everyone to the Asian branch for evacuation. However Rouvelier insists Lenalee synchronize with her Innocence to fight the Akuma, saying that it's her choice, and they head towards Hevlaska with Lavi. When Komui and Kanda go down the elevator to intercept them, the Level 4 attacks them. As Hevlaska tries to force the Innocence into Lenalee's body, the Level 4 suddenly attacks Hevlaska, leaving her seriously injured. Lenalee tries to reach her Innocence but the Level 4 steps on her head and she is unable to move.
102	25	"The Promise" (Exchange of Promises); Transliteration: "Yakusoku no Kotoba" (Japanese: 約束のコトバ)	September 23, 2008
Trapped by the Level 4 Akuma, Lenalee recalls her life before the Innocence forced her to live at the Black Tower. Just then, Allen attacks the Akuma from above, using his Innocence to move his badly injured body. This gives Lenalee the chance to reach her Innocence. On seeing Lenalee struggle, Komui recalls how he joined the Black Order to be with her. Lenalee's Innocence turns to a liquid and she drinks it, but then blood pours out of her legs. Allen continues to distract the Akuma with Kanda and Lavi's help. Meanwhile, the Innocence uses Lenalee's blood to materialize into new boots, avoiding the need to become parasitic. She then attacks the Akuma, joining forces with Allen which intensifies their efforts and they end up pushing Allen's sword through the Akuma.
103	26	"Echoes in the Long Morning" (It Echoes in the Long Morning); Transliteration: "Nagai Asa ni Hibiku" (Japanese: 長い朝に響く)	September 30, 2008
The Level 4 Akuma appears to be defeated so Komui cancels the evacuation. Suddenly the Akuma moves and attacks Allen and the battle is renewed, however, now with the help of the Generals, the Level 4 is finally destroyed. In the aftermath of the battle, rescue teams are dispatched to gather the survivors and they learn that many were protected by Miranda's Time Out and the Generals, but Johnny cries bitterly as Tapp dies and turns to sand. Cross is sent to the Central Office for debriefing while everyone prepares for the relocation of the Black Order's Headquarters. Krory regains consciousness, much to the joy of his friends. As the Exorcists ponder the significance of Lenalee's evolved "Equip Type" Innocence into the "Crystal Type", Allen declares that they must become stronger in order to defeat the Earl. Bookman wonders what the Earl's real end game is. The scene changes to show that the Noahs are attending a ball. The Earl is shown in the shadows with a humanoid shape, saying that he is making a new Akuma Egg and ponders why he did not kill Allen when Mana died. The end credits show the Exorcists fully recovered and continuing their duties, reunited with their Innocences and sporting new outfits. The post-credits reveal the Earl buying flowers from a poor girl. Allen vows to destroy the Earl.

== Home media release ==
=== Japanese ===
Aniplex (Japan, Region 2)
Name	Date	Discs	Episodes
Volume 7	September 3, 2008	1	76–79
Volume 8	October 1, 2008	1	80–83
Volume 9	November 5, 2008	1	84–87
Volume 10	December 3, 2008	1	88–91
Volume 11	January 7, 2009	1	92–95
Volume 12	February 4, 2009	1	96–99
Volume 13	March 4, 2009	1	100–103

=== English ===
Funimation (North America, Region 1)
Name	Date	Discs	Episodes
Season Four, Part One	March 13, 2018	3	78–90
Season Four, Part Two	June 12, 2018	3	91–103

== See also ==
- List of D.Gray-man episodes
- List of D.Gray-man chapters
- List of D.Gray-man characters
