= The Black Order =

The Black Order or Black Order may refer to:

- Ordine Nero, an Italian far-right organization
- "The Black Order" (D.Gray-man episode), a 2006 episode of the D.Gray-man
- The Black Order (2006 novel), a 2006 SIGMA Force book by James Rollins
- The Black Order Brigade, a 1979 political thriller graphic novel
- Black Order (comics), a supervillain team from Marvel Comics
- "The Black Order", part III of "The Mystic Prophecy of the Demonknight" on Triumph or Agony, a 2006 album by Rhapsody of Fire
- Black Order (Satanist group), a satanist organization founded in New Zealand
