= Chinmoku =

Chinmoku is the original title of:

- Silence (Endō novel), 1966 novel of historical fiction by Japanese author Shūsaku Endō
- Silence (1971 film), Japanese drama film directed by Masahiro Shinoda, based on the novel
- An opera by Teizo Matsumura, based on the novel
- "The Silence", a short story by Haruki Murakami, published in the 1991 collection The Elephant Vanishes
- "Silence", a 2007 episode of Death Note
- "Silence", a 2008 episode of D.Gray-man
