= Lenalee Lee =

Fictional character from D.Gray-man

- D.Gray-man character
- Lenalee Lee as drawn by Katsura Hoshino
- First appearance: D.Gray-man manga chapter 6 (2004)
- Created by: Katsura Hoshino
- Voiced by: Japanese; Shizuka Itō; Ai Kakuma (Hallow); English; Luci Christian
- Notable relatives: Komui Lee (brother)

Lenalee Lee (Japanese: リナリー・リー, Hepburn: Rinarī Rī) is a fictional character in the manga series D.Gray-man, created by Japanese writer and artist Katsura Hoshino. Within the series, set in a fictional 19th century, Lenalee is an exorcist of the Black Order organization tasked with destroying demonic beings called Akuma created by the Millennium Earl, and aiding the Black Order in its fight against the Earl's group, the Noah Family. To facilitate this, she uses a type of weapon called "Innocence" that, in her case, takes the shape of a pair of boots. Lenalee was originally forced to become an exorcist when she was a child, but ended up appreciating it after her older brother, Komui Lee, moved to the Black Order to avoid being left, alone and at the same time became friends with all the staff. Lenalee has also appeared in the series' light novels and video games as well.

Lenalee was one of the first characters Hoshino created for the manga, most notably before the series' protagonist, Allen Walker. She originated in Hoshino's one shot, Zone, where she is depicted as a teenager who wants the Earl to revive her boyfriend. Hoshino's design changes across the D.Gray-man series led to arguments between Hoshino and her editor who argued how Lenalee's hairstyle should look.

Lenalee has been well received by the series' readers. She has kept fourth place in every character popularity poll of the series, and has also appeared in polls to decide the most popular manga characters in Japan. Reviewers have praised Lenalee's easygoing character, as well as her role in the story. Merchandising based on her has also been released.

== Creation and design ==
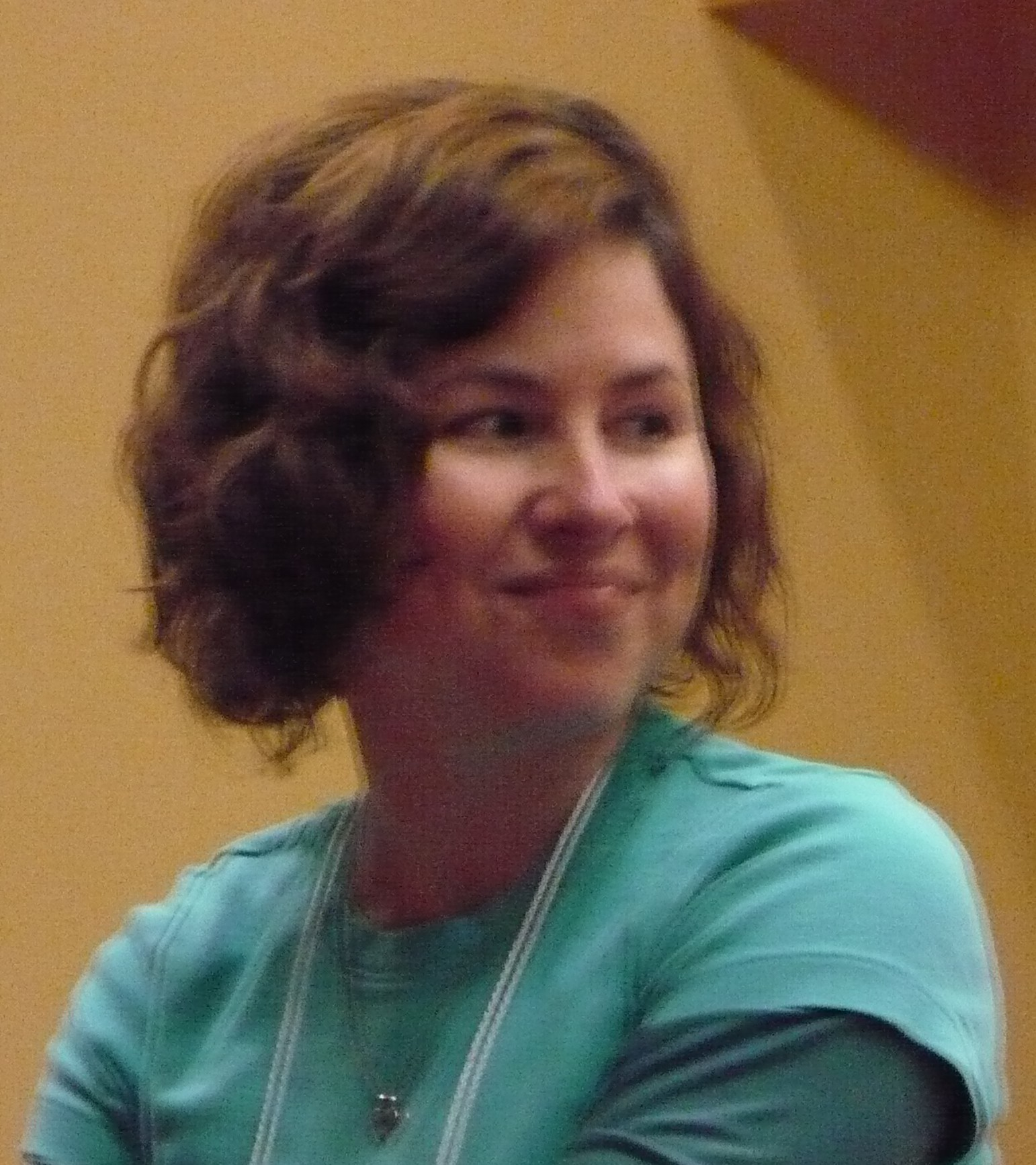
Luci Christian voices Lenalee in the anime's English dub.

Katsura Hoshino's one shot Zone featured many characters similar to those that would appear in D.Gray-man, especially Lenalee, the Millennium Earl, and General Cross Marian. Many other characters are also "leftovers" from earlier, sometimes unpublished works.^{[vol. 8:40]} Lenalee was one of the first characters created for the series, most notably, before Allen Walker. Hoshino based Lenalee on a real person, but has only shared her identity with her editor who laughed at the revelation. Hoshino considers her to be an ideal girl.^{[vol. 1:172]} Her exorcist uniform was remade many times until the author was satisfied with it.^{[vol. 1:172]} Lenalee was originally going to be portrayed as crabby and fiery based on her dark backstory, but ended up as a nice girl.

Hoshino thought that in a Victorian setting, long-haired girls tended to become the central character. After considering this, she believed a short-haired girl would stand out more and be much cuter. However, her editor wanted the character to have long hair, believing this would be better received by readers. As a result, Lenalee has long hair in the early chapters of the manga. Nevertheless, Hoshino took advantage of Lenalee's fight against the Level 3 Akuma to generate an impact strong enough to cause her to lose some of her hair in the process. Hoshino paid the most attention to Lenalee's uniform wanting to design clothing that would be sexually appealing. As a result, her uniform included a mini-skirt. However, Hoshino notes that the design does not fit with the manga's setting and states that it is best to treat Lenalee's uniform as fan service.

Hoshino enjoyed drawing Lenalee's hair, despite finding her D.Gray-man character Yu Kanda's hair impossible to top. She enjoyed drawing Lenalee because of her personality, and her relationship with other series' characters such as Komui and Reever Wenhamm. Because her hair grew longer as the series went on, the author gave her different hairstyles. When the manga moved to Jump Square, a magazine for older readers, Hoshino decided to increase Lenalee's sex appeal by having her skirt shorter even though she is also wearing shorts beneath it. After Allen Walker became a fugitive from the Order, Hoshino wanted to have Lenalee chase after him, to the point where they would clash. When asked about Allen's farewell hug with Lenalee as he leaves the Order, Hoshino joked that she was happy with how Lenalee had matured, and at the same time become taller than Allen, in contrast to the beginning of the series when they were both the same height.

Lenalee is voiced by Shizuka Itō in the original Japanese animated adaptation of the manga. Ito found Lenalee striking both in terms of personality and design and thus wanted to properly voice the character when receiving the news she was being cast. Hoshino joked that Lenalee seemed more beautiful after she saw Itō's work.^{[vol. 9:187]} Itō was replaced by Ai Kakuma in the Japanese anime sequel D.Gray-man Hallow. Lenalee is voiced in English by Luci Christian. Christian has stated she liked the character and was happy that Funimation intended to release the series' second half in 2017 so that she could voice her again.

== Appearances ==
=== In D.Gray-man ===
Lenalee first appears in chapter 5 of D.Gray-man and is properly introduced in the 6th chapter when she shows exorcist newcomer Allen Walker the Black Order.^{[ch. 6]} While on a mission to slay Akumas with Allen, Lenalee explains her past. Her parents were killed by an Akuma when she was very young, and she was forced to become an Exorcist as a child. Because she was separated from her brother, Komui Lee, her only remaining family member, she tried repeatedly to escape but was restrained. As a result, she hated the Order and Innocence. When Komui joined the Order to be with her, she stopped trying to escape. She now fights for her brother as well as her friends, knowing she has a home and family to return to.^{[ch. 21]} Her perception of the "world" consists of her friends and family; whenever one of her friends dies, it seems to her as if a part of her world has been destroyed.^{[ch. 69]} Lenalee's Innocence are the Dark Boots (黒い靴, Dāku Būtsu), her Equipment-type anti-Akuma weapon, take the form of a pair of black, knee-high boots that give her the ability to run at high speeds, jump to great heights, walk on water, create whirlwinds and use sound waves as footholds.^{[ch. 18,48,67]}

When the exorcists are given the mission to save General Cross Marian from the Noah clan, she believes Allen was killed on the journey by her former ally Suman Dark.^{[ch. 48,57]} As she copes with this, Lenalee defeats a Level 3 Akuma attacking her group's ship. She then coaxes more power from her Innocence than she can safely handle, reducing her ability to use her boots as well as her physical mobility. During this state, her Innocence becomes a crystal to protect her from harm, a behavior unheard of in Innocence.^{[ch. 71]} This leads the Millennium Earl to believe that Lenalee might possess the "Great Heart" that both exorcists and the Noah search for as the user of it will win the war. However, the Earl tries to take her, but the exorcist is saved by the returning Allen.^{[ch. 88]} The group is then trapped in Noah's Ark where their enemies try to kill the exorcist before the Ark is destroyed.^{[ch. 89]} With Cross' help, Allen saves the Ark.^{[ch. 133]} After returning to the Black Order, a Level 4 Akuma attacks the HQ, and many people are injured or killed. Lenalee willingly expresses a desire to become an exorcist.^{[ch. 160]} Accepting her conviction, the Innocence grants her greater power, becoming a never-before-seen evolved Equipment-type, dubbed a Crystal-type. These new Boots are made up of Lenalee's blood and repair themselves as long as she has blood in her body. When the Dark Boots are in their dormant state, they form two blood-red anklets.^{[ch. 157]} With these powers, she saves Allen from the Level 4 Akuma whom they manage to exorcise thanks to Cross.^{[ch. 155,156,157]}

After the Black Order is rebuilt, Lenalee and her friends learn Allen is the vessel of the 14th Noah; eventually the Noah will control his body forcing the other exorcists to kill him if he becomes a Noah.^{[ch. 170]} Later, when Allen is imprisoned because of his transformations and escapes from the Order with the other two Noah, Lenalee tries to make him return. However, she fails as Allen confirms he still considers the Order his home before his departure.^{[ch. 203]} Three months later, Lenalee tries to conceal Yu Kanda's journey to find Allen from Komui.^{[ch. 210]} When Allen's mind is about to disappear from his body as a result of the Noah, Lenalee appears in an illusion allowing him to regain his desire to live.^{[ch. 222]}

=== In other media ===
As well as the main manga and anime series, Lenalee makes brief appearances in the three D.Gray-man spin-off light novels by Kaya Kizaki. She is also present in the series' video games, as well as the crossover fighting game Jump Ultimate Stars.

== Cultural impact ==
=== Popularity ===
Lenalee's character has been popular with fans. In an Anime! Anime! poll, Lenalee was voted the third female anime character fans wanted to see in yukata. In the 30th Annual Anime Grand Prix in 2007, she was voted the ninth best female character in anime. Newtype magazine ranked her the tenth best female character in anime for her role in D.Gray-man Hallow. In Newtype's 2015–2016 best-of-anime awards, Lenalee was seventh in the same category. In four D.Gray-man character popularity polls, she has consistently taken the fourth spot surpassed in each poll by Allen Walker, Yu Kanda and Lavi. She took the 20th place in the 2009 Anime Saimoe Tournament, an online popularity contest for the Most Moet Anime Character of the Year. Itō's performance was also the subject of praise by Eastern reviewers. In 2016, Lenalee was voted ninth cutest Chinese girl in anime and video games (out of twenty) with twenty-four votes by Japanese fans in a survey conducted by Goo Ranking, a fan poll site.

She has also been popular with cosplayers, earning a cult following in Japan. Many varieties of merchandise based on the character have been released such as outfits, key chains and action figures. For Halloween 2016 new merchandise was developed for a Tokyo cafe, and a vienna coffee drink was developed and named for Lenalee.

=== Critical reception ===
Manga and anime publications praised Lenalee's character and her role in the series. While noting how the initial story arcs followed Allen's mission with other characters including Lenalee, Joy Kim of Manga Life found the introduction of her character appealing as it provided comedic moments to balance the bittersweet ending of the series' previous story arc. Nevertheless, Kim complained about Viz Media's multiple misspellings of Lenalee's name in the manga's third volume. Kevin Leathers of the UK Anime Network referred to her as "the typical female influence" because of the contrast she provides with other characters from D.Gray-man like Yu Kanda. The Fandom Post's John Rose found her more sympathetic than Allen's previous ally, Kanda, which helped him enjoy the story more. He credited her character's introduction with helping the manga to develop. Leah Sacks of Comic Bulletin enjoyed Lenalee and Allen's relationship because of their similarities and because they do not argue unlike Allen's relationship with Kanda. Capsule Monsters' Michael Marr enjoyed Lenalee and the series' other supporting characters' roles because of their impact on Allen.

In describing the D.Gray-man's cast, Sandra Scholes referred to Lenalee as the "rational one" and commented on her varied personality. In one of the anime's original episodes not featured in the manga, Scholes found her favorite was the one where Lenalee is apparently on a date yet her companion turns out to be an Akuma who considers her to be attractive which results in a funny episode. Kimberly Morales of Animation Insider commented on Lenalee's tragic backstory noting she was forced to join the Black Order organization, but her reunion with her brother Komui became "paramount to her character". Morales also praised how Lenalee and Allen work together on a mission to help Miranda Lotto, who has a poor life, but thanks to the duo becomes a better person. Luci Christian's work as Lenalee's English voice actress was also complimented by Morales. Neo found Lenalee's design likeable, balancing other male characters' bishōnen looks. The staff also liked her fighting abilities despite finding the name of her weapon, "Dark Boots", unfitting.

Anne Lauenroth of the Anime News Network praised Lenalee's fight scenes in the anime's sequel D.Gray-man Hallow as she alone defeats multiple Akumas sent by the Noah Clan. Nevertheless, Lauenroth found Lenalee's inability to stop Allen from leaving the Order sad, but praised the direction of their farewell scene. Thanasis Karavasilis from Manga Tokyo agreed with the direction of Lenalee's actions in Hallow as she becomes one of Allen's last allies when he is being treated as a traitor by his comrades and how she jumps in at the climax of one episode to save him and prove Allen is a friend. Although Lenalee fails to rescue Allen in the end, Karavasilis felt their farewell implied a romantic interaction between them, but joked he did not want that due to his obsession with her. In addition he liked Lenalee's action scenes calling her "Bat-Lenalee". Karavasilis selected Lenalee as his favorite female character in the series as well as one of the best parts of Hallow. He also noted that although some fans were annoyed with Shizuka Itō being replaced by Ai Kakuma, he did not mind the change of voice actress for Lenalee.

Manga artist Osamu Akimoto told Hoshino Lenalee's appearance especially due to his taste of longhaired women as well male readers in general. Hoshino replied to him that it she often got the same comment about the change of Lenalee's design but Akimoto still liked how the reason for such change was well elaborated in one of her fights. Artur Lozano Mendez from Universidad Autonoma de Barcelona considers Lenalee as one of the most outstanding female characters in D.Gray-man due to her active role in the Holy War and how, despite being several male comrades, she never is shown having romantic interests with anybody. Meanwhile, Christine Détrez from Research Gate noted that Lenalee is often paired by fans of the series primarily with Allen in fanfiction in a similar fashion to Clamp fans. Comic Book Resources also said that Lenalee's character stands out within anime in general for showing common cheerful personality despite having been taken by the Black Order as a child in order to force through experiments to turn her into an Exorcist.
