= List of D.Gray-man episodes =

Key visual for the series

D.Gray-man is a Japanese anime television series based on Katsura Hoshino's manga series D.Gray-man. Produced by TMS Entertainment and directed by Osamu Nabeshima, the series follows the adventures of Allen Walker, an exorcist that wields the power of "Innocence" in order to fight against the Millennium Earl, an ancient sorcerer seeking to destroy the world with monsters called Akuma.

The episodes began airing on October 3, 2006, in Japan on TV Tokyo. The first season of the anime, known as the "1st stage", aired for 51 episodes, finishing its run on September 25, 2007. The second season, known as the "2nd stage", began airing on October 2, 2007, and finished its run on September 30, 2008, lasting 52 episodes. In 2008, Funimation acquired the series for an English-language release in North America and reformatted the series into four separate seasons. In June 2016, Funimation acquired the rights to the second half of the anime. A sequel titled D.Gray-man Hallow premiered in Japan in July 2016.

Twelve pieces of theme music are used for the series: four opening themes and eight closing themes. Singles have been released of the individual songs, and three original soundtracks, each containing tracks of the series' theme music, have been released on March 21, 2007, December 19, 2007, and December 17, 2008, respectively.

Twenty-six DVD compilations have been released by Aniplex between the first on February 7, 2007, and the latest on March 4, 2009. The first thirteen compilations contain episodes of the first season, and all successive compilations have episodes of the second season. On March 31, 2009, Funimation released the first thirteen episodes of the anime as a DVD compilation. The next thirteen episodes were released on June 23, 2009, and on Blu-ray released on January 5, 2010.

== Episodes ==
The seasons that correspond to the episode list correspond to the DVD sets released in North America by Funimation Entertainment. In Japan, D.Gray-man aired year-round continuously with regular preemptions in place, not split into standard seasonal cycles.

=== Season 1 (2006–07) ===
No.	English title / Original Japanese title	Original release date
1	"The Boy Who Hunts Akuma"; Transliteration: "Akuma o Karu Shōnen" (Japanese: アクマを狩る少年)	October 3, 2006
2	"The Black Order"; Transliteration: "Kuro no Kyōdan" (Japanese: 黒の教団)	October 10, 2006
3	"The Ghost of Martel"; Transliteration: "Matēru no Bōrei" (Japanese: マテールの亡霊)	October 17, 2006
4	"Old Man of the Soil and a Lonely Night's Aria" (Aria of the Land and the Night Sky); Transliteration: "Tsuchiokina to Kūya no Aria" (Japanese: 土翁と空夜のアリア)	October 24, 2006
5	"Let Me Hear the Lullaby" (Sing Me A Lullaby); Transliteration: "Komoriuta o Kikasete" (Japanese: 子守唄を聞かせて)	October 31, 2006
6	"That Which Calls Forth Disaster" (That Which Calls Out Disaster); Transliteration: "Wazawai o Yobu Mono" (Japanese: 災いを呼ぶもの)	November 7, 2006
7	"Tombstone of Memories" (Gravestone of Remembrance); Transliteration: "Kioku no Bohyō" (Japanese: 記憶の墓標)	November 14, 2006
8	"The Black Order Annihilation Incident" (The Black Order's Devastating Incident); Transliteration: "Kuro no Kyōdan Kaimetsu Jiken!?" (Japanese: 黒の教団壊滅事件!?)	November 21, 2006
9	"The Rewinding Town" (The Rewinding Town); Transliteration: "Makimodoshi no Machi" (Japanese: 巻き戻しの街)	November 28, 2006
10	"The Bad Luck Woman's Innocence" (Innocence of the Unhappy Woman); Transliteration: "Fukō na Onna no Inosensu" (Japanese: 不幸な女のイノセンス)	December 5, 2006
11	"Miranda Lotto's Feelings" (Miranda Lotto's Sentiments); Transliteration: "Miranda Rottō no Omoi" (Japanese: ミランダ•ロットーの思い)	December 12, 2006
12	"And Snow Falls Over the Town" (And in the Town the Snow Falls); Transliteration: "Soshite Machi ni Yuki ga Furi..." (Japanese: そして街に雪が降り...)	December 19, 2006
13	"With the Coat" (Along With a Coat); Transliteration: "Kōto to Tomo ni" (Japanese: 団服(コート)と共に)	December 26, 2006
14	"The Leaf of Revival" (Leaves Of Rebirth); Transliteration: "Fukkatsu no Ha" (Japanese: 復活の葉)	January 9, 2007
15	"Beyond the Snowstorm" (The End of the Snowstorm); Transliteration: "Fubuki no Hate" (Japanese: 吹雪の果て)	January 16, 2007
16	"Millennium Swordsman" (The Millennium Swordsman); Transliteration: "Sennen no Kenshi" (Japanese: 千年の剣士)	January 23, 2007
17	"Pride of the Swordsman" (The Pride of the Swordsman); Transliteration: "Kenshitachi no Hokori" (Japanese: 剣士達の誇り)	January 30, 2007
18	"Lenalee's Love" (Lenalee's Love); Transliteration: "Rinarī no Koi" (Japanese: リナリーの恋)	February 6, 2007
19	"Vampire of the Solitary Castle" (The Vampire in the Old Castle); Transliteration: "Kojō no Kyūketsuki" (Japanese: 古城の吸血鬼)	February 13, 2007
20	"Go for it, Exorcists!" (Do Your Best, Mr. Exorcist); Transliteration: "Ganbare Ekusoshisuto-sama" (Japanese: がんばれエクソシスト様)	February 20, 2007
21	"Krory Attacks" (Krory, Attacks); Transliteration: "Kurōrī, Shūgeki" (Japanese: クロウリー、襲撃)	February 27, 2007
22	"The Truth about Eliade" (Eliade's Truth); Transliteration: "Eriāde no Shinjitsu" (Japanese: エリアーデの真実)	March 6, 2007
23	"The Vampire Whom I Loved" (The Vampire I Loved); Transliteration: "Watashi ga Aishita Kyūketsuki" (Japanese: ワタシが愛した吸血鬼)	March 13, 2007
24	"Krory's New Beginning" (Krory's Journey); Transliteration: "Kurōrī Tabidachi" (Japanese: クロウリー旅立ち)	March 20, 2007
25	"The General's Chains" (The General's Chain); Transliteration: "Gensui no Kusari" (Japanese: 元帥の鎖)	March 27, 2007
26	"The Beginning of the End" (Beginning of the End); Transliteration: "Shūmatsu e no Makuake" (Japanese: 終末への幕開け)	April 3, 2007

=== Season 2 (2007) ===
No. overall	No. in season	English title / Original Japanese title	Original release date
27	1	"My Mentor, General Cross" (My Master, General Cross); Transliteration: "Waga Shi, Kurosu Gensui" (Japanese: わが師、クロス元帥)	April 10, 2007
28	2	"Exorcist Krory" (Krory the Exorcist); Transliteration: "Ekusoshisuto Kurōrī" (Japanese: エクソシスト•クロウリー)	April 17, 2007
29	3	"The One Who Sells Souls, Part 1" (The Soul Sellers, Part One); Transliteration: "Tamashii o Uru Mono – Zenpen" (Japanese: 魂を売る者•前編)	April 24, 2007
30	4	"The One Who Sells Souls, Part 2" (The Soul Sellers, Part Two); Transliteration: "Tamashii o Uru Mono – Kōhen" (Japanese: 魂を売る者•後編)	May 1, 2007
31	5	"Lost Miranda" (Miranda's Lost); Transliteration: "Maigo no Miranda" (Japanese: 迷子のミランダ)	May 8, 2007
32	6	"Mysterious Ghost Ship" (The Mysterious Ghost Ship); Transliteration: "Nazo no Yūreisen" (Japanese: なぞの幽霊船)	May 15, 2007
33	7	"The Village Where a Witch Lives, Part 1" (The Village Where the Witch Lives, Part One); Transliteration: "Majo no Sumu Mura – Zenpen" (Japanese: 魔女の棲む村•前編)	May 22, 2007
34	8	"The Village Where a Witch Lives, Part 2" (The Village Where the Witch Lives, Part Two); Transliteration: "Majo no Sumu Mura – Kōhen" (Japanese: 魔女の棲む村•後編)	May 29, 2007
35	9	"Exorcist Clad in Wind" (The Wind-Clad Exorcist); Transliteration: "Kaze o Matō Ekusoshisuto" (Japanese: 風をまとうエクソシスト)	June 5, 2007
36	10	"Shroud of Darkness" (The Dark Curtain); Transliteration: "Yami no Tobari" (Japanese: 闇の帳)	June 12, 2007
37	11	"Charity Bell" (The Neighborhood Boy ~Charity Bell~); Transliteration: "Rinjin no Kane ~Chariti Beru~" (Japanese: 隣人の鐘 〜チャリティベル〜)	June 19, 2007
38	12	"Froi Tiedoll"; Transliteration: "Furowa Tiedōru" (Japanese: フロワ•ティエドール)	June 26, 2007
39	13	"Silent Coffins" (Silent Casket); Transliteration: "Chinmoku no Hitsugi" (Japanese: 沈黙の棺)	July 3, 2007
40	14	"Requiem Rose" (The Roses of Eternal Repose); Transliteration: "Chinkon no Bara" (Japanese: 鎮魂の薔薇)	July 10, 2007
41	15	"A New Assassin"; Transliteration: "Arata Naru Shikyaku" (Japanese: 新たなる刺客)	July 17, 2007
42	16	"The Black Cat's Traps" (Trap of the Black Cat); Transliteration: "Kuroneko no Wana" (Japanese: 黒猫の罠)	July 24, 2007
43	17	"The Wandering Stone Statue" (The Wandering Statue); Transliteration: "Samayoeru Sekizō" (Japanese: さまよえる石像)	July 31, 2007
44	18	"Iron Fan Maid" (Maid Girl's Iron Fan); Transliteration: "Tessen no Jijo" (Japanese: 鉄扇の侍女)	August 7, 2007
45	19	"Strange Mansion" (Intriguing Mansion); Transliteration: "Kimyō na Yakata" (Japanese: 奇妙な館)	August 14, 2007
46	20	"Illusions in the Snow" (Illusion of Silver); Transliteration: "Shirogane no Gen'ei" (Japanese: 白銀の幻影)	August 21, 2007
47	21	"The Crystal Girl" (The Girl of the Crystal); Transliteration: "Suishō no Shōjo" (Japanese: 水晶の少女)	August 28, 2007
48	22	"Wavering Accommodator" (The Reluctant Host); Transliteration: "Yureru Tekigōsha" (Japanese: 揺れる適合者)	September 4, 2007
49	23	"Lulu Bell's Bell" (Madam Lulu Bell's Bell); Transliteration: "Ruru=Beru-sama" (Japanese: ルル=ベル様)	September 11, 2007
50	24	"Feelings of Devotion" (Earnest Feelings); Transliteration: "Ichizuna Omoi" (Japanese: 一途な想い)	September 18, 2007
51	25	"Set Sail, to the East" (Set Sail From The Far East); Transliteration: "Shukkō, Higashi e" (Japanese: 出航、東へ)	September 25, 2007

=== Season 3 (2007–08) ===
No. overall	No. in season	English title / Original Japanese title	Original release date
52	1	"Raid" (Invasion); Transliteration: "Raishū" (Japanese: 来襲)	October 2, 2007
53	2	"Fallen One" (Fallen); Transliteration: "Togaochi" (Japanese: 咎落ち)	October 9, 2007
54	3	"The Beginning of the Night of the End" (Beginning of the Night's End); Transliteration: "Owari no Yoru no Hajimari" (Japanese: 終わりの夜のはじまり)	October 16, 2007
55	4	"A Scream" (Howl); Transliteration: "Sakebi" (Japanese: 叫び)	October 23, 2007
56	5	"Delete"; Transliteration: "Derīto" (Japanese: デリート)	October 30, 2007
57	6	"Loss and Reunion"; Transliteration: "Shōshitsu to Saikai" (Japanese: 消失と再会)	November 6, 2007
58	7	"Asian Branch" (Asian HQ); Transliteration: "Ajia Shibu" (Japanese: アジア支部)	November 13, 2007
59	8	"The Road of the Pledged" (Road of an Vow); Transliteration: "Chikai no Michi" (Japanese: 誓いの道)	November 20, 2007
60	9	"Title"; Transliteration: "Taitoru" (Japanese: 題名 -タイトル-)	November 27, 2007
61	10	"Sinking Darkness" (Sinking Black); Transliteration: "Shizumu Kuro" (Japanese: 沈む黒)	December 4, 2007
62	11	"Maiden Who Has Fallen into Darkness" (The Saint Who Fell Into the Darkness); Transliteration: "Yami ni Ochita Seijo" (Japanese: 闇に堕ちた聖女)	December 11, 2007
63	12	"Ship Stalled, Girl Remains Absent" (The Ship of Evenness and the Girl Who Didn't Return); Transliteration: "Fune Modorogi Shōjo Modorazu" (Japanese: 船斑ぎ少女戻らず)	December 18, 2007
64	13	"Message"; Transliteration: "Messēji" (Japanese: メッセージ)	December 25, 2007
65	14	"Landing"; Transliteration: "Jōriku" (Japanese: 上陸)	January 8, 2008
66	15	"Confusion and Impatience" (Disturbance and Impatience); Transliteration: "Konwaku to Shōsō" (Japanese: 困惑と焦燥)	January 15, 2008
67	16	"Heading to Edo" (To Edo); Transliteration: "Edo e" (Japanese: 江戸へ)	January 22, 2008
68	17	"Silence"; Transliteration: "Chinmoku" (Japanese: 沈黙)	January 29, 2008
69	18	"Invasion"; Transliteration: "Shinnyū" (Japanese: 侵入)	February 5, 2008
70	19	"God's Clown"; Transliteration: "Kami no Dōke" (Japanese: 神ノ道化)	February 12, 2008
71	20	"The Name Chronicled" (The Signed Name); Transliteration: "Shirusareta Namae" (Japanese: 記された名前)	February 19, 2008
72	21	"Showdown in the Capital" (Decisive Battle in the Imperial City); Transliteration: "Teito Kessen" (Japanese: 帝都決戦)	February 26, 2008
73	22	"Kanda Joins the Battle" (Kanda Engages in Battle); Transliteration: "Kanda, Sansen" (Japanese: 神田、参戦)	March 4, 2008
74	23	"Edo Annihilated" (Edo's Annihilation); Transliteration: "Edo Shōmetsu" (Japanese: 江戸消滅)	March 11, 2008
75	24	"Clown and Auguste"; Transliteration: "Kuraun to Ōgyusuto" (Japanese: クラウンとオーギュスト)	March 18, 2008
76	25	"A Key and Noah's Doors" (Key and Noah's Door); Transliteration: "Kagi to Noa no Tobira" (Japanese: 鍵とノアの扉)	March 25, 2008
77	26	"The Skinn Bolic Room" (Skin Bolic's Room); Transliteration: "Sukin Borikku Rūmu" (Japanese: スキン･ボリック･ルーム)	April 1, 2008

=== Season 4 (2008) ===
No. overall	No. in season	English title / Original Japanese title	Original release date
78	1	"Forbidden Skill, Sangen Style" (Taboo, Three Illusions); Transliteration: "Kinki, Sangenshiki" (Japanese: 禁忌､三幻式)	April 8, 2008
79	2	"Noah's Memory"; Transliteration: "Noazu Memorī" (Japanese: ノアズ メモリー)	April 15, 2008
80	3	"The Twins' Trap" (Twins' Trap); Transliteration: "Tsuinzu Torappu" (Japanese: ツインズ･トラップ)	April 22, 2008
81	4	"Debt Crisis"; Transliteration: "Shakkin Kuraishisu" (Japanese: 借金クライシス)	April 29, 2008
82	5	"Bad Game"; Transliteration: "Baddo Gēmu" (Japanese: バッドゲーム)	May 6, 2008
83	6	"Jasdevi Enters the Scene" (Jasdevi, Enters); Transliteration: "Jasudebi, Tōjō" (Japanese: ジャスデビ、登場)	May 13, 2008
84	7	"Bloody Krory"; Transliteration: "Buraddi Kurōrī" (Japanese: ブラッディ•クロウリー)	May 20, 2008
85	8	"Dark-Colored Rhapsody"; Transliteration: "Yamiiro Rapusodī" (Japanese: 闇色ラプソディー)	May 27, 2008
86	9	"Weak Humans" (The Weak Person); Transliteration: "Yowaki Hito" (Japanese: ヨワキ ヒト)	June 3, 2008
87	10	"Transcendent One" (Critical Point); Transliteration: "Rinkaisha" (Japanese: 臨界者)	June 10, 2008
88	11	"Lavi"; Transliteration: "Rabi" (Japanese: ラビ)	June 17, 2008
89	12	"Voice of Darkness" (The Voice of Darkness); Transliteration: "Yami no Koe" (Japanese: 闇の声)	June 24, 2008
90	13	"Black Carnival"; Transliteration: "Burakku Kānibaru" (Japanese: ブラックカーニバル)	July 1, 2008
91	14	"Judgment"; Transliteration: "Jajjimento" (Japanese: ジャッジメント)	July 8, 2008
92	15	"Shadow of the Player" (Shadow of the Musician); Transliteration: "Sōsha no Kage" (Japanese: 奏者の影)	July 15, 2008
93	16	"Melody"; Transliteration: "Senritsu" (Japanese: 旋律)	July 22, 2008
94	17	"Homecoming"; Transliteration: "Kikyō" (Japanese: 帰郷)	July 29, 2008
95	18	"Lamb and Dog" (Sheep and Dog); Transliteration: "Hitsuji to Inu" (Japanese: 羊と犬)	August 5, 2008
96	19	"Still the Clock Ticks" (Yet the Hands of Time Move Onward); Transliteration: "Daga Susumu Koku no Hari" (Japanese: だが進む刻の針)	August 12, 2008
97	20	"Attack on Headquarters" (Headquarters Under Siege); Transliteration: "Honbu Shūgeki" (Japanese: 本部襲撃)	August 19, 2008
98	21	"The Power of Generals" (The Power of a General); Transliteration: "Gensui no Chikara" (Japanese: 元帥の力)	August 26, 2008
99	22	"The Noah of Lust"; Transliteration: "Shiki no Noa" (Japanese: 色のノア)	September 2, 2008
100	23	"Level 4"; Transliteration: "Reberu 4" (Japanese: レベル4)	September 9, 2008
101	24	"To the God I Hate So Much" (To the God I Hate); Transliteration: "Daikirai na Kami-sama e" (Japanese: だいきらいな かみさまへ)	September 16, 2008
102	25	"The Promise" (Exchange of Promises); Transliteration: "Yakusoku no Kotoba" (Japanese: 約束のコトバ)	September 23, 2008
103	26	"Echoes in the Long Morning" (It Echoes in the Long Morning); Transliteration: "Nagai Asa ni Hibiku" (Japanese: 長い朝に響く)	September 30, 2008

=== Hallow (2016) ===
No. overall	No. in season	Title	Original release date
104	1	"The 14th" Transliteration: "14 Banme" (Japanese: 14番目)	July 5, 2016
105	2	"Lonely Boy"; Transliteration: "Ronrī Bōi" (Japanese: ロンリーボーイ)	July 12, 2016
106	3	"I'll Be Okay After I Wash My Face"; Transliteration: "Kao o araeba Daijōbu" (Japanese: 顔を洗えば大丈夫)	July 19, 2016
107	4	"Blood Crusade"; Transliteration: "Seisen Buraddo" (Japanese: 聖戦ブラッド)	July 26, 2016
108	5	"Alma Karma"; Transliteration: "Aruma·Karuma" (Japanese: アルマ = カルマ)	August 2, 2016
109	6	"Friend"	August 9, 2016
110	7	"The Truth about a Sterile Flower"; Transliteration: "Adabana no Shinjitsu" (Japanese: 徒花の真実)	August 16, 2016
111	8	"Awakening"; Transliteration: "Kakusei" (Japanese: 覚醒)	August 23, 2016
112	9	"Little Goodbyes"; Transliteration: "Ritoru Gubbai" (Japanese: リトル・グッバイ)	August 30, 2016
113	10	"Sinner in Despair"; Transliteration: "Zetsubō no Zainin" (Japanese: 絶望の罪人)	September 6, 2016
114	11	"The Hidden One"; Transliteration: "Kakusa Reta Mono" (Japanese: 隠されたもの)	September 13, 2016
115	12	"My Home"	September 20, 2016
116	13	"Walker"; Transliteration: "Wōkā" (Japanese: ウォーカー)	September 27, 2016

== Home media release ==
The DVD compilations of the D.Gray-man anime are released by Aniplex. As of September 2008, only Region 2 DVD compilations have been released in Japan. Thirteen DVD compilations of the first season, all containing four episodes except the thirteenth DVD compilation (three episodes), have been released by Aniplex between February 7, 2007, and February 6, 2008. Thirteen DVD compilations of the second season, each containing four episodes, have been released, the last on March 4, 2009. Funimation released the first thirteen episodes of the anime as a DVD compilation on March 31, 2009, and the next thirteen episodes were released on June 23, 2009. Funimation's home media release listed four seasons instead of Aniplex's two "stage" seasons.

=== Region 1 ===
==== North America ====
Name	Date	Discs	Episodes
Season One, Part One	March 31, 2009	2	1–13
Season One, Part Two	June 23, 2009	2	14–26
Season Two, Part One	October 6, 2009	2	27–39
Season Two, Part Two	January 5, 2010	2	40–51
Season Three, Part One	October 10, 2017	3	52–64
Season Three, Part Two	December 12, 2017	3	65–77
Season Four, Part One	March 13, 2018	3	78–90
Season Four, Part Two	June 12, 2018	3	91–103
The Complete First Season	August 10, 2010	4	1–26
The Complete Second Season	March 15, 2011	4	27–51

=== Region 2 ===
==== Japan ====
===== 1st Stage =====
Name	Date	Discs	Episodes
Volume 1	February 7, 2007	1	1–4
Volume 2	March 7, 2007	1	5–8
Volume 3	April 4, 2007	1	9–12
Volume 4	May 2, 2007	1	13–16
Volume 5	June 6, 2007	1	17–20
Volume 6	July 4, 2007	1	21–24
Volume 7	August 1, 2007	1	25–28
Volume 8	September 5, 2007	1	29–32
Volume 9	October 3, 2007	1	33–36
Volume 10	November 7, 2007	1	37–40
Volume 11	December 5, 2007	1	41–44
Volume 12	January 1, 2008	1	45–48
Volume 13	February 6, 2008	1	49–51

===== 2nd Stage =====
Name	Date	Discs	Episodes
Volume 1	March 5, 2008	1	52–55
Volume 2	April 2, 2008	1	56–59
Volume 3	May 9, 2008	1	60–63
Volume 4	June 4, 2008	1	64–67
Volume 5	July 2, 2008	1	68–71
Volume 6	August 6, 2008	1	72–75
Volume 7	September 3, 2008	1	76–79
Volume 8	October 1, 2008	1	80–83
Volume 9	November 5, 2008	1	84–87
Volume 10	December 3, 2008	1	88–91
Volume 11	January 7, 2009	1	92–95
Volume 12	February 4, 2009	1	96–99
Volume 13	March 4, 2009	1	100–103

==== United Kingdom ====
Name	Date	Discs	Episodes
Season One, Part One	February 22, 2010	2	1–13
Season One, Part Two	April 12, 2010	2	14–26
Season Two, Part One	August 30, 2010	2	27–39
Season Two, Part Two	October 18, 2010	2	40–51
The Complete Season One & Two	December 6, 2010	8	1–51
